= Iqbal (name) =

- Gender: Male

Origin
- Language: Persian
- Meaning: "Prosperity", "luck" or "power"
- Region of origin: Muslim world, Punjab

Iqbal (Arabic: اقبال, Persian: اقبال, Punjabi: ਇਕਬਾਲ) is a male given name and surname of Arabic origin, introduced into South Asian naming traditions through Persian.

The name derives from the Arabic word iqbāl, meaning “prosperity,” “good fortune,” “success,” and “arrival toward a favourable destiny.”

In Punjabi usage, the name also carries the extended meanings of “power,” “force,” and “strength.”

The name is widely used across the Middle East, Central Asia, and South Asia, and is especially common among Punjabi Muslim families in both India and Pakistan. It is also borne by many Jatt Punjabi lineages, although it is not itself a clan name.

The surname gained particular cultural prominence in the Punjab region due to Allama Muhammad Iqbal (1877–1938), the philosopher‑poet regarded as a national figure in Pakistan, whose literary influence contributed to the widespread adoption of Iqbal as a family name.

== Family of Muhammad Iqbal ==
- Javid Iqbal (1924–2015), son
- Nasira Iqbal (born 1940), daughter-in-law
- Walid Iqbal, grandson

== Other people ==
=== Given name ===
- Iqbal Abdulla (born 1989), Indian cricketer
- Iqbal Ahmed (born 1956), British-Bangladeshi entrepreneur
- Iqbal Z. Ahmed (born 1946), Pakistani businessman
- Iqbal Ahmad Khan (1954–2020), Indian classical vocalist
- Iqbal Ahmed Saradgi (1944–2024), Indian politician
- Iqbal Ashhar (born 1965), Indian poet
- Iqbal Athas (1944–2026), Sri Lankan journalist
- Iqbal Azad, Indian actor
- Muhammad Iqbal Bahoo (1944–2012), Pakistani Sufi singer
- Iqbal Bahar Chowdhury (born 1940), Bangladeshi news presenter
- Iqbal Bano (1935–2009), Pakistani singer
- Iqbal Baraka (born 1942), Egyptian journalist
- Iqbal Bhatkal (born 1970), Indian terrorist
- Iqbal Butt (born 1956), Pakistani cricketer
- Iqbal Durrani (born 1956), Indian film director
- Iqbal Kazmi, Pakistani human rights activist
- Iqbal Hassan Mahmood, Bangladeshi politician
- Iqbal Hussain (born 1993), Singaporean footballer
- Iqbal Hussain Qureshi (1937–2012), Pakistani chemist and professor
- Iqbal Khan (director), British-Pakistani theatre director
- Iqbal Khan (general) (1924–2000), Pakistani general
- Iqbal Masih (1983–1995), Pakistani Christian child activist
- Eqbal Mehdi (1946–2008), Pakistani painter
- Iqbal Qasim (born 1953), Pakistani cricketer
- Iqbal Quadir (born 1958), Bengali entrepreneur
- Iqbal Siddiqui (born 1974), Indian cricketer
- Iqbal Singh (academic) (born 1972), Indian-American academic
- Iqbal Singh (politician, born 1923), Indian politician
- Iqbal Singh (politician, born 1945), Indian politician
- Iqbal Singh (spiritual leader) (1926–2022), Indian spiritual leader
- Iqbal Theba (born 1963), Pakistani-American television actor
- Iqbal Wahhab (born 1963), British-Bangladeshi restaurateur

=== Family name ===
- Amer Iqbal, Pakistani theoretical physicist
- Amjad Iqbal (born 1983), English footballer
- Ahsan Iqbal (born 1958), Pakistani politician
- Asif Iqbal (disambiguation), multiple people
- Dariush Eghbali (born 1951), Iranian singer
- Faisal Iqbal (disambiguation), multiple people
- Javed Iqbal (disambiguation), multiple people
- Imraz Iqbal, Fijian businessman
- Mohsin Iqbal (born 1983), Indian cricketer
- Moneeb Iqbal (born 1986), Scottish cricketer
- Muhammad Iqbal (disambiguation), multiple people
- Muhammed Zafar Iqbal (born 1952), Bangladeshi scientist, professor and author
- Muzaffar Iqbal (born 1954), Pakistani-Canadian chemist
- Nafees Iqbal (born 1985), Bangladeshi cricketer
- Nazia Iqbal (born 1984), Pashto singer
- Razia Iqbal (born 1962), British journalist and presenter
- Rao Sikandar Iqbal (1943–2010), former Defence Minister of Pakistan
- Shahid Iqbal (born 1953), Pakistani Navy admiral
- Tamim Iqbal (born 1989), Bangladeshi cricketer
- Waleed Iqbal, Pakistani lawyer
- Zafar Iqbal (disambiguation), multiple people
- Zain Iqbal (born 1998), British actor
- Zidane Iqbal (born 2003), Iraqi footballer

== See also ==
- Iqbal (disambiguation)
