= Iqbal Singh =

Iqbal Singh may refer to:

- Iqbal Singh (academic), academic in the fields of international relations, human rights and law
- Iqbal Singh (politician, born 1923), member of Indian parliament
- Iqbal Singh (politician, born 1945), lieutenant governor of Puducherry, India
- Iqbal Singh (spiritual leader) (born 1926), socio-spiritual leader of the Sikh community
