= Zafar (name) =

Zafar, Zaffar, Zufar is a given name and a surname of Arabic origin. Notable people with the name include:

Given name:

- Bahadur Shah II (1775–1862), last Mughal Emperor, also known by his nom de plume, Zafar
- Khoja Zufar (1500–1546), Arabiam merchant
- Zafar Ahmad Usmani (1892–1974), Sunni Jurist
- Zafar Ali Khan (1873–1956), Pakistani writer
- Zafar Ali Naqvi (born 1948), Indian politician
- Zafar Ansari (born 1991), retired English cricketer of Pakistani descent
- Zafar Babajanow (born 1987), Turkmenistani soccer player
- Zafar Bangash (born 1950), Pakistani writer
- Zufar ibn al-Harith al-Kilabi (694–695), Muslim commander
- Zafar Iqbal (disambiguation), various people
- Zafar Khashimov (born 1968) Uzbekistani businessman.
- Zafar Masood (actor) (1950–1981), Pakistani actor
- Zafar Masud (air commodore) (1927–2003), Pakistan Air Force officer
- Zafar Masud (banker) (born 1970), Pakistani banker
- Zafar Saifullah (1936–2014), Indian politician
- Zafar Usmanov (1937–2021), Soviet and Tajik mathematician
- Zafar Zaker (born 1990), Iranian para-athlete

Middle name:

- Syed Zafar Islam, Indian politician, national spokesman for the Bharatiya Janata Party and current member of the Rajya Sabha
- Muhammed Zafar Iqbal (born 1952), Bangladeshi writer and scientist

Surname:

- Abu Zafar (born 1963), Bangladeshi diplomat
- Ali Zafar (born 1980), Pakistani musician
- Ehsan Zaffar, American civil right advocate
- Faiza Zafar (born 1996), Pakistani squash player
- Madina Zafar (born 1998), Pakistani squash player
- Sahibzada Muhammad Ishaq Zaffar (1945–2006), Pakistani politician
- Shakila Zafar (born 1962), Bangladeshi singer
- Shirin Zafar (born 1946; commonly known as Shirin Guild), Iranian-born English fashion designer
- Sufi Zafar, US-based physicist and electrical engineer
- Syed Muhammad Zafar (1930–2023), Pakistani politician
- Wasi Zafar (1949–2021), Pakistani politician

== See also ==
- Zafarullah
- Jafar (disambiguation)
- Dhofar (disambiguation)
- Dzhokhar (name)
