= Javed Iqbal =

Javed, Javaid, Javid, Jawed, or Jawaid Iqbal may refer to:

== Film, television, and radio ==
- Javaid Iqbal (cable television installer), Pakistani immigrant to the United States, respondent in U.S. Supreme Court case, Ashcroft v. Iqbal
- Javed Iqbal (satellite television installer), Pakistani immigrant to the United States, convicted for providing access to Al-Manar channel to customers
- Javid Iqbal, a pseudonym used by British actor Shazad Latif

== Military ==
- Javed Iqbal (admiral) Pakistani admiral, politician, and diplomat
- Javed Iqbal (general) Pakistani lieutenant general
- Javed Iqbal Ramday Pakistani lieutenant general and President of the National Defence University (NDU), Islamabad

== Other uses ==
- Javid Iqbal (writer) (1924-2015), writer and former Chief Justice Lahore High Court
- Javed Iqbal (judge, born 1946), former Chief Justice High Court of Balochistan
- Javed Iqbal (serial killer) (1961-2001), Pakistani serial killer
- Jawaid Iqbal (born 1972), Pakistan-born Hong Kong cricketer

== See also ==
- Jawed (disambiguation)
- Iqbal (disambiguation)
