= Javed Khan =

Javed Khan may refer to:

- Javed Khan Nawab Bahadur (c. 1695–1754), Mughal official and effective regent from 1748 to 1754
- Javed Khan (actor) (born 1962), Indian film and television actor
- Javed Khan (composer), Indian film score composer, one-half of the Javed–Mohsin duo
- Javed Khan (cricketer) (born 1990), Indian cricketer who plays for Mumbai
- Javed Khan (charity executive), British chief executive of Barnardo's
- Javed Khan Amrohi, Indian film and television actor
- Javed Ahmed Khan (born 1956), politician in the All India Trinamool Congress (TMC) party
- Javed Ali Khan (born 1962), Member of the Parliament of India representing Uttar Pradesh
- Javed Ali Khan (politician), Indian National Congress politician
- Javed Ali Khan, a fictional character portrayed by Rumi Khan in the 2015 Indian film Baby

== See also ==
- Jawed (disambiguation)
- Khan (surname)
