= Kanza =

Kanza is a name. Notable people with it include:

== Given name ==
- Kanza Javed, Pakistani author and poet
- Kanza Omar, dancer born in Marrakesh

== Surname ==
- Daniel Kanza (1909–1990), Congolese politician
- Lokua Kanza (born 1958), Congolese singer-songwriter
- Sophie Kanza (1940–1999), Congolese politician and sociologist
- Thomas Kanza (1933–2004), Congolese diplomat

== See also ==
- Dirty Kanza
- Kanza Bowl
