= Jawid =

- Pronunciation: [ˈdʒaːʋɛːd]
- Gender: Masculine

Origin
- Meaning: Long Live or Eternal
- Region of origin: Iran

Other names
- Alternative spelling: Jawed, Javed

Jawid (Persian: جاويد, romanized: Jāwīd), also spelled Jawed, Jawayd, Javid, Javaid, Javed and other variants, is a masculine given name of Persian origin meaning "long life" or "eternal".

The name is from Modern Persian jāwid جاود "eternal". The word continues Middle Persian jāwīd, from an Old Persian *yāvaitat, ultimately from *yauu-, Iranian oblique stem of *āiuu- "age, duration", cognate with Greek αἰών "eon".

It is also chosen as a pseudonym by some, such as Huseyn Javid (Huseyn Abdulla oglu Rasizadeh) in the early 20th century. The given name became popular among Indian Muslims from about the 1940s, and remains a popular name for baby boys in Pakistan. Notable people with the name include:

== Given name ==
=== Jawaid ===
- Jawaid Iqbal (born 1972), Pakistani-born Hong Kong cricketer
- Jawaid Iqbal (professor), Indian academic and university vice-chancellor
- Jawaid Khaliq (born 1970), British professional boxer

=== Jawid ===
- Jawid Mojaddedi, Afghan researcher and professor
- Jawid Safi, Afghan cricketer

=== Jawed ===
- Jawed Sheikh (born 1954), Pakistani actor
- Jawed Karim (born 1979), German-American software engineer and entrepreneur, co-founder of YouTube
- Jawed Habib, Indian politician and hairstylist
- Mubashar Jawed Akbar (born 1951), Indian journalist and author
- Jawed Wassel (1959–2001), Afghan-American film director
- Jawed Ludin (born 1973), Afghan diplomat
- Jawed Ahmad (Jojo) (1986–2009), Afghan reporter working for Canadian CTV, arrested by American troops in 2007
- Jawed Siddiqi, Pakistani computer scientist

=== Javed ===
- Javed Iqbal (disambiguation), several people
- Javed Khan (cricketer) (born 1990), Indian cricketer who plays for Mumbai
- Javed Khan (charity executive), British chief executive of Barnardo's
- Javed Khan Amrohi, Indian film and television actor
- Javed Ali Khan (born 1962), Member of the Parliament of India representing Uttar Pradesh
- Javed Khan Nawab Bahadur (1695–1754) head eunuch and influential court official in the late Mughal Empire
- Javed Akhtar (cricketer) (1940–2016), Pakistani cricketer
- Javed Ashraf Qazi (born 1941), Pakistani general, politician, Senator in the Parliament of Pakistan
- Javed Akhtar (born 1945), poet, lyricist and scriptwriter from India
- Musa Javed Chohan (born 1948), former High Commissioner of Pakistan to Canada
- Javed Ahmad Ghamidi (born 1951), Pakistani Muslim theologian, Quran scholar and exegete
- Javed Sheikh (born 1954), Pakistani actor, director and producer
- Muhammad Javed Ikhlas (born 1955), Pakistani politician
- Javed Miandad (born 1957), Pakistani cricketer
- Javed Qureshi (born 1960), Pakistani cricketer and the first captain of the Pakistan U19 cricket team
- Javed Jaffrey (born 1963), Indian actor, dancer, comedian, impressionist
- Javed Kurd (born 1967), Pakistani-Norwegian music producer
- Javed Omar (born 1976), Bangladeshi cricketer
- Javed Qadeer (born 1976), Pakistani cricketer
- Javed Ahmadi (born 1992), Afghan cricketer
- Javed Ali (born 1982), Indian playback singer
- Agha Javed Pathan (1972–2018), political activist from Sindh, Pakistan, accused of shoe throwing on Arbab Ghulam Rahim
- Javed Ahmed Khan (born 1956), politician of the All India Trinamool Congress (TMC) party
- Javed Khan (politician) (born 1956), Indian politician, Minister for Disaster Management in the Government of West Bengal
- Javed Khan (actor) (born 1962), Indian film and television actor and former model
- Javed Nasir (1936–2024), three-star general of the Pakistan Army
- Javed Siddiqui (born 1942), Hindi and Urdu screenwriter, dialogue writer and playwright from India
- Javed Abidi (1965–2018), director of the National Centre for Promotion of Employment for Disabled People in India
- Javed Ashraf Bajwa, Pakistan Army engineer officer
- Javed Burki (born 1938), Pakistani cricketer
- Shahid Javed Burki (born 1938), Pakistani economist, Vice President of the World Bank, caretaker Finance Minister of Pakistan
- Muhammad Javed Buttar (born 1947), former justice of the Supreme Court of Pakistan
- Javed Hashmi (born 1948), Pakistani politician
- Javed Jabbar, Pakistani writer and politician, former information minister
- Javed Afridi (born 1983), Emirati business executive and entrepreneur

=== Javaid ===
- Javaid Laghari (born 1960), chairperson of the Higher Education of Pakistan
- Javaid Siddiqi, American educator and politician

=== Javid ===
- Javid Taghiyev (boxer) (born 1981), Azerbaijani boxer
- Javid Taghiyev (footballer) (born 1992), Azerbaijani footballer
- Javid Huseynov (born 1988), Azerbaijani footballer
- Javid Imamverdiyev (born 1990), Azerbaijani footballer (midfielder)

== Surname ==
=== Pakistan ===
There is no tradition of Pakistani surnames. Jawed is not one of the traditional family names, but it may be chosen as a "secondary" name, and it may have been picked as surname by expatriates in western countries.

- Hamid Javaid (1947–2019), former Pakistan Army general, Chief of Staff to President Pervez Musharraf 2001–2007
- Kanza Javed, Pakistani author and poet
- Tariq Javed (born 1949), Pakistani-born Canadian cricketer
- Nasir Javed (born 1966), Pakistani born American cricketer
- Mohammad Javed (born 1969), Pakistani cricketer
- Aaqib Javed (born 1972), Pakistani cricketer and coach
- Amjad Javed (born 1980), cricketer who has played one One Day International for the United Arab Emirates
- Sana Javed (cricketer) (born 1983), Pakistani cricketer
- Sana Javed (actress) (born 1993), Pakistani film and television actress

=== British Pakistani ===
- Sajid Javid (born 1969), Conservative Party MP
- Umran Javed (born 1979), British convicted terrorist supporter

=== Iran ===
- Behrouz Javid-Tehrani (born 1978), Iranian student arrested following the Iran student protests of July, 1999

=== Azerbaijan ===
- Huseyn Javid (1882–1941), Azerbaijani poet and playwright of the early 20th century

== See also ==
- 6262 Javid (1978 RZ), main-belt asteroid
- Dune Javid or Children of Dune, 1976 science fiction novel by Frank Herbert
- Hayat-i-Javed, the biography of Sir Syed Ahmed Khan by Altaf Hussain Hali, the great Urdu poet who was also his friend and associate
- Sholay-e-Jawid meaning Eternal Flame, Maoist political party founded c. 1964 in Afghanistan
- Javid Nama, or Book of Eternity, Persian book of poetry written by Allama Muhammad Iqbal and published in 1932
- Junaid Javed, Pashto musical band originating from Peshawar, Khyber Pakhtunkhwa in Pakistan
