= Sunder Singh =

Canadian Sikh activist

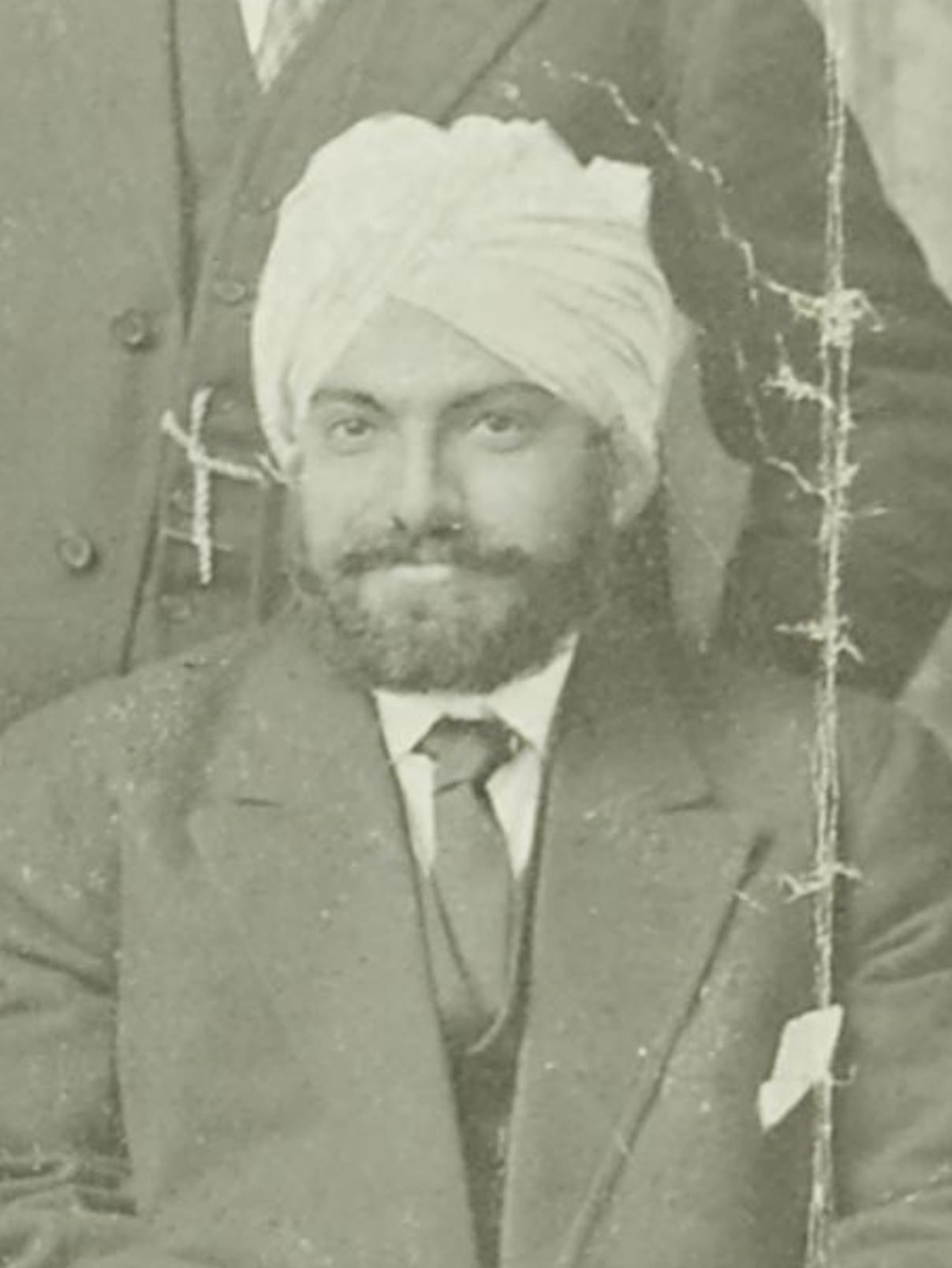
- Singh in 1911
- Born: c. 1882; Amritsar, Punjab
- Died: After 1930s
- Other name: Sundar Singh
- Education: Lahore Medical College (expelled); University of Glasgow (dropped out)
- Years active: 1911–1917

Sunder Singh (also spelled Sundar; c. 1882 – after 1930s) was a Canadian Sikh activist. He was born in Amritsar to an Arora family. A self-styled doctor, he studied medicine in the United Kingdom but did not finish his degree, instead going on to become a ship's surgeon. Upon moving to Canada, he became a moderate social activist who advocated on behalf of South Asians in Canada and for immigration reform, while still professing loyalty to the Crown.

== Biography ==
=== Early life ===
Sunder Singh was born sometime around 1882 into a family of the Arora caste in Amritsar, Punjab. He was the son of a subedar. Singh attended Aitchison College, then Lahore Medical College, but was expelled from the latter in 1904. He migrated to the United Kingdom in 1905, and continued his medical studies at the University of Glasgow, but ultimately did not complete his degree. In 1907, he began working as a ship's surgeon on a vessel regularly sailing between Brazil and New York City. While in New York, he frequented the India House established there.

=== Canada ===
He entered Canada through the Port of Halifax in February 1909, and settled in Vancouver, British Columbia. There, he joined the moderate faction of the activist community of South Asians. He briefly published the English-language newspaper The Aryan in Victoria from 1911 until it was shut down in 1912. The paper argued for better treatment for South Asians in Canada on the basis of them having a common Aryan ancestry with European Canadians. He went on to edit the newspapers Sansar and Hindustanee, which professed loyalty to the Crown. In November 1911, he travelled with Teja Singh to lobby the Canadian government in Ottawa for immigration reform. He then travelled to Toronto, where was noted for his public speeches to the city's business elite. He emphasized similarities between Western and Sikh culture, comparing Guru Nanak to Martin Luther and other Protestant Reformers. The newspapers in Toronto widely covered Singh's campaign. Singh returned to Vancouver in 1912.

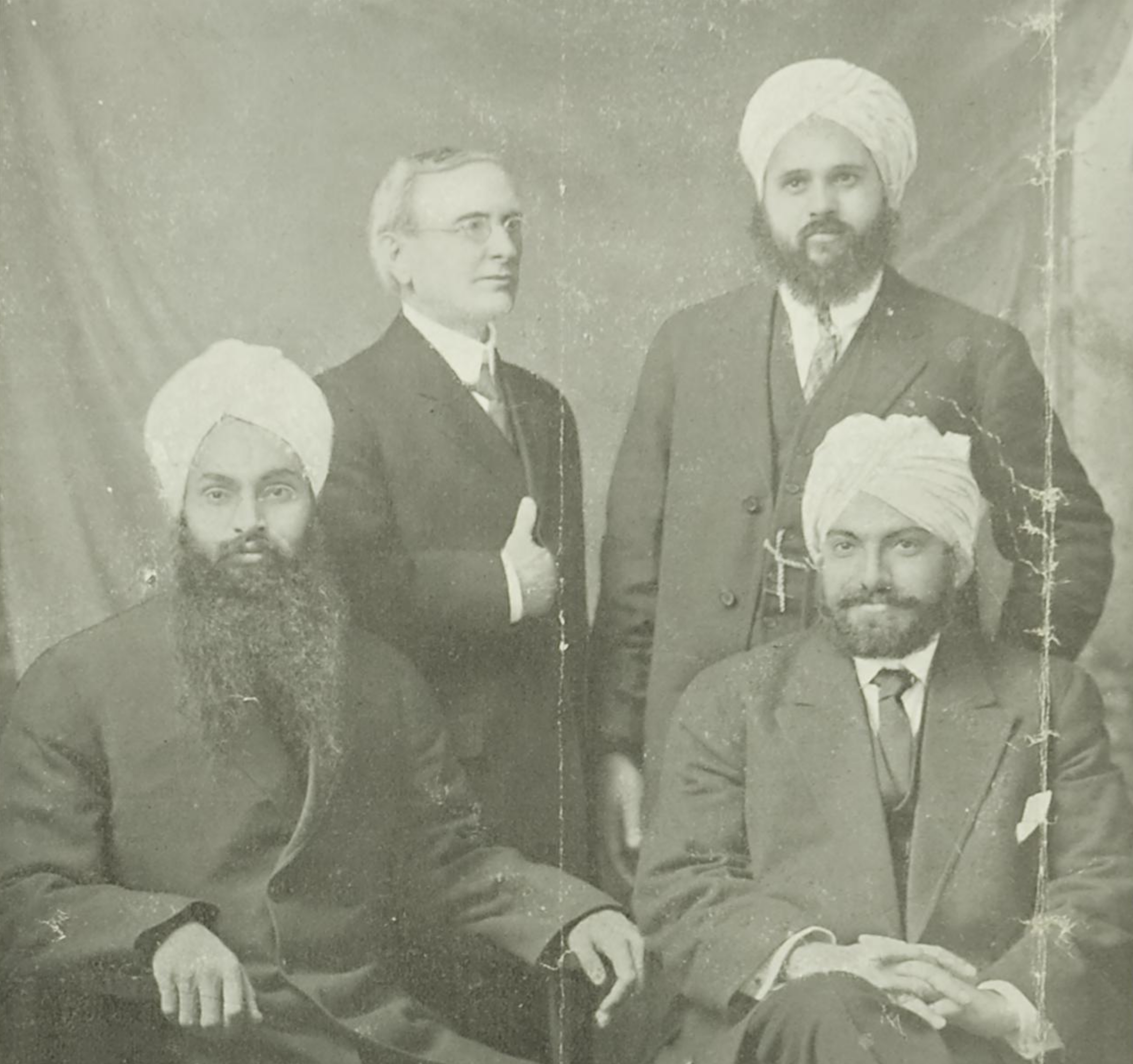
Sunder Singh (bottom right) in a group photo with Teja Singh (top right), 1911

Despite his appeals, the immigration system was not reformed, leading to growing extremism within the Sikh community and dissatisfaction with the strategy of persuasion, although Singh continued to maintain a moderate position. During the Komagata Maru incident of May 1914, he continued his strategy by unsuccessfully attempting to persuade the Immigration Department in Ottawa to permit entry of the South Asians aboard the ship. By 1916, pamphlets were published by the Toronto-based Canada India Committee under the pseudonym "Hindu-Canadian", whose arguments for South Asians in British Columbia were described as "suspiciously similar" to those of Singh. The pamphlets also argued for the superiority of Sikhs over other migrant communities. Between 1915 and 1916, Singh gave several speeches and lectures in Toronto, repeating his message of the South Asians' loyalty to the Crown. By 1917, he still remained in Canada despite the British crackdown on Sikh political activity in the wake of the Ghadar Conspiracy.

=== Later life ===
Singh later faded into obscurity, and there are no further references to him after the 1930s. His date of death is unknown.

== Selected writings ==
- Singh, Dr. Sunder (April 1912). "The Sikh in Canada". Canadian Home Journal. The Canadian Women's Magazine Publishing Co. p. 6.
- Singh, Sunder (1917). "The Hindu in Canada". The Journal of Race Development. 7 (3): 361–382. doi:10.2307/29738207. ISSN 1068-3380. JSTOR 29738207.
