= Zafarullah =

Zafarullah (Arabic: ظفر اللہ) is a male Muslim given name, meaning victory of God. It may refer to

- Kazi Zafarullah (born 1947), Bangladeshi politician
- Muhammad Zafarullah, Pakistani university vice-chancellor
- Muhammad Zafar Ullah Khan Dhandla,
- Muhammad Zafarullah Khan (1893–1985), Pakistani diplomat
- Nilufer Zafarullah (born 1949), Bangladeshi politician
- Zafrullah Chowdhury (1941–2023), Bangladeshi public health activist
- Zafarullah Khan (lawyer)
- Zafarullah Khan Jamali (1944–2020), Prime Minister of Pakistan

== See also ==
- Zafar
