= Karaikal Union Territory Struggle Group =

Karaikal Union Territory Struggle Group is a political organisation in Karaikal district seeking Union territory status for Karaikal. Karaikal Union Territory Struggle Group was established in the year 2005. It seeks Union territory status for Karaikal district after Puducherry Union territory gaining status of statehood.

A letter was sent by the struggle group to the Union Cabinet, Lok Sabha and the Rajya Sabha recommending Union territory status for Karaikal district. The struggle group has met the Lieutenant Governor of Puducherry U.T, Mr.Iqbal Singh for demanding Union territory status for Karaikal on 24 October 2009. The struggle group stated that Karaikal candidates were ignored and Puducherry candidates were seated in the vacant post of D-Group in the animal husbandry department. Many demands were given as memorandum to the governor.

Karaikal Union Territory Struggle Group has fasted a day on 17 Aug 2010 demanding Union territory status for Karaikal district. The fasting was headed by Munusamy, organiser of KUTSG(Nedungadu). It claimed the Pondicherry U.T Govt had ignored the development of Karaikal district for the past 60 years.
