= Aqeel Anjum =

Pakistani cricketer

Personal information
- Full name: Aqeel Ahmed Anjum
- Born: 7 March 1987 (age 39); Mirpur Khas, Sindh, Pakistan
- Batting: Left-handed
- Bowling: Right-arm medium
- Role: Batsman

Domestic team information
- Years: Team
- 2004/05–2013/14: Hyderabad Hawks
- 2005/06–2010/11: Hyderabad
- 2011/12: Sind
- 2011/12–2013/14: National Bank of Pakistan

Career statistics
Competition	First-class	List A	Twenty20
Matches	64	36	32
Runs scored	3,928	1,270	686
Batting average	38.89	40.96	25.40
100s/50s	8/17	1/8	0/2
Top score	204	106	75*
Balls bowled	282	36	–
Wickets	5	1	–
Bowling average	35.00	33.00	–
5 wickets in innings	0	0	–
10 wickets in match	0	0	–
Best bowling	3/25	1/20	–
Catches/stumpings	35/–	13/–	8/–
- Source: Cricinfo, 13 April 2026

Aqeel Ahmed Anjum (born 7 March 1987) is a Pakistani former cricketer. Anjum was a left-handed batsman who bowled right-arm medium and occasionally kept wicket. He was born in Mirpur Khas, Sindh.

Anjum made his List A debut for Hyderabad Hawks against Karachi Dolphins in the ABN-AMRO Cup in January 2005, scoring 40 in a six-wicket win. Later that year, he made his first-class debut for Hyderabad against Quetta in the Quaid-e-Azam Trophy. He later played first-class cricket for Hyderabad, Sind and National Bank of Pakistan, while in limited-overs cricket he also represented Sind Dolphins. He also played for Mirpur Khas, United Bank Limited, Regional XI, and Fauji Fertilizer Company Limited. Before establishing himself in senior domestic cricket, he scored 251 for Mirpurkhas against Badin in the Hyderabad-region inter-district senior cricket championship in 2005.

Anjum's best-known first-class innings came in November 2007, when he scored 204 for Hyderabad against Sialkot in the 2007–08 Quaid-e-Azam Trophy. In January 2012, he and Faisal Iqbal scored centuries for Sind against Khyber Pakhtunkhwa in the 2011–12 Pentangular Cup, with Anjum making 126. Earlier, in August 2011, he top-scored with 51 for National Bank of Pakistan against Pakistan International Airlines in the opening match of the Corporate T20 Night Cup.

Anjum played 64 first-class matches in which he scored 3,928 runs at a batting average of 38.89, making 17 half-centuries and 8 centuries.
