= Baru Sahib =

Town in Himachal Pradesh, India

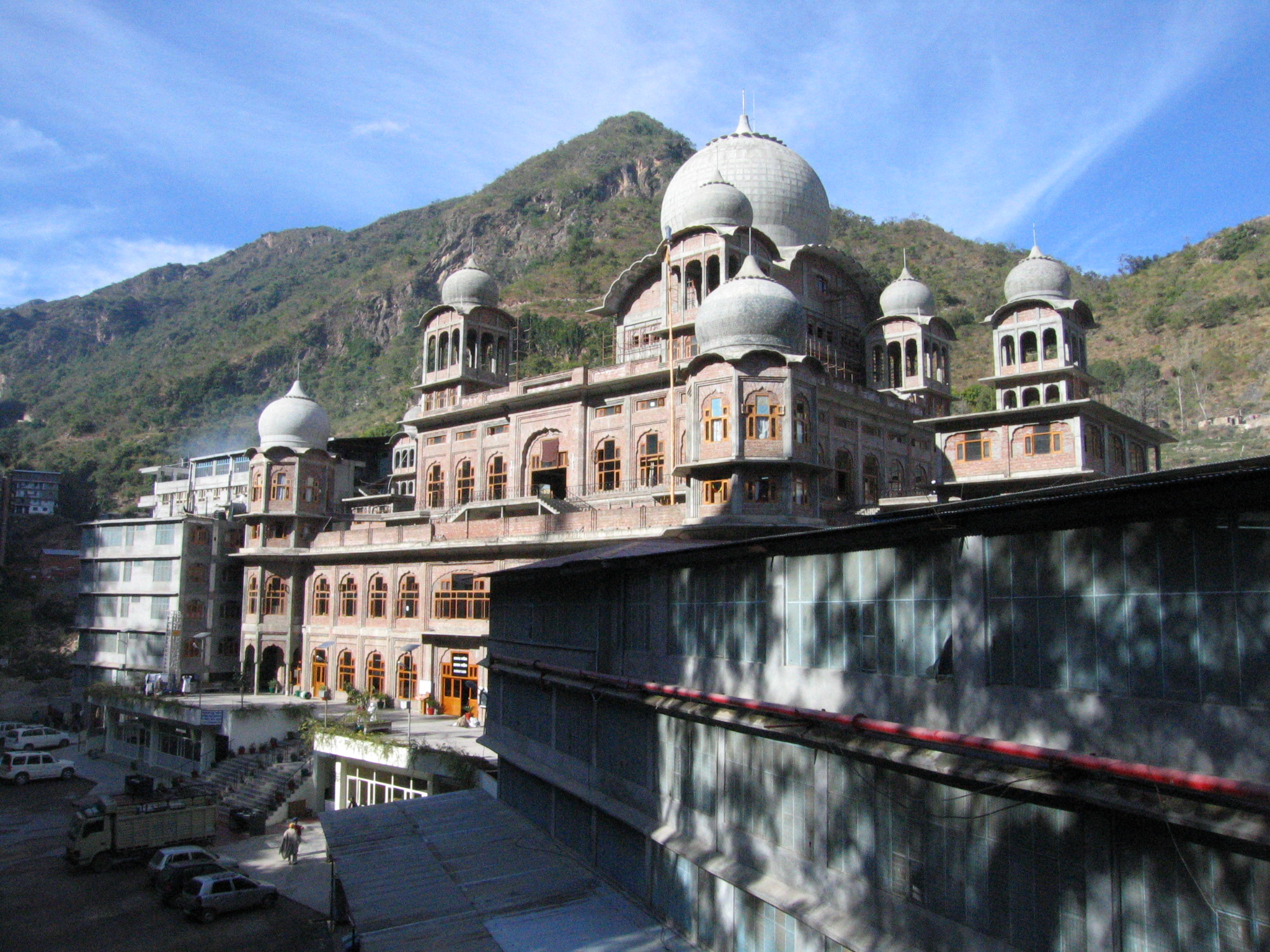
Baru Sahib

Baru Sahib also known as the "Valley of Divine Peace" is a town located in Sirmaur district in North Indian state of Himachal Pradesh, India.

== History ==
Baru Sahib, the land of meditation (tapobhoomi), is the realization of vision of Sant Attar Singh Ji, Mastuane Wale (1866–1927), who, in the early twentieth century envisaged a place in the Himalayas from where young souls equipped with the amalgam of spiritual and modern scientific education will spread the message of universal brotherhood throughout the world.

Baru Sahib was revealed to the mankind by his devout disciple Sant Teja Singh (1877–1965) {MA, LLB (Punjab, India), MA (Harvard, United States)} with the help of Bhai Iqbal Singh and Bhai Khem Singh in 1956.

In 1959, Sant Teja Singh Ji accompanied by 15-20 devotees performed Akhand Path Sahib in a mud-hut. At the conclusion of Akhand Path Sahib and Ardas, Sant Ji prophesied, "Just as a tiny banyan seed grows into a huge tree, in the same way this place will develop into a great center of spiritual education where high quality scientific education will also be imparted. In due course, roads will be built and all those whose hearts are brimful of love for Guru Nanak and who have toiled to accumulate spiritual capital from the previous births, will be drawn to this place".

This holy place, where several saints, sages and 'Rishis' were believed to have performed hard penance from time immemorial, had also been hallowed by the visit of Guru Gobind Singh, the tenth Sikh Guru.

=== Foundation ===
Sant Attar Singh (1866–1927), a revered Sikh saint and visionary of his time envisaged a centre of true education (a blend of scientific and moral education) in the lap of the Himalayas. His devout disciple Sant Teja Singh, MA, LLB (Punjab, India), AM (Harvard, United States) (1877–1965) took upon himself the task of fulfilling the vision of his mentor. To this end, he gathered a team of young students & inspired them to dedicate their lives to the service of humanity.

Bhai Iqbal Singh and Bhai Khem Singh were directed by Sant Ji to search, locate and reveal to mankind the hitherto hidden holy site (land) where several saints, sages and Rishis were believed to have performed hard penance from time immemorial. This place had also been hallowed by the visit of Guru Gobind Singh, the tenth Sikh Guru. Sant Ji told the duo that the sacred site was located in the lower Himalayas somewhere near the town of Nahan (in Himachal Pradesh).

Following the directive of Sant Teja Singh, the young team of Bhai Iqbal Singh & Bhai Khem Singh searched a vast territory trying to locate the sacred spot; but in vain. Bhai Iqbal Singh then beseech ed Sant Ji to allow him to resign his job in Punjab to take up employment in Himachal Pradesh. This step, he believed would facilitate the search for the sacred site. Sant Ji acceded to his request and blessed him "May the Guru abide with you."

=== Iqbal Singh in Himachal Pradesh ===
Responding to an advertisement in the newspaper, Iqbal Singh applied for & secured the job of Agricultural Officer in Himachal Pradesh. His search for the sacred spot continued in right earnest. He suggested to Sant Ji that land was suitable for setting up a spiritual centre near the Kalka-Shimla highway, easily accessible by car. Sant Ji turned down the suggestion saying that the envisaged site was further deep in the Himalayan jungles. Bhai Iqbal Singh searched tirelessly for the sacred spot but to no avail.

=== Discovery of the village Bharru ===
About 50–60 km from Solan, there was a village Baru spread over 400 Acres owned by one Thakur Joginder Singh. It was densely forested & had several springs. Under a huge walnut tree near a spring, sadhus would come & meditate from time to time. The Thakur would welcome them & offer them food.

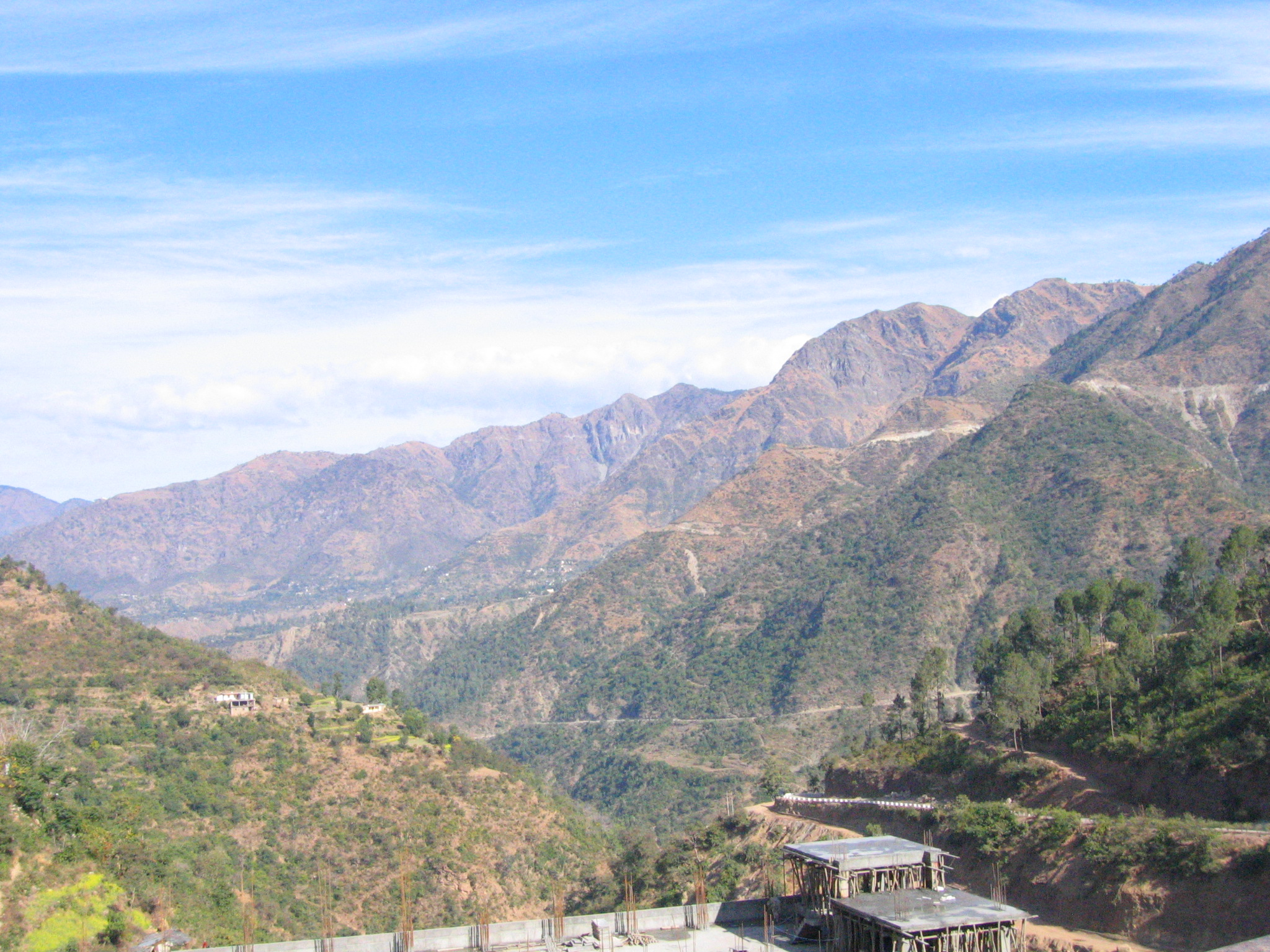
The Natural Ambiance Surrounding Baru Sahib

One day, a wise old ascetic came and sat under the walnut tree and was soon lost in deep meditation (samādhi). When he opened his eyes, the Thakur offered him food. But the sadhu looked at him and said, "Joginder Singh, you will not stay here for long. This is Guru Nanak's land. From the time of "Satya Yuga", saints and sages have performed penance here. Even Guru Gobind Singh Ji visited this place & blessed it. A time shall come when Guru Nanak's Sikhs gather here, meditate on the Divine Name, recite Gurbani; and spread the Divine Message throughout the world."

The Thakur, thinking that the holy man had put a curse on him; took away the food in anger. After a few hours, when his anger had abated, he returned with the food at the prompting of his wife but found that the sadhu had disappeared.

Meanwhile, in the heart of the God-enlightened Sant Teja Singh had flourished a keen desire to discover the sacred spot. Around the same time, it so happened that the Thakur fell out with the village folk and decided to sell off his estate. News of this turn of events got through to Sant Ji and he promptly sent a message to Bhai Iqbal Singh at Dhaula Kuan that a village Baru in Tehsil Sarahan of district. Nahan had been put up for sale. Bhai Iqbal Singh set off on foot for Baru 35 km away. On reaching the spot, he discovered that it had all the features prophesied earlier by Sant Ji.

Baba Iqbal Singh sent a letter to Sant Ji saying that the village Baru seemed to be exactly the place he had envisioned for setting up a spiritual center.

Sant Ji came down to Nahan from the village Cheema in Punjab and without visiting or negotiating the price, bought the entire 400 Acres of land at Baru in the year 1956.

=== Devotees throng the village Baru "The Land of Peace" ===
In 1959, 82 years old Sant Teja Singh Ji accompanied by 15-20 devotees trekked 35 km in the Himalayas to reach Baru Sahib. They set up camp and built a mud-hut, in which the first Akhand Path (Non-Stop reading of Guru Granth Sahib) was started. At the conclusion of Akhand Path, with tears in his eyes, Sant Ji performed the poignant Ardas, "True Master! When will you usher in the time when students from all over the world gather here and mould their lives in accordance with the teachings of Guru Nanak and bring peace to the world." After the Ardas, the devotees came over to Sant Ji and said "There is no habitation and no roads around here. This jungle has only wild animals like monkeys and bears. Who will trek through the jungles to this remote spot." Sant Ji replied, "Just as a tiny banyan seed grows into a huge tree, in the same way this place will develop into a great center of spiritual education where high quality scientific education will also be imparted. In due course, roads will be built and all those whose hearts are brimful of love for Guru Nanak and who have toiled to accumulate spiritual capital from the previous births, will be drawn to this place."

=== Sant Ji's prophecy comes true ===
Sant Teja Singh entrusted the responsibility of managing and developing the activities at Baru Sahib to Baba Iqbal Singh. The mud-hut housing the Gurdwara was expanded. In due course, roads were built; vehicles began to ply and by 1975, six rooms were constructed. Thereafter, in 1981-82, the construction of the cement and brick Gurdwara and Ashram building was started.

In 1986, the now famous Akal Academy had its beginning in the Ashram building with just five students. Over the years, the academy grew at an incredible pace to its present size. It is now an 11-storeyed building and has 1538 boys and girls on its rolls. Of these, 200 are overseas students; 100 from the US alone. 350 students are getting free education. A few of them belong to those families of the survivors of 1984 carnage, who have not yet been settled, children of martyrs of Punjab, children from underprivileged communities (Vanjara) in Maharashtra, Karnataka and Andhra Pradesh and Nanak Panthis from Uttar Pradesh.

Besides the Akal Academy, The Kalgidhar Society manages an orphanage, an old age home, a home for widows and destitute women, a 280-bed charitable hospital, a music centre, a spiritual academy for women wherein 200 young girls are getting free training besides board and lodging. As a foray into Higher Education, the Society has started Eternal University which today runs 24 programs including B.Tech. and B.Sc Nursing. The Teachers Training centres impart free training to around 2000 girls from the under-privileged classes. They are later absorbed as Teachers in the Akal Academies.

Apart from Akal Academy Baru Sahib, The Kalgidhar Society manages 129 English medium Schools under pattern of CBSE in various parts of rural Northern India. In these academies, some 60,000 students are receiving quality education besides being groomed in spiritual education Gurmat. Inspired by these children, grown ups are renouncing vices and approximately five lakhs have turned over new leaves.

== Education ==
Baru Sahib, houses a number of educational institutions ranging from pre-nursery to doctorate level. Some of them are named below:

- Akal Academy
- Eternal University
- Akal College of Engineering & Technology
- Akal College of Nursing
- Akal School of Divine Music & Spiritualism
- Akal School of Economics
- Akal School of Post-graduate Studies
- Akal School of Public Health
- Akal School of Business Administration
- Akal World School (in pipeline)

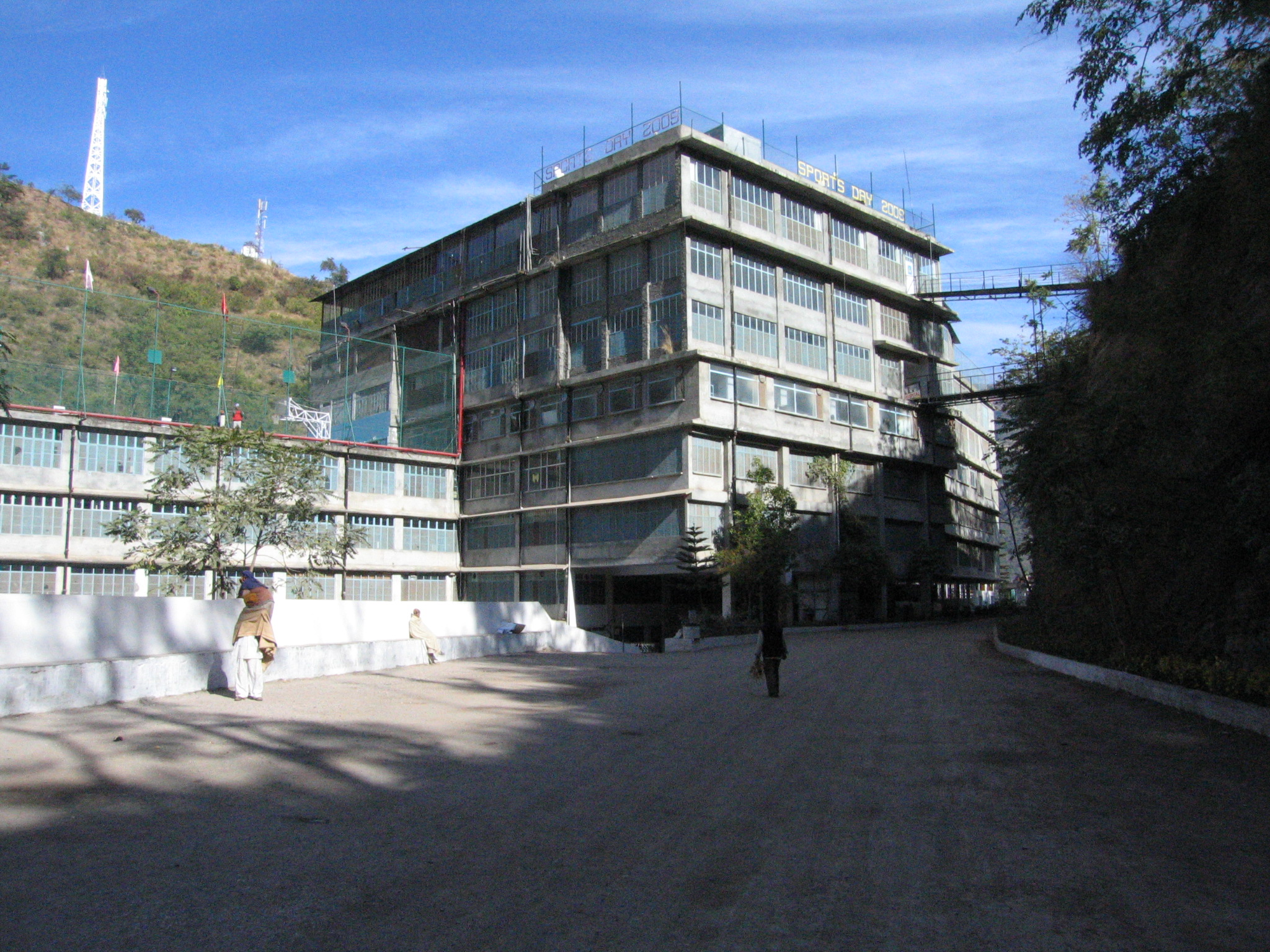
Akal Academy, Baru Sahib

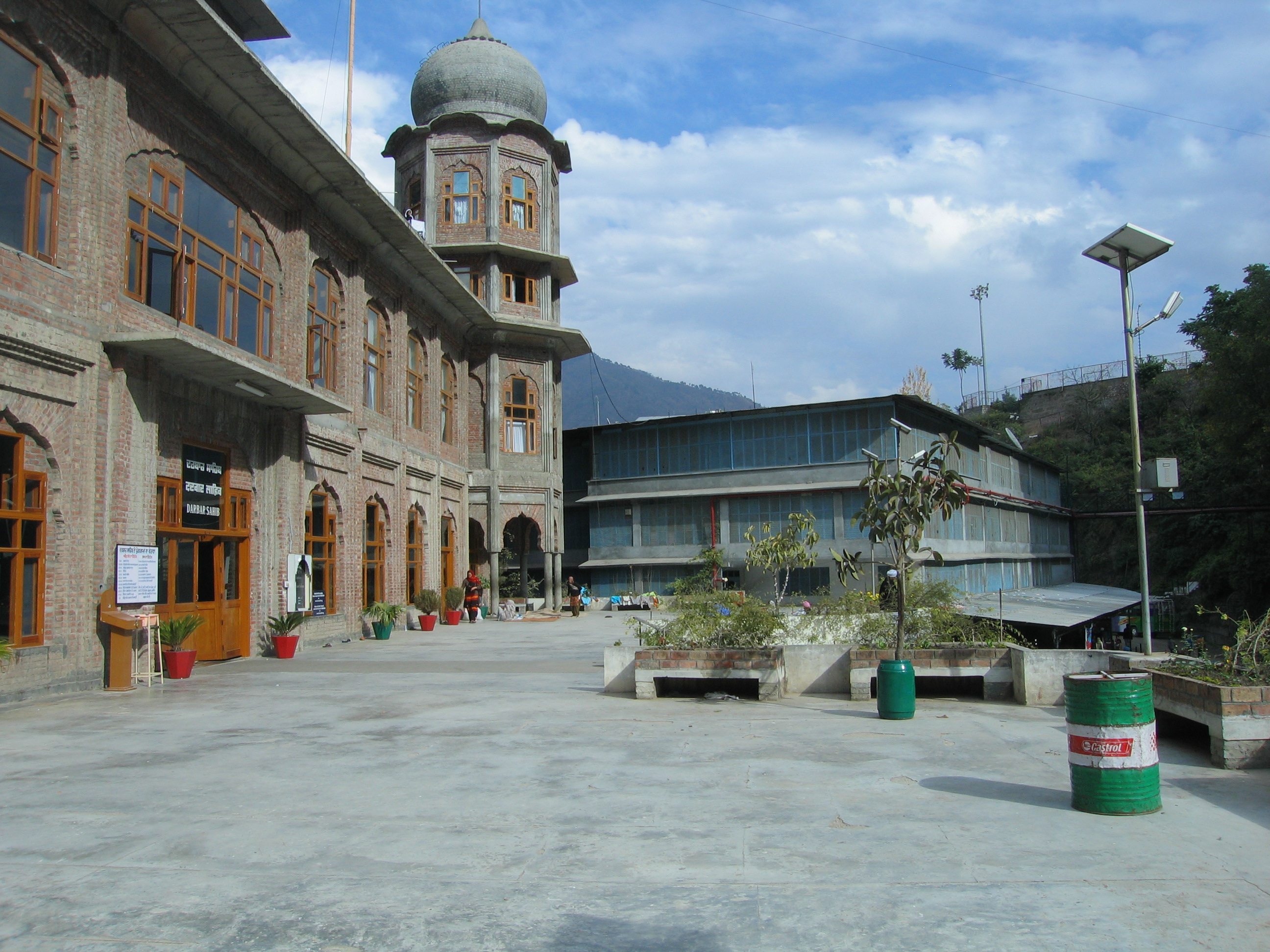
Darbar Sahib Entrance

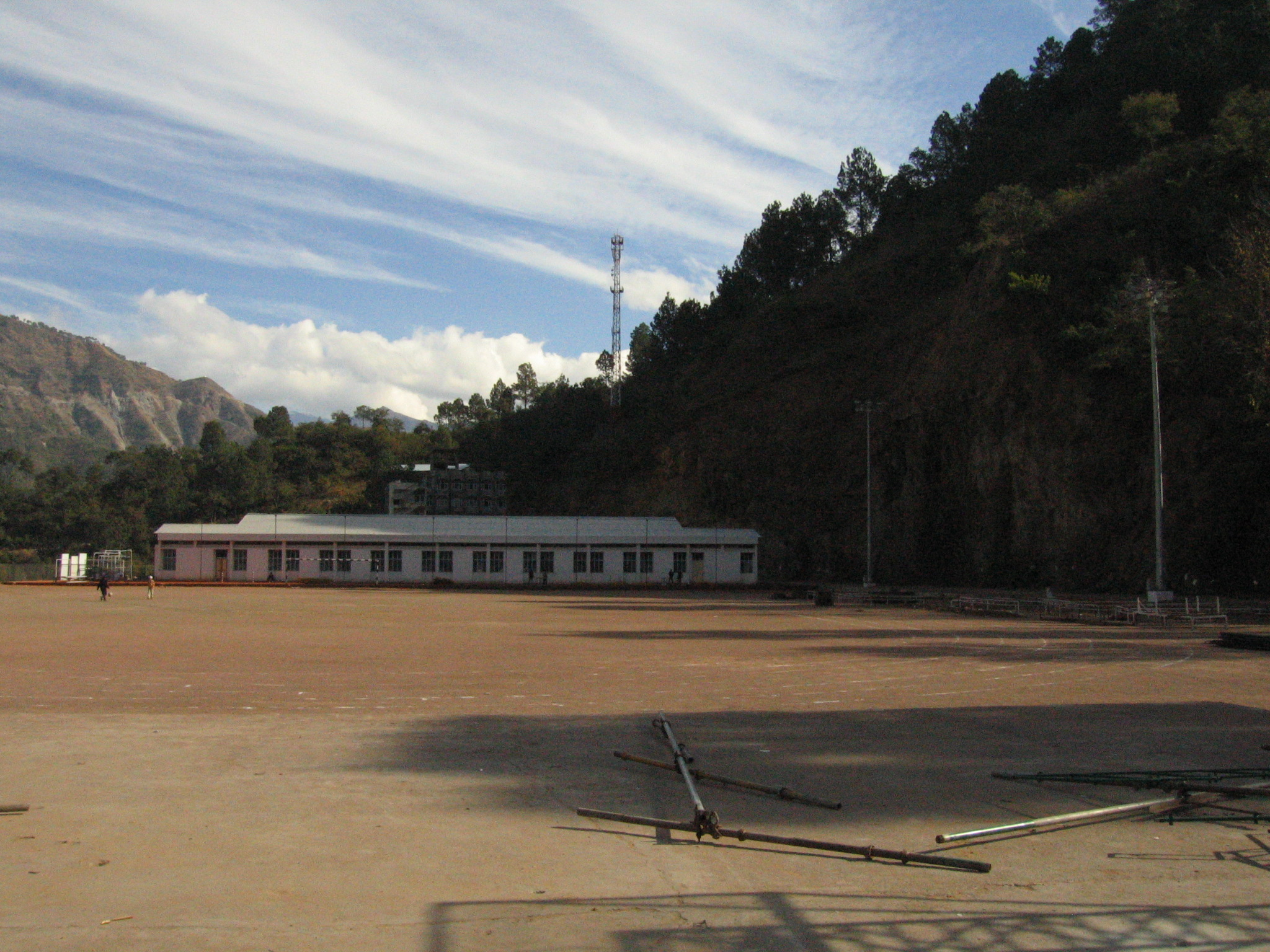
Baru Sahib Ground

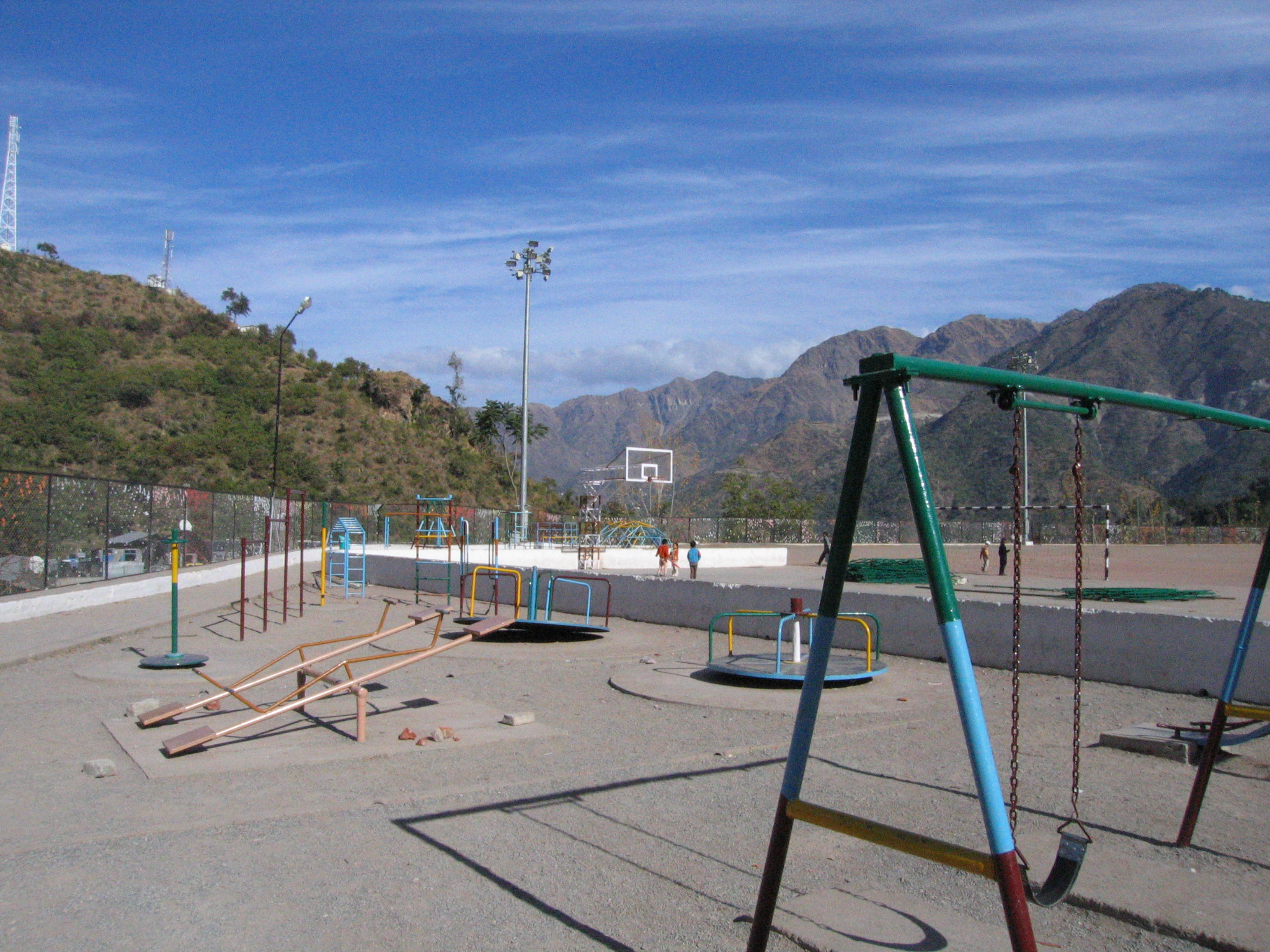
Children’s Play Area

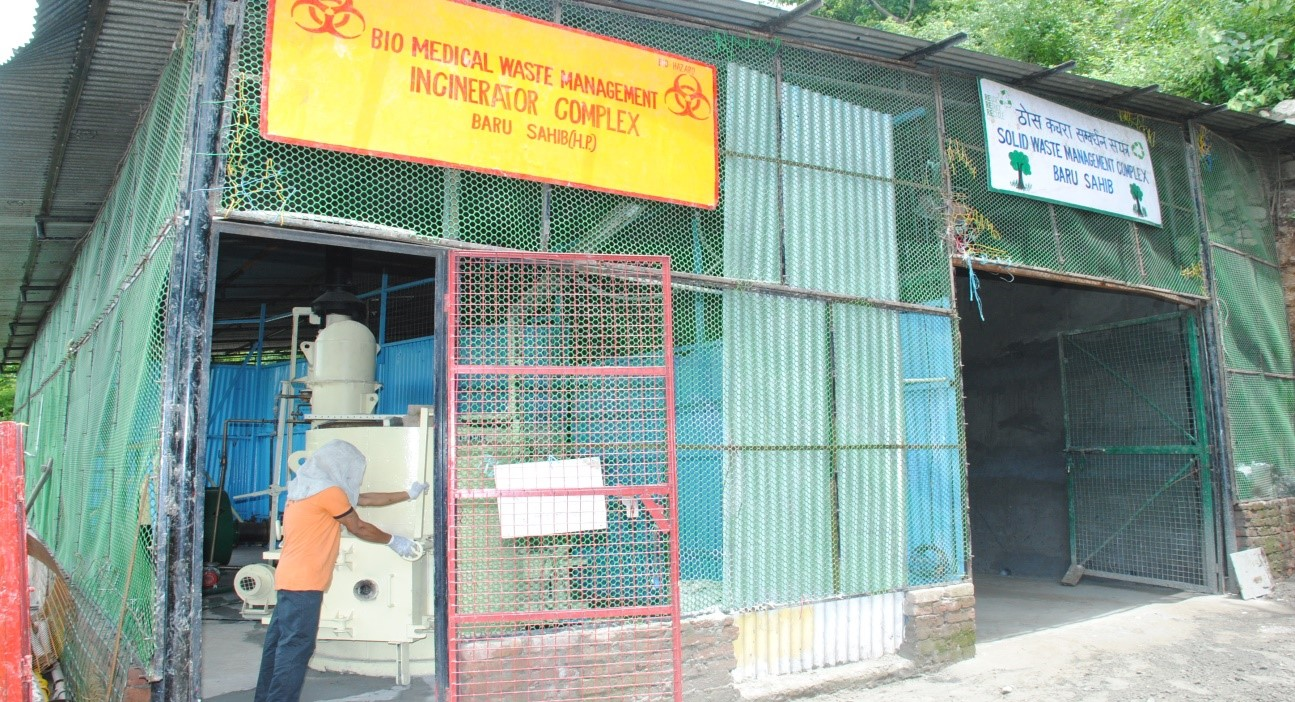
Baru Sahib Waste Management Plant
