= Haveli Barood Khana =

Historic building in Lahore, Pakistan

Haveli Barood Khana is an 18th-century haveli located in the Walled City of Lahore, Pakistan. It was built during the Sikh rule of Lahore. In recent times, the haveli has become a cultural symbol of Lahore.

== History ==
Haveli Barood Khana was built in the 18th century by a commanding general of the Sikh Army, who used it as his house. Part of the haveli acted as an ammunition depot and part was used as a residence. It was the norm at that time to keep ammunition at the commanding officer's house. The haveli was the largest depot outside the Lahore Fort and faced the fort directly. This lent it the name "Barood Khana" which means "ammunition depot". Currently, the haveli is owned by Yousuf Salahuddin,& family a socialite and philanthropist from Lahore who resides in it. Salahuddin inherited the haveli from his family after his forefather, Mian Karim Buksh, bought it in 1840’s. The Haveli Barood Khana was also at the center of the Pakistan independence movement and was the house of Mian Amiruddin, a prominent founder and leader of the All India Muslim League from this family who was the first Muslim Lord Mayor of Lahore.

== Architecture ==
The roof of the haveli is made up of wooden planks. Considering the hot temperature of Lahore, the haveli has high ceilings. Around 1901, the haveli was divided into a Zanan Khana (female quarter) and Mardan Khana (male quarter). A room was called Sheesh Mahal (glass palace) because the room had glass work done in it. During the Sikh era, a prayer room was built for the Sikh holy book, Granth Sahib. The room also has murals of its Sikh general fighting demons.

== Location ==
Haveli Barood Khana is located in the Walled City of Lahore facing the Lahore Fort, close to Taxali Gate. It is also close to the Shahi Mohallah Bazaar, Jamia Masjid Hanfia, the shrine of Pir Hazrat Baba Nauguzah and Badshahi Mosque. The British built a water tank near the haveli which supplied water to the city.

== Popular culture ==
The haveli is used for cultural activities and is an important landmark of Lahore's cultural heritage. It was a centre of the basant festival in Lahore and has hosted royalty, presidents, politicians, international dignitaries over the years. Many important events have been hosted here such as musical evenings, TV/movie shootings, and events for politicians, actors and musicians. Some scenes of the movie Khuda Kay Liye were shot here. The Pakistan Television Corporation used this as a location for its musical television series Virsa: Heritage Revived.
