= Yousuf Salahuddin =

Pakistani socialite and philanthropist (born 1951)

Mian Yousuf میاں یوسف
- Born: 1 November 1951 (age 74); Lahore, Pakistan
- Occupations: Television personality, philanthropist, socialite
- Relatives: Allama Iqbal (maternal grandfather); Javed Iqbal (uncle); Sardar Begum (grandmother); Waleed Iqbal (cousin)

Mian Yousuf Salahuddin (Urdu: میاں یوسف صلاح الدین), commonly known as Yousaf Salli, is a Pakistani socialite, philanthropist, and ex-politician from Lahore.

== Family ==
He is a maternal grandson of the poet and literary scholar Allama Iqbal and nephew of Javed Iqbal. His paternal grandfather, Mian Amiruddin, was the first Muslim Lord Mayor of Lahore. Salahuddin is a distant relative of the Taseer family, from which the ex-Governor of Punjab Salman Taseer came.

== Social life ==
Salahuddin is the owner and resident of Haveli Barood Khana, a traditional 18th century Mughal-style haveli located in Lahore's walled city. He has hosted parties, dinners, and get-togethers at his residence and elsewhere. High-profile personalities from throughout the country are invited as guests. He is a figure in the city's arts and culture circles who is credited for reviving Basant festivals and organising various musical, artistic, and poetic gatherings; the popular entertainment and music show Virsa: Heritage Revived broadcast on PTV is hosted by Salahuddin and has invited performances from a number of music artists. Pakistan Television Corporation producers and directors have used the above-mentioned Mughal-style haveli's large-sized enclosed outdoors ('haveli sehan' in Urdu language) to hold the music concerts for a live audience for their TV program Virsa: Heritage Revived.

According to a major Pakistani English-language newspaper, Yousuf Salahuddin has been playing a critical role in reviving and promoting the cultural heritage of Pakistan.
