= Muhammad Iqbal (disambiguation) =

Muhammad Iqbal (1877–1938), also known as Allama Iqbal or Iqbal, was a philosopher, poet and politician in British India.

Muhammad Iqbal may also refer to:

- Muhammad Iqbal (athlete) (1927–1996), Pakistani Olympic hammer thrower
- Muhammad Iqbal (footballer) (born 2000), Indonesian footballer
- Muhammad Iqbal (sport shooter) (born 1929), Pakistani Olympian
- Muhammed Zafar Iqbal (born 1952), Bangladeshi scientist and writer
- Mohammad Iqbal (Canadian cricketer) (born 1973), Pakistan-born Canadian cricketer
- Mohammad Iqbal (Emirati cricketer) (born 1975)
- Muhammad Saad Iqbal (born 1977), Pakistani citizen held in extrajudicial detention in the United States Guantanamo Bay detention camps
- K. T. M. Iqbal, Signaporean poet
- Md. Iqbal, Bangladeshi politician
- Muhammad Iqbal (civil servant)

== See also ==
- Iqbal (disambiguation)
- Bali Mauladad, Muhammad Iqbal Mauladad, Kenyan Indian big game hunter
- Iqbal Mohamed, British MP
