= Walid Iqbal =

Pakistani politician

Senator Walid Iqbal
- ولید اقبال

Chairman of the Senate Standing Committee on Human Rights
- In office 14 December 2018 – 10 April 2022

Member of the Senate of Pakistan from Punjab
- Incumbent
- Assumed office 14 December 2018
- Preceded by: Haroon Akhtar Khan

Personal details
- Other political affiliations: PTI (2011-present)
- Spouse: Nuria Rafique Iqbal
- Relations: Allama Muhammad Iqbal (grandfather); Yousuf Salahuddin (cousin)
- Children: 3
- Parent(s): Javid Iqbal (father); Nasira Iqbal (mother)
- Education: University of Pennsylvania (B.A); University of Punjab (L.L.B); Harvard University (M.A); University of Cambridge (M.A)
- Occupation: Lawyer; Law professor; politician
- Website: https://walidiqbal.pk/

Walid Iqbal is a Pakistani politician, lawyer, law professor, former member of the Senate of Pakistan from Punjab, Pakistan and a former chairperson of the Senate Committee on Human Rights. He frequently participates in international conferences, panel discussions, and television talk shows.

== Early life and education ==
=== Family background ===
Walid Iqbal is the grandson of Islamic philosopher and poet Muhammad Iqbal, and the son of Senior Justice Javid Iqbal and judge Nasira Iqbal.

His maternal grandfather Dr Abdul Waheed was a diplomat who represented British India at the League of Nations and was also the managing director of the Ferozsons publishing house while his maternal grandmother Saeeda Waheed was a Pakistan Movement activist and social worker.

=== Education ===
After completing high school at Aitchison College in Lahore, Iqbal went to the United States and received a bachelor's degree in economics from the Wharton School of the University of Pennsylvania in 1988.

He then studied at the University of Cambridge in 1989 and 1990, earning his Master of Philosophy degree in International Relations, his thesis being The World Bank’s Changing Relationship with Pakistan 1950–1990.

He also received a Bachelor of Laws degree from the University of Punjab in 1994 and a Master of Laws degree from Harvard Law School in 1997.

== Professional career ==
From 1990 to 1994, while studying law, Iqbal worked as a business executive in Pakistan's private sector.

== Legal career ==
Iqbal specialises in mergers and acquisitions, privatisation, corporate and project finance (particularly in the power sector), financial institutions, investment management, joint ventures, energy and petroleum, asset finance, information technology, telecommunications and software development, and corporate restructuring.

Between 1997 and 2004, he worked for two international law firms, Sullivan & Cromwell and Freshfields Bruckhaus Deringer. In January 2005, he returned to Pakistan and started his own law practice. He is an adjunct professor of business law at the Suleman Dawood School of Business, part of the Lahore University of Management Sciences (LUMS).

He is a member of the Securities and Exchange Commission of Pakistan and the Association of International Petroleum Negotiators (AIPN), and is on the board of directors of the Lahore Stock Exchange.

=== Bar memberships ===
- Advocate, Pakistan (1994)
- Advocate, High Courts of Pakistan (1996)
- State of New York (1998)
- Roll of Solicitors of England and Wales (2004; currently non-practicing)

== Political career ==
Iqbal joined Pakistan Tehreek-e-Insaf in November 2011. He was the party's candidate for the National Assembly from the NA-124 (Lahore-VII) district in the 2013 election, but was defeated by Sheikh Rohail Asghar of PML-N.

He took oath as a member of the Senate of Pakistan representing Punjab, Pakistan on 14 December 2018. He was the chairman of the Senate Committee on Defence from 2019 to 2021. He is the chairman of the Senate Standing Committee on Defence.

== Writings ==
His published work spans a range of subjects, including Pakistan’s nuclear tests and related sanctions, the country’s constitutional framework, alternative dispute resolution mechanisms, Islamic law and constitutionalism, Pakistan–Russia relations, and the philosophy of Iqbal.

Some of Walid Iqbal's publications include:

- Islam and Democracy in the 21st Century [Russian-American Seminar on Democracy and National Movements in the Modern World Russian Academy of Sciences, Ufa Branch Academy of Sciences of the Bashkortostan Republic October 20–23, 1999]
- Islamic Polity and the Constitutional Process in Pakistan [Article for the inaugural issue of the quarterly “Criterion”, Pakistan, Fall 2006]
- Life and Work of Iqbal: Why Muhammad Iqbal Has Contemporary Value [Presentation made at Conference on "Muhammad Iqbal Limits and Transcending Limits The Antagonism of Religion and Philosophy", Centre for Islamic Theology Westfȁlische Wilhelms University Münster, Germany Friday, 20 November 2015]
- Iqbal, Islamic Faith, and Islamic Civilization [Presentation made at The First International Symposium on Allama Muhammad Iqbal Zitouna University Tunis, Tunisia Tuesday, 26 February 2019]
