= Asif Iqbal =

Asif Iqbal may refer to:

- Asif Iqbal (lyricist), Bangladeshi lyricist
- Asif Iqbal (Pakistani cricketer) (born 1943)
- Asif Iqbal (Emirati cricketer) (born 1984)
- Asif Iqbal (Guantanamo detainee), former Guantanamo Bay detainee
- Asif Iqbal (Ayodhya bombing suspect), arrested on suspicion of involvement in a terrorist bombing
- Asif Iqbal (No Fly), received publicity because someone with the same name is on the U.S. government's No Fly List
