= Nasira Iqbal =

Pakistani jurist

- ناصرہ اقبال
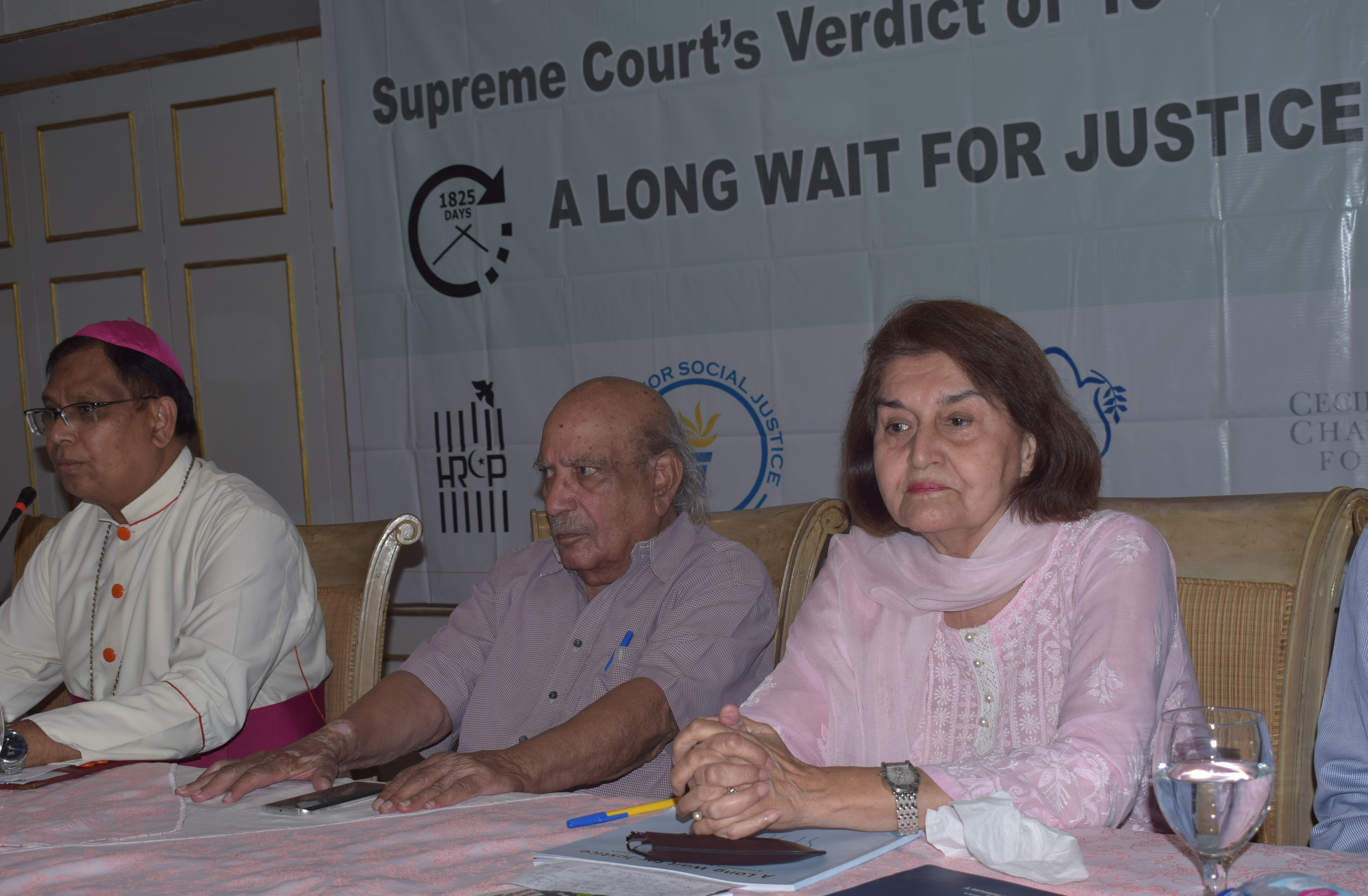
- Nasira Iqbal (right) with I.A. Rehman (center) and Joseph Arshad at a conference in Islamabad.

Justice of the Lahore High Court
- In office 7 August 1994 – 20 November 2002

Personal details
- Born: 21 November 1940 (age 85) British India) (later Pakistan)
- Spouse: Javed Iqbal (died 2015)
- Relations: Allama Iqbal (father-in-law)
- Children: Walid Iqbal; Munib Iqbal
- Education: Kinnaird College for Women (B.A); Punjab University (M.L); Harvard Law School (M.L)
- Awards: Sitara-i-Imtiaz, Government of Pakistan

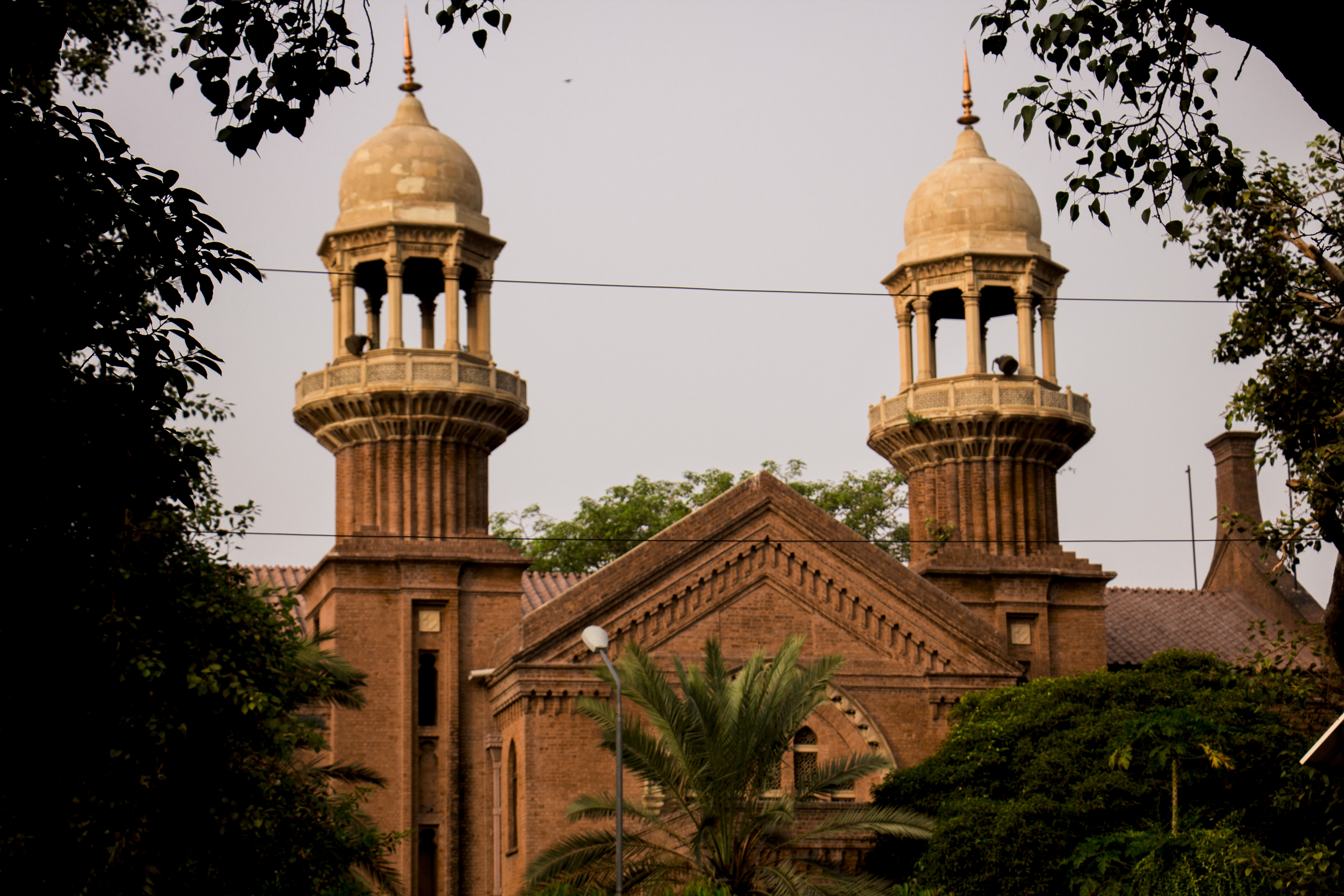
Lahore High Court

Justice Nasira Javed Iqbal (Urdu: ناصرہ جاوید اِقبال) is a Pakistani jurist and law professor who served as a justice of the Lahore High Court from 1994 to 2002. She is serving as the principal of Lahore School of Law.

== Personal life ==
Nasira Iqbal was married to Javid Iqbal– a former chief justice of the Lahore High Court, member of the Supreme Court of Pakistan, and son of the poet and philosopher Muhammad Iqbal –until his death on 3 October 2015.

== Education and career ==
Nasira Iqbal has a degree in intellectual property law from Punjab University, a Master of Laws degree (cum laude) from Harvard Law School, and a Master of Laws from Punjab University. As a legal scholar, she has lectured around the world and represented Pakistan at various international forums.

She was one of the first five women to be appointed to the Lahore High Court, where she served as a justice from 1994 to 2002. She is also the president of an activist group, the Concerned Citizens of Pakistan Society (CCP).

Iqbal has been a member of the Supreme Court Bar Association of Pakistan, the Law and Justice Commission of Pakistan, and the Pakistani delegation to the Human Rights Commission in Geneva. She is also a former president of the Lahore High Court Bar Association. Currently, she is a member of the executive committee of the Public Interest Law Association of Pakistan (PILAP); an honorary legal advisor to the International Women's Club, Lahore, and the All Pakistan Women's Association, Punjab; a trustee of Transparency International; and a member of the Pakistan Women Lawyers' Association.

== Awards ==
Among other honors, Nasira Iqbal was awarded the Sitara-i-Imtiaz by the Government of Pakistan, the Fatima Jinnah Medal for Women's Rights in 2006, the Woman of the Year Star Award in 2007, and the Wonder Woman Award in 2011.
