= Kanza Omar =

Moroccan dancer

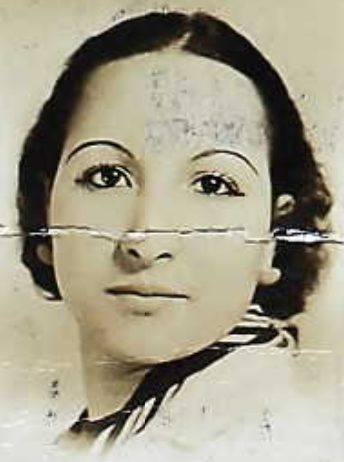
- Kanza Omar, from her 1935 paperwork towards American citizenship
- Born: Kanza Bent Larbi; February 26, 1912; Marrakesh, Morocco
- Died: March 6, 1958 (aged 46); Los Angeles, California, U.S.
- Occupation: Dancer

Kanza Omar (February 26, 1912 – March 6, 1958), sometimes billed as Princess Kanza Omar, was a Moroccan dancer who appeared in Hollywood films in the 1940s and 1950s.

== Early life and education ==
Omar was born in Marrakesh, according to her 1935 application for United States citizenship, filed in New York City under the name Kenza Bent Larbi. However, publicity sometimes described her as Egyptian, Persian, or Syrian. She moved to the United States with her first husband in 1927, and became a United States citizen in 1943.

== Career ==
Omar appeared in small roles in Hollywood films of the 1940s, including Aloma of the South Seas (1941), Cairo (1942), Mr. Co-ed (1944), Ali Baba and the Forty Thieves (1944), To Have and Have Not (1944), Adventure (1946), Easy to Wed (1946), Genius at Work (1946), Saigon (1948), The Bishop's Wife (1948), The Eagle and the Hawk (1950), Tropic Zone (1953), The Swan (1956) and The Buccaneer (1958).

Omar danced at events and parties. In 1942, Omar danced at a Los Angeles fundraiser for the USO, sponsored by the Syrian American Society. In 1950, she performed at an international festival at UCLA. In 1951, she danced at a New York City benefit for Palestinian refugees. She toured as a dancer in the United States in the early 1950s, and was featured artist at the Attiyeh Benevolent Society's annual national meeting in 1952. In 1953 she danced at a Hafli event in Los Angeles, accompanied by violinist Sami Shawa. 1955 she performed at the Western Pacific Annual Mahrajan, sharing the bill with Danny Thomas, musician Elia Baida, and Toufic Barham's orchestra.

== Personal life ==
Omar's first husband, Omar Ben Mohammed, died from carbon monoxide poisoning in 1928. She married Jack Haddad in 1943; they divorced in 1949. She died from cancer in 1958, at the age of 46, in Los Angeles, California.
