= Eternal University =

University in Himachal Pradesh, India

- Other name: EU
- Motto: World Peace through Value based Education
- Type: Private
- Established: 2008
- Chancellor: Dr. Davinder Singh
- Vice-Chancellor: Dr. Neelam Kaur
- Faculty: 170
- Administrative staff: 25
- Students: 2500
- Location: Baru Sahib, Himachal Pradesh, India; 30.756°N 77.299°E
- Campus: Rural
- Website: www.eternaluniversity.edu.in

Eternal University is a private university in Himachal Pradesh established by an Act of the state legislature of Himachal. It is located in the 450-acre (1.8 km^{2}) educational campus popularly known as Baru Sahib- The Valley of Divine Peace.

The university offers UGC (University Grants Commission) certified undergraduate, postgraduate and PhD courses ranging from biotechnology, microbiology, agriculture, engineering and medical to management and public health only for girls.

== Establishment ==
The university is a full-fledged UGC Recognised University and not a Deemed University, established under the 'Himachal Pradesh Private Universities (Establishment and Regulation) Act 2006 passed by the State Legislature of Himachal Pradesh' and Himachal Pradesh Government Notification No EDN-A-GHA (8)6/2006(Loose) dated 29 April 2008). under section 2 (f) and 12B of The UGC Act 1956.

== Location ==
Eternal University is 110 km (68 mi) from Shimla (capital of Himachal Pradesh) in the Himalayas at Baru Sahib- The valley of divine peace. Eternal University exists in a 450-acre (1.8 km^{2}) campus containing a university, a number of professional colleges, an International Akal Academy, an IB world School, a multi-specialty charitable hospital, a Gurudwara, a post office, a bank, and a fuel station.

== Colleges ==
Eternal University has the following colleges and departments affiliated to its name:

I. Akal College of Engineering & Technology

1. Electronics & Communication Engineering
2. Electrical & Electronics Engineering
3. Computer Science & Engineering

II. Dr. Khem Singh Gill Akal College of Agriculture

1. Department of Biotechnology
2. Department of Agriculture
3. Department of Food Technology
4. Department of Entomology

III. Akal College of Economics, Commerce & Management

1. Department of Economics
2. Department of Commerce
3. Department of Management

IV. Akal College of Arts & Social Sciences

1. Department of Divine Music and Spiritualism
2. Department of English
3. Department of Psychology

V. Akal College of Health and Allied Sciences

1. Akal College of Nursing
2. Akal College of Public Health & Hospital Administration

VI. Akal College of Education

VII. Akal College of Basic Sciences

1. Department of Biochemistry
2. Department of Chemistry
3. Department of Microbiology
4. Department of Mathematics
5. Department of Physics
6. Department of Botany
7. Department of Environmental Science

== Clubs and societies ==
- The Eternal English Literary Society organises literary activities. It helps the students to improve their communication skills, and encourages them to speak in English.
- The Eternal Technocrats Club organises in technical and management events.
- The Cultural Club organises cultural events like singing, skits and plays.
- The EU Sports Club organises sports events like cricket, football, basketball, chess, TT, badminton, and weight lifting.
- Akal Renewable Energy Club works in collaboration with the Ministry of NRE and Research, government of India. The club promotes the use of renewable energy.

== Gallery ==
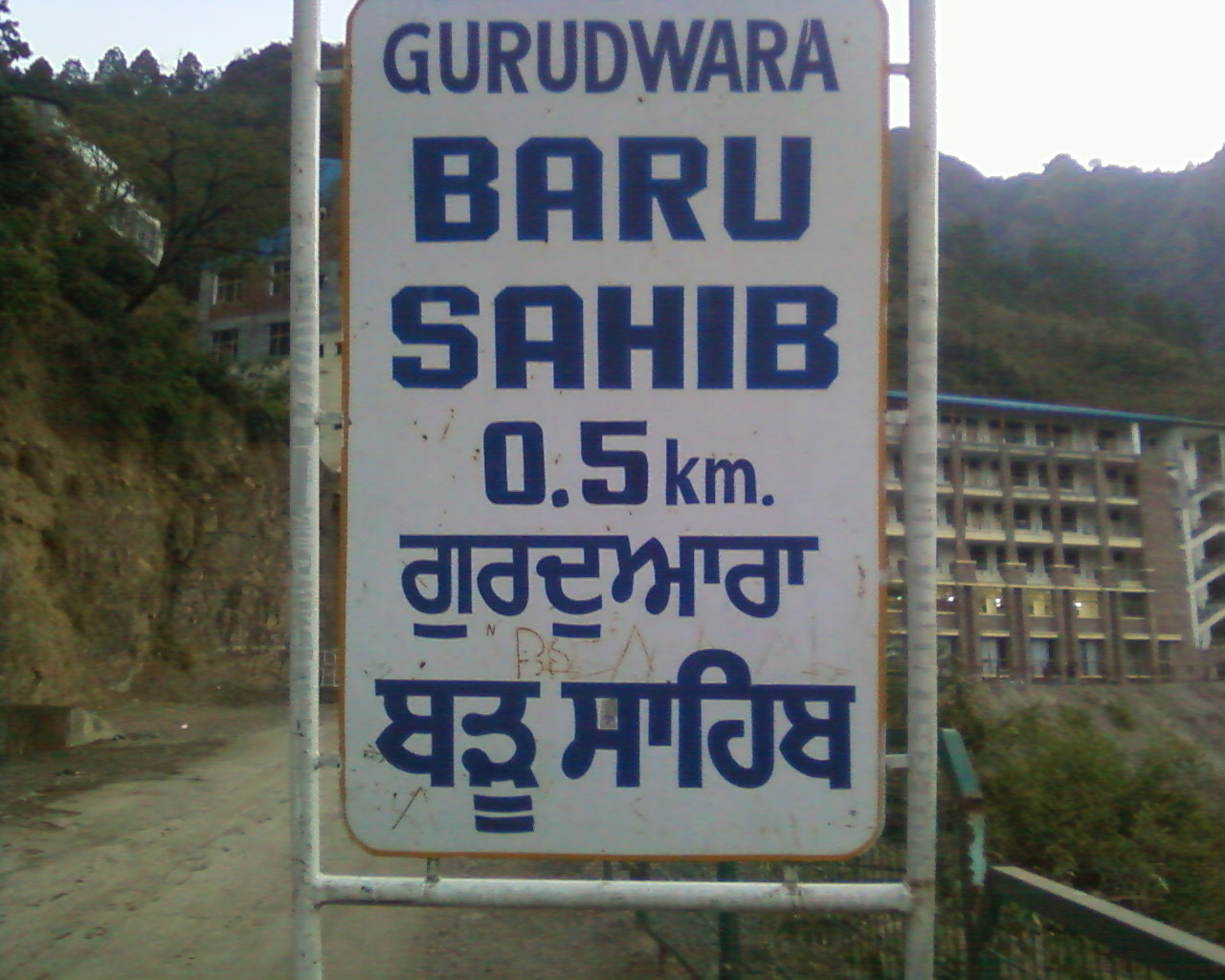
Entrance to Baru Sahib Campus

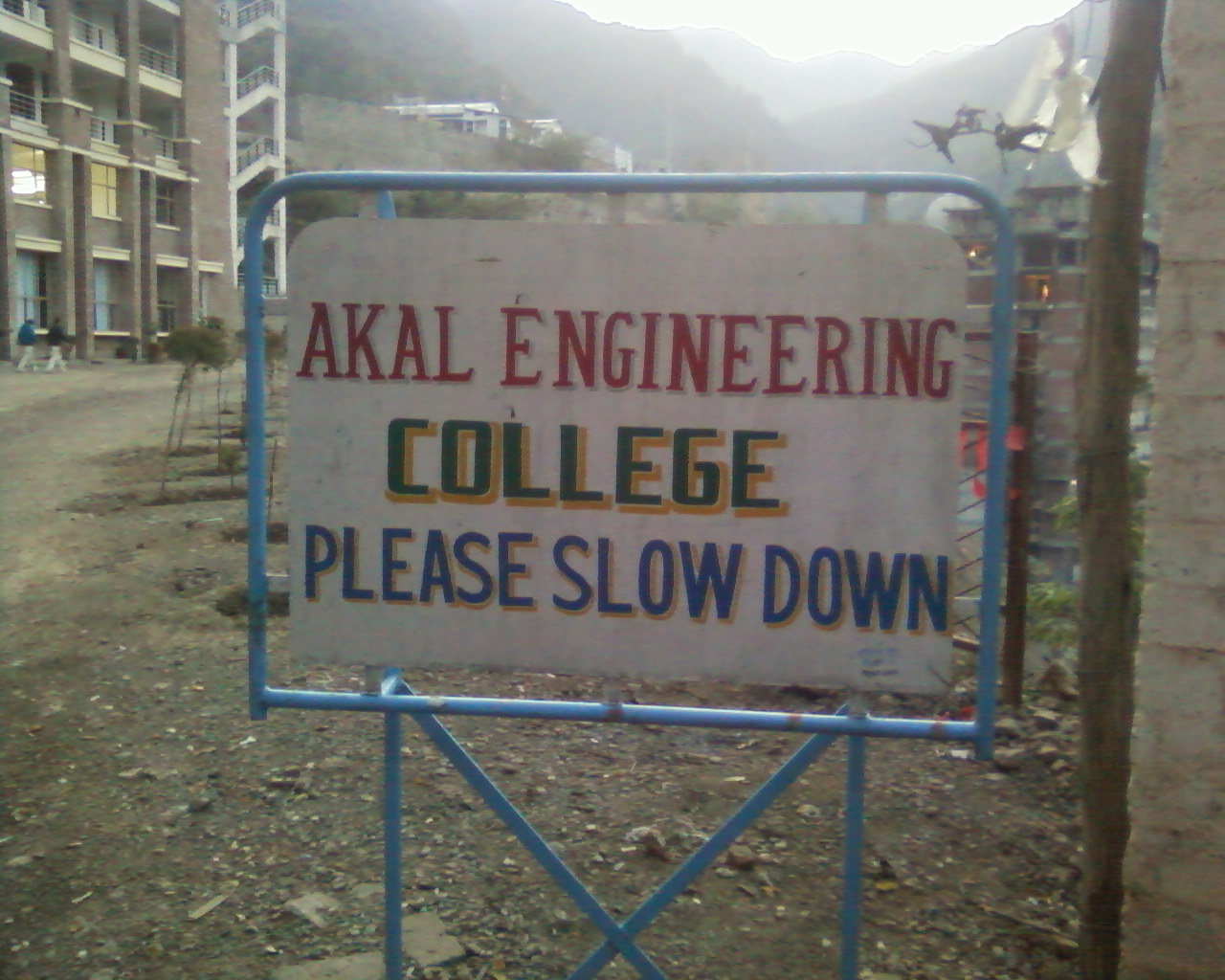
ACET Sign Board

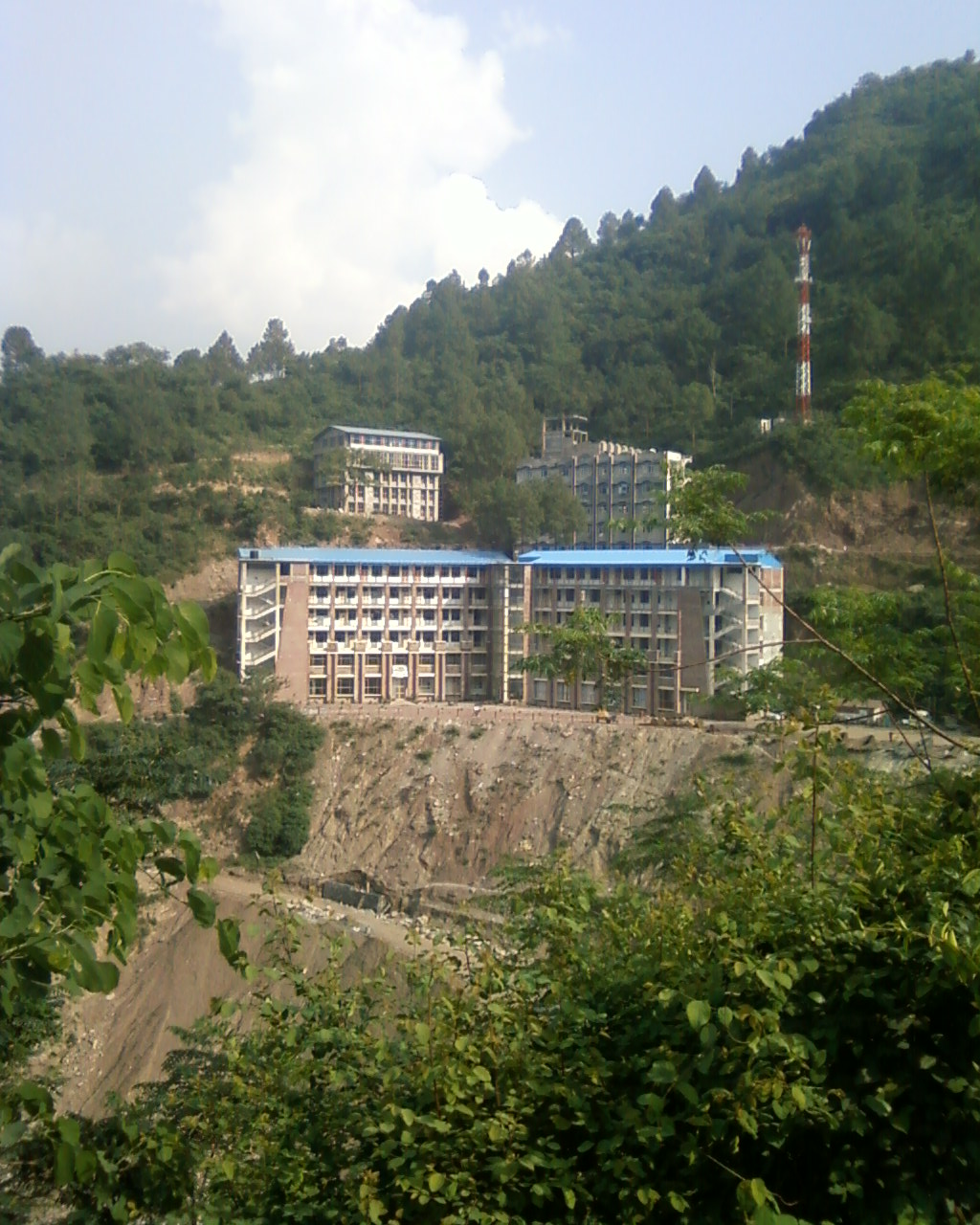
Eternal University, Baru Sahib

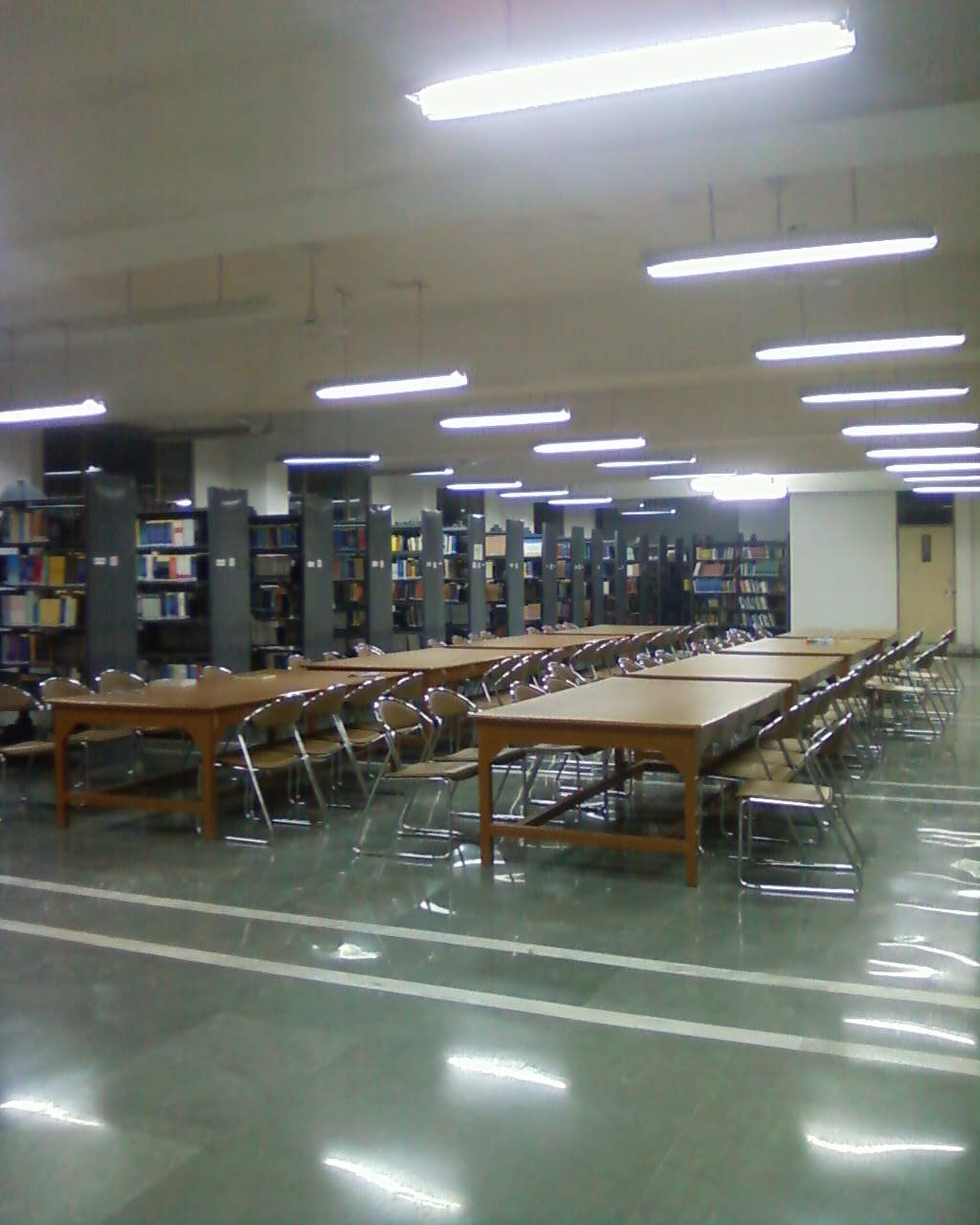
Eternal University Library
