= Iqbal (disambiguation) =

Muhammad Iqbal (1877–1938) was an Islamic philosopher and poet.

Iqbal and variants may also refer to:

== Places ==
=== Iran ===
- Iqbal Metro Station, in Mashhad
- Eqbal, Iran, a village in West Azerbaijan Province
- Eqbal-e Gharbi Rural District, a western provincial district in Qazvin
- Eqbal-e Sharqi Rural District, an eastern provincial district in Qazvin

=== Pakistan ===
Various places named after Muhammad Iqbal:

- Iqbal Manzil, mansion and birthplace of Muhammad Iqbal in Sialkot, Punjab
- Iqbal Park, a park in Lahore
- Iqbal Stadium, a cricket ground in Faisalabad
- Iqbal Town, a commercial and residential locality in Lahore

== Other uses ==
- Iqbal, a former Iranian daily newspaper
- Iqbal (film), a 2005 Indian film
- Iqbal (name), a name and surname
- Major Iqbal (born 1965), alias Chaudhery Khan, a Pakistani Inter-Services Intelligence (ISI) officer; one of the perpetrators of the 2008 Mumbai attacks (26/11)
- Ikbal (title), a title given to the consort of the sultan in the Ottoman Empire
- "Iqbal", a song on Yusef Lateef's 1960 album The Centaur and the Phoenix
- Ashcroft v. Iqbal, a 2008 United States Supreme Court case
  - Twiqbal, a portmanteau related to the case

== See also ==
- Muhammad Iqbal (disambiguation)
