= Mohsin Iqbal =

Indian cricketer (born 1983)

Mohsin Iqbal (born 30 September 1983) is an Indian cricketer. He is a right-handed batsman and a right-arm medium pace bowler who plays for Jammu and Kashmir.

== Early life ==
Iqbal was born in Qazigund, Kashmir.

== Career ==
Iqbal made a single appearance for Jammu and Kashmir Under-16s in 1999, and two seasons later, appeared twice for the Under-19s team. Iqbal made his debut first-class appearance for the senior team against Himachal Pradesh in November 2008. Iqbal has represented University of Bradford, England, UK as captain in the year 2006-2007 and has played for Westwood Cricket Club for one year in which he scored his maiden hundred against Buttershaw A.
