= Iqbal Ashhar =

Indian Poet (born 1965)

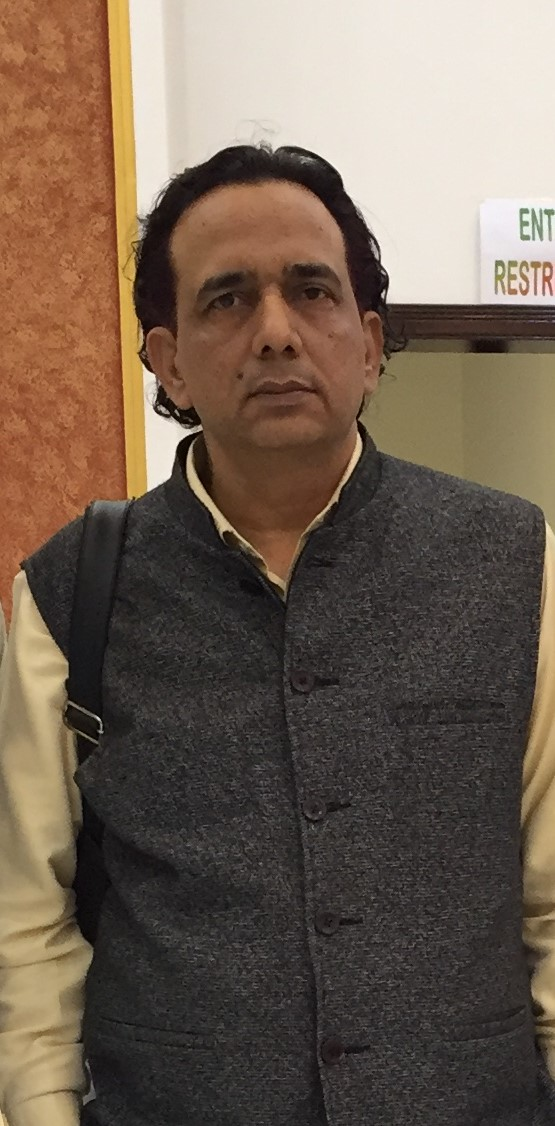
Indian Urdu Poet Iqbal Ashhar

Iqbal Ashar Urdu: اشہر، اقبال Hindi: इक़बाल अशहर (born 26 October 1965) is an Indian Urdu language poet born in Kucha Chelan, Delhi. Iqbal Ashhar is a son of Abdul Lateef and Sakeena Khatoon; his ancestors hailed from Amroha in Western Uttar Pradesh.

== Early life and education ==
Iqbal Ashhar received his primary education from Shanta Nursery School and secondary education from Ramjas School No.1 (Daryaganj).B.A (Honours) in Urdu from Zakir Husain Delhi College.

== Performance ==
Iqbal Ashhar began to attend all-India mushairas in 1998, under the patronage of the late Mauj Rampuri. Professor Wasim Barelvi, Doctor Rahat Indori, Anwar Jalalpuri, Meraj Faizabadi and Munawwar Rana were prominent among the poets who encouraged Iqbal Ashhar. He has attended poetic symposiums in the Districts of India and have also traveled to USA, UK, UAE, Canada, KSA, Kuwait, Qatar, Bahrain, Oman, Pakistan, etc.

== Books ==
1. Dhanak Tere Khayal ki (Hindi and Urdu, 2005)
2. Ratjage (poetry collection, Urdu, 2010)
3. Ratjage (second edition, 2013)
4. Ghazal Sarai (poetry selection)
5. Urdu Hai Mera Naam
