= Muhammad Iqbal (civil servant) =

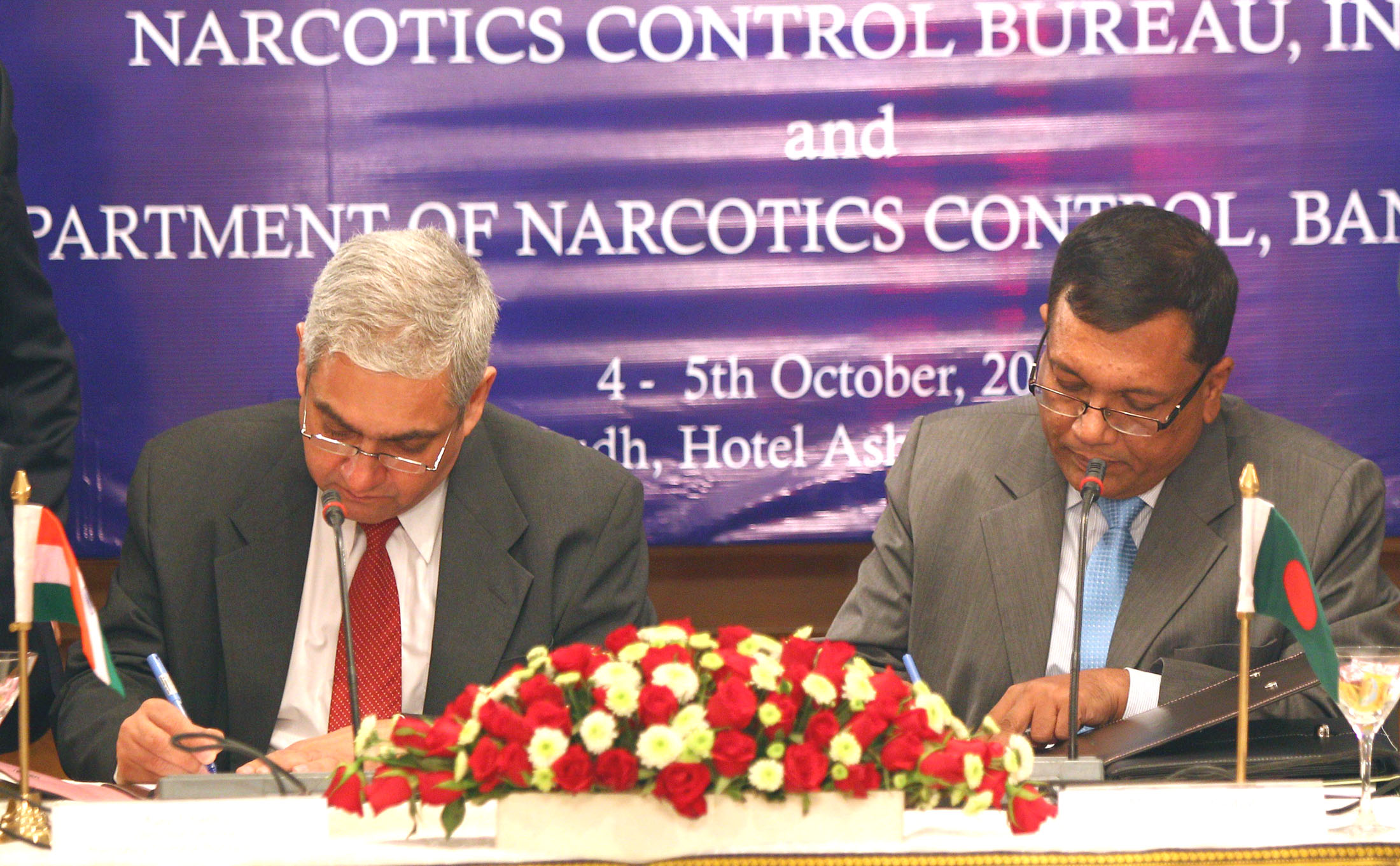
The Director General, Narcotics Control Bureau, India, Ajay Chadha and the Director General, Department of Narcotics Control, Bangladesh, Mohammad Iqbal signing the MoU

Muhammad Iqbal is a retired secretary and former director general of the Department of Narcotics Control. He is a member of the Police Reform Commission of the Muhammad Yunus led interim government. He served in a special committee to examine raising the age limit for entering the Bangladesh Civil Service.

== Early life ==
Iqbal finished his bachelors and master's in law at the University of Dhaka in 1979.

== Career ==
Iqbal joined the Bangladesh Civil Service in 1986 as an admin cadre.

Iqbal completed a Graduate Certificate in Applied Sciences in 1998 at the Charles Sturt University.

While working at the Ministry of Establishment in September 2009, Iqbal was promoted to additional secretary.

In November 2013, Iqbal was appointed director general of the National Institute of Population Research and Training. He was serving as the director general of the Department of Narcotics Control. He identified party and synthetic drugs as new threats to Bangladesh.

Following the fall of the Sheikh Hasina led Awami League government, Iqbal was appointed member of the Police Reform Commission of the Muhammad Yunus led interim government. One of five reform commissions created by the new regime. He was included in a special commission of the Ministry of Public Administration led by Abdul Muyeed Chowdhury to examine raising the maximum age limit for government jobs. The commission recommended raising the age limit to 35 for men and 37 for women. The Police reform commission recommended not considering political identity in police recruitment.
