= Muhammad Zafarullah =

- Citizenship: Pakistani
- Education: University of Strathclyde
- Scientific career
- Fields: Management science
- Workplaces: Pakistan Ordnance Factories Pakistan Broadcasting Corporation Bahauddin Zakariya University

Muhammad Zafarullah is a former professor of management science in Bahauddin Zakariya University, Multan, Pakistan, where he was the Director of the Institute of Management Sciences. He served as Pro Rector, University of Central Punjab, UCP. it was top administrative position. He is replaced by Dr. Nizammuddiun.

== Education ==
Zafarullah obtained Master of Business Administration (MBA) degrees from the Institute of Business Administration, Karachi (1973), and the University of Edinburgh, UK (1985). He obtained his PhD from the University of Strathclyde Business School in Glasgow, UK in 1988.

== Career ==
Zafarullah started his career as management consultant with the Pakistan Ordnance Factories and the Pakistan Broadcasting Corporation for their reorganizations. He also was a consultant for a large irrigation network project in Iraq near Baghdad. In 1990 he became an associate professor at Bahauddin Zakariya University and was promoted to full professor in 1997. He has been Chair of the Department of Business Administration (renamed as "Institute of Management Sciences" in 2001) since 1994. Zafarullah serves on the editorial boards of the Journal of Quality and Technology Management and the International Journal of Quality and Innovation. In addition, he is a member of the academic review board of the International Quality Education Foundation.
