= Iqbal Singh (spiritual leader) =

Indian Sikh educator (1926–2022)

Baba Iqbal Singh Baru Sahib
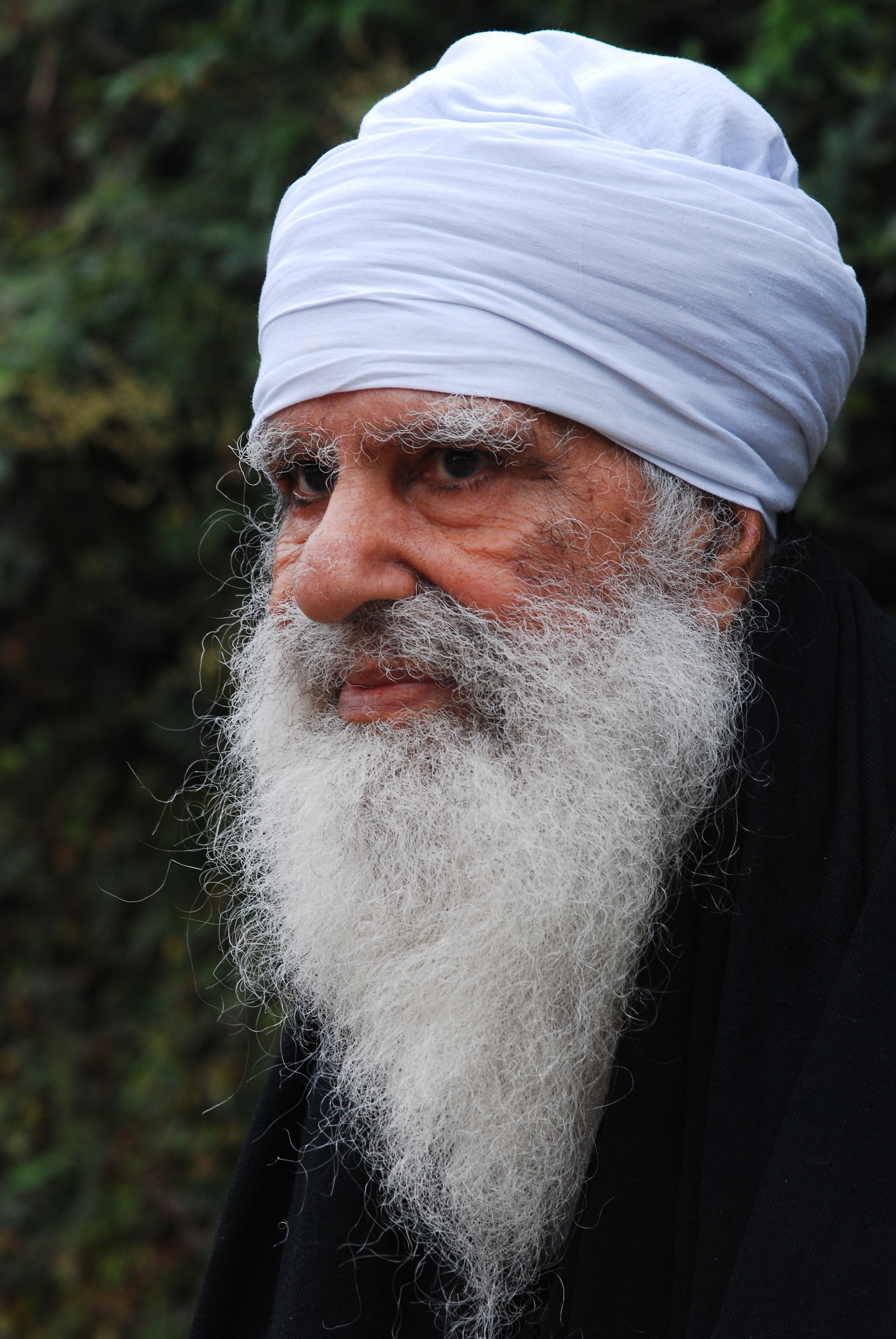
- Born: Iqbal Singh Kingra; 1 May 1926; Bharyal Lehri, Punjab, British Raj
- Died: 29 January 2022 (aged 95); Sirmaur district, Himachal Pradesh, India
- Education: Master of Science (M.sc.) (Agriculture)
- Occupations: Sikh Leader, retired Government official
- Known for: Baru Sahib and Kalgidhar trust
- Website: barusahib.org

Iqbal Singh Kingra (1 May 1926 – 29 January 2022) was an Indian socio-spiritual leader of the Sikh community. He was the Founder President of The Kalgidhar Trust, The Kalgidhar Society and Baru Sahib. He was considered to be one of the most influential Sikhs in the world. He was awarded the Sikh Lifetime Achievement Award in 2016. In 2018 he was bestowed with Shiromani Panth Rattan (precious jewel of the Sikh community) by Takht Sri Harmandir Ji Patna Sahib. In 2022, he was conferred with the Padma Shri by the Government Of India for his contributions in the field of social work.

== Early life ==
Singh was born to Sanwal Singh and wife Gulab Kaur in Bharyal Lehri, Gurdaspur district of Punjab. Young Iqbal Singh was particularly fascinated by the lives of Dhruva and Bhakta prahlada on the one hand and Zorawar Singh and Fateh Singh, the younger Sahibzadas of Guru Gobind Singh on the other hand. While in 6th grade, he was touched by the lives of Sanghamitta and Mahinda, the daughter and son of Ashoka.

== Education and career ==
Singh completed a Bachelor of Science Agriculture in 1949 from Lyallpur, Pakistan. In Pakistan he met Teja Singh Ji and Attar Singh and was influenced by their teachings. He later became disciple of Teja Singh Ji. Singh was highly impressed by their lives and teachings. He remained in constant touch with Teja Singh while pursuing his master's degree in Agriculture science.

Iqbal Singh later worked for the Himachal government. He revealed the hitherto known Tapo Bhoomi at Baru Sahib, which was established in 1956. Later in 1982, Iqbal Singh founded and registered The Kalgidhar Trust and later The Kalgidhar Society.

== Works ==
Iqbal Singh retired in 1986 from his job with the Himachal government. He moved permanently to Baru Sahib after his retirement and immediately started working on Brahm Vidya Kendra. He started the Akal Academy assisted by Khem Singh Gill, with only five students as a one-room school. The school later evolved as a 10+2 English-medium private school, affiliated to Central Board of Secondary Education, New Delhi. This school is now affiliated with the International Baccalaureate for IB Primary Years Programme.

Apart from the educational programs, 129 low-cost schools and two private universities were established by Iqbal Singh at Baru Sahib in Himachal and at several other places in Punjab, Haryana, UP and Rajasthan.

Iqbal Singh has been working with the support of beneficiaries and volunteers in the direction of imparting education in the rural marginalised areas of North India. He believed that rural children are excluded from the mainstream and cannot contribute to the nation's growth, hence the drive to “educate-enshrine-empower” these large masses is necessary.

He established Eternal University at Baru Sahib in 2008 and Akal University, Guru ki Kashi at Damdama Sahib in Punjab in 2015. His biography by Benedict Parmanand was released in April 2017 by former Indian Prime Minister Dr Manmohan Singh in New Delhi.

== Death ==
Singh died in Baru Sahib on 29 January 2022, at the age of 95.

== Books ==
- Sikh Sidhant (2001)
- Sikh Faith (2014)
- Tribute to Saint Teja Singh (2015)
- Turban – The Pride and Honour of India (2008)

== Biography ==
- Benedict Parmanand, Mission to Reboot Punjab through Value-based Education (2016)

== Awards and recognition ==
- In January 2011 he attended a Workshop on Global Development and Institutions Inspired by Faith in South and Central Asia in Dhaka organised by Berkley Center for Religion, Peace, and World Affairs, Georgetown University, Washington, USA
- In November 2013 he was adjudged as the fifth most influential Sikh in the world by World Sikh Awards UK.
- In April 2014 he was awarded a Citation for being an Outstanding Individual, one which is worthy of the esteem of the country, the community, and the Great State of New York in 2014 by the New York City State Assembly for promoting tolerance to all people irrespective of culture or race.
- In December 2014, he attended The Alliance of Religions: Peace Summit of the Americas as a guest of honour and signed the symbolic Peace Agreement
- In March 2016 he was awarded a Lifetime Achievement Award by NICER (National Institute of Cleanliness Education Research).
- Also, Baba Iqbal Singh has been awarded the Sikh Lifetime Achievement Award by Top Sikh 100, London on 19 November 2016.
- Helped fight the Turban ban by FIBA International
- In July 2018, he was bestowed with "Shiromani Panth Rattan" by Takht Sri Harmandir Ji Patna Sahib.
- In 2022, he was conferred with the Padma Shri by the Government Of India for his contributions in the field of social work.

== Controversies ==
Iqbal Singh has been criticised for his take on the early regimen of his students, vegetarian habits and simple dress code of the school. In the institution established by him, students are punished even with expulsion if caught defiling their hair or beards as per Sikh tenets.

Akal Academy became the center of a controversy in 2008. There was an allegation that the 'Turban' was being imposed on them. Akal Academy later replied to the controversy explaining that Sikh students were expected to wear the Turban and that children from other faiths needed to cover their heads with a simple patka (piece of cloth as a headgear).
