= Dhofar (disambiguation) =

Dhofar (Arabic: ظُفَار, romanized: Ẓufār) is a governorate of the Sultanate of Oman.

Dhofar or Zufar may also refer to:

- Dhofar Rebellion, or the Omani Civil War, 1963–1976
- Dhofar Mountains, in southern Oman
- Dhofar Club, an Omani sports club
- Zufar ibn al-Harith al-Kilabi (died c. 694–695), Muslim leader
- Dhofar, an Omani Province-class fast attack craft
- Ẓafār, also romanized as Dhafar or Shofar, an ancient city in Yemen

== See also ==
- Dhofari Arabic, a variety of Arabic spoken around Salalah in Oman
