= Kanza Javed =

Pakistani author and poet

Kanza Javed کنزا جاويد
- کنزا جاويد
- Born: Lahore, Pakistan
- Occupations: Writer, Novelist, Poet
- Writing career
- Language: English
- Genre: Literary Fiction
- Notable works: Ashes, Wine and Dust (novel) What Remains After a Fire (short story collection) Rani (short story) Stray Things Do Not Carry a Soul (short story) It Will Follow You Home (short story) Worry Doll (short story)

Kanza Javed (Urdu: کنزا جاويد) is a Pakistani author and scholar, best known for her novel, Ashes, Wine and Dust and short story collection, What Remains After a Fire.

== Early life and education ==
Kanza Javed was born in Lahore, Pakistan.

She received an MFA in Fiction from West Virginia University, where she won the late Rebecca Mason Perry Award. She was a short-term fellow at University of Massachusetts and a research scholar at Arizona State University; both grants were funded by the United States Educational Foundation in Pakistan.

== Career ==
Javed published her debut book, Ashes, Wine and Dust, in 2015. The novel was shortlisted for the Tibor Jones South Asia Prize. Javed started writing the book when she was 17, and was the first Pakistani and, as of 2020, the youngest writer to be nominated for the award. She had intended to release her book at the Indian Kumaon Literary festival, but was temporarily denied a visa, and released it via Skype in cooperation with the festival instead. Javed later released the book at the Jaipur Literary Festival.

Her short story, It Will Follow You Home, was published in American Literary Review (2020). Her short story, Carry It All was published in The Punch Magazine (2020). Her short story, Rani, won the 2020 International Literary Awards (The Reynolds Price Prize for Short Fiction) and was a finalist at Salamander Fiction Contest 2020.

Her work was also selected as a finalist for The 51st New Millennium Award for Fiction (2021) and The Robert Watson Literary Prize 2021 (Greensboro Review Literary Awards).

Javed was nominated as a Pakistan Super League's Hamaray Heroes 2023 and was presented with an award for her contribution in the field of Pakistani Literature at the final match.

Her book, What Remains After a Fire (2025) is a collection of short stories by Pakistani writer Kanza Javed, published by W. W. Norton and HarperCollins India. The book offers an unflinching portrayal of Pakistani women—both in Pakistan and in the United States—who navigate love, grief, and displacement within deeply patriarchal societies. Through restrained yet lyrical prose, Javed examines exile, belonging, and survival, giving voice to characters who exist in the liminal spaces between tradition and freedom.

The collection has been widely acclaimed. The Daily Mail described it as “an unflinching look at the lives of Pakistani women, both at home and in America…the tales they tell are heartbreaking, brimful of dark truths and pain.” Kirkus Reviews called the stories “skillfully drawn, often heartbreaking reckonings” and praised their moral depth, while Publishers Weekly noted the collection’s “nuanced” storytelling and described it as “an impressive outing.”

Writers and critics have similarly lauded the book’s emotional power and insight. Thrity Umrigar wrote that “What Remains After a Fire blazes with righteous indignation at the plight of its varied characters… A wonderful debut collection that establishes Javed as a writer to watch.” Marjan Kamali described it as “vivid and mesmerizing… powerful and deeply moving.” Aanchal Malhotra called it “a visceral and melancholic collection” that “reveals the dark interiors of the human heart,” while Kali Fajardo-Anstine praised it as “rare and wondrous… crafted and essential, these stories sing.”

Her second book, What Remains After a Fire, was short-listed for the 2022 Santa Fe Writers Project Literary Awards and longlisted for the 2026 Dylan Thomas Literary Award.
