= Teja Singh (preacher) =

Sikh preacher (1877–1965/67)

Sant Teja Singh
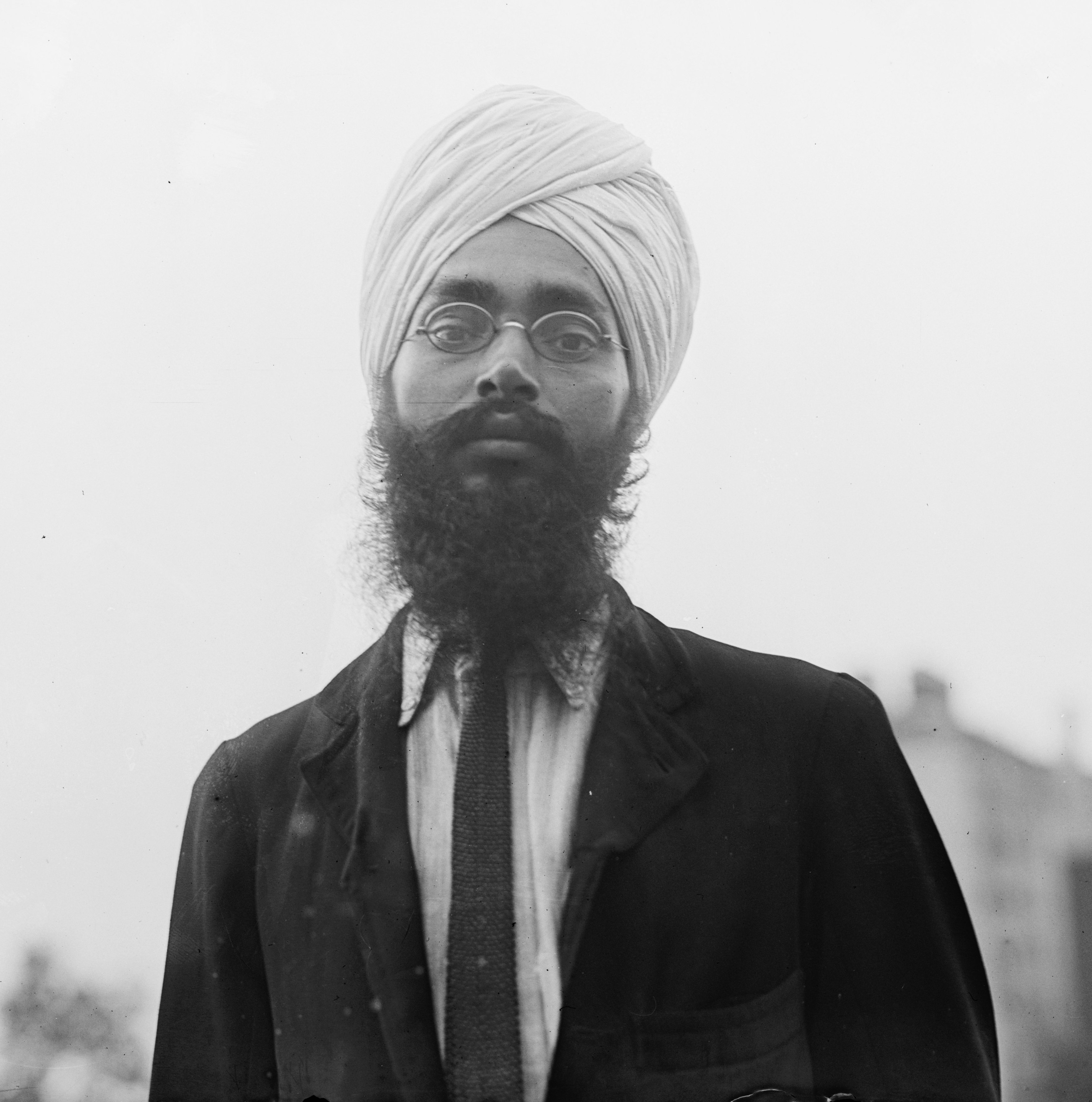
- Born: 14 May 1877; Balowali, Punjab, India
- Died: 1965 or 1967

Teja Singh (14 May 1877 – 1965/1967) was a Sikh scholar, teacher, author, and preacher. (Note: His personal name is alternatively spelt as 'Tejah'.) He was a Cambridge and Columbia University-educated humanitarian, intellectual, and Sikh community leader. He became a role model and trailblazer for the Sikh community due to his Western-education and knowledge in the Sikh religion. Teja Singh was reportedly treated like a “veritable demigod” by his co-religionists.

== Biography ==
=== India ===
Teja Singh was born on 14 May 1877 to a Mehta Khatri family at Balowali, Gujranwala District, Punjab (now in Pakistan) to parents Ralia Singh and Sada Kaur (renamed Ram Kaur after she underwent the Pahul).

=== Canada ===
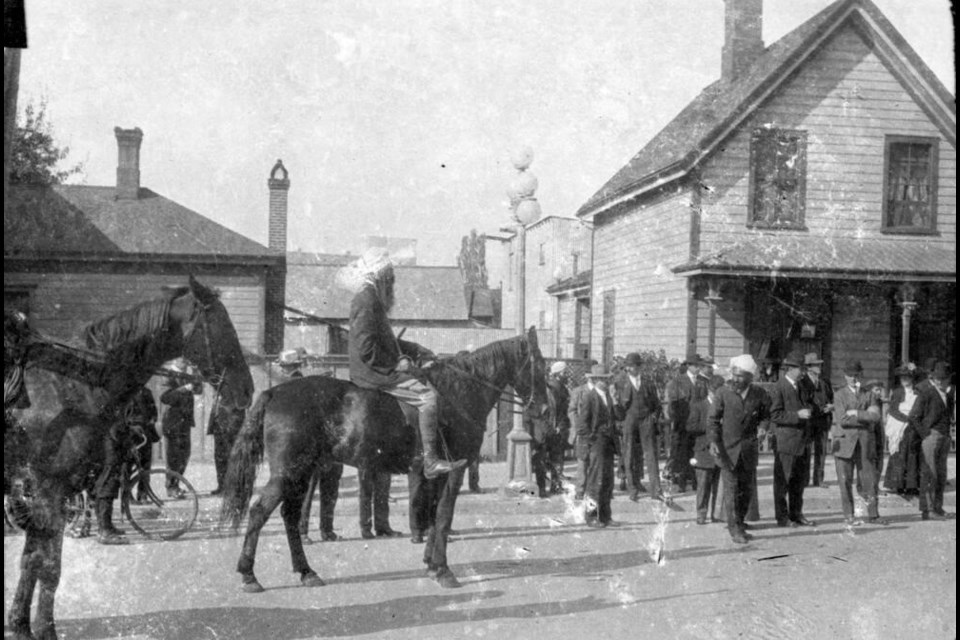
Photograph of Teja Singh on-horseback leading a procession to commemorate the opening of the Khalsa Diwan Sikh Temple in Victoria, taken by Richard Pocock, 6 October 1912

He eventually moved overseas to Canada, where he assisted the local Sikh community and acted as a community leader. In 1908, Teja Singh helped stop a secret Canadian government plan to mass-deport all of its South Asian residents to Belize. Teja Singh also helped kickstart Sikh-Canadian organizations, such as the Khalsa Diwan Society and the Guru Nanak Mining & Trust Company. He provided assistance to Sikhs attempting to immigrate to Canada and fought for the right-to-vote. He helped establish the first purpose-built gurdwara in Victoria in 1912. During the commemoration of the opening of the Khalsa Diwan Sikh Temple in Vancouver in 1912, Teja Singh led the procession to 1210 Topaz Ave. from Government and Herald streets on horseback, with the event being attended by one-fifth of all Canadian-Sikhs at that time. Though tensions between South Asians and White-Canadians had been high, the procession was peaceful and without incident. By the end of the procession, there were more White-Canadians in the crowd than South Asians, as the drawn-in crowds of White folk were curious.

== Death ==
Some sources state his death year was 1965 whilst other give a slightly later death year of 1967.

== Legacy ==
The province of British Columbia declared 1 July 2023 as Sant Teja Singh Day to commemorate his life and accomplishments toward racial equality and justice.

In October 2024, photographs of Teja Singh at a procession commemorating the establishment of the Khalsa Diwan Sikh Temple in Victoria in 1912 that were discovered in the City of Victoria's archives by Jindi Singh and Paneet Singh were revealed to the public.
