= Javed Khan (charity executive) =

- Education: University of Salford
- Occupation: Charity executive
- Employers: Victim Support (-2014); Barnardo's (2014-2021)

Javed Akhter Khan OBE was the chief executive of Barnardo's, the UK's largest children's charity from 2014-2021, having previously been chief executive of Victim Support.

== Early life ==
Khan's parents emigrated from Azad Kashmir, Pakistan, and he grew up in Birmingham, England.

He has a bachelor's degree in mathematics from the University of Salford, after which he trained to be a teacher.

== Career ==
After training to be a teacher, Javed Khan later worked as a director of education in local government, then the Government Office for London, before becoming CEO of Victim Support. In 2014 he was appointed CEO of Barnardos before stepping down in 2021.

In an interview for Sky News in the summer of 2014, Khan sidestepped questions regarding whether a local Police and Crime Commissioner should resign over the systemic failure to tackle the Rotherham child sexual exploitation scandal.

In a November 2016 interview in Management Today, Khan responded to an October 2015 cover story that charities were "in the depths of a serious crisis of trust", citing the need for "authentic and inspirational leadership". In a July 2017 interview with New Philanthropy Capital, Khan explained about how difficult it was to have a real impact.

In October 2021, Khan has been named the 2022 Chair Designate of the new Buckinghamshire, Oxfordshire, and Berkshire West Integrated Care Board.

== Honours ==
In 2015, Khan was awarded an honorary doctorate by Birmingham City University. In June 2018, he was awarded an honorary doctorate by the University of Salford.

He was appointed Officer of the Order of the British Empire (OBE) in the 2021 Birthday Honours for services to young people and education.
