= Iqbal Singh (academic) =

Indian academic

Personal details
- Born: 1972 (age 52–53); Bangalore, India
- Citizenship: United States

Iqbal Singh is an academic in the fields of international relations, human rights and law. Iqbal has conducted research and held teaching positions at various universities across North America and India.

== Academic career ==
After working for MA in political science from Mysore University (First Class First Gold Medal) and MS in Area Studies, he moved to United States and earned a Ph.D. in political science from University of Chicago and JD from University of North Carolina (UNC). Since then he has taught at Marquette, Duke, and National Defense Universities (NDU). Presently he is a Distinguished Professor of Law at the National Law Institute University of India. He was a member of Martin Luther King Commission from 1992 to 1995 working with numerous human rights projects.

His areas of research interest include space law; environment; technology and politics terrorism and international law cyber-terrorism. He has published several titles in the areas of the above research. Over the years he has worked for institutional development; university ranking and reputation management as an advisor to universities.
