= Javid Iqbal (writer) =

Pakistani writer and judge (1924–2015)

Javid Iqbal جاوید اقبال HI
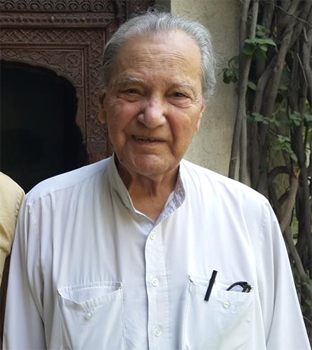
- Iqbal in 2014

Senior Justice of the Supreme Court of Pakistan
- In office 5 October 1986 – 4 October 1989
- Appointed by: Muhammad Zia-ul-Haq
- Preceded by: Ali Hussain Qizilbash
- Succeeded by: Saad Saood Jan

Chief Justice of the Lahore High Court
- In office 8 March 1982 – 5 October 1986
- Appointed by: Muhammad Zia-ul-Haq
- Preceded by: Shamim Hussain Qadri
- Succeeded by: Ghulam Mujaddid Mirza

Personal details
- Born: 5 October 1924 Sialkot, Punjab Province, British India (present-day Punjab, Pakistan)
- Died: 3 October 2015 (aged 90) Lahore, Punjab, Pakistan
- Cause of death: Prostate Cancer
- Resting place: Lahore, Punjab
- Citizenship: (British Raj) British India (1924–1947); Pakistan (1947–2015)
- Spouse: Justice Nasira Iqbal
- Relations: Yousuf Salahuddin (nephew)
- Children: 2 (Walid Iqbal (son) and Munib Iqbal (son)
- Parent(s): Sir Muhammad Iqbal (Father); Sardar Begum (mother)
- Education: Government College University (BA and MA); University of Cambridge (PhD)
- Occupation: Philosopher of Law; Jurist; Court Judge
- National awards: Hilal-i-Imtiaz (2004)

Javid Iqbal (Urdu: جاوید اقبال; 5 October 1924 – 3 October 2015) was a Pakistani writer, philosopher and senior justice of the Supreme Court of Pakistan. He was internationally known for his acclaimed publications on the philosophy of law and modern Islamic philosophy in international and national journals.

He was the son of the Islamic poet and philosopher Muhammad Iqbal, who inspired the Pakistan Movement. Javid authored various books on Pakistan's nationalism movement and political ideology. Apart from philosophy, Javid had a prolific career in the Judiciary of Pakistan and was a former Chief Justice of the Lahore High Court before being elevated to the Supreme Court.

== Early life ==
Javid Iqbal was born in Sialkot, Punjab, British India on 5 October 1924 to Allama Muhammad Iqbal and his second wife, Sardar Begum. His mother died when he was 11, and his father died in 1938 when he was 14.

Javid Iqbal received the following educational degrees and distinctions: BA (Honors) degree in 1944 from the Government College, Lahore; MA degree in English, and MA degree in Philosophy (Gold Medallist) in 1948; Doctor of Philosophy degree in Philosophy in 1954 from the University of Cambridge, UK; and Barrister-at-Law, Lincoln's Inn, London, in 1956. He has received honorary doctorate degrees from Villanova University, United States, and Yarmouk University in Jordan, and Selçuk University in Turkey.

== Career ==
Javid began as an advocate in Lahore High Court, and later became a judge in 1971 and then Chief Justice of the court. He was also a judge in the Supreme Court of Pakistan, and an elected member of the Senate of Pakistan (upper house of Parliament).

He has published papers on Islamic political thought, political ideology in Pakistan and the philosophy of his father, Muhammad Iqbal, which were published in national and international journals. During the years 1960–62 and in 1977, he was the delegate of Pakistan to the United Nations General Assembly.

He had argued in favour of reforms in the Hudud laws of Pakistan from General Zia Ul-Haq ruling period. Javid Iqbal ran against Zulfikar Ali Bhutto on a Pakistan Muslim League ticket in the 1970 General Election in Pakistan, but eventually decided to leave politics. At one time, he even declined Bhutto's offer for him to join Pakistan Peoples Party.

He was married to Nasira Iqbal, a retired Lahore High Court judge.

== Awards and recognition ==
- Hilal-i-Imtiaz (Crescent of Distinction) by the President of Pakistan in 2004.

== Death and legacy ==
Javid Iqbal died on 3 October 2015 at age 90. He was under treatment for cancer at the Shaukat Khanum Memorial Cancer Hospital and Research Centre in Lahore. Among the survivors are his widow Nasira Iqbal and two sons - Walid Iqbal and Munib Iqbal.

Javid Iqbal's funeral at Hazrat Ishaan graveyard at Baghbanpura, Lahore, Pakistan was attended by many Pakistani dignitaries including Chaudhary Nisar Ali Khan, Chief Justice of Pakistan Anwar Zaheer Jamali, former President of Pakistan Muhammad Rafiq Tarar and former Supreme Court judge Khalil-ur-Rehman Ramday.

== Allama Iqbal on his son ==
Javid's father, Allama Iqbal, named his book, Javid Nama, after his son. He also wrote many poems to Javid Iqbal, indirectly addressing the Muslim youth in British India. Javid Iqbal later translated two of Allama Iqbal's books into Urdu – Javid Nama and Reconstruction of religious thought in Islam.

Here is an excerpt from the translation of Bal-i-Jibril (Gabriel's Wing)

TO JAVID
(On Receiving His First Letter From London)

Create a place for thyself in the world of love;
Create a new age, new days, and new nights.

If God grant thee an eye for nature's beauty,
Converse with the silence of flowers; respond to their love.

Do not be beholden to the West's artisans,
Seek thy sustenance in what thy land affords.

My ghazal is the essence of my life-blood,
Create thy elixir of life out 'of this essence.

My way of life is poverty, not the pursuit of wealth;
Barter not thy Selfhood; win a name in adversity.

== Works ==
Javid's publications include the following:

- Ideology of Pakistan (1959)
- Stray Reflections: A Note-Book of Iqbal (1961)
- Legacy of Quaid-e-Azam (1968, published in English and Urdu)
- Mai Lala Faam (1968, collection of papers on Iqbal, in Urdu)
- Zinda Rood (1984, biography of Iqbal in three volumes, in Urdu)
- Afkare-Iqbal (1994, interpretation of Iqbal's thought)
- Pakistan and the Islamic Liberal Movement (1994).
- Jahan-I Javid : darame, Afsane, Maqale
- Islam and Pakistan's Identity
- The Concept of State in Islam : A Reassessment
- Apna Greban Chaak(autobiography) (2002)
- Khutbat e Iqbal
- Iqbal and Tassawwuf, a paper and lecture presented by Dr. Javid Iqbal at the University of California,Berkeley in April 1977

Books on Javid Iqbal

- Life After Iqbal (2016, Fastprint Publishing, UK by Sabeena Khan) ISBN 978-1784563325.
