= Zafar Iqbal =

Zafar Iqbal may refer to:

- Zafar Iqbal (actor) (1950–1991/1992), Bangladeshi actor
- Zafar Iqbal (athlete) (born 1982), Pakistani triple jumper
- Zafar Iqbal (cricketer) (born 1969), Pakistani cricketer
- Zafar Iqbal (field hockey) (born 1956), Indian field hockey player
- Zafar Iqbal (footballer) (born 1965), Pakistani footballer
- Zafar Iqbal (Guantanamo detainee 014), Pakistani detained by the U.S. 2002–2004
- Zafar Iqbal (poet) (born 1932/1933), Pakistani Urdu poet
- Zafar Iqbal (politician) (born 1959), Pakistani politician in the Punjab
- Zafar Iqbal (umpire) (born 1947), Pakistani cricketer and umpire
- Muhammed Zafar Iqbal (born 1952), Bangladeshi science fiction writer and computer scientist
