= Faisal Iqbal =

Faisal Iqbal may refer to:

- Faisal Iqbal (cricketer) (born 1981), Pakistani cricketer
- Faisal Iqbal (footballer) (born 1992), Pakistani footballer
