= Jawaid Iqbal =

Pakistani-born Hong Kong cricketer

Personal information
- Born: 5 February 1972 (age 54); Sialkot, Punjab, Pakistan
- Batting: Right-handed
- Bowling: Off spin
- Role: Bowler

Career statistics
Competition	First-class	ICC Trophy
Matches	1	5
Runs scored	4	34
Batting average	2.00	17.00
100s/50s	0/0	0/0
Top score	3	17*
Balls bowled	66	282
Wickets	0	6
Bowling average	–	29.16
5 wickets in innings	–	0
10 wickets in match	–	0
Best bowling	–	3/29
Catches/stumpings	0/–	0/–
- Source: CricketArchive, 6 January 2008

Jawaid Iqbal is a retired Pakistani-born Hong Kong cricketer. A right-handed batsman and right-arm off spin bowler, he first played for the Hong Kong cricket team in 2000.

== Biography ==
Born in Sialkot in 1972, Jawaid Iqbal first represented Hong Kong in cricket in the 2000 ACC Trophy in the UAE. He next played for them in the 2001 ICC Trophy in Ontario. He played in the ACC Trophy tournaments of 2002 and 2004.

In April 2005, he made his first-class debut, playing against the UAE in the 2005 ICC Intercontinental Cup. He played an ACC Fast Track Countries Tournament match against Malaysia later in the year. His last match to date for Hong Kong was an ACC Premier League match against Singapore in September 2006. He played in a sixes tournament in Hua Hin in April 2007.

Iqbal coached the Hong Kong national under-19 cricket team at the 2019 ACC Under-19 Eastern Region tournament.
