= Iqbal Singh (politician, born 1945) =

Governor of Pondicherry, India

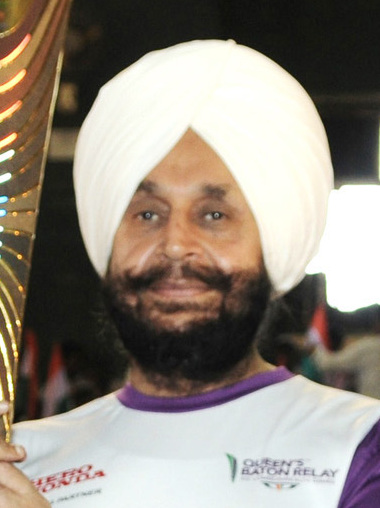

Lieutenant Governor of Puducherry
- In office 27 July 2009 – July 2013
- Preceded by: Surjit Singh Barnala
- Succeeded by: Virendra Kataria

Member, Rajya Sabha
- In office 10 April 1992 – 9 April 1998

Personal details
- Born: 4 June 1945 (age 80); Lahore, British India
- Political party: Indian National Congress
- Spouse: Gurinder Bir Kaur

Iqbal Singh (born 4 June 1945) was the lieutenant governor of Puducherry, India. He took charge in July 2009.

== Politics ==
Singh has the distinction of holding several significant positions in the Indian National Congress, including Secretary, All India Congress Committee for 12 continuous years and was an invitee to Congress Working Committee. He was Member of Parliament of Rajya Sabha from 1992–98.

== Honours ==
In recognition of his contributions, Andhra University had conferred upon him the Honorary Degree of Doctor of Letters (D.Litt.) on 5 December 2009.
