= Neelamraju Ganga Prasada Rao =

Indian geneticist and plant breeder

- Born: 5 September 1927; Korisapadu, Madras Presidency, British India
- Died: 27 July 2016 (aged 88); Hyderabad, Telangana, India
- Education: Andhra University; Indian Agricultural Research Institute; Bihar University; Chandra Shekhar Azad University of Agriculture and Technology
- Known for: Development of hybrid sorghum
- Awards: 1966 C. Subramaniam Gold Medal; 1966 Shanti Swarup Bhatnagar Prize; 1974 Rafi Ahmed Kidwai Award; 1979 VASWIK Award; 2003 Atma Gaurav Award; 2008 Distinguished Agricultural Scientist Award
- Scientific career
- Fields: Genetics; Plant breeding
- Workplaces: Osmania University; Marathwada Agricultural University; Indian Agricultural Research Institute; Agricultural Scientists Recruitment Board

Neelamraju Ganga Prasada Rao (5 September 1927 – 27 July 2016) was an Indian geneticist and plant breeder, known for his efforts in developing hybrid varieties of sorghum, which earned him the moniker, the Father of Hybrid Sorghum. He was the vice chancellor of Vasantrao Naik Marathwada Agricultural University and chaired the Agricultural Scientists Recruitment Board of the Indian Council of Agricultural Research. He was a recipient of several national honors including Rafi Ahmed Kidwai Award and the VASVIK Industrial Research Award. The Council of Scientific and Industrial Research, the apex agency of the Government of India for scientific research, awarded him the Shanti Swarup Bhatnagar Prize for Science and Technology, one of the highest Indian science awards, in 1966, for his contributions to biological sciences.

== Biography ==
N. G. Prasada Rao was born on 5 September 1927 in Korisapadu, Madras Presidency, British India and he graduated in agriculture (BSc) with second rank from Agricultural College, Bapatla, then affiliated to Andhra University (presently affiliated to Acharya N. G. Ranga Agricultural University). After completing his master's degree at the Indian Agricultural Research Institute with a first rank, he secured his PhD from Bihar University in 1958 after which Chandrasekhar Azad University of Agriculture and Technology awarded him the degree of Doctor of Science (DSc). His career started as a lecturer at Osmania University but later joined the Indian Agricultural Research Institute as a plant breeder for sorghum where he served for a number of years as a coordinator of All India Sorghum Improvement Project, head of IARI Hyderabad station and as a Professor of Eminence. During his tenure at IARI, he also served as a faculty member at the College of Agriculture, Hyderabad and at IARI campus in New Delhi. Later he also worked as a Sorghum breeder with International Crops Research Institute for the Semi-Arid Tropics in West Africa before serving as the vice chancellor of Vasantrao Naik Marathwada Agricultural University, and was associated with the Food and Agriculture Organization of the United Nations as a consultant.

Rao was known to have done extensive researches in breeding hybrid varieties of sorghum and his efforts were reported to have assisted in the development of three new varieties, CSH-1, CSH-2 and CSH-9, which returned high yield levels. It also helped the kharif cultivation in the arid areas of India and West Africa, in making sorghum a popular crop, comparable to rice and wheat and in the development of hybrid seed industry in India. He proposed new cropping techniques and his efforts also contributed to the development of other crops such as cotton, red gram and castor. His researches have been documented in over 200 papers published by him in peer reviewed journals. He was associated with Indian Society of Genetics and Plant Breeding and the Society for Millets Improvement and presided over both the societies.

Rao took ill in 2016 and after a short period of illness, died on 27 July 2016, at the age of 88, in Hyderabad.

== Awards and honors ==
The Indian National Science Academy elected Rao as their fellow in 1979, followed by the National Academy of Sciences, India, in 1988. He was also an elected fellow of the National Academy of Agricultural Sciences and the Andhra Pradesh Academy of Sciences. He received the Shanti Swarup Bhatnagar Prize, one of the highest Indian science awards, from the Council of Scientific and Industrial Research in 1966, the same year as he received the C. Subramaniam Gold Medal. He received the Rafi Ahmed Kidwai Award of the Indian Council of Agricultural Research in 1974 and the VASVIK Industrial Research Award in 1979. The Government of Andhra Pradesh honored him with two awards, the Atma Gaurav Award in 2003, and the Distinguished Agricultural Scientist Award in 2008. Acharya N.G. Ranga Agricultural University has instituted an annual award in his honor, for recognizing academic excellence at graduate level courses.

== See also ==
- Indian Agricultural Research Institute
