= P. Ananda Kumar =

Indian molecular biologist and biotechnologist

P. Ananda Kumar is an Indian plant molecular biologist and biotechnologist.

== Education ==
Born in a small village Kuchipudi, near Tenali, Guntur district of South Indian state of Andhra Pradesh Dr Kumar studied in the local S K V High School, VSR and NVR College, Tenali and Siver Jubilee Government College, Kurnool. He acquired M.Sc. degree in botany from Sri Venkateswara University, Tirupati. He joined Agricultural Research Service in 1978 He started his research career at Central Tobacco Research Institute, Rajahmundry. Before Joining ARS, he briefly served Central Rice Research Institute, Cuttack as CSIR Junior Research Fellow from January 1978 to June 1978.

== Career ==
Kumar moved to the Indian Agricultural Research Institute, New Delhi in 1979 and started working in the area of Plant Nitrogen Metabolism. His research contributions lead to the finding that the photorespiratory nitrogen cycle is an open process. He discovered that nitrate reductase enzyme derives its reducing power from photorespiration, considered a wasteful process by many plant physiologists. Kumar acquired Ph.D. degree in plant physiology for his research on photorespiratory ammonia assimilation in crop species. Kumar worked as Alexander von Humboldt Fellow in the University of Hannover, Germany in 1991 and 1992. Chloroplast targeting of cyanobacterial nitrate reductase was achieved in order to link nitrate reduction to photosynthetic electron transport.

=== Biotechnology ===
Having acquired experience in molecular biology, Kumar started working on transgenic crops for insect resistance at Biotechnology Centre of IARI. He developed Bt brinjal and field-tested it in 1995. The "Event 142" that expresses a Bt insecticidal protein Cry1Fa1 is highly effective against Brinjal Shoot and Fruit Borer. The Event 142 was licensed to private companies for commercialization. Another "Event 25" was developed in tomato for protection against Tomato Fruit Borer (Helicoverpa armigera). Event 25 was also licensed to a private company. He also worked in the areas of Bacillus thuringiensis, gene discovery, tissue specific promoters, protein purification and functional genomics of cotton, Ragi and brinjal.

=== Bt Genes ===
Dr Kumar constructed three codon modified genes encoding insecticidal proteins of Bacillus thuringiensis (Bt) viz., CryAc-F, Cry1Fa1 and Cry2Aa. Indian patents were granted for the first two genes. The patent application for cry2Aa gene was published in 2011. Several genetically modified events were generated in major crops by scientists in public research institutions and private companies. These events are currently being tested for biosafety under the GMO regulatory System of India.

=== Genomics ===
Dr Kumar also works in the area of plant genomics. He collaborated with Canadian institutions to sequence the Flax genome. Extensive work was carried out to unravel the genomics of cotton in relation to fibre development and the effect of abiotic and biotic stresses on cotton boll development.

=== NRCPB (NIPB) ===
Dr Kumar was Director of National Research Centre for Plant Biotechnology (NRCPB) located on the campus of Indian Agricultural Research Institute, New Delhi, India. It is currently known as National Institute for Plant Biotechnology NRCPB reached great heights during his tenure (2007–2012). The institute unveiled genome sequences of tomato, Pigeonpea and Linseed. Public-Private Partnership (PPP) was given impetus and several technologies were commercialized. The institute was conferred with 'Sardar Patel Best ICAR Institution Award' by ICAR and 'Mahindra Krishi Sansthan Award' by Mahindra and Mahindra.

=== SPBB ===
Dr Kumar is Secretary of the Society for Plant Biochemistry and Biotechnology (SPBB). Currently he is vice-president of the SPBB. The society publishes a highly rated journal 'Journal of plant Biochemistry and Biotechnology' in collaboration with Springer.

Dr Kumar organized a highly successful international conference at New Delhi (21–24 February 2012) on behalf of SPBB. The conference was inaugurated by Prof. M.S. Swaminathan and attended by more than 600 national and international delegates.

=== ANGRAU ===
Dr Kumar took over the responsibility of heading the 'Institute of Biotechnology' located in Acharya N.G. Ranga Agricultural University (ANGRAU), Hyderabad, India, as Director in August 2013.

=== IIRR (DRR) ===
Dr Kumar moved back to Indian Council of Agricultural Research after the university deputation was completed. He joined Directorate of Rice Research at Hyderabad in April 2015. The institute is currently known as Indian Institute of Rice Reseaech. His research focuses on the root genomics of rice under aerobic and anaerobic conditions.

=== Director, IIRR ===
Dr Kumar has taken charge of Director, IIRR with effect from 1 July 2017. He superannuated from ICAR service on 30 November 2017.

=== Humboldt Fellow ===
After retirement, Dr Kumar joined the Institute of Botany, Leibniz University, Hannover as Alexander von Humboldt Senior Fellow. He worked on regeneration in vitro of a single cell C4 plant species Bienertia sinupersici. He successfully regenerated it via somatic embryogenesis.

=== Scientist Emeritus ===
Dr Kumar joined ICAR-Indian Institute of Rice Research (IIRR) as Scientist Emeritus on October 1, 2018, to continue his research on genomics of rice under aerobic conditions.

=== Editor ===
Dr Kumar is the Production Editor of the Journal of Rice Research published by the Society for Advancement of Rice Research, India.

=== Historian ===
Dr Kumar is an avid scholar and student of Indian history. He started writing on post-Kakatiya period of medieval Indian history in 2021. He published four books, one in Telugu and three in English.

1. ముసునూరి నాయకులు-వారసులు (in Telugu). Ananda Publications, Hyderabad; 2021. 2. Musunuri Nayaks: A Saga of National Resurgence published by Motilal Banarsidass, New Delhi; 2024. 3. Pemmasani Nayaks: Vanguard of Vijayanagara, Ananda Publications, Hyderabad, 2025. 4. Ravella Nayaks: Bulwark of Vijayanagara, Ananda Publications, Hyderabad 2026.

== Awards and honours ==
- Young Scientist Award – INSA-1987.
- Prof Hiralal Chakavarty Award – ISCA
- National Bioscience Award – DBT
- Recognition Award – NAAS-2007.
- VASVIK Award;– VASVIK Foundation-2000.
- Fellow – National Academy of Agricultural Sciences.
- Fellow - National Academy of Sciences, India.
- Fellow - Andhra Pradesh Academy of Sciences - 2016.
- Fellow – Alexander von Humboldt Stiftung, Germany - 1991 and 2018
- Dodla Raghava Reddy Medal - Plant Protection Association of India - 2016.
- Sardar Patel Best ICAR Institution Award - NRCPB (as Director)
- Mahindra Krishi Samriddhi Award - NRCPB (as Director)

== Important Assignments ==
- Member, Genetic Engineering Approval Committee (GEAC), Ministry of Environment and Forests.
- Member, Review Committee on Genetic Manipulation (RCGM), Department of Biotechnology (DBT).
- Chairman, Monitoring and Evaluation Committee (MEC), DBT.
- Member, Research Advisory Committees (RAC) in ICAR-NIPB, CICR, IIPR, IIOR, DFR, NRCB
