= Narinder Singh Randhawa =

Indian scientist (1927–1996)

- Born: 13 March 1927; India
- Died: 26 November 1996 (aged 69)
- Occupations: Agricultural scientist Writer
- Years active: 1967–1996
- Known for: Plant nutrition Soil fertility
- Awards: Padma Bhushan; Rafi Ahmed Kidwai Award; National Citizen Award

Narinder Singh Randhawa (1927–1996) was an Indian agricultural scientist, writer and the director general of the Indian Council of Agricultural Research (ICAR). He was the president of the Indian Society of Soil Science during 1980–81 term and was a recipient of National Citizen Award and Rafi Ahmed Kidwai Award of the Indian Council of Agricultural Research. In 1989, the Government of India awarded him the country's third highest civilian honour, the Padma Bhushan, for his contributions to agricultural science.

== Biography ==
Randhawa, born on 13 March 1927, secured his doctoral degree (PhD) from the University of California in 1964. Returning to India, he joined the All India Coordinated Project on Micronutrients in Soils and Plants of the Indian Council of Agricultural Research as a national coordinator in 1967 and served the project till 1977. During this period, he also served Punjab Agricultural University as a professor at the Department of Soils and stayed at the university till 1979, holding positions such as that of a senior professor, head of the department, dean of the College of Agriculture, and the director of research. In 1979, he returned to ICAR as the deputy director general and continued there till his superannuation in 1985 as the director general. In between, he also had a short stint as a government secretary at the Department of Agricultural Research and Education of the Ministry of Agriculture.

Randhawa was known to have done research in micro-nutrient management of soil and soil fertility and published several books, articles and monographs. He was a member of the Indian National Science Academy Council (1993–95), the research advisory council of the Australian Centre for International Agricultural Research (1986–90) and the consultative group of the CGIAR Consortium of International Agricultural Research Center (1985–90). He presided two science organizations, Indian Society of Soil Sciences and Indian Society of Plant Nutrition and was the vice president of the National Academy of Agricultural Sciences and the vice chair of the International Crops Research Institute for the Semi-Arid Tropics, Hyderabad from 1985 to 1990. He delivered several award orations including the inaugural Dr. S. P. Raychaudhuri Memorial Lecture of the Indian Society of Soil Science (1990) and the Professor N.R. Dhar Memorial Lecture of the National Academy of Sciences, India (1993). The Indian Council of Agricultural Research awarded him the Rafi Ahmed Kidwai Award in 1975 and he received the civilian honor of the Padma Bhushan in 1989. A recipient of the National Citizen Award (1990), he was an elected Fellow of the National Academy of Agricultural Sciences and the Indian National Science Academy.

Randhawa died on 26 November 1996, at the age of 69. The National Academy of Agricultural Sciences have instituted an annual award, Dr. N.S.Randhawa Award, in his honor. His contributions have been compiled in an article, Contributions of Dr. N. S. Randhawa to Indian Horticulture, published in Punjab Horticultural Journal.

== Bibliography ==
- Dalip Singh Sidhu; S. S. Miglani; N. S. Randhawa (1975). Farm business analysis of Sutlej Bed Seed Farm, Ropar, 1974-75. Communication Centre, Punjab Agricultural University.
- J. S. Kanwar, N.S. Randhawa (1978). Micronutrient Research in Soils and Plants in India: A Review. p. 185. ISBN 978-0861865567.
- J. C. Katyal; N. S. Randhawa; Food and Agriculture Organization of the United Nations (1983). Micronutrients. Food and Agriculture Organization of the United Nations. ISBN 978-92-5-101445-5.
- Gurcharan Singh Randhawa; Amitabha Mukhopadhyay (1986). Floriculture in India. Allied Publishers. ISBN 978-81-7023-057-1.
- J. C. Katyal; N. S. Randhawa (1986). Les oligo-éléments. Food & Agriculture Org. ISBN 978-92-5-201445-4.
- N. S. Randhawa (1987). Agricultural Research in India: An Overview of Its Organization, Management and Operations. Food and Agricultural Organization of the United Nations. ISBN 978-92-5-102613-7.
- G. S. Bhalla; N. S. Randhawa; D. S. Tyagi (1989). Implementation and Administration of Agricultural Price Policy in Asia. Food & Agriculture Org. ISBN 978-92-5-102798-1.
- N. S. Randhawa; K. V. Sundaram (1990). Small Farmer Development in Asia and the Pacific: Some Lessons for Strategy Formulation and Planning. Food & Agriculture Org. ISBN 978-92-5-102895-7.
- N.S. Randhawa; Takele Gebre (1991). Multilevel Planning for Agricultural and Rural Development in Ethiopia: Content, Impact and Prospects. FAO.
- N. S. Randhawa; P. B. S. Sarma; National Academy of Agricultural Sciences (1998). National water policy, agricultural scientists' perceptions: proceedings of the round table conference, August 12-14, 1994. National Academy of Agricultural Sciences. ISBN 978-81-900426-1-1.
- N.S. Randhawa, B.S. Parmar (2007). Neem. New Age International Publishers. p. 348. ISBN 978-8122420463.

== See also ==
- Punjab Agricultural University
- Indian Council of Agricultural Research
