= Khem Singh Gill =

Indian geneticist (1930–2019)

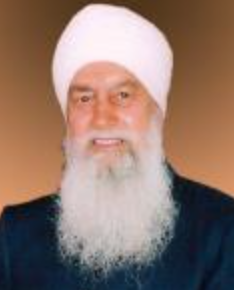
- Born: 1 September 1930; Kaleke, Moga District, Punjab, India
- Died: 17 September 2019 (aged 89)
- Occupations: Geneticist; Plant breeder Academic
- Years active: Since 1951
- Known for: Genetics; Plant breeding
- Spouse: Surjit Kaur Gill
- Children: 3
- Awards: Padma Bhushan; Rafi Ahmed Kidwai Award; ICAR Team Research Award; FICCI Award; ICAR Golden Jubilee Award; ISOR Silver Jubilee Award

Khem Singh Gill (1 September 1930 – 17 September 2019) was an Indian academic, geneticist, plant breeder and Vice-Chancellor of the Punjab Agricultural University. He was known for his contributions to the Green Revolution in India. Instrumental for breeding new strains of wheat, linseed, and sesame, he was the author of the book Research on wheat and triticale in the Punjab along with several additional articles on the subject. He was also the vice-president of The Kalgidhar Trust and The Kalgidhar Society, Baru Sahib, which is one of the largest Sikh charities. A Sant Teja Singh Chair Professor in Sikhism of the Eternal Global University and a founding fellow of The World Academy of Sciences, he was a recipient of Rafi Ahmad Kidwai Memorial Prize, Team Research Award of the Indian Council of Agricultural Research (ICAR), FICCI Award, ICAR Golden Jubilee Award and Silver Jubilee Award of the Indian Society of Oilseeds Research. In 1992, the Government of India awarded him the third highest civilian honor of the Padma Bhushan for his contributions to science.

== Biography ==
Born 1 September 1930 at Kaleke, a small village in the Punjab State of India (presently in Moga district), Khem Singh Gill graduated in Agricultural Science (BSc) from Khalsa College, Amritsar in 1949 and secured his master's degree (MSc) from Punjab University in 1951. He started his career as a research assistant at the Department of Agriculture in Nagrota Bhagwan (Kangra district, Undivided Punjab)under Noted Rice breeder Dr Sohan Singh Saini and later moved to Punjab Agricultural University (PAU) as Assistant Oilseed Breeder before taking a break from work to pursue his doctoral studies at the University of California in 1963. After obtaining his PhD in genetics from the university in 1966, he returned to India and joined Punjab Agricultural University as a professor and the head of the Department of Genetics (1966-1968). Dr. Gill later became a professor and the head of the Department of Plant Breeding (1968–79), Dean of the College of Agriculture (1979–83), Director of Research (1983–87), and Director of Extension Education (1987–89). He eventually earned the post of Vice Chancellor of PAU in 1990.

Dr. Gill Served as Vice Chancellor until 1993. During his tenure at the university, he contributed to the development of the Department of Plant Breeding into a Center of Excellence. His contributions were also reported in the introduction of research programs the Hisar and Ludhiana campuses of the institution. He headed the Wheat Improvement Program of the state government. On the research front, his work assisted in the development of improved cultivars of linseed, sesame, and wheat and in the genetic improvement of pearl millet, barley and triticale. His researches were documented by way of over 475 scientific papers and articles and many books, including Development of triticales for stability of yield and improved quality of grains: Final technical report and Research on wheat and triticale in the Punjab. He also guided 17 doctoral and 8 master's students in their researches.

While serving as the head of the Department of Plant Breeding at PAU, Dr. Gill founded the Crop Improvement Society of India in 1974. He served as its president until 1979, while remaining a loyal patron ever since. He was associated with the International Maize and Wheat Improvement Center as a member of its program committee and board of trustees (1988–93). He was the evaluator of two UNDP programs: sorghum and millets improvement program of International Crops Research Institute for the Semi-Arid Tropics (ICRISAT) in Hyderabad (1981) and rice program of the International Rice Research Institute (IRRI) in the Philippines (1983). Dr. Gill served as the Senior Vice President of the International Triticale Association from 1988 to 1994. He was a council member of the Indian National Science Academy from 1983 to 1985. He was the founding board member of the Kalgidhar Trust, Baru Sahib, an international non-profit charitable organization along with Baba Iqbal Singh who was the president of the board. He was associated with Baba Iqbal Singh since early college days and they both found their mentor in Sant Teja Singh, (MA LLB AM Harvard). Since 1994, Dr. Gill served as chairman of 129 Akal Academies under The Kalgidhar Trust/Society in the rural areas of Northern India.

== Scientific contributions ==
Dr. Khem Singh Gill worked with Nobel Peace Laureate Norman Borlaug in the 1960s to develop new varieties of wheat. Under his leadership, the Department of Plant Breeding received recognition at the international level. His main focus area, however, remained the wheat improvement program. Dr. Gill carried out excellent work in the development and identification of improved varieties of wheat, which revolutionized wheat production in Punjab and several other parts of India and Pakistan. He was one of the main contributors to the Green Revolution in India, which made India a self-reliant country with an added capacity to export grains to other countries. Dr. Gill has over 300 research publications and has authored many books in the area of his expertise (K. S. Gill, personal communication, 22 November 2016).

== Awards and honors ==
Dr. Khem Singh Gill was a founder fellow of The World Academy of Sciences (1974), as well as an elected fellow of the Indian National Science Academy (1981) and the National Academy of Agricultural Sciences (1991). He was also a fellow of the Indian Society of Agricultural Sciences, Indian Society of Genetics and Plant Breeding, Genetic Association of India and the Crop Improvement Society of India. The Indian Council made him a National Professor of Eminence in 1980 and the Eternal Global University conferred the Sant Teja Singh Chair Professorship in Sikhism on him in 2016.

Dr. Gill received the Rafi Ahmed Kidwai Award of the Indian Council of Agricultural Research (ICAR) in 1976 and a cash prize from Punjab Agricultural University in 1978. ICAR honored him again in 1981 with the Team Research Award and he was awarded the FICCI Award in 1985. He received three appreciations from the United States Department of Agriculture, Washington in 1981, 1987 and 1991 and two Wheat Research Medals from the International Maize and Wheat Improvement Center in 1973 and 1993. The Government of India awarded him the civilian honor of the Padma Bhushan in 1992, the same year as he received the Golden Jubilee Award of the Indian Council of Agricultural Research. He was also a recipient of the Silver Jubilee Award of the Indian Society of Oilseed Research in 1993. In 2015, Dr. Gill was conferred Doctor of Science (honoris causa) by Punjab Agricultural University in Ludhiana in Punjab, India.

== Controversy ==
Dr. Khem Singh Gill was involved in a controversy in 1985 when his son, Ranjit Singh Gill, was indicted in the assassination of Lalit Maken and his wife, Geetanjali. Controversy surrounded Maken's alleged involvement in the massacres of Sikhs during the 1984 anti-Sikh genocide in New Delhi. Ranjit was convicted, despite his father's efforts, and sentenced to life imprisonment in 2003. His sentence was later commuted. Ranjit Singh Gill, after the release from incarceration, is involved in community and social development activities.

== See also ==
- Khalsa College, Amritsar
