= Rajendra Singh Paroda =

Indian agricultural scientist

- Born: 1942 (age 82–83); Ajmer, Ajmer State, British India
- Awards: Borlaug Award; Padma Bhushan

Rajendra Singh Paroda (born 1942 in Saradhana Ajmer, Rajasthan) is an Indian agricultural scientist. He was the former Director General of the Indian Council of Agricultural Research (ICAR) and Secretary, Department of Agricultural Research and Education (DARE), Government of India. He was the general president of the Indian Science Congress Association during 2000-2001 and the president of National Academy of Agricultural Sciences (NAAS) from 1998 to 2000. He was elected as the first chairman of the Global Forum on Agricultural Research (GFAR), FAO, Rome from 1998 to 2001. He served as an executive secretary of the Asia Pacific Association of Agricultural Research Institutions (APAARI) based at FAO Regional Office, Bangkok since 1992. He also served as the chairman, board of trustees, ICRISAT, Hyderabad, member of IRRI Board, Los Banos, Philippines and was a member of Advisory Council of Australian Centre for International Agricultural Research (ACIAR), Canberra, and the Commonwealth Agriculture Bureau International (CABI), London.

In 1996, he organised the second International Crop Science Congress in New Delhi. In 2001, he Presided over the Indian Science Congress held at the Indian Agricultural Research Institute, New Delhi, which was inaugurated by the then Prime Minister of India, Atal Behari Bajpai. In 2012, he organised the first Global Conference on Women in Agriculture (GCWA) in New Delhi which was attended by the then President of India, Mrs Pratibha Patil. He served as chairman of the organising committee of the Global Conference on Agricultural Research for Development (GCARD 2) organised jointly by GFAR and CGIAR in October, 2013 at Punta del Este, Uruguay.

As Executive Secretary, APAARI, he had organised by now more than twenty regional expert consultations on thematic areas of high regional importance. Currently he is the President of IARI Alumni Association.

== Awards ==
Rafi Ahmad Kidwai Memorial Prize (1982–83), ICAR Team Research Award (1983–84), FICCI Award (1988), Om Prakash Bhasin Award (1992)' Asia-Pacific Seed Association Special Award (1995), CGIAR Award for Outstanding Partnership (2000), Life Time Award by Association of Agricultural Scientists in America (2001), Dr Harbhajan Singh Memorial Award (2001), Silver Jubilee Commemoration Medal (2001) by the Indian National Science Academy (INSA), Dr B.P. Pal Memorial Award (2003), ISCA Gold Medal for Excellence in Science (2006), Gold Medal from Ministry of Agriculture of Armenia (2006), Life Time Achievement Award of 'Agriculture Today' (2008), Dr A.B. Joshi Memorial Award (2012) presented by Prime Minister of India Manmohan Singh, Prof. Kanniyan Memorial Award (2012), Gold Medal from Ministry of Agriculture of Vietnam (2012) and Krishi Shiromani Samman by Mahindra and Mahindra Ltd. (2013).

He received a Padma Bhushan Award in 1998.

He also received a Norman Borlaug Award on 5 January 2006 from President A.P.J. Abdul Kalam at a function in the 93rd Indian Science Congress held in Hyderabad.

Paroda is a Fellow of almost all Science Academies of India, beside Fellow of Third World Academy of Sciences (TWAS), Russian Academy of Agricultural Sciences, Tajik Academy of Agricultural Sciences, Armenian Academy of Agricultural Sciences and the National Academy of Agricultural Sciences. He is also elected Honorary Member of the American Society of Agronomy and the Crop Science Society of America. He has been conferred honorary D.Sc. Degree by 15 academic institutions including Ohio State University, Indian Agricultural Research Institute, Scientific Council of Agricultural Academy, Republic of Azerbaijan and State Agricultural Universities at Pantnagar, Kanpur, Jorhat, Coimbatore, Hyderabad, Udaipur, Varanasi, Srinagar, Meerut, Bhubneshwar, Ludhiana and Dharwad. He also received Honorary degrees from Agricultural Universities of Azerbaijan, Kyrgyzstan and Tajikistan.

International Crop research Institute for Semi-Arid Tropics (ICRISAT), Hyderabad has named its Gene Bank after him as 'Rajendra S. Paroda Gene Bank'.

Currently, he is serving as the Chairman of the Trust for Advancement of Agricultural Sciences (TAAS) and as the Chairman of Haryana Farmers' Commission.
