= Rajeev Kumar Varshney =

Indian agricultural scientist (born 1973)

Rajeev K Varshney FRS FAA
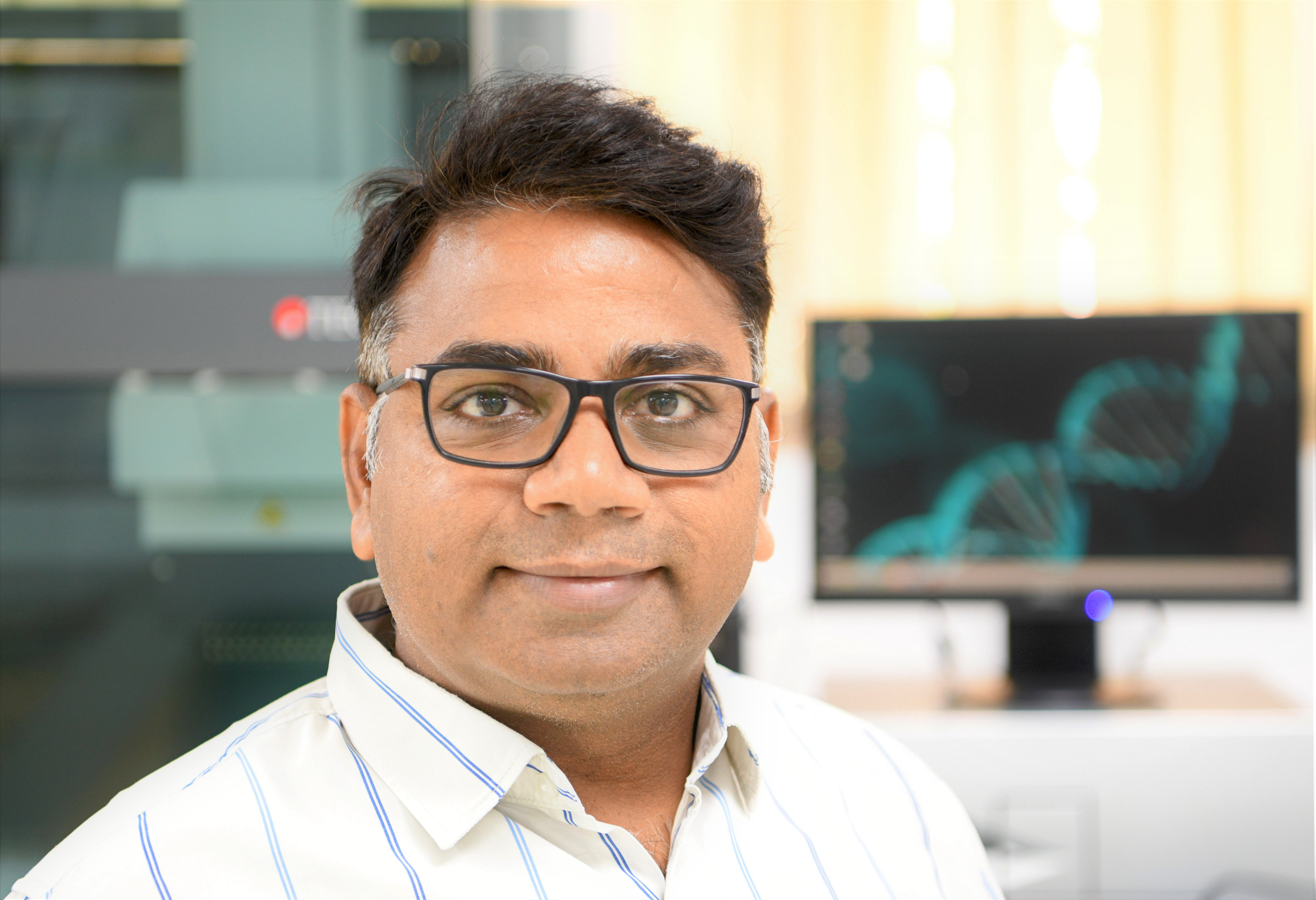
- Citizenship: Australia
- Education: IPK-Gatersleben, Germany; Chaudhary Charan Singh University; Aligarh Muslim University
- Scientific career
- Fields: Agricultural science; Bioinformatics; Computational biology; Genomics
- Workplaces: Murdoch University
- Doctoral advisors: P K Gupta and P C Sharma

Rajeev Kumar Varshney FRS FAA (born 13 July 1973) is an Australian agricultural scientist of Indian origin whose research focuses on genomics, genetics, molecular breeding and crop improvement. As of 2022, he serves as Director of the Western Australian State Agricultural Biotechnology Centre, Director of the Centre for Crop & Food Innovation, and International Chair - Agriculture & Food Security at Murdoch University.

== Early life and education ==
Varshney received his Bachelor of Science (Honours) in botany from Aligarh Muslim University in 1993, followed by a Master's degree in botany (genetics, plant breeding and molecular biology) from the same university in 1995. He earned his PhD in agriculture (molecular biology) in 2001 from Chaudhary Charan Singh University.

== Career ==
Following the completion of his PhD, Varshney worked as a Research Scientist (Wissenschaftlicher Mitarbeiter) at the Leibniz Institute of Plant Genetics & Crop Plant Research (IPK) in Gatersleben, Germany, from 2001 to 2005, focusing on structural and functional genomics of barley and comparative genomics of cereals. In 2005, Varshney joined the International Crops Research Institute for the Semi-Arid Tropics (ICRISAT) as a Senior Scientist for applied genomics. During his tenure, he held various leadership positions:

- 2007: Principal Scientist (applied genomics). Established the Centre for Excellence in Genomics.
- 2007-2013: Dual appointment as Principal Scientist at ICRISAT and sub-programme leader at Generation Challenge Programme, a time-bound CGIAR initiative that closed in 2014.
- 2013-2016: Research Program Director for Grain Legumes.
- 2016-2021: Global Research Program Director for Genetic Grains
- 2007-2022: Director of the Center of Excellence in Genomics & Systems Biology (CEGSB)

In 2022, Varshney joined Murdoch University as Director of the Western Australian Agricultural Biotechnology Centre, Director of the Centre for Crop and Food Innovation, and International Chair - Agriculture and Food Security.

== Research contributions ==
Varshney is recognised for his work on genome sequencing, genetic diversity cataloguing, genomics-assisted breeding and capacity building.

Notable contributions include:

=== Genomic resources, tools and crop improvement ===
Genomic and bioinformatic resources: Varshney has developed extensive genomic resources, including catalogues of genome variations, gene expression atlases, high-density genotyping platforms, genetic maps, and decision support tools for genomics research and breeding applications.

Genome assemblies: He has led and contributed to the development of reference genome sequence assemblies for 19 plant species, including previous 'orphan crops' such as pigeonpea, chickpea, groundnut, pearl millet, mung bean and Jatropha curcas, as well as crops such as adzuki bean, longan, celery and sesame.

Pangenomes and super-pangenomes: Varshney is credited with developing pangenomes for more than a dozen crops, including wheat, chickpea, groundnut, and pea. He has also developed a super-pangenome for chickpea.

Genomics Assisted Breeding: Varshney's work has contributed to the development of improved crop varieties with enhanced drought tolerance, disease resistance, and nutritional quality, particularly benefiting farmers in developing countries across Africa and Asia.

=== Novel concepts ===
Varshney had introduced and popularised several concepts to the field, including genomics-assisted breeding, genic microsatellites, translational genomics for crop improvement, super-pangenomes, and haplotype-based breeding approaches.

== Research impact ==
Notable impacts of Varshney's research include:

=== Development of improved chickpea varieties ===
Varshney, along with researchers from the Indian Council of Agricultural Research and the University of Agricultural Sciences developed several chickpea varieties such as PUSA 10216 and MAC-WR-S-1. PUSA 10216 has demonstrated higher yields in drought conditions , whereas MABC-WR-SA-1, commonly known as 'Super Annigeri-1', improves fusarium wilt resistance.

=== Development of improved groundnut varieties ===
Varshney, along with researchers at ICRISAT and national partners of India, has developed several improved groundnut varieties, including varieties with high oleic acid concentration. When compared to standard peanut varieties, high-oleic peanuts offer longer shelf-life benefits to the food processing industry, health benefits to consumers and increases farmer profitability. By using marker-assisted selection (MAS) and marker-assisted backcrossing (MABC) approaches, Varshney and his collaborators developed a peanut variety which demonstrated an oleic acid concentration of 80+2% compared to the 45-50% found in standard peanut varieties.

=== Tropical Legumes Project ===
Varshney served as Principal Investigator of the Tropical Legumes Project, an initiative led by ICRISAT and funded by the Gates Foundation. The project, which ran from 2007- 2019, was conducted in collaboration with the International Center for Tropical Agriculture (CIAT) and the International Institute of Tropical Agriculture (IITA). The initiative developed 266 improved legume varieties and produced nearly 500,000 tons of seed across multiple legume crops, including cowpeas, pigeonpea, chickpea, common bean, groundnut, and soybean. The project's documented outcomes included groundnut crop interventions, which demonstrated a 32.35% increase in income among participating farmers, with 6.72% of households lifted out of poverty and 14% moved out of food insecurity. In Mali, ten groundnut varieties were released, including six high-yielding, drought-tolerant varieties and four extra-large seeded varieties. Seven additional groundnut varieties with traits including aflatoxin tolerance, early maturation, and drought tolerance were also released. In India, the project's chickpea breeding program contributed to an area enhancement of up to 68% in the national chickpea program. The chickpea program in Ethiopia saw production of certified and quality seed increased from 632 tons to 3,290 tons in six years, a five-fold increase. At the same time, the productivity of chickpea on farms doubled. The project's contributions led to Varshney and ICRISAT receiving the Africa Food Prize in 2021.

== Notable fellowships ==
Varshney holds the following notable fellowships:

- Australian Academy of Technological Sciences & Engineering, 2026.
- Australian Academy of Science, 2025.
- Royal Society, 2023.
- African Academy of Sciences, 2022.
- Indian Academy of Sciences, 2019.
- American Society of Agronomy, 2018.
- American Association for the Advancement of Science, 2016.
- UNESCO-The World Academy of Sciences, 2016.
- German National Academy of Sciences Leopoldina, 2016.
- National Academy of Sciences, India, 2015.
- Crop Science Society of America, 2015
- Indian National Science Academy, 2013.
- National Academy of Agricultural Sciences, India (NAAS) in 2010.

== Notable awards ==
Varshney has received the following notable awards:

- Guangdong Friendship Award, 2023
- International Crop Science Award, 2022
- Asian Scientist 100, Asian Scientist, 2021
- Qilu Friendship Award
- Rafi Ahmed Kidwai Award for contributions to agricultural science, 2019.
- G. D. Birla Award for Scientific Research, 2018.
- Shanti Swarup Bhatnagar Prize for Science and Technology, 2015

Additional accolades include:

- Listed as a Clarivate Highly Cited Researcher for 11 consecutive years (2013-2024)
- "Top Scientist in Agronomy & Crop Science in Australia". The Australian. 8 November 2022.
- Nature Biotechnology Top 25 'Voices of Biotechnology', 2021
- Times of India Top10 most influential Indian scientists, 2019
