= E. A. Siddiq =

Indian agricultural scientist (1937–2026)

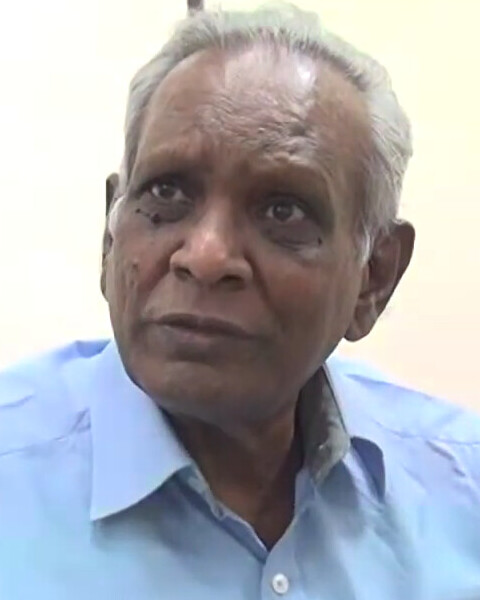
- Siddiq in 2015
- Born: 15 July 1937; Ilayangudi, composite Ramnad district, Madras Province, British India
- Died: 22 January 2026 (aged 88); Hyderabad, Telangana, India
- Occupation: Agricultural scientist
- Awards: Padma Shri; Hari Om Ashram Trust National Award; VASVIK Industrial Research Award; Om Prakash Bhasin Award; Rafi Ahmed Kidwai Award; Borlaug Award; DRR Silver Jubilee Medal; INSA Silver Jubilee Medal; GP Chatterjee Memorial Lecture Award; Agricultural Leadership Award; INSA Professor Sundar Lal Hora Medal; NAAS Dr. B. P. Pal Memorial Award

Ebrahimali Abubacker Siddiq (15 July 1937 – 22 January 2026) was an Indian agricultural scientist, whose research in genetics and plant breeding assisted in the development of various high-yielding rice varieties, such as dwarf basmati and hybrid rice. The government of India honoured Siddiq in 2011 with its fourth-highest civilian award, Padma Shri.

== Background ==
E. A. Siddiq was born on 15 July 1937 in Ilayangudi, a town in Sivaganga District, Madras Province, then a part of British India. His graduate studies were completed in Botany (1959) from the University of Madras following which he obtained masters (1964) and doctoral degrees (1968) in Cytogenetics, under the supervision of renowned botanist, M. S. Swaminathan, from the Indian Agricultural Research Institute (IARI). His career started at his alma mater, the Indian Agricultural Research Institute, as a cytogeneticist in 1968, a post he held till 1976 when he was promoted as the Senior Scientist. In 1983, he was deputed to Egypt as the Rice Breeder and in 1986, he was transferred to Philippines as the Professor of Genetics. In 1987, he returned to India as the Project Director of the Directorate of Rice Research, Hyderabad and worked there till 1994. The next move was to Indian Council of Agricultural Research (ICAR), New Delhi as the Deputy Director General of the Crop Science Division.

In 1997 Siddiq was honoured as the National Professor of ICAR and in 2002, he took charge of the Centre for DNA Fingerprinting and Diagnostics (CDFD) as the Distinguished Chair. On his retirement in 2007, he was appointed the Adjunct Scientist at CFFD. He also held the positions of Adjunct Professor of the University of Hyderabad, Adjunct Professor of the Indian Agricultural Research Institute (IARI) and the Honorary Professor of Biotechnology at Acharya NG Ranga Agricultural University, Hyderabad.

Siddiq died on 22 January 2026, at the age of 88.

== Positions ==
Siddiq was a member of the scientific advisory council of the Prime Minister of India from 2004 to 2009. He sat on the Board of Members of the International Rice Research Institute as well as on the Executive Committee of the Agri Biotech Foundation. He was a member of the working group for the Eleventh Five Year Plan (2007–2012) of India. He was also a member of the Research Advisory Committee of the National Research Centre on Plant Biotechnology, an Indian Council of Agricultural Research (ICAR) subsidiary.

Siddiq was the chairman of the Farm and Rural Science Foundation of The Federation of Andhra Pradesh Chambers of Commerce and Industry. He also served as a council member of National Science academy, India from 1998 till 2000.

== Legacy ==
Siddiq is credited with contributions on the scientific, academic and organizational fronts. His research primarily focussed on genetic research and applied breeding of rice, for improving the yield and quality, and is reported to have assisted in the development of ten high-yielding rice varieties. A variety of dwarf basmati rice (Pusa Basmati-1), claimed to be the first high-yielding variety in its class, and quick maturing varieties such as Pusa 2-21, Pusa 33, Pusa 4 and Pusa 834 are credited to Siddiq. His contribution is also reported in the development of DRRH-1, a first-generation Indian hybrid. Siddiq also did basic research on adaptability, stability and the potential of convergent breeding of various rice breeds. His research also covered the cytogenetic and phylogenetic aspects of rice breeding.

Siddiq was a part of the project for enhancement of rice research in Egypt, under the USAID-funded Rice Breeder programme of International Rice Research Institute (IRRI) in 1987 as well as in the establishment of the Government of India-sponsored National Rice Research Institute in Vietnam. Working as a consultant for the World Bank, he designed the projects for agricultural development in Assam and Bangladesh. He is credited with two scientific studies, one in Egypt and the other in India, in the capacity of the consultant to the Food and Agriculture Organization (FAO).

On the organizational front, Siddiq collaborated with the World Bank/FAO as consultant and adviser and prepared many project proposals for programmes in Egypt, Sri Lanka, India, Indonesia and the Philippines. He also helped in the establishment of rice research institutes in Vietnam and Bangladesh. He was a member of the Task Force on Crop Biotechnology, Monitoring and Evaluation Committee and the National Convenor of the Natural Rice Biotechnology Network during the period from 1990 to 2002.

Siddiq is credited with over 150 research publications, 16 of which have been listed by Microsoft Academic Search in their online repository and his research findings have been cited in many books and journals. He supervised 35 students in their PhD studies and delivered keynote addresses at many conferences.

== Awards and recognitions ==
Siddiq received several honours starting with the Hari Om Ashram Trust National Award in 1976. In 1981, he was awarded the VASVIK Industrial Research Award, followed by Amrik Singh Cheema Award in 1988, Silver Jubilee Medal from the Directorate of Rice Research (DRR) in 1990 and Om Prakash Bhasin Award in 1994. A year later, in 1995, he received the Borlaug Award and the Rafi Ahmed Kidwai Award. Indian National Science Academy honored Siddiq in 1997 with the Silver Jubilee Medal. He also received the GP Chatterjee Memorial Lecture Award of the Indian Science Congress Association in 2001, the Agricultural Leadership Award in 2008 and appreciative mementos from the Government of Tamil Nadu and the Government of Egypt, besides receiving the Professor Sundar Lal Hora Medal of INSA, (2011) and B. P. Pal Memorial Award of National Academy of Agricultural Sciences (NAAS) (2011–12). In 2011, the Government of India included him in the Republic day honours, listing him for the fourth highest civilian award of Padma Shri.

Siddiq was an elected Fellow of the Indian National Science Academy (1995), National Academy of Sciences (India), Allahabad and National Academy of Agricultural Sciences, New Delhi.

== See also ==
- Acharya NG Ranga Agricultural University
- Centre for DNA Fingerprinting and Diagnostics
- Directorate of Rice Research
- Indian Council of Agricultural Research
- International Rice Research Institute
- National Academy of Agricultural Sciences
