= M.L. Jat =

Indian agricultural scientist (born 1971)

Mangi Lal Jat

Secretary, Department of Agricultural Research and Education, Ministry of Agriculture and Farmers' Welfare

Director General, Indian Council of Agricultural Research
- Incumbent
- Assumed office 2025

Personal details
- Born: 4 May 1971 (age 55) Pachkodiya, Rajasthan, India
- Education: Indian Agricultural Research Institute

Mangi Lal Jat (born 4 May 1971) is an Indian agricultural scientist and systems agronomist who serves as the Secretary of the Department of Agricultural Research and Education (DARE) and Director General of the Indian Council of Agricultural Research (ICAR), under the Ministry of Agriculture and Farmers' Welfare.

Jat's research concerns cropping systems, conservation agriculture, climate-smart agriculture, regenerative agriculture, precision farming, scale-appropriate mechanization and farming systems design. He has worked in India, Asia and in Africa.

== Early life and education ==
Mangi Lal Jat was born on 4 May 1971 in Pachkodiya, Rajasthan. He has a Master of Science in Agronomy and subsequently studied at the Indian Agricultural Research Institute (IARI), New Delhi, where he received his PhD in 1999 with a specialization in soil moisture conservation in rainfed pearl millet.

== Career ==
Jat began his scientific career with the Indian Council of Agricultural Research as a scientist at the Project Directorate for Cropping Systems Research, Modipuram, serving from 1998 to 2007. He subsequently served as a senior scientist at the Directorate of Maize Research, New Delhi, from 2007 to 2009.

In 2009, Jat worked with the Food and Agriculture Organization of the United Nations on a mission to Bhutan. He then joined the International Rice Research Institute (IRRI) and the International Maize and Wheat Improvement Center (CIMMYT), working on the Cereal Systems Initiative for South Asia. At CIMMYT, he held a series of positions including Senior Cropping Systems Agronomist, CIMMYT-CCAFS South Asia Coordinator.

He subsequently joined the International Crops Research Institute for the Semi-Arid Tropics (ICRISAT), where he served as Global Research Program Director for Resilient Farm and Food Systems.

== Awards and honours ==
Jat received Rafi Ahmed Kidwai Award in 2018. He was elected a Fellow of the National Academy of Agricultural Sciences in 2016 and is a Fellow of the Indian Society of Agronomy.
