= M. V. Rao =

Indian agricultural scientist (1928–2016)

Mangina Venkateswara Rao
- మంగిన వెంకటేశ్వరరావు
- Born: 21 June 1928; Perupalem, West Godavari District, Andhra Pradesh, India
- Died: 8 March 2016 (aged 87); Hyderabad
- Occupations: Agricultural scientist Geneticist; Plant breeder
- Years active: Since 1956
- Known for: Green revolution in India
- Awards: Padma Shri; Norman Borlaug Award; Linker's Award; Peddireddy Thimma Reddy Award; Dr. P. Siva Reddy Foundation Award; Dr. Srikantia Memorial Award; Environmental Research Academy Gold Medal; Krishi Shiromani Samman; Mahindra Samriddhi India Agri Award; Sivananda Eminent Citizen Award

Mangina Venkateswara Rao (21 June 1928 – 8 March 2016) was an Indian agricultural scientist, plant breeder, and geneticist who was considered as one of the key figures in India’s Green Revolution. He was instrumental in increasing the productivity of wheat and oil seeds in India. He served as the Vice Chancellor of the Acharya N. G. Ranga Agricultural University, Deputy Director of the Indian Council of Agricultural Research (ICAR), and vice president of the National Academy of Agricultural Sciences. He received the Borlaug Award in 1993 and the Padma Shri, India's fourth-highest civilian award, in 1999.

== Biography ==
Rao was born on 21 June 1928 in a Kapu family at Perupalem in West Godavari district, Andhra Pradesh. After securing a master's degree, he continued his research at Purdue University in plant breeding, genetics and plant pathology to obtain a doctoral degree.

After joining the Indian Council of Agricultural Research (ICAR) as assistant wheat breeder in 1956, he was initially involved with wheat research and became an assistant professor in 1958. In 1966, he was promoted as the geneticist and then as senior geneticist, eventually becoming the coordinator in 1971 and the head of the All India Wheat Improvement Project of ICAR in 1978, a post he held till 1981. During this period, he was associated with the Green Revolution in India, related to wheat production. He became the deputy director general (crop sciences) of ICAR in 1981 and stayed in the position till he was appointed as the founder director of the Prime Minister's Technology Mission on Oilseeds, in 1986, a position which holds the rank of a special secretary. It was during this period that the Yellow Revolution, an integrated programme for the development of oilseeds, was initiated and fostered by the government.

In 1989, he was invited to the World Bank as an agriculture expert, where he worked till 1990. The next year, he joined Acharya N. G. Ranga Agricultural University as its vice chancellor and remained there till 1997. While holding the vice-chancellorship, he became associated with Agri Biotech Foundation (ABF - formerly known as Andhra Pradesh Netherlands Biotechnology Programme) as its chairman in 1995 and remained active there. Under his stewardship, the institute has developed several genetically modified seed varieties of cotton, sorghum, castor and red gram.

Rao was a former vice president of the National Academy of Agricultural Sciences (2000–2003) and was associated with several Indian state and central government agencies; chairing the Committee of the New National Seed Policy was one such assignment. He was a member of the task group which prepared guidelines for the formulation of the National Agricultural Technology Project (NATP), a World Bank project for the agricultural development in Bangladesh, and sat on the NATP Scientific Advisory Panel on Coastal Eco System. He was a former member of the board of directors of the International Rice Research Institute (IRRI), India, sitting on the board from 1984 to 1989. He has been a member of the Wheat Advisory Committee of the Food and Agriculture Organization (FAO), a trustee of the International Rice Research Institute, Philippines and a member of the External Expert Panel of the International Maize and Wheat Improvement Center (CIMMYT), Mexico. He was a member of the board of the Intercultural Cooperation Foundation India (ICF) along with Arcot Ramachandran, a renowned Indian anthropologist. Besides his contributions to the Green and Yellow revolutions in India, he has also mentored over 25 research scholars during his stint at the International Rice Research Institute. He died at the age of 87 on March 8, 2016.

== Awards and honours ==
Rao was involved in testing and identifying the best varieties of wheat from Mexico that were then grown in the country. Rao is a recipient of the Norman Borlaug Award and the Linker's Award. The Government of India honoured him with India’s fourth-highest civilian award, the Padma Shri, in 1999. He received the Lifetime Achievement Award of Agricultural Today in 2010. The next year, he was awarded the Krishi Shiromani Samman by the Mahindra Samriddhi India. He is also a recipient of Outstanding Agricultural Scientist Award from the Government of Andhra Pradesh and other awards such as Peddireddy Thimmareddy Award, Dr. Srikantia Memorial Award of the Nutrition Society of India, Dr P. Siva Reddy Foundation Award, and Environmental Research Academy Award.

Rao was an elected fellow of the National Academy of Agricultural Sciences (NAAS). Purdue University, Indian Agricultural Research Institute and Banaras Hindu University have honoured him with the degree of the Doctor of Science (DSc - Honoris causa). He was an honorary fellow of the Indian Oilseeds Research Society, Andhra Pradesh Akademi of Sciences, Indian Society of Genetics and Plant Breeding and Indian Society of Agricultural Sciences and served as the president of all these institutions during various periods.

== See also ==
- Acharya N. G. Ranga Agricultural University
- Indian Council of Agricultural Research
