= Hari Krishan Jain =

Indian cytogeneticist (1930–2019)

- Born: 28 May 1930; Gurgaon, Haryana, India
- Died: 8 April 2019 (aged 88)
- Education: University of Delhi; Indian Agricultural Research Institute; University of Wales
- Known for: Genetic recombination
- Awards: 1966 Shanti Swarup Bhatnagar Prize; 1967 Rafi Ahmed Kidwai Award; 1973 Jawaharlal Nehru Fellowship 1981 Padma Shri; 1982 Norman Bourlaug Award; 1986 Om Prakash Bhasin Award; 1999 National Academy of Agricultural Sciences Dr. B. P. Pal Award; 2004 ISCA B. P. Pal Gold Medal
- Scientific career
- Fields: Cytogenetics; Plant Breeding
- Workplaces: Indian Agricultural Research Institute; International Service for National Agricultural Research; Council for Scientific and Industrial Research

Hari Krishan Jain (28 May 1930 - 8 April 2019) was an Indian cytogeneticist and plant breeder, known for his contributions to the field of genetic recombination and the control of interchromosome level. He is a former chancellor of the Central Agricultural University, Imphal, a former director of the Indian Agriculture Research Institute and a recipient of honours such as Rafi Ahmed Kidwai Award, Borlaug Award and Om Prakash Bhasin Award. The Council of Scientific and Industrial Research, the apex agency of the Government of India for scientific research, awarded him the Shanti Swarup Bhatnagar Prize for Science and Technology, one of the highest Indian science awards, in 1966, for his contributions to biological sciences. He received the fourth highest Indian civilian honor, the Padma Shri, in 1981.

== Biography ==
Hari Krishan Jain, born on 28 May 1930 in a Jain family in Gurgaon, in the Indian state of Haryana to Nemi Chand Jain and Chameli Devi, graduated in botany (BSc hons) from the University of Delhi in 1949 after which he secured an associate-ship from the Indian Agriculture Research Institute (IARI) in 1951. Subsequently, he pursued his doctoral studies at the Aberystwyth campus of the University College of Wales, on a Science Research Scholarship of the Royal Commission, London to secure his PhD and returned to India to start his career as a cytologist at IARI in 1956. He stayed at IARI until his superannuation from service as its Director in 1983 during which time he served as the Head of Genetics Division from 1966 to 1978. In 1984, he became associated with the International Service for National Agricultural Research of the Consultative Group for International Agricultural Research (CGIAR) where he served as the deputy director general. Later, he continued his academic life at the Rajasthan College of Agriculture of Maharana Pratap University of Agriculture and Technology, Udaipur until he was appointed as the chancellor of the Central Agricultural University, Imphal.

Jain is married to Kusum Lata and the couple has two children, Neera and Reena.

== Legacy ==
Jain's early researches on Lilium, a genus of herbaceous plants, and its meiotic cell division revealed the correlation between the chromosome condensation and nucleolar synthesis. After joining IARI, he and his colleagues worked on the cytological mechanisms of genetic recombination, on Delphinium, a perennial flowering plant genus. His work contributed to the development of a protocol for controlling the interchromosome level, which was experimentally evidenced by subsequent researches by others. Later, he worked on tomato and Drosophila (popularly known as fruit flies) and his studies assisted in the discovery of chemical mutagen specificity. He headed the wheat development programs of IARI and initiated three such programs to develop high-yielding varieties of wheat. Ribosomal synthesis in plant cells was another area of his researches. He is credited with developing the concept of national multilineal complex of varieties and the proposal of the multiple and inter-cropping patterns, later popularized by the Indian Agricultural Research Institute. He authored five books which included Plant Breeding: Mendelian to Molecular Approaches Genetics: Principles, Concepts and Implications, and Green Revolution: History, Impact and Future and several articles which document the body of his work.

Jain has served as a member of the Scientific Advisory Committee (SAC-C) to the Government of India (1982–83) and the Uttar Pradesh State Planning Commission (1978–80). He chaired the Food and Agriculture Committee of the Bhabha Atomic Research Centre (1980–83) and the Indian chapter of the Man and the Biosphere Programme of the UNESCO (1978–83) and has been a member of the advisory committee on biotechnology of the Department of Science and Technology (1982–83). He chaired the consultative group on agriculture of the International Council for Science (ICSU) (1973) and is an Emeritus scientist of the Council for Scientific and Industrial Research, having been elected to the position in 1993. He also sat in the council of the Indian National Science Academy from 1979 to 1981 and served as the vice president of the National Academy of Agricultural Sciences from 2009 to 2011.

=== Books ===
- H. K. Jain (1999). Genetics: Principles, Concepts and Implications. Science Pub Inc. p. 438. ISBN 978-1578080540.
- H. K. Jain (1985). Indian Agriculture in 2000 AD. Indian National Science Academy. p. 45. LCCN 85904176.
- H. K. Jain (1989). Organization and structure in national agricultural research systems. International Service for National Agricultural Research. p. 49. LCCN 90129370.
- H. K. Jain (2010). Green Revolution: History, Impact and Future. The Green Revolution: History. ISBN 978-1-933699-63-9.
- H.K. Jain; M.C. Kharkwal (2012). Plant Breeding: Mendelian to Molecular Approaches. Springer Science & Business Media. ISBN 978-94-007-1040-5.

== Awards and honors ==
Jain received the Shanti Swarup Bhatnagar Prize for Science and Technology, the highest award of the Council of Scientific and Industrial Research in 1966 for his contributions to biological sciences. The Indian Council of Agricultural Research awarded him the Rafi Ahmed Kidwai Award the next year and he was elected for the Jawaharlal Nehru Fellowship in 1973 for his project, A Study of the Evolving Concepts of the Genetics and their Agricultural & Social Implications. The Government of India included him in the Republic Day honors list for the civilian award of the Padma Shri in 1981 and he received the Borlaug Award in 1982. The Om Prakash Bhasin Award reached him in 1986 and the National Academy of Agricultural Sciences honored him with Dr. B. P. Pal Award in 1999. He is also a recipient of the B. P. Pal Memorial Award of the Indian Science Congress Association which he received in 2004.

Jain was elected as a fellow of the Indian National Science Academy in 1974 (Note: Jain delivered the INSA Jawarharlal Nehru Birth Centenary Lecture of 1996) and he became an elected fellow of the Indian Academy of Sciences in 1975. Two more Indian academies, the National Academy of Sciences, India and the National Academy of Agricultural Sciences elected him as their fellow in 1988 and 1991 respectively. The Indian Agricultural Research Institute honored him with the degree of Doctor of Science (honoris causa) in 2005 and the Central Agricultural University, where he served as the vice chancellor, instituted an annual award, the Dr. H. K. Jain CAU Award, in his honor in 2015, to recognize excellence in agricultural research.

== See also ==
- Indian Agricultural Research Institute
- Central Agricultural University
- Genetic recombination
- Green Revolution
- Green Revolution in India
