= Ashok K. Mishra =

American economist

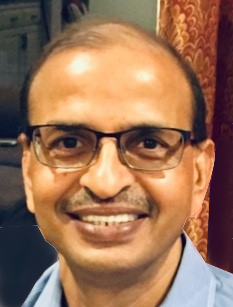

Ashok K. Mishra is the Kemper and Ethel Marley Foundation Chair, Morrison School of Agribusiness in the WP Carey School of Business, at the Arizona State University USA.

Dr. Mishra received a PhD in Economics at North Carolina State University (1996), an M.Sc. in Agricultural Economics at the University of Aberdeen, United Kingdom (1989) and B.Sc. Ag. & A.H. from G.B. Pant University of Agriculture and Technology, Pantnagar, India. He currently conducts research and teaching activities in public policy, risk management, finance, agribusiness, and food security.

== Career ==
Dr. Mishra specializes in identifying and addressing emerging issues within his research and data gathering. He has made contributions to the fields of agriculture and social science.

Dr. Mishra’s research frequently bridges farm-level microeconomics with broader national and international development questions, embodying the systemic approach that Arizona State University champions. Dr. Mishra has presented his work to non-academic audiences including USDA Secretary, OECD, National Public Policy Education Committee, National Agricultural Research, Extension, Education, and Economics Advisory Board and key policy-makers from Office of Management and Budget (OMB) Council of Economic Advisors (CEA) and served on Advisory Board of the European Commission on Agriculture Reform Advisory Board of the Italian Ministry of Education University and Research.

In addition, he has worked to connect US and Asian agricultural economists, and he has built a consortium between US university agricultural economists and the Consultative Group on International Agricultural Research (CGIAR). This partnership partners organizations researching food security, and collaborators include the International Rice Research Institute (IRRI), the International Food Policy Research Institute (IFPRI), the International Crops Research Institute for the Semi-Arid Tropics (ICRISAT), and the International Maize and Wheat Improvement Center (CIMMYT).

== Awards ==
- 2013 Distinguished Achievement in Agriculture Award, Gamma Sigma Delta Honor Society
- 2012 Mid-Career Scholar Rainmaker Award (LSU)
- 2013 Distinguished Faculty Award, (LSU)
- 2012 Gamma Sigma Delta Research Certificate Merit, (LSU)
- 2017 Outstanding College Alumnus, College of Agriculture, G. B. Pant. Univ.of Ag. & Tech, Pantnagar, India
- 2019 Outstanding Alumnus Award, Department of Agricultural and Resource Economics and Economics, NC State University
- 2020 Fellow of the Western Agricultural Economic Association (WAEA)
- 2022 Fellow of the Agricultural and Applied Economics Association (AAEA)
- 2022 Fellow National Academy of Agricultural Sciences (NAAS), India
- 2024 Honorary Life Member (equivalent to a Fellow), International Association of Agricultural Economists (IAAE)

== Outstanding journal article awards ==
- Citation of Excellence-1999, Applied Economics, UK
- 2006 Outstanding Journal Article Award, Journal of Agricultural and Applied Economics
- 2007 Outstanding Journal Article Award, American Journal of Agricultural Economics
- 2017 Highly Commended Award, China Agricultural Economic Review
- 2018 Outstanding Paper Award, Agricultural Finance Review
- 2020 Best Conference paper Award, 2020 CAER-IFPRI Annual International Conference, Chongqing, China
- 2020 Publication of Lasting Impact, AAEA-AFM (for 1997 American Journal of Agricultural Economics (AJAE) article: “Farm income variability and the supply of off-farm labor.")
- 2020-21 Top Cited Article, Agribusiness:An International Journal. “Food Safety Measures and Food Security of Smallholder Dairy Farmers: Empirical Evidence from Bihar, India”
- 2021-22 Top Cited Article, Canadian Journal of Agricultural Economics/Revue, Canadienne D'agroeconomie, "Land rental markets and labor productivity:Evidence from rural China”
- 2022 Outstanding Selected Research Paper, AAEA-LAS, “Aspirations Risk Preferences and Investment in Agricultural Technologies”
- 2022 Publication of Lasting Impact, AAEA-AFM for 2003 American Journal of Agricultural Economics (AJAE) article “The Impacts of Different Farm Programs on Cash Rents"
- 2022-23 Dean's Distinguished Career Research Award, W. P. Carey School of Business, Arizona State University
- 2023 Best Paper, IFAMA 2023 Academic Symposium, Theme: Transforming the global food and fibre system, 2023 IFAMA World Conference, New Zealand
- 2023 Outstanding Journal Article of the Year, Journal of Agricultural and Applied Economics (JAAE). “Production Function and Farmers’ Risk Aversion: A Certainty Equivalent - adjusted Production Function”
- 2023 Outstanding Published Paper, Published in Applied Economic Perspectives and Policy Journal, AAEA-SCE for 2023 “Vertical Coordination and Post-Harvest Losses: Implications on Food Loss”

== Service assignments ==
Dr. Mishra assumed a leadership role in the agricultural economics profession by serving as editor and/or associate editor for five journals and service work for AAEA and SAEA.

- Co-editor of Applied Economic Perspectives and Policy (2011-2013)
- Associate editor of the Agricultural Finance Review journal (2010 to 2020)
- Co-editor of the Journal of Agricultural and Applied Economics (2007-2010)
- Co-editor of Agricultural Economics: An International Journal (2015-2024)
- Editor of the Journal of Agribusiness in Developing and Emerging Economies (2017-2024)
- Editor-In-Chief, Agribusiness: An International Journal (2024–present)

Dr. Mishra serves on the Editorial Board of:

- Land Use Policy
- Journal of Agricultural and Resource Economics
- China Agricultural Economic Review
- Agricultural and Resource Economics Review
- Agricultural Economics Research Review
- Journal of Agricultural and Applied Economics

Served as chair of several AAEA Standing committees:

- Employment Service Committee, 2019-2022
- Economics Statistics and Information Resources Committee, 2014–17
- Selected Papers and Poster Committee, 2009–10
- AAEA Trust Committee, 2016–18; reappointed for 2021-23
- Council on Food, Agricultural, and Resource Economics, 2015–18
- Created South Asia Section (SAS) of the AAEA, 2022

Served as Chair of AAEA sections:

- Chair, Agricultural Finance and Management (AFM), 2014–2015
- Treasurer/Secretary, International Section, AAEA, 2017–19
- Chair, Applied Risk Analysis (ARA) 2019–2021
- Chair South Asia Section (SAS) 2022-2023
- Chairman, Regional Research Committee, NC-1177 Agricultural and Rural Finance Markets in Transition, 2014–16
