= NICRA (disambiguation) =

NICRA may refer to:

- Northern Ireland Civil Rights Association
- National Initiative on Climate Resilient Agriculture, India
- Nickel-chromium alloy, properly NiCrA
- Negotiated Indirect Cost Rate Agreement (NICRA). The United States federal government agreement with nonprofit organizations and similar organizations for the rate at which it will reimburse indirect costs.
