= Himanshu Pathak =

Indian agricultural scientist

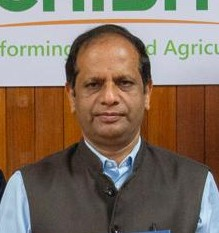
- Born: February 2, 1965 (age 61); West Bengal, India
- Title: Director General, ICRISAT, President, National Academy of Agricultural Sciences
- Scientific career
- Fields: Agricultural science; Climate change; Soil science; Dryland agriculture; Climate resilience
- Institutions: ICRISAT; ICAR; DARE

Himanshu Pathak (born 2 February 1965) is an Indian agricultural scientist. He currently serves as Director General of the International Crops Research Institute for the Semi-Arid Tropics (ICRISAT), headquartered in Hyderabad, India and as the President of National Academy of Agricultural Sciences.

Before joining ICRISAT, as its DG, he served as Secretary, Department of Agricultural Research and Education (DARE) and Director General, Indian Council of Agricultural Research (ICAR). He also served as Chairman of the Agricultural Scientists Recruitment Board (ASRB).

== Education ==
Pathak completed his undergraduate studies in agriculture at Banaras Hindu University in 1986. He obtained his M.Sc. in Environmental Sciences in 1988 and his Ph.D. in 1992 from the Indian Agricultural Research Institute.

== Awards and recognitions ==
- Honorary Member of the Indian Society of Soil Science
- President of the Indian Society of Soil Science, 2024
- Advisory Committee Member of the Research and Innovation Circle of Hyderabad (RICH)
- Alexander von Humboldt Research Fellowship (2004–2005), Germany
- Silver Jubilee Commemoration Medal of the Indian National Science Academy (INSA), 2016
- Award of Appreciation from International Rice Research Institute (IRRI), 2023

== Research ==
Pathak’s research focuses on abiotic stress in crops and the impacts of climate change on agricultural systems. He contributed to the Intergovernmental Panel on Climate Change (IPCC) Fifth Assessment Report. From 2011 to 2015, he served as India’s representative in the United Nations Framework Convention on Climate Change (UNFCCC) negotiations.

== Publications ==
=== Selected works ===
- Pathak H, Fagodiya R.K., Singh A. (2024). Nitrogen, phosphorus and potassium budget in crop production in South-Asia: regional and country trends during the last five decades. Scientific Reports 14:29136. doi:10.1038/s41598-024-77134-x.
