= Smart Food =

- Formation: 2013
- Founder: ICRISAT
- Founded at: Hyderabad, India
- Type: Food, Millets, Sorghum, Legumes, Pulses
- Headquarters: Hyderabad, Telangana, India
- Parent organization: International Crops Research Institute for the Semi-Arid Tropics
- Website: www.smartfood.org

Smart Food is a global initiative led by the ICRISAT (International Crops Research Institute for the Semi-arid Tropics), a member of the CGIAR System Organization, and is jointly led with FARA, CORAF, FANRPAN, and APAARI.

== Overview ==
Smart Food Initiative is launched by ICRISAT in 2013. A major objective under the initiative is to promote the consumption of Millets, Sorghum, and Legumes. Joanna Kane-Potaka, then Assistant Director-General, External Relations, ICRISAT, is the executive director of Smart Food Initiative.

In January 2019, an Executive Council was established through the signing of Memorandums of Understanding. All Executive Council members have equal voting rights: Forum for Agricultural Research in Africa (FARA), Asia-Pacific Association of Agricultural Research Institutions (APAARI), Food Agriculture and Natural Resources Policy Analysis Network (FANRPAN), West and Central African Council for Agricultural Research and Development (CORAF), along with the ICRISAT. In India, Smart Food was co-led by ICAR-IIMR.

First Lady of Niger, Lalla Malika Issoufou became the ambassador of Smart Food in March, 2019.

== The Smart Food approach ==
This initiative leads a campaign to drive demand and to develop value chains for Smart Food crops. To benefit smallholder farmers and poor rural communities via research and outreach programs in countries in East and Southern Africa (Kenya, Tanzania, Malawi), West and Central Africa (Niger, Nigeria, Mali) and Asia Pacific (India, Taiwan, Myanmar). Smart Food initiative envisions Smart Food crops becoming part of regular diets and the food system by building millets, sorghum, and legumes.

== Smart Food reality TV shows ==
In 2017, The first Smart Food reality TV show was held in Kenya. The first Smart Food Culinary Challenge was launched with 58 student chefs from 16 culinary institutes across India. The show was held at the Organics and Millets International Trade Fair in Bengaluru in January, 2019.

== Awards and recognition ==
Smart Food was awarded by USAID and Australian Aid the Winning Innovation at Global Platform Launch Food 2017.

== Key publications ==
The research and publication wing of Smart Food was led by ICRISAT researchers, most notably Anitha Seetha (developmental nutritionist), Takuji W. Tsusaka (development economist), and Joanna Kane-Potaka (communication expert).

- “Does millet consumption contribute to raising blood hemoglobin levels compared to regular refined staples? A systematic review and meta-analysis.” Frontiers in Nutrition 11, 2024.
- “Impact of regular consumption of millets on fasting and post-prandial blood glucose level: a systematic review and meta-analysis.” Frontiers in Sustainable Food Systems 7, 2024.
- “Do Millets Contribute to Food Safety Better than Maize and Other Staple Crops and Commodities?” In Pandemics and Innovative Food Systems, Chapter 3. Boca Raton: CRC Press, 2023.
- “Are Millets More Effective in Managing Hyperlipidaemia and Obesity than Major Cereal Staples? A Systematic Review and Meta-Analysis.” Sustainability 14 (11), 2022.
- “Knowledge, attitude and practice of Malawian farmers on pre- and post- harvest crop management to mitigate aflatoxin contamination in groundnut, maize and sorghum: Implication for behavioral change”. Toxins 11 (12): 716, 2019.
- “How immediate and significant is the outcome of training on diversified diets, hygiene and food safety? An effort to mitigate child undernutrition in rural Malawi.” Public Health Nutrition 21 (6): 1156-1166, 2018.
- “On-farm Assessment of Post-harvest Losses: the Case of Groundnut in Malawi” Socioeconomics Discussion Paper Series 43: International Crops Research Institute for the Semi-Arid Tropics, 59pp, 2017.
