= Rafi Ahmed Kidwai Award =

Indian prize for agricultural research

The Rafi Ahmed Kidwai Award was created by the Indian Council of Agricultural Research (ICAR) in 1956 to recognize Indian researchers in the agricultural field. The award is named after Indian Independence activist Rafi Ahmed Kidwai. Awards are distributed biennially, and takes the form of medals, citations, and cash prizes.

== Awardee list ==
Following is list of the recipients of the Rafi Ahmed Kidwai Award:

- Hiralal Chaudhuri

Rafi Ahmed Kidwai Award
| Year | Name of Awardees | Organization | Remark | Reference |
1967
| 1967 | Hari Krishan Jain | Indian Agriculture Research Institute (IARI) | | |
1971
| 1968 | Pushkarnath | Central Potato Research Institute (CPRI) | | |
1971
| 1971 | S.Y.Padmanabhan | Central Rice Research Institute | Study of blight and blast diseases of rice | http://ipsdis.org/gallery/view/34383 |
1972
| 1972–1973 | T. N. Ramachandra Rao | CFTRI, Mysore | | |
1972
| 1974 | Neelamraju Ganga Prasada Rao | Indian Agricultural Research Institute | | |
1975
| 1975 | Ramamoorthy Bharatula | Indian Agricultural Research Institute | Soil Science & Agricultural Chemistry | |
1976
| 1976 | Khem Singh Gill | Punjab Agricultural University | Plant breeding | |
| 1977 | Triloki Nath Khoshoo | Government of India, Department of Environment | Pollution research | http://www.insaindia.res.in/detail/N77-0376 |
1978-1979
| 1978–1979 | Dr A .S Kahlon | Punjab Agriculture University, Ludhiana | Agriculture Economics | |
1980-1982
| 1980-82 | R. P. Kapil, K. L. Jain, R. C. Sihag, J. P. Chaudhary | Haryana Agricultural University, Hisar | Bees and pollination | |
1984-85
| 1984-85 | K. Pradhan, S.K. Bhatia, N. Krishna | Haryana Agricultural University, Hisar | Animal Nutrition | |
1987
| 1987 | M. S. Aulakh | Punjab Agricultural University (PAU) | | |
1995
| 1995 | E. A. Siddiq | Indian Council of Agricultural Research (ICAR) | | |
1996
| 1996 | J. C. Katyal | Central Research Institute for Dryland Agriculture (CRIDA) | | |
| 1996 | K. Aruna | Acharya N. G. Ranga Agricultural University (ARAU) | Animal nutrition | |
| 1996 | V. M. Mayande | Central Research Institute for Dryland Agriculture (CRIDA) | | |
2000
| 2000 | G. S. Shekhawat | Central Potato Research Institute (CPRI) | | |
2001-2002
| 2001-2002 | Parimal Roy | Central University Laboratory, Tamil Nadu Veterinary and Animal Sciences University, Chennai | Animal health | |
2003-2004
| 2003 | V. Sriramachandra Murthy | Division of Demersal Fisheries, Central Marine Fisheries Research Institute (CMFRI) | Marine fisheries | , |
| 2003–2004 | Fasi-Uz Zaman | Division of Genetics, Indian Agricultural Research Institute (IARI) | Plant breeding | |
| 2003–2004 | P. Dureja | Division of Agricultural Chemicals, Indian Agricultural Research Institute (IARI) | Agro-chemicals | |
2005-2006
| 2005–06 | B. Mishra | Directorate of Wheat Research (DWR) | Rice and wheat | ,, |
| 2005–06 | I. Karunasagar | Karnataka Veterinary, Animal & Fisheries Sciences University (KVAFSU) | Fish and shrimp; food safety | |
| 2005–06 | Nagendra Kumar Singh | NRCPB, IARI New Delhi | Biotechnology | |
| 2005–06 | Aditya Kumar Misra | Project Directorate on Cattle (ICAR) | Animal sciences | |
2006-2007
| 2006–07 | S. K. Pandey | Central Potato Research Institute (CPRI) | Potato production; productivity of small farms | , |
2007-2008
| 2007–2008 | K. C. Bansal (see controversies) | National Research Centre on Plant Biotechnology, Pusa, New Delhi | Transgenic crops | |
| 2007–2008 | S. K. Rao | JNKV Jabalpur | Crop breeding and development | |
| 2007–2008 | P. S. Minhas | Punjab Agricultural University (PAU) | Saline water | |
| 2007–2008 | Sushil Kumar Kamra | CSSRI, Karnal | Drainage of salinated soils | |
| 2007–2008 | Gaya Prasad | CCSHAU Hisar | Bluetongue disease | |
2010
| 2010 | J. S. Bentur | Directorate of Rice Research, Rajendranagar, Hyderabad | Impact of insects on rice crops | |
| 2010 | Narpinder Singh | Department of Food science and Technology, Guru Nanak Dev University, Amritsar | Starch crops | |
| 2010 | Raj Kumar Singh | National Research Centre on Equines, Sirsa Road, Hisar | Animal and fish vaccines | |
| 2010 | Ramesh Chand | NCAP, DPS Marg, Pusa Campus, New Delhi | Impacts of technology on agriculture | |
2012
| 2011 | T. R. Sharma | National Agri-Food Biotechnology Institute | | |
2012
| 2012 | K. V. Prabhu | Joint Director (Research), Indian Agricultural Research Institute, New Delhi | Development of new varieties of grain crops | |
| 2013 | Ashok K Singh | Director, ICAR-Indian Agricultural Research Institute, New Delhi | Genetic improvement of Basmati rice | |
| 2017 | Anjani Kumar | Principal Scientist (Research Fellow), International Food Policy Research Institute, New Delhi | Impact of food safety measures, Vertical Coordination and Poverty. | |
2018
| 2018 | M.L. Jat | Principal Scientist, International Maize and Wheat Improvement Center (CIMMYT) | Outstanding and impact-oriented research contributions in natural resource management and agricultural engineering | |
2019
| 2019 | Rajeev Kumar Varshney | Director, Global Research Program- Genetic Gains, International Crops Research Institute for the Semi-Arid Tropics (ICRISAT) | Outstanding Research in Agricultural Sciences in the category of Crop & Horticultural Sciences | |
| 2019 | Raghavendra Bhatta | Director, ICAR-National Institute of Animal Nutrition and Physiology, (NIANP) | Outstanding Research in Agricultural Sciences in the category of Animal & Fisheries Sciences | |
| 2019 | C. Anandharamakrishnan | Director, Indian Institute of Food Processing Technology (IIFPT) | Outstanding Research in Agricultural Sciences in the category of Natural Resource Management & Agricultural Engineering | |
| 2020 | OP Yadav | Director, ICAR-Central Arid Zone Research Institute (CAZRI), Jodhpur | Outstanding Research Contribution in crop breeding and cultivar development | |

== Controversies ==
There have been several complaints that K.C. Bansal falsified the patent information on the basis of which Kidwai Award (2007–2008) was given to him. The award was given to Bansal for patenting a technique to transfer foreign gene to brinjal chloroplast. It was found that Bansal did not have such a patent to his credit and that he filed an application for patent only after the award was given. The matter got wide publicity in press, media and scientific journals. Several scientists demanded Shri Sharad Pawar, Former minister for agriculture to remove Bansal from the post of director, NBPGR. Questions were raised in Indian Parliament. Tariq Anwer, Minister of State for Agriculture has answered that an enquiry has been initiated to look into the issues. However, reports suggest that ICAR has hushed up the matter and RTI queries for the outcome of the enquiry were not answered.

== See also ==
- List of agriculture awards
