= National Institute for Research on Commercial Agriculture =

Research institute in Rajamahendravaram, India

- Other name: NIRCA
- Type: Public
- Established: 1945
- Affiliations: ICAR
- Director: Dr. Maganti Sheshu Madhav
- Administrative staff: 300
- Location: Rajamahendravaram, Andhra Pradesh, India; 16.98°N 81.78°E
- Campus: Urban
- Website: nirca.org.in

National Institute for Research on Commercial Agriculture (NIRCA) or ICAR-NIRCA (formerly known as ICAR-Central Tobacco Research Institute or ICAR-CTRI) is a central research established in 1947 under the aegis of Indian Central Tobacco Committee (ICTC), Madras. Indian Council of Agricultural Research (ICAR) took over the control of functioning the institute in 1965. It is situated at Rajamahendravaram, Andhra Pradesh, India.

== History ==
In 1945, Government of India constituted Indian Central Tobacco Committee (ICTC) to improve the research activities and production of tobacco in India. To improve research activities, quality control and production of Tobacco, the institute is established in 1947 which was later undertaken by ICAR.

Previously, it was known to be ICAR-Central Tobacco Research Institute or ICAR-CTRI. But in 2025, the name was changed to ICAR-National Institute for Research on Commerce Agriculture or ICAR-NIRCA to broaden its mandate by including by high-value commercial crops such as Chilli, Tumeric, Ashwasgandha, Castor, besides Tobacco, to support the vision.

== Divisions ==
- The institute has six regional research stations at Guntur, Kandukuru, and Jeelugumilli in Andhra Pradesh, and at Hunsur, Karnataka, Vedasandur, Tamil Nadu and Dinhata, West Bengal.

== Publications ==
- Arvind Kumar Srivastava, Achila Singh, D. Damodar Reddy, K. Sarala, H.G. Prakash and N.B. Singh. 2019. Arr-27: A promising hookah tobacco line for sandy loam soils of Uttar Pradesh. Tob. Res. 45(1): 21–26.
- Dam, S.K. and U. Sreedhar. 2019. Evaluation of fungicides against leaf blight incited by Phytophthora parasitica f. sp. nicotianae in Virginia tobacco nurseries. J. Mycopath. Res. 57 (3): 155–158.
- Ghosh, R. K., S. Zareen Khan, Kaushik Banerjee, D. Damodar Reddy, N.R. Johnson and Deb Prasad. 2019. Elucidation of false detection of pesticides during residue analysis in Indian tobacco by multidimensional GC-MS. J. AOAC Int. 103: 1–7.
- Hema, B., K. Viswanatha Reddy, Y. Subbaiah, D. Damodar Reddy and S. Kasturi Krishna. 2018. E-auction system in FCV tobacco: A case to be emulated in other crops. Tob. Res. 44(1): 1–5.
- Krishna Murthy, V., C. Chandrasekhararao and A.V.S.R. Swamy. 2019. Irrigation water quality in chewing tobacco areas of Tamil Nadu. Tob. Res. 45(1):12-20.
- Kasturi Krishna, S., S.V. Krishna Reddy, K. Nageswara Rao and T. Kiran Kumar. 2019. Integrated weed management in FCV tobacco (Nicotiana tabacum) grown under irrigated Alfisols.Tob. Res. 45(1): 33–38.
- Kasturi Krishna, S., S.V. Krishna Reddy and T. Kiran Kumar. 2019. Herbicide efficacy in weed management of tobacco seed beds. Tob. Res. 44(1): 34–37.
  - Kumaresan, M., C.Chandarasekhararao and D. Damodar Reddy. 2019. Effect of methods of irrigation and dates of planting on the yield, economics and water use efficiency of hybrid chewing tobacco (Nicotiana tabacum L.). Tob. Res. 45(1): 48–55.
- Nanda, C., K. Sarala, S. Ramakrishnan and S. Sreenivas. 2018. Screening of FCV tobacco germplasm (N. tabacum) for reaction to TMV infection and identification of resistant donors. Tob. Res. 44(2): 68–73.
- Paramesha, V., Ranjan Parajul, E.B. Chakurkar, G.B. Sreekanth, H.B. Chetan Kumar, P.P. Gokuldas, R. Mahajan Gopal, K.K. Manohara, K. Viswanatha Reddy and N. Ravisankar. 2019. Sustainability, energy budgeting, and life cycle assessment of crop-dairy-fish-poultry mixed farming system for coastal lowlands under humid tropic condition of India. Energy. 188: 1–13.
- Prasad, L. K. and D. Damodar Reddy. 2019. Investigations on water quality in Southern Black Soil region of FCV tobacco in Andhra Pradesh. Tob. Res. 44(1): 24–29.
- Prasad, L. K., S. Ramakrishnan, M. Mahadevaswamy and D. Damodar Reddy. 2019. Trend analysis of rainfall in FCV tobacco growing area of Hunsur under Karnataka Light Soils. Tob. Res. 45(1): 1–5.
- Ramakrishnan, S., S.S. Sreenivas and M. M. Shenoi. 2018. Efficacy of Folio Gold 440 SC against damping off, blight and black shank diseases in FCV tobacco nurseries of KLS. Tob. Res. 44(1): 30–33.
- Sarala, K., K. Baghyalakshmi, K. Prabhakara Rao, D. Damodar Reddy, P. Vinay, G. Kiran and P. Sonia. 2018. Genetic diversity among mutant germplasm accessions of Nicotiana tabacum as determined by morphological parameters. Tob. Res. 44(2): 47–53.
- Sarala, K. and K.Prabhakara Rao. 2018. Detection and characterization of tobacco leaf curl virus isolates infecting FCV tobacco in India. Tob. Res. 44(2): 78–82.
- Sarala, K., K. Prabhakara Rao, K. Baghyalakshmi, D. Damodar Reddy, G. Kiran and K. Shravan kumar. 2019. Morphological diversity in burley tobacco germplasm. Tob. Res. 45(1): 39–47.
- Sreedhar, U. 2018. Evaluation of novaluron + emamectin benzoate against leaf eating caterpillar, Spodoptera litura in tobacco nurseries. Tob. Res. 44(2): 58–62.
- Sreedhar, U. 2019. Field evaluation of new insecticides against budworm, Helicoverpa armigera (Hubner) in flue-cured Virginia tobacco. J. Entomol. Zool. Stud. 7(3): 417–420.
- Sreedhar, U. 2019. Influence of weather on male moth catches of Spodoptera litura in pheromone traps and infestation in Virginia tobacco. Tob. Res. 45(1): 6–11.
- Santosh Swamy, U. Sreedhar, R.D. Prasad, B.S.R. Reddy and P. Sudhakar. 2019. Identification of Trichoderma isolates from tobacco growing regions of West Godavari district, based on sequence analysis of ITS region of rDNA and morphological variations in the strains. Int. J. Curr. Microb. Appl. Sci. 8(6): 1765–1772.
- Supradip Saha, Jashbir Singh, Anindita Paul, Rohan Sarkar, Zareen Khan and Kaushik Banerjee. 2019. Anthocyanin profiling using UV-Vis spectroscopy and liquid chromatography Mass Spectrometry. J. AOAC Int. 103: 1–17.
- Srinivas, A., V. Sudha Rani and I. Sreenivasa Rao. 2019. Construction and standardization of knowledge test to measure the level of knowledge of tribal farmers on seed banking. Curr. J. Appl. Sci. Tech. 35(2): 1–8.
- Venkateswarlu, P., S.S. Sreenivas and P. Nagesh. 2018. Survey for assessment of insect pest incidence on FCVtobacco in Karnataka Light Soils. Tob. Res. 44(1): 44–45.
- Viswanatha Reddy, K., D. Damodar Reddy, B. Hema and A. Srinivas. 2019. Tobacco production in Asia: Impact of WHO-FCTC. Tob. Res. 45(1): 27–32.
