= Vasantrao Naik Marathwada Krishi Vidyapeeth =

Agricultural university in Maharashtra, India

- Former name: Marathwada Agricultural University
- Type: Public
- Established: 1972 (54 years ago)
- Affiliations: ICAR, UGC, AIU, NAAC
- Chancellor: Governor of Maharashtra
- Vice-Chancellor: Dr. Indra Mani
- Location: Parbhani, Maharashtra, India; 19.244°N 76.785°E
- Campus: Multiple sites
- Website: vnmkv.ac.in

Vasantrao Naik Marathwada Krishi Vidyapeeth (VNMKV), formerly Marathwada Krishi Vidyapeeth (MKV), is an agricultural university at Parbhani in the Indian state of Maharashtra.

== History ==
After independence, the first college of Agriculture was established in Parbhani in 1956 by the then State Government of Hyderabad, days before the State Reorganization. And on 18 May 1972, the newly formed State Government of Maharashtra established the Marathwada Agricultural University.

The university's objectives include providing education in agriculture and allied sciences, conducting research based on regional needs, and facilitating technology transfer. It is named after Vasantrao Naik, a former Chief Minister of Maharashtra.

It is funded and regulated by the ICAR, Government of India.

== Academics ==
As of 2025, the university has 12 constituent colleges and 43 affiliated colleges, with a total intake of 4175 students. Constituent colleges have undergraduate, postgraduate and Ph.D. courses, while affiliated colleges have undergraduate courses alone. The university also has 9 constituent and 53 affiliated agriculture schools, with a total intake of 3270 students.

== Constituent colleges ==
The constituent colleges are:

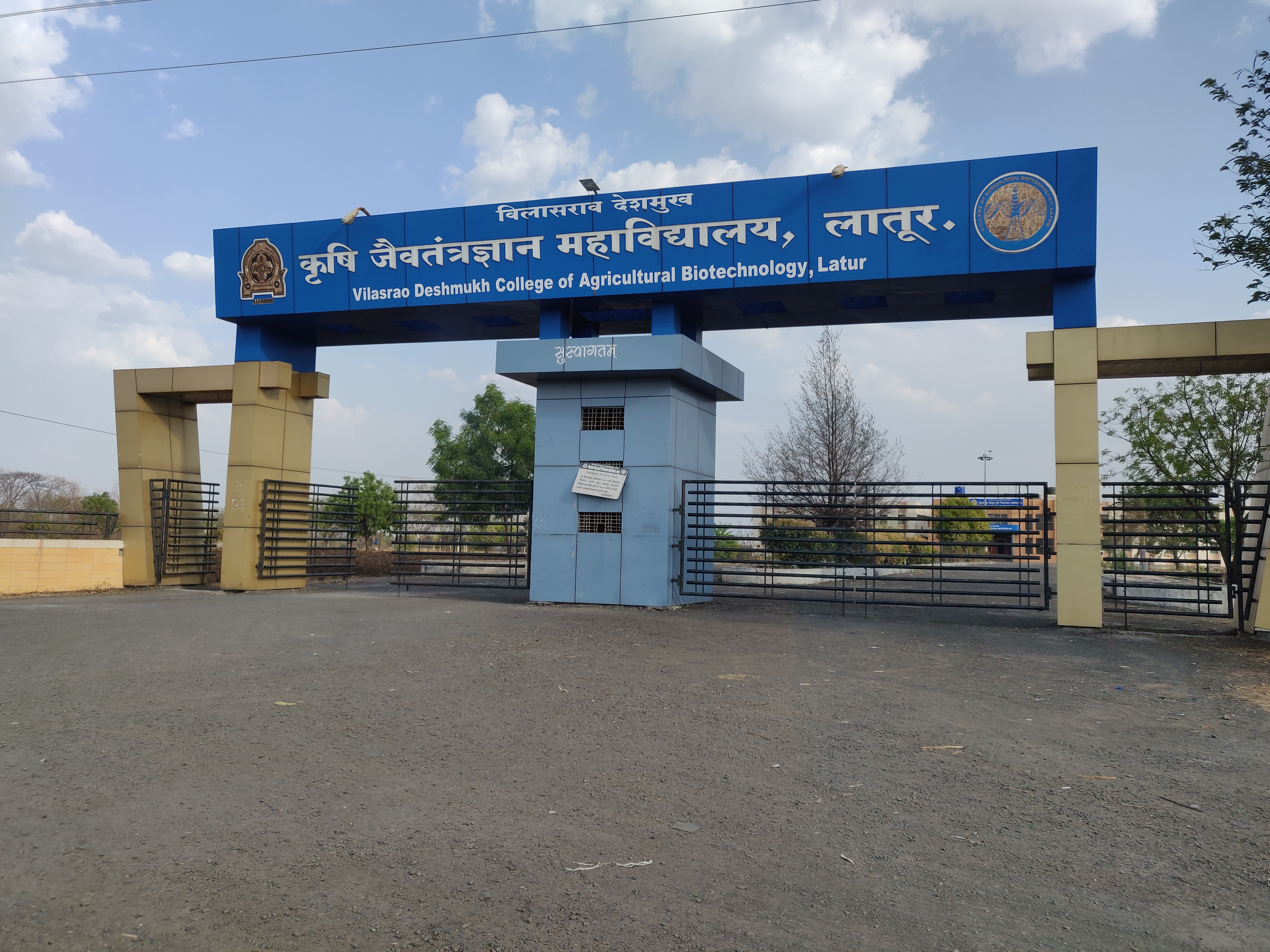
Entrance of Vilasrao Deshmukh College of Agricultural Biotechnology, Latur

- College of Agriculture - Parbhani
- College of Agriculture - Latur
- College of Agriculture - Dongarshelki Tanda, Udgir (Latur Dist)
- College of Agriculture - Badnapur
- College of Agriculture - Ambajogai
- College of Agriculture - Osmanabad
- College of Agriculture - Golegaon
- College of Horticulture - Parbhani
- College of Food Technology - Parbhani
- College of Agricultural Engineering and Technology - Parbhani
- College of Community Science - Parbhani
- Vilasrao Deshmukh College of Agricultural Biotechnology - Latur
- Postgraduate Institute of Agricultural Business Management - Chakur
