= National Bureau of Fish Genetic Resources =

Indian research organization

- Type: Public / Research Institute
- Established: 1983
- Affiliations: Autonomous
- Location: Lucknow, Uttar Pradesh, India
- Campus: Urban

The National Bureau of Fish Genetic Resources is a research organization established in December 1983. It operates under the Indian Council of Agricultural Research handles the conservation of fish genetic resources of the country, including sustainability and intellectual property protection.

In 1999, it moved to the 52-acre new premises at Canal Ring Road, Telibag, Dilkusha, Lucknow. They work to identify, document, and conserve the genetic diversity of fish species, which is important for maintaining healthy and sustainable fish populations. Their research helps support the development of policies and practices for sustainable aquaculture and fishing, as well as for conserving important fish species for future generations. Scientists at NBFGR deliver talks on government programs for aquaculture farmers.

In May 2025, a team of researchers from NBGGR and Gauhati University, Lady Keane College in Shillong, discovered a new species of cave-dwelling fish in Meghalaya’s Mawsynram town.
