= Central Potato Research Institute =

Indian research institute

The ICAR-Central Potato Research Institute (also called ICAR-CPRI Shimla) is India's public non-profit potato research institute located in Shimla, Himachal Pradesh, India. It is an autonomous institute under the Indian Council of Agricultural Research, Ministry of Agriculture and Farmers' Welfare of the Government of India.

The incumbent director of ICAR-CPRI Shimla is Dr. Brajesh Singh.

== History ==
ICAR-CPRI was established in August 1949 at Patna, Bihar on the recommendation of the then-Agricultural Advisor to the Government of India, Sir Herbert Steward with the objective of developing varieties of potato, expansion of potato cultivation and the cultivation techniques suitable as per local conditions. In 1956, the institute was shifted to Shimla, Himachal Pradesh in order to facilitate hybridization work in potato breeding and maintain seed potato health.

It was transferred to the ICAR in April 1966.

== Potato varities ==
In July 2026, the Government of India notified two potato varieties developed by the institute, Kufri Abhedya and Kufri Ruby, for commercial cultivation. Kufri Abhedya, a table potato recommended for hill regions, is resistant to both late blight and potato cyst nematodes, and it was described it as the first high-yielding Indian potato variety resistant to both nematode species.

== Regional stations ==
- Regional Station, Modipuram, Meerut, UP
- Regional Station, Jalandhar, Punjab
- Regional Station, Gwalior, MP
- Regional Station, Patna, Bihar
- Regional Station, Shillong, Meghalaya
- Regional Station, Ooty, Tamil Nadu
- Regional Station, Kufri-Fagu Unit, Shimla, HP
- Regional Station, Rajgurunagar, Pune, Maharashtra
