= Central Research Institute for Dryland Agriculture =

Indian research institute

The Central Research Institute for Dryland Agriculture (CRIDA) is an institute under the Indian Council of Agricultural Research. It was formed in 1985 as the Project Directorate of the All India Coordinated Research Project for Dryland Agriculture. The institute was set up with the intention of undertaking agricultural research activities in areas that have low rainfall.
