= Borlaug Award =

Indian science award

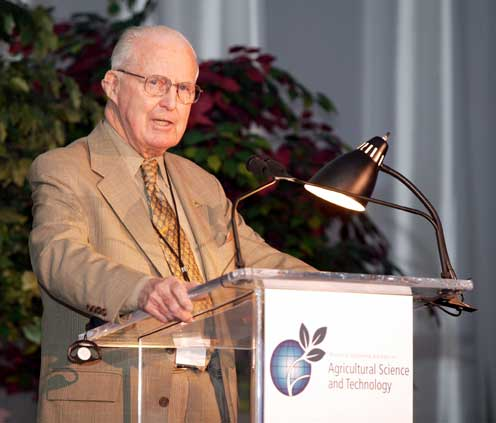
Norman Borlaug

The Borlaug Award is an award recognition conferred by Coromandel International for outstanding Indian scientists for their research and contributions in the field of agriculture and environment. The award was created in 1972 and named in honour of Nobel Laureate Norman E. Borlaug. It carries a cash prize of ₹5,00,000, a gold medal, and a citation.

The award should not be confused with the IFA Norman Borlaug Award of the International Fertilizer Industry Association or the Borlaug Award for Field Research given by the World Food Prize Foundation.

== Recipients ==
- 2020: Kajal Chakraborty
- 2012: K.V. Prabhu and Ashok Kumar Singh
- 2006: Rajendra Singh Paroda
- 2005: Rattan Lal and Subramaniam Nagarajan
- 2004: I. V. Subba Rao and Suman Sahai
- 2000: Anil Agarwal
- 1998: Palpu Pushpangadan
- 1997: Azra Quraishi
- 1995: Ebrahimali Abubacker Siddiq
- 1993: M. V. Rao
- 1991: Amrita Patel
- 1985: Virender Lal Chopra
- 1983: Nanjappa Shamanna Subba Rao
- 1982: Hari Krishan Jain
- 1979: Bishwajit Choudhury and M. S. Swaminathan
- 1977: J.S. Kanwar and Gurdev Khush
- 1976: Chivakula Krishnamoorthy
- 1973: Jitendra P. Srivastava [Dr. J.P. Srivastava] and Dr. Manodutt Pathak
- 1972: Dr. Atmaram Bhairav Joshi

== See also ==
- List of agriculture awards
- List of prizes named after people
