= Nagendra Kumar Singh =

Indian agricultural scientist (born 1958)

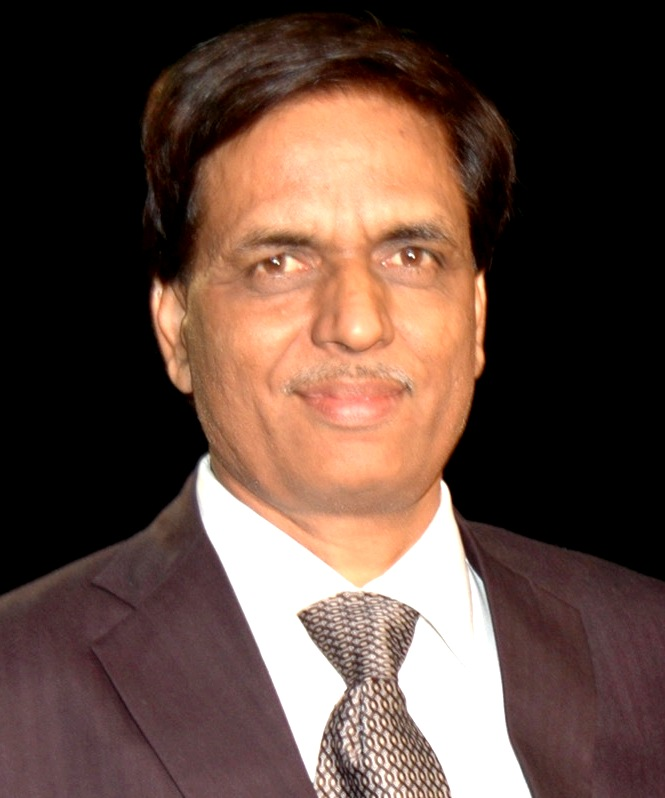
- Nagendra Kumar Singh
- Born: 15 October 1958 (age 67); Mau, Uttar Pradesh
- Education: Banaras Hindu University
- Known for: research in the area of plant biotechnology and genomics
- Awards: Rafi Ahmed Kidwai Award
- Scientific career
- Fields: Agriculture Scientist
- Workplaces: National Research Centre for Plant Biotechnology

Nagendra Kumar Singh (born 15 October 1958) is an Indian agricultural scientist. He is presently a National Professor Dr. B.P. Pal Chair and JC Bose National Fellow at ICAR-National Institute for Plant Biotechnology, Indian Agricultural Research Institute, New Delhi. He was born in a small village Rajapur in the Mau District of Uttar Pradesh, India. He is known for his research in the area of plant genomics, genetics, molecular breeding and biotechnology, particularly for his contribution in the decoding of rice, tomato, wheat, pigeon pea, jute and mango genomes and understanding of wheat seed storage proteins and their effect on wheat quality. He has made significant advances in comparative analysis of rice and wheat genomes and mapping of genes for yield, salt tolerance and basmati quality traits in rice. He is one of the highest cited agricultural scientists from India for the last five years.

He has coordinated several large multi-institutional network projects in the area of plant biotechnology and molecular breeding and has developed more than a dozen climate-resilient varieties of rice tolerant to drought, flooding and salinity for cultivation by the Indian farmers.

== Education and personal life ==
Singh was born on 15 October 1958. His father Late Shri Indrasan Singh was a village-level officer at a Block Development Office in Uttar Pradesh.

He received his early education at the Primary Pathshala in Tilasawa village 1964–68, Junior High School, Jahanaganj 1969–71; matriculation and senior secondary from Wesley Higher Secondary School, Azamgarh, 1971–75; He then did his B.Sc.(Ag.) 1978 and M.Sc. (Ag.) in Genetics and Plant Breeding in 1980 from Institute of Agricultural Sciences, Banaras Hindu University, Varanasi. He was awarded gold medals by BHU for achieving position in the university in both B.Sc. (Ag.) and M.Sc. (Ag.). Immediately after completion of his post graduation from BHU, he moved to Adelaide, Australia on a University of Adelaide Post Graduate Scholarship to pursue his Doctoral Degree which he eventually earned from Waite Agricultural Research Institute, University of Adelaide in 1985, his Ph.D. thesis topic was "Structure and Genetic control of endosperm proteins in wheat and rye". There he was awarded Dr K.P. Barley Prize best post graduate student prize at the university in 1983. He was then awarded the prestigious CSIRO Post Doctoral Award in 1986 and the Queen Elizabeth II Award, by the Australian government in 1988 for his post doctoral research. Though offered a regular position as a research scientist at CSIRO, Sydney, he returned to India to serve the Agricultural Science establishment in India as he was strongly influenced by the Self Reliance (Swadeshi) ideals of Mahatma Gandhi. He works at the Indian Council for Agricultural Research with a motive to make India more self-reliant in area of food security and crop improvement and for the welfare of farmers by playing a leading role in applying the power of Genomics revolution.

== Professional achievements ==
Singh has worked worldwide with researchers to improve various traits of crops like rice, wheat, pigeonpea and tomato. He has been a part of many national and international research projects in the area of plant biotechnology and genomics.

In 2011 Singh led a group of 31 scientists from all over India and sequenced the pigeon pea genome, it was first time that the genome of a legume was sequenced. The effort was a totally indigenous effort by scientists from ICAR, NRCPB, Banaras Hindu University, Indian Institute of Pulse Research, UAS Dharwad and PDKV Akola. The First Draft of pigeon pea genome sequence was published in J. Plant Biochem Biotechnol.

His professional career began in 1981:

- 1981-1988. Research Associate, University of Adelaide: Research on proteins in wheat, discovered a novel class of proteins in wheat seed and named it "Triticin", Triticin is a legume-type storage protein present in the wheat seed in small quantity. It can be manipulated to increase the nutritional quality of wheat
- 1986-1991. Post Doctoral Research fellow, and Queen Elizabeth II National Research Fellow at CSIRO Wheat Research Unit, Sydney and Waite Agricultural Research Institute, Adelaide, respectively. In this period he worked on the Use of sonication and size- exclusion HPLC for separation of wheat gluten proteins
- 1991-1994. Scientist C, CFTRI, Mysore. Developed the Molecular Biology Unit at CFTRI
- 1994-2000. Associate Professor, GBPUAT, Pant Nagar'. worked in areas of transgenic, isogenic and tissue culture filed two patents, introduced Ph.D. programme in Biotechnology during this period
- 2000-2010. Principal scientist, NRCPB, IARI. Built the infrastructure for genomics research and was part of many national and international research projects on rice, tomato and pigeopea. Led the ICAR team of researchers of the International Rice Genome Sequencing project and led the research which got published in the reputed journal Nature. It was after many decades that any research work got published in the Nature Journal from Indian Agricultural Research Institute.
- 2010–present. National Professor, Dr B.P. Pal Chair, IARI, ICAR.

== Awards and recognition ==
- Gold Medalist, B.Sc., Banaras Hindu University, 1978
- Gold Medalist, M.Sc., Banaras Hindu University, 1980
- CSIRO Post-doctoral Award, CSIRO, Australia, 1986
- National Research Fellowship-Queen Elizabeth II Award, Department of Employment, Education and Training, Govt. of Australia, 1988
- Fellow of the Society, Indian Society of Genetics and Plant Breeding, New Delhi, 1998
- National Bioscience Award for Career Development, DBT, Government Of India, New Delhi, 2002
- Member, Scientific Panel of Crop Science Division, ICAR, 2004
- Member, DBT Task Force on Basic Research in Molecular Biology, 2004
- Vice President, Society of Plant Biochemistry and Biotechnology, New Delhi, India, 2006
- Fellow of the academy, National Academy of Agricultural Sciences, New Delhi, India, 2007
- Rafi Ahmed Kidwai Award, ICAR, India, 2007
- Fellow of the academy, Indian National Science Academy, 2011
- Fellow of the academy, National Academy of Sciences, India, 2011
- Secretary, National Academy of Agricultural Science, 2011
- Distinguished Alumni Award, Banaras Hindu University, 2012
- Norman Borlaug Award, ICAR, India, 2015

== Institution building and infrastructure development ==
- Creation of Molecular Biology Unit at CFTRI Mysore in 1992. This lab was created from a grant of Rs. 10 lakhs by the Director CFTRI and is still in functional in the Department of Microbiology at CFTRI. It is used of gene cloning and PCR markers analysis
- Creation of Molecular Markers Lab at GBPUA&T in 1995-96 This lab has been used for conducting post graduate thesis research by numerous students at GBPUAT, Pantanagar. Also at Pantnagar, a Biolistic Genet Transfer lab was created along with transgenic containment glasshouse with power backup for the development of transgenic wheat. This is being used for creating transgenics in different crops.
- Development of following new laboratories under the rice genome project at NRCPB-IARI, New Delhi.
  - 1. Physical Mapping Lab. for BAC DNA fingerprinting, genetic mapping and BAC filter hybridization
  - 2. Cloning Lab, used for shotgun cloning of BAC clones. It has also been used extensively for making several cDNA libraries and microsatellite enriched genomic libraries by scientists from NRCPB and NARS system
  - 3. DNA sequencing Lab. The lab is being used extensively for genome sequencing and EST sequencing of tomato, pigeonpe and M. ciceri
  - 4. Geno-informatics Lab.- A high capacity Sun TCF server, six SUN ultra10 servers, a backup DLT tape library, FOC broadband connectivity and 15 SUN ray thin clients has been established for genome analysis work and is being extensively used.
  - 5. Common Facility Lab. This lab has been created for making MilliQ pure water, autoclaving, shaker, centrifugation, etc. and it is being used extensively by all the labs at the NRCPB, even those outside the rice genome area
  - 6. Functional Genomics Lab. This lab provides general wet lab facility for DNA extraction, PCR, agarose gel electrophoresis and PAGE.
- Creation of Central Micro Array and Proteomics Facility under the ICAR Network Project on Transgenics in Crops: This lab is already operational with the installation of DHPLC system and Affymetrix Microaray system, analysis of micro array chips of maize, rice and Medicago trucatula has been done in this lab.
- For high throughput genotyping Singh has established a Sequenom System for SNP genotyping (First of its kind in any public organization in India) and a Robotics System for plant DNA extraction in 96-well format.
