= Kaleke =

Kaleke Mandi
- City
- Kaleke Mandi
- Location within Pakistan
- Coordinates: 31.21°N 72.46°E
- Country: Pakistan
- Province: Punjab
- District: Hafizabad District

Government
  - Political leader: Rai Qamar kharal
  - Religion leader: Qari Atta ul Mustafa
- Elevation: 187 m (614 ft)

Population (1998)
  - Total: 30k+
  - Estimate: 30,000
- Time zone: UTC+5 (PST)
- Postal code: 52150
- Calling code: 0547
- Languages: Punjabi, Sindhi, Pashto, Urdu, English
- Website: www.kaleke.pk.com

Kaleke Mandi is a town of Hafizabad District in the Punjab province of Pakistan. It is located at 31°21'0N 72°46'0E with an altitude of 187 metres (616 feet).

Kaleke Mandi objects count

Sustenance

Bars	0
Pubs	0
Cafes	0
Fast Food	2
Restaurants	0

Education

Colleges	2
Kindergartens	0
Libraries	0
Schools	15
Universities	0

Transportation

Bus stations	1
Fuel stations	2
Parkings	3

Entertainment, Art&Culture

Art Centres	0
Cinemas	0
Night Clubs	0
Theatres	0

City services

PTCL exchange	1
Police Stations	1
Post Offices	1

Other

Churches	2
Hotels	2
Marketplaces	5
Prisons	0
Shops	150

Financial

ATMs	1
Banks	3
Currency Exchanges	0

health care
Clinics and Hospitals	5
Pharmacies	9
Veterinaries	2
