= Korisapadu =

- Village
- Interactive map of Korisapadu
- Location in Andhra Pradesh, India Korisapadu (India)
- Coordinates: 15°45′24″N 80°02′07″E
- Country: India
- State: Andhra Pradesh
- District: Prakasam
- Mandal: Korisapadu

Languages
  - Official: Telugu
- Time zone: UTC+5:30 (IST)
- PIN: 523212
- Vehicle registration: AP 27

Korisapadu is a village in Korisapadu mandal, Prakasam district of the Indian state of Andhra Pradesh. It is the mandal headquarters of Korisapadu mandal.
