= Indian Institute of Rice Research =

Indian research institute

Coordinates: 17.3203°N 78.3938°E

The Indian Institute of Rice Research (IIRR), formerly the Directorate of Rice Research, is a rice research institute located in Rajendranagar near Hyderabad, Telangana.

The IIRR serves as a major centre for exchange of research material and information. The IIRR mainly coordinates multi-location testing at a national level to identify appropriate varietal and management technologies for all the rice ecosystems. It conducts various strategic and applied research in the major thrust areas of irrigated rice aimed at enhancement of production, productivity, profitability, and preserving environmental quality. It also initiates and coordinates research networks relating to problems of national and regional importance. As of January 2021, The Institute continues its multi-location All India Coordinated Rice Improvement Project with an active partnership between 45 funded cooperating centers affiliated to State Agricultural Universities, State Departments of Agriculture, and other research institutes of the Indian Council of Agricultural Research (ICAR). 90-100 voluntary centers participate in this multi-location testing project.

The rate of technology transfer at IIRR has been accelerated through the use of Information and Communications Technology (ICT). In July 2011, the IIRR launched the Rice Knowledge Management Portal, which serves as an information highway for the rice sector in sharing rice knowledge through the latest ICT tools. Continuous linkages and partnerships are being developed with national, international and private organizations for collaborative research programme. IIRR also offers various consultancy services and undertakes contractual research.

The name of the current director at the IIRR is Dr. Raman Meenakshi Sundaram.

== History ==
The IIRR, formerly All India Coordinated Rice Improvement Project, was established by the Indian Council of Agricultural Research (ICAR) in 1965 with its national headquarters at Hyderabad to organize and coordinate multi-location testing of genetic lines and technologies for crop production and protection generated across the country. The Project was elevated to Directorate of Rice Research in 1983 with an added mandate of research in the thrust areas of irrigated rice. In 2015, IIRR celebrated its 50th year of useful existence for its significant contribution in overall rice production front which has ensured food security for the country.
