= National Initiative on Climate Resilient Agriculture =

Indian research initiative

National Innovations in Climate Resilient Agriculture (NICRA) was launched during February 2011 by the Indian Council of Agricultural Research (ICAR) with the funding from the Ministry of Agriculture, Government of India. The mega project has three major objectives of strategic research, technology demonstrations and capacity building. Assessment of the impact of climate change simultaneous with formulation of adaptive strategies is the prime approach under strategic research across all sectors of agriculture, dairying and fisheries.

Evolving climate resilient agricultural technologies that would increase farm production and productivity vis-à-vis continuous management of natural and manmade resources constitute an integral part of sustaining agriculture in the era of climate change. The four modules of NICRA – natural resource management, improving soil health, crop production and livestock – is aimed making the farmers self-reliant.

== Objectives ==
1. To enhance the resilience of Indian agriculture covering crops, livestock and fisheries to climatic variability and climate change through development and application of improved production and risk management technologies.
2. To demonstrate site specific technology packages on farmers' fields for adapting to current climate risks.
3. To enhance the capacity of scientists and other stakeholders in climate resilient agricultural research and its application.

== Output ==
1. Selection of promising crop genotypes and livestock breeds with greater tolerance to climatic stress.
2. Existing best bet practices for climate resilience demonstrated in 100 vulnerable districts.
3. Infrastructure at key research institutes for climatic change research strengthened.
4. Adequately trained scientific manpower to take up climate change research in the country and empowered farmers to cope with climate variability.

== Components of the Scheme ==
The Scheme will be implemented for the remaining two years (2010–11 and 2011–12) of the XI Plan and likely to continue in the XII Plan with the following four components.

1. Strategic research on adaptation and mitigation.
2. Technology demonstration to cope with current climate variability in 100 vulnerable districts.
3. Capacity building
4. Sponsored competitive research to fill critical gaps

== Key Features ==
1. Critical assessment of different crops/zones in the country for vulnerability to climatic stresses and extreme events, in particular, intra seasonal variability of rainfall
2. Installation of the state-of-the-art equipment like flux towers for measurement of green house gases in large field areas to understand the impact of management practices and contribute data on emissions as national responsibility.
3. Rapid and large scale screening of crop germplasm including wild relatives for drought and heat tolerance through phenomics platforms for quick identification of promising lines and early development and release of heat/drought tolerant varieties.
4. Comprehensive field evaluation of new and emerging approaches of paddy cultivation like aerobic rice and SRI for their contribution to reduce the GHG emissions and water saving.
5. Special attention to livestock and fishery sectors including aquaculture which have not received enough attention in climate change research in the past. In particular, the documentation of adaptive traits in indigenous breeds is the most useful step.
6. Thorough understanding of crop-pest/pathogen relationship and emergence of new biotypes due to climate change.
7. Simultaneous up-scaling of the outputs both through KVKs and the National Mission on Sustainable Agriculture for wider adoption by the farmers
8. Integrated simulation modeling for research, development and policy support

== Strategic Research ==
Adaptation to climate variability and climate change requires long term strategic research in the area of Natural Resource Management, Crops, Pests and disease dynamics, Livestock, Fisheries & Energy Efficiency. Focused programmes are taken up on different commodities on adaptation and mitigation. The strategic research is being carried out involving 21 Institutes of the Indian Council of Agricultural Research out of which seven are core institutes where state of the art research infrastructure and equipments will be installed for climate change research on irrigated crops, rainfed crops, horticulture, livestock, fisheries and energy efficiency. ICAR Research Complex-NEH at Shillong is addressing all issues related to North-East.

The seven Core institutes are

1. Central Research Institute for Dryland Agriculture (CRIDA), Hyderabad
2. Indian Agricultural Research Institute (IARI), New Delhi
3. Indian Institute of Horticultural Research (IIHR), Bangalore
4. National Dairy Research Institute (NDRI), Karnal
5. Central Marine Fisheries Research Institute (CMFRI), Cochin
6. Central Institute of Agricultural Engineering (CIAE), Bhopal
7. ICAR-Research Complex for NEH Region, Umïam, Shillong

Institutes identified for thematic research across crops and agro-climatic zones are;

1. Indian Veterinary Research Institute (IVRI), Izatnagar
2. Central Inland Fisheries Research Institute (CIFRI), Barrackpore
3. Central Institute for Brackish Water Aquaculture (CIBA), Chennai
4. National Institute for Abiotic Stress Management (NIASM), Baramati, Pune
5. Central Rice Research Institute (CRRI), Cuttack
6. Directorate of Rice Research (DRR), Hyderabad
7. Indian Institute of Pulses Research (IIPR), Kanpur
8. Indian Institute of Vegetable Research (IIVR), Varanasi
9. ICAR Research Complex for Eastern Region, Ranchi
10. National Institute of Plant Biotechnology, New Delhi
11. National Centre for Integrated Pest Management (NCIPM), New Delhi
12. National Research Centre for Agro Forestry (NRCAF), Jhansi
13. Directorate of Water Management, Bhubhaneshwar
14. Indian Institute of Farming System Research (PDFSR), Modipuram

== Technology Demonstration ==
The technology demonstration component consists of the following partners:

1. KVKs in eight zones -100
2. Co-operating centres of AICRP on Dryland Agriculture - 25
3. Technology Transfer Divisions of Core Institutes – 7

Under this component, an integrated package of proven technologies would be demonstrated in one village panchayat in each district for adaptation and mitigation of the crop and livestock production systems to climate variability based on the available technologies.

The process of finalizing demonstration consists of the following steps:

1. Analysis of climatic constraints of village based on long term data
2. Assessment of the natural resources status of the village
3. Identification of major production systems
4. Studying of existing institutional structures and identify gaps Focus group discussion with the community to finalize the interventions

The interventions cover the following four modules:

Module I : Natural resources

This module consists of interventions related to in-situ moisture conservation, water harvesting and recycling for supplemental irrigation, improved drainage in flood prone areas, conservation tillage where appropriate, artificial ground water recharge and water saving irrigation methods.

Module II : Crop Production

This module consists of introducing drought/temperature tolerant varieties, advancement of planting dates of rabi crops in areas with terminal heat stress, water saving paddy cultivation methods (SRI, aerobic, direct seeding), frost management in horticulture through fumigation, community nurseries for delayed monsoon, custom hiring centres for timely planting, location specific intercropping systems with high sustainable yield index.

Module III : Livestock and Fisheries

Use of community lands for fodder production during droughts/floods, improved fodder/feed storage methods, preventive vaccination, improved shelters for reducing heat stress in livestock, management of fish ponds/tanks during water scarcity and excess water, etc.

Module IV : Institutional Interventions

This module consist of institutional interventions either by strengthening the existing ones or initiating new ones relating to seed bank, fodder bank, commodity groups, custom hiring centre, collective marketing, introduction of weather index based insurance and climate literacy through a village level weather station.

The Process

The KVK team for each district carried out a detailed exercise on the needs of the village, the climatic vulnerability (drought/floods/heat wave/frost/cyclone) and the available technology options from the concerned Zonal Agricultural Research Stations of the SAU. After a careful study of the gaps, specific interventions from each of the modules were to be selected and an integrated package from all modules was formulated. Majority farmers are to be covered with one or more of the interventions in order to demonstrate a discernible effect. As an outcome of this exercise location specific climate resilient practices and constraints in its adoption would be documented.

Zone wise profile of selected districts and its climatic vulnerabilities

== See also ==
- Indian Council of Agricultural Research
- Indian missions
- Van Vigyan Kendra (VVK) Forest Science Centres
