= International Crops Research Institute for the Semi-Arid Tropics =

International research organization

ICRISAT
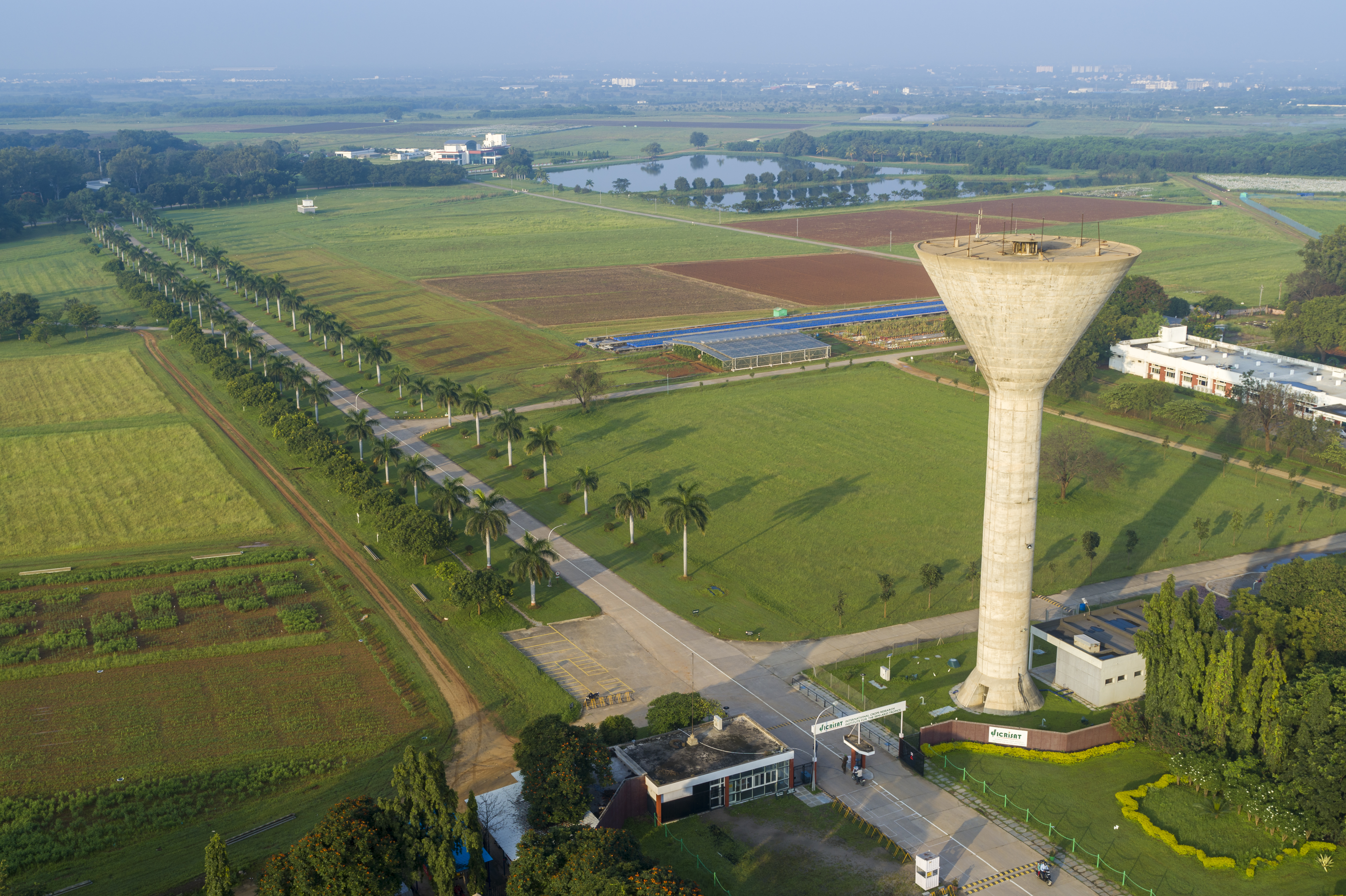
- Formation: 1972
- Type: Intergovernmental Organization
- Location: Patancheru, Hyderabad, Telangana, India
- Services: Research and development
- Key people: Dr Himanshu Pathak, Cathy Reade, Stanford Blade, Rebbie Harawa, Victor Afari-Sefa, Sanjay Agarwal
- Parent organisation: CGIAR
- Website: www.icrisat.org

The International Crops Research Institute for the Semi-Arid Tropics (ICRISAT) is an international organisation which conducts agricultural research for rural development, headquartered in Patancheru, Hyderabad, Telangana, India, with several regional centres (Bamako (Mali), Nairobi (Kenya)) and research stations (Niamey (Niger), Kano (Nigeria), Lilongwe (Malawi), Addis Ababa (Ethiopia), Bulawayo (Zimbabwe)). It was founded in 1972 by a consortium of organisations convened by the Ford- and the Rockefeller- foundations. Its charter was signed by the FAO and the UNDP.

Since its inception, host country India has granted a special status to ICRISAT as a UN Organization operating in the Indian territory making it eligible for special immunities and tax privileges.

ICRISAT is managed by a full-time Director General functioning under the overall guidance of an international Governing Board. The current Director General, Dr Himanshu Pathak, who took the post on 06 March 2025. The current chairman of the Board is Cathy Reade

== The semi-arid tropics ==
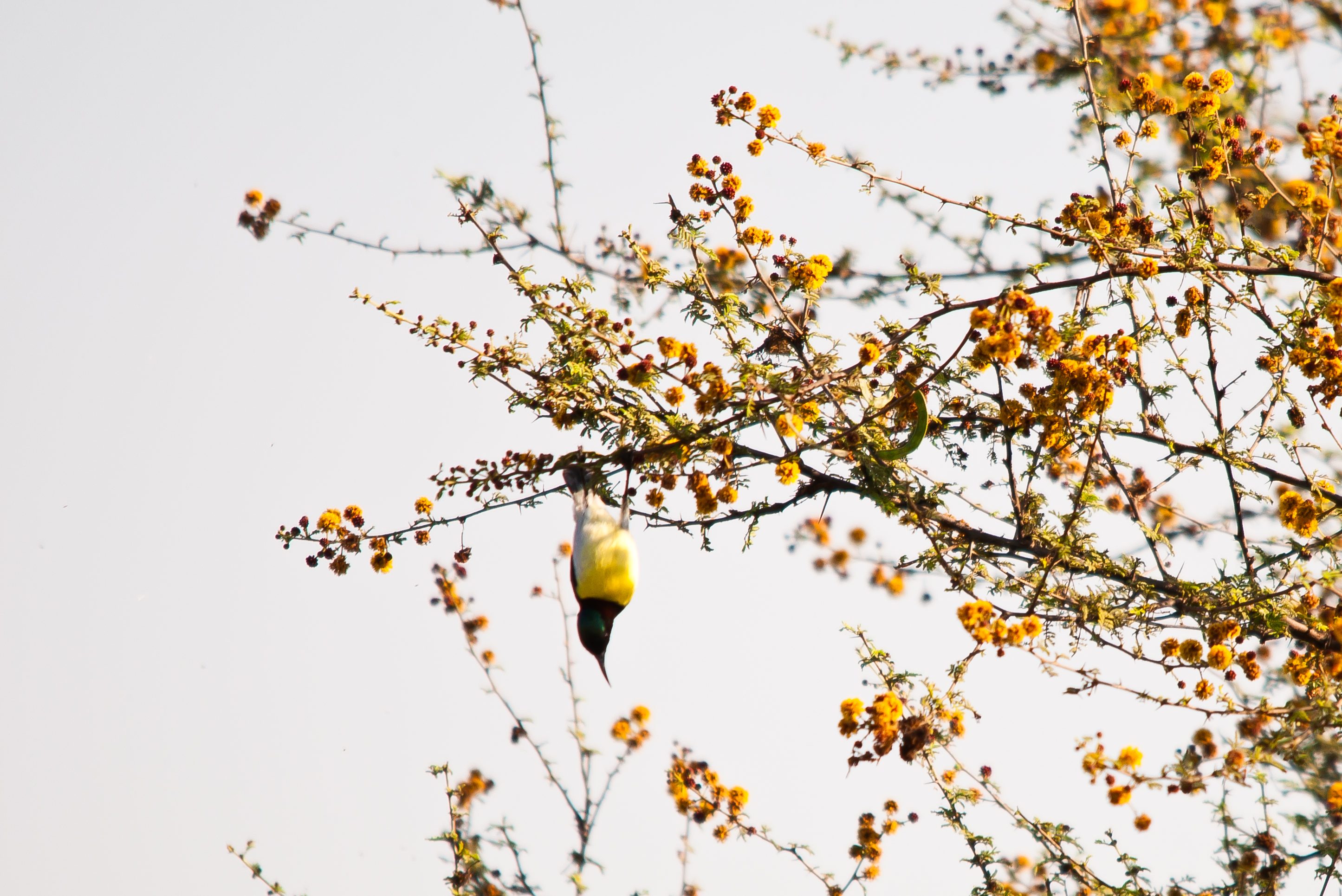
Purple-rumped sunbird in the ICRISAT fields

The semi-arid tropics (SAT) region is characterized by highly variable, low-to-medium rainfall and poor soils, further characterized by lack of irrigation. In general, the historical average annual rainfall in the SAT is below 700 millimetres (28 in). In agricultural policy terms, this region is considered to be a less favored area (LFA).

== Research strategy ==
In the complex farming systems of the drylands integrated solutions are needed to address the challenges of poverty, climate change, nutrition and sustainability of natural resources.

ICRISAT works through diverse partnerships across Asia and Africa and focuses on addressing the agricultural constraints in the drylands in alignment with its mission and mandate. ICRISAT conducts upstream science and translates it to applied research. This seeks to scale scientific innovations with due attention to the environment, policy, marketing and socioeconomics.

ICRISAT founded the Smart Food initiative in 2013 with the vision to "create a world where food is smart – good for you, the planet and the farmer". A key objective is to diversify staples across Africa and Asia, with the initial focus on millets and sorghum.

== Mandate crops ==
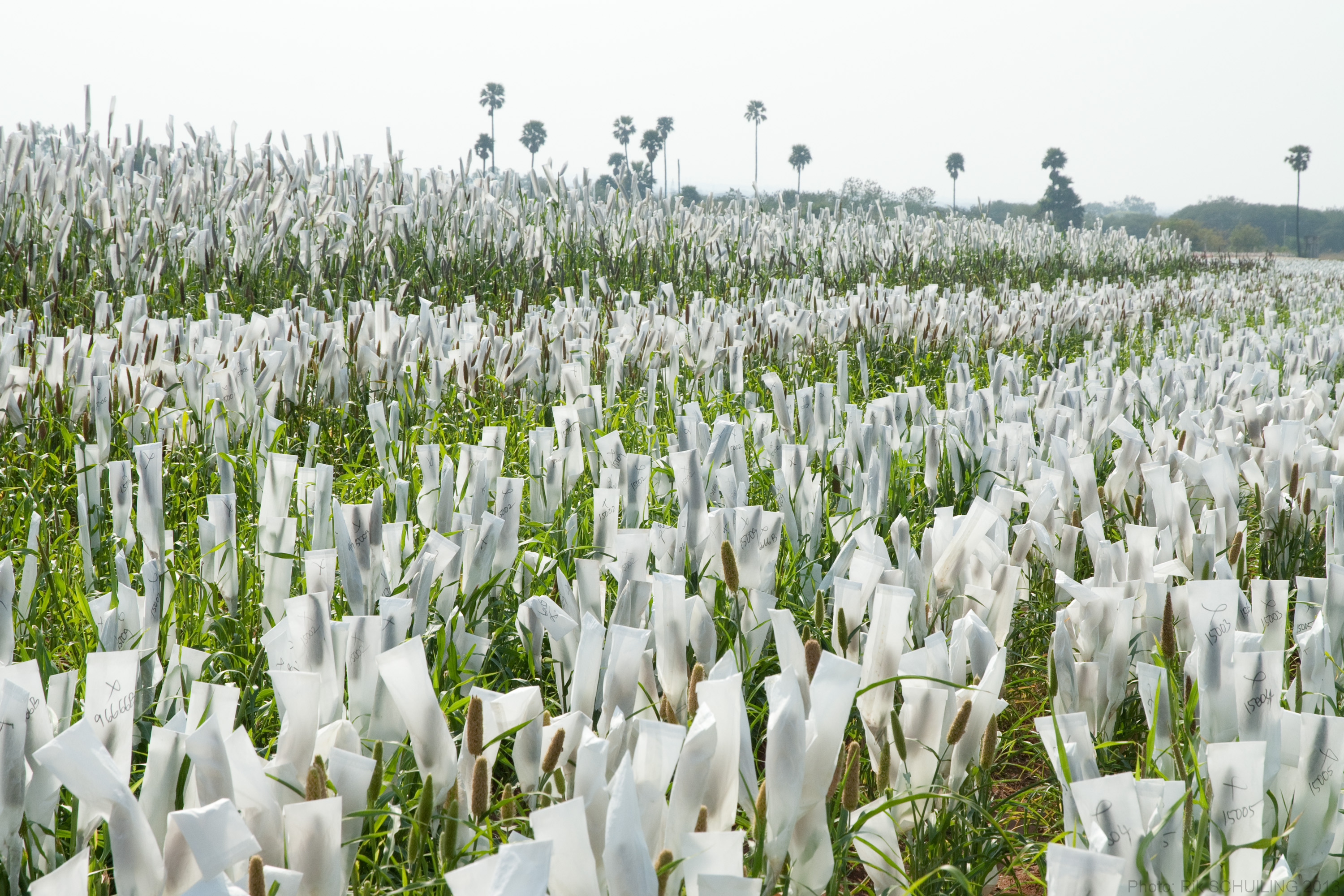
Pearl millet seed production plots at ICRISAT (Patancheru, India), the panicles covered in parchment paper bags to ensure self-pollination in this normally mainly cross-pollinating crop (February 2013)

ICRISAT performs crop improvement research, using conventional as well as methods derived from biotechnology, on the following crops: chickpea, pigeonpea, groundnut, pearl millet, sorghum, finger millet, teff, and small millets.

ICRISAT's scientific information by topic, crop, location and resources is found on Exploreit.

== Research themes and genebank ==
ICRISAT conducts its research under three Global Research Programs (GRPs): Accelerated Crop Improvement, Resilient Farm and Food Systems, Enabling Systems Transformations. These three GRPs are implemented through 18 research clusters.

The ICRISAT genebank serves as a repository for the collection of germplasm of the six mandate crops – sorghum, pearl millet, finger millet, chickpea, pigeonpea and groundnut; and five small millets – foxtail millet, little millet, kodo millet, proso millet and barnyard millet. The collection has over 128,446 germplasm accessions assembled from 144 countries. Several landraces now conserved in the ICRISAT genebank have disappeared from their natural habitats in Africa and Asia.

== Accelerated crop improvement research ==
Most of ICRISAT's crop improvement research is directed to deliver climate-resilient improved crop varieties with pest and disease resistance, improved nutritional quality and market preferred traits and improved genetic gains.

Based on an econometric analysis of time-series data for three different types of agricultural areas (irrigated, high-potential rainfed, and low-potential rainfed), non-ICRISAT experts found more favorable marginal returns (measured as Indian rupees of agricultural production per additional hectare planted to modern varieties) for crop improvement research in low-potential rainfed areas than in either high-potential rainfed areas or irrigated areas. Moreover, additional crop research investment in low potential rainfed areas lifts more people out of poverty than in the other two types of areas.

ICRISAT-improved chickpea varieties have been widely adopted in a poor tribal area in Gujarat, India, with favorable impacts on yields, unit production costs, and net returns per hectare/per acre. ICRISAT's package of improved groundnut varieties grown in combination with improved agronomy practices has had a positive result in the semi-arid tropical areas of Central India.

Two major science-based breakthroughs attributed to crop improvement research at ICRISAT relate to pearl millet and pigeonpea. A team of researchers at ICRISAT have released the first public sector-bred, marker-assisted bred hybrid pearl millet, HHB 67. This was released in India in 2006. It is assessed to have superior agronomic performance and improved tolerance to terminal drought. The first-ever release of a hybrid pigeonpea by ICRISAT researchers has been reported in 2008.

== Information products and services ==
ICRISAT formally adopted an open-access policy for its research publications in 2009. It is among a small number of agricultural research organisations to do so. As of June 2010, about 3000 publications are available on the organisation's website.

== See also ==
- Arid Forest Research Institute
- CGIAR
- Genome Valley
