= National Academy of Agricultural Sciences =

Government agency in Delhi, India

- Established: 1990
- Officer in charge: President, NAAS,
- President: Dr. Himanshu Pathak
- Location: Pusa, New Delhi, Delhi, India; 28.080°N 77.120°E
- Campus: NASC Complex
- Nickname: NAAS
- Website: Official Web Site

The National Academy of Agricultural Sciences (NAAS) is a Government of India funded agency, established in 1990, is a research platform in the fields of crop husbandry, animal husbandry, fisheries and agro-forestry. It acts as a research base for agro-scientists to formulate their advice to the policy makers in discussion with the agricultural and agro industrial communities. The Academy is located at the National Agricultural Science Centre Complex, Pusa, in New Delhi, India.

== Profile ==
Mission
To gain recognition as a credible think tank to provide views of the scientific community on all agriculture- related policy issues, to encourage talent and promote excellence in science, making it a powerful instrument for the growth of national economy with a vibrant farm sector.

Objectives
- promote ecologically sustainable agriculture,
- recognize and promote excellence of individual scientists in the field of agriculture,
- promote interaction among research workers in different institutions and organizations within the country and with the world scientific community,
- publish specific studies including those intended for policy-makers for the advancement of agricultural research and development, and
- carry out such activities as are relevant to the accomplishment of the above goals.

The National Academy of Agricultural Sciences (NAAS) owes it origin to the vision of the late Dr. B. P. Pal, noted Indian agricultural scientist, who first put forth the idea of setting up a back-end chat room for assisting the decision makers on policies aimed at the development of agriculture in India. Tailing his advice, the Academy was formed in 1990 to assist research in agricultural and related sciences, to provide a forum for agricultural scientists for deliberations, and to organize seminars, congresses and conferences for the propagation of the philosophy of agriculture, which it has been carrying out since inception. It also maintains a Corporate Membership scheme for the corporate sector.

== Projects ==
The Academy undertakes several projects, planned in advance, every year. The major projects selected for research for the year 2014 are:

- Climate Resilient Livestock Production
- Breaking low-productivity syndrome of soybean in India
- Reservoir Fisheries Development in India: Policy and Management Options
- Practical and affordable approaches in implement precision
- Carbon Economy in Indian Agriculture
- Hydroponic Fodder Production in India
- Together with Farm Industry
- Livestock Breeding Policy in India
- Monitoring and Evaluation on AREE4D
- Linking Farmers with Market

== Regional chapters ==
NAAS spreads its activities across the country through twelve regional chapters, located at various agriculturally important places in India. The regional offices are mandated to create public awareness through lectures, seminars, conferences and workshops, publish magazines, journals and other print media methods and prepare databases of agricultural scientists region wise and generate interest among aspiring scientists. The regional offices are located at Barapani, Bengaluru, Bhopal, Coimbatore, Cuttack, Hyderabad, Karnal, Kolkata, Lucknow, Ludhiana, Pune and Varanasi.

== Awards ==
NAAS encourages research in Agricultural, environmental and nutrition Sciences, by way of awards and medals bi-annually.

- Memorial Awards
- Recognition Awards
- Young Scientists Awards
- Endowment Awards

Further, the Academy has put in place five research fellowships of three-year tenure, NAAS –TATA Young Scientists’ Research Fellowship, aimed at supporting young scientists working in various research centres, State agricultural universities and other Indian Council of Agricultural Research organizations. The fellowships are funded by Sir Dorabji Tata Trust.

== Journal scoring ==
The academy for assessing the quality of the published work of the fellow nominees had developed a 'Score' with which it rates various journals. It has two categories with two different criteria. For the journals which has the Thomson Reuters' Impact Factor (Journal Citation Reports) it assigns a score of 6.00 plus the journal’s Impact Factor with capping on 20.00. And for others which does have any Impact Factor, it uses various measures like frequency of publication, editorial board constitution, article contributions from overseas, citation analysis of articles etc.

== Publications ==
NAAS has published several books, journals and reports, of which some of the notable ones are:

- Felicitation Volume on Occasion of Dr. M. S. Swaminathan’s 70th Birthday.
- Uncommon Opportunities for Achieving Sustainable Food and Nutrition Security. An Agenda for Science and Public policy
- Invited and Contributed Papers (Two volumes) of Third Agricultural Science Congress held at PAU Ludhiana
- Action Plan on Conservation, Management and Use of Agro-Biodiversity
- Converting Deserts into Oasis.
- State of Indian Agriculture.
- Revival of the Agricultural Crescent of Bihar – a Study Report.
- Degraded and Wastelands of India – Status and Spatial Distribution
- Conservation Agriculture – Innovations for Improving Efficiency, Equity and Environment – Selected Papers of 4th World Congress on Conservation Agriculture
- State of Indian Agriculture – Indo-Gangetic Plains.
- Proceedings of the X Agricultural Science Congress on the theme Soil, Plant and Animal Health for Enhanced and Sustained Agricultural Productivity

In addition, the Institute has been publishing NAS Year Book since 1994, NAAS News, a quarterly journal, Agricultural News, a journal based on agricultural news on dailies, Policy Papers and Year Planners.

== See also ==
- Indian Council of Agricultural Research
- Indian Agricultural Research Institute
