= Indian Council of Agricultural Research =

Apex body in New Delhi, India

- Former name: Imperial Council of Agricultural Research
- Motto in English: Agrisearch with a human touch
- Type: Registered society
- Established: 16 July 1929; 97 years ago
- Budget: ₹7,800 crore (US$810 million) (2018–2019)
- President: Union Minister of Agriculture and Farmers' Welfare
- Director: Mangi Lal Jat
- Students: 28000 (both Undergraduate & Postgraduate)
- Location: New Delhi, India
- Campus: Urban
- Website: icar.org.in

The Indian Council of Agricultural Research (ICAR) is an autonomous body responsible for co-ordinating agricultural education and research in India. It reports to the Department of Agricultural Research and Education, Ministry of Agriculture. The Union Minister of Agriculture serves as its president. It is the largest network of agricultural research and education institutes in the world.

The committee to Advise on Renovation and Rejuvenation of Higher Education (Yashpal Committee, 2009) has recommended setting up of a constitutional body – the National Commission for Higher Education and Research – which would be a unified supreme body to regulate all branches of higher education including agricultural education. Presently, regulation of agricultural education is the mandate of ICAR, Veterinary Council of India (Veterinary sub-discipline) and Indian Council of Forestry Research and Education (Forestry sub-discipline). A number of natural resource management institutes of India also come under the ICAR.

== Milestones ==
- 2006: ICAR represented in the First Governing Body of the FAO Seed Treaty (ITPGRFA) in Madrid, Spain.
- 2006: ICAR developed a vaccine against bird flu. The vaccine was developed at the High Security Animal Disease Laboratory, Bhopal, the only facility in the country to conduct tests for the H5N1 variant of bird flu. It was entrusted with the task of developing a vaccine by the ICAR after the Avian Influenza outbreak in February.
- 2007: Launch of US–India Agricultural Knowledge Initiative.
- 2008: India-Brazil-South Africa Joint Working Group on Agriculture Initiated.
- 2009: In December 2009, it announced that it was considering a policy to provide open access to its research.
- 2009: New and restructured postgraduate curricula and syllabi introduced.
- 2010: In March 2010, ICAR made its two flagship journals (Indian Journal of Agricultural Sciences and Indian Journal of Animal Sciences) as open access journals.
- 2011: ICAR scientists were the first in the world to sequence the pigeonpea genome. It was an indigenous effort by 31 scientists led by Nagendra Kumar Singh of NRCPB. The first draft of the sequence was published in J. Plant Biochem. Biotechnol.
- 2013: On 13 September 2013, it announced the Open Access Policy and committed for making all the public funded scholarly research outputs openly available via open access repositories.
- 2019: ICAR has also published an Integrated Mobile App called KISAAN (Krishi Integrated Solution for Agri Apps Navigation) for Farmers of country Mobile App has interface in 12 Indian Languages.
- 2024: ICAR launched its 'One Scientist-One Product' program on July 16 to enhance research in agriculture and animal husbandry.

== Accreditation ==
ICAR provides accreditation to agriculture universities, colleges and programmes, through its accreditation unit, National Agricultural Education Accreditation Board (NAEAB). The board was established in 1996 and given its current name in 2017. The accreditation serves only as a badge of quality assurance. It is not mandatory, is not a form of affiliation or recognition and does not give approval to open an institute or a program. As of 1 April 2021, NAEAB lists only 39 accredited institutes. Henceforth the Tamil Nadu Agricultural University was the first State University to get accredited by ICAR.

While ICAR accreditation is voluntary, since 2016–17 it is linked with the release of grants for education quality assurance for State Agricultural Universities. It is also used by some institutes as an affiliation or admission requirements. In September 2021, Goa University has reinstated affiliation to a college, after previously cancelling the affiliation because the college was not accredited by NAEAB. In 2022, students were not accepted to master's degree at Rajiv Gandhi University because their B.Sc. in agriculture degree was from an unaccredited private university.

== Institutions ==
As of January 2020, ICAR has following institutions:

- 4 Deemed Universities
- 65 ICAR Institutions
- 15 National Research Centres
- 6 National Bureaux
- 13 Directorates/Project Directorates
- 11 Agricultural Technology Application Research Institute (ATARI)

== Headquarters ==
Indian Council of Agricultural Research's headquarters is in New Delhi.

== Examination system ==
All India Entrance Exam for Agriculture (CUET) conducted by National Testing Agency (NTA) is an entrance exam for admission into the agricultural universities recognized by ICAR.

== Number of applicants by year ==
Exam	AIEEA (UG)		AIEEA (PG)		AICE(JRF/SRF)		
Year	Registered Applicants	Appeared Applicants	Registered Applicants	Appeared Applicants	Registered Applicants	Appeared Applicants	Reference(s)
2019	236,931		31,486		8,374		
2020	197,837	139,365	28,830	19,946	14,080	9,518	
2021	144,848	122,993	22,912	20,811	10,046	8,919	
2022	89,413	61,051	20,650	18,332	13,096	11,001	

== Agricultural Research Service ==
The Agricultural Scientists Recruitment Board (ASRB) conducts all India competitive examination Agricultural Research Service (ARS), to recruit posts in the ARS of Indian Council of Agricultural Research.

== Awards ==
ICAR presents the following awards:

- Choudhary Devi Lal Outstanding All-India Coordinated Research Project Award
- Rafi Ahmed Kidwai Award
- Fakhruddin Ali Ahmed Award for Tribal Areas
- Hari Om Ashram Trust Award
- Jawaharlal Nehru Award for outstanding doctoral thesis research
- Vasantrao Naik Award
- Lal Bahadur Shastri Young Scientist Award
- Bharat Ratna Dr C Subramaniam Outstanding Teacher Award
- Punjab Rao Deshmukh Woman Agricultural Scientist Award
- Chaudhary Charan Singh Award for Excellence in Journalism in Agricultural Research and Development
- N.G. Ranga Farmer Award for Diversified Agriculture
- Jagjivan Ram Kisan Puruskar
- Swamy Sahajanand Saraswati Extension Scientist/ Worker Award
- ICAR Award for Outstanding Multidisciplinary Team Research in Agriculture and Allied Sciences
- National Krishi Vigyan Kendra Award
- Dr Rajendra Prasad Puruskar for Technical Books in Hindi in The Field of Agriculture and Allied Sciences
- Udyan Pandit Award for excellence in fruit growing

== See also ==
- List of agricultural universities in India
- National Bureau of Fish Genetic Resources
- National Initiative on Climate Resilient Agriculture
- Van Vigyan Kendra
