= Punyavrat Suvimalendu Pandey =

Indian agricultural scientist

- Born: 1964 (age 61–62); Bihar, India
- Education: Patna Science College; Indian Agricultural Research Institute
- Known for: Agricultural Scientist, Statistics, Agricultural Education, Policy and Administration
- Scientific career
- Fields: Agricultural Science; Statistics; Agricultural Education; Agricultural Management
- Workplaces: Dr. Rajendra Prasad Central Agriculture University; Indian Council of Agricultural Research; National Academy of Agricultural Research Management; National Academy of Agricultural Research Management

Punyavrat Suvimalendu Pandey (born 1964, Bihar), is an Indian academic, agricultural scientist and vice-chancellor of Dr. Rajendra Prasad Central Agriculture University, Samastipur.

Pandey is an expert in the field of agricultural ICT. He created policies for agriculture education capacity development such as equity, access promotion, relevance, quality, and capacity building.

== Early life and education ==
Punyavrat Suvimalendu Pandey was born on 13 February 1964 in a small village, Rahathua of Buxar, Bihar. He did his graduation from Patna Science College and M.Sc. & Ph.D. from the Indian Agricultural Research Institute (ICAR), Delhi.

== Academic career ==
Pandey started his career as a scientist with National Academy of Agricultural Research Management, Hyderabad. He is a member of the Agricultural Research Service (ARS) 1986 batch and has worked as a scientist and research manager for ICAR in a variety of capacities, from Scientist at the National Academy of Agricultural Research Management Hyderabad, to National Coordinator of the Organisation and Management Component of the National Agricultural Innovation Project (NAIP) at ICAR, Delhi.

Pandey has also served as Assistant Director General (Education Planning & Home Science; and Education Quality Assurance and Reforms) at Indian Council of Agricultural Research, New Delhi.

In September 2022, Pandey joined as Vice Chancellor of Dr. Rajendra Prasad Central Agriculture University, Samastipur, Bihar.

In January 2024, Pandey approved a new technology of mushroom ‘Badi’ production developed by the university. He also provided certificates to the women who completed their drone pilot training.

== Notable publications ==
Pandey has over 120 research papers and articles published in national and international magazines. He has served as a reviewer for multiple publications and as a member of the editorial boards of several scientific journals.

- "Yield trends, and changes in soil organic-C and available NPK in a long-term rice–wheat system under integrated use of manures and fertilizers"; 2000; RL Yadav, BS Dwivedi, Kamta Prasad, OK Tomar, NJ Shurpali, PS Pandey; Cited by 377
- "Rice-wheat cropping system: assessment of sustainability under green manuring and chemical fertilizer inputs"; 2000; RL Yadav, BS Dwivedi, PS Pandey; Cited by 307
- "Calibrating the Leaf Color Chart for Nitrogen Management in Different Genotypes of Rice and Wheat in a System"; 2004; AK Shukla, JK Ladha, VK Singh, BS Dwivedi, V. Balasubramanian, RK Gupta, SK Sharma, Y. Singh, H. Pathak, PS Pandey, AT Padre, RL Yadav; Cited by 266
