= Bloxham (disambiguation) =

Bloxham is a village in Oxfordshire on the edge of the Cotswolds in the central part of England.

Bloxham may also refer to:

- Bloxham (surname)
- Bloxham, Florida, an unincorporated community, United States
- Bloxham County, Florida, United States, a proposed county
- HMS Bloxham, a Hunt-class minesweeper
- Bloxham Stockbrokers, an Irish stockbroking firm

== See also ==
- Bloxham School
- Bloxam
