= Prem Lal Gautam =

Indian academic (born 1947)

Dr Prem Lal Gautam
- Born: 12 December 1947 (age 78); Bilaspur, Himachal Pradesh, India
- Citizenship: Indian
- Education: M.Sc. and Ph.D. in Genetics, Indian Agricultural Research Institute, New Delhi.
- Occupations: Academic, Professor
- Years active: 2023–present, Chancellor, Dr. Rajendra Prasad Central Agriculture University
- Title: Chancellor, Dr. Rajendra Prasad Central Agriculture University
- Scientific career
- Fields: Geneticist, Plant breeder

Prem Lal Gautam is an Indian academician, agricultural scientist, currently the chancellor of Dr. Rajendra Prasad Central Agriculture University, Pusa, Bihar, India.

== Life and career ==
He was born in Bilaspur, Himachal Pradesh, India on 12 December 1947. He is an agricultural graduate from Agricultural College Solan, Himachal Pradesh, completed his M.Sc. and Ph.D. in Genetics from Indian Agricultural Research Institute, New Delhi.

He is a former Vice Chancellor G. B. Pant University of Agriculture and Technology, former Vice Chancellor Career Point University, former chairperson of the Protection of Plant Varieties and Farmers’ Rights Authority, the Ministry of Agriculture in India, Vice-Chair of 5th Governing Body of the International Treaty, and former director of National Bureau of Plant Genetic Resources, Indian Council of Agricultural Research (ICAR) Ministry of Agriculture.

He is a fellow of National Academy of Agricultural Sciences, National Academy of Biological Sciences, National Academy of Horticultural Sciences, Indian Society of Genetics and Plant Breeding, and the Indian Society of Plant Genetic Resources.

He is known to have improved varieties of bread wheat, soybean, ricebean, foxtail millet and buckwheat. He has also contributed to augmentation of plant germplasm in the national gene bank including mounting of special explorations.

He received honoris causa Doctorate of Science degree by SKUAST-J and ANDUaT Faizabad (UP) for his noteworthy contributions as an institution builder and researcher.

== Awards and recognitions ==
He has received various awards. Some of the awards are as follows:

- Pamda Shri
- Dr. Harbhajan Singh Memorial Award
- Lal Bahadur Shastri Memorial Award
- Indira Gandhi Priyadarshni Award; and other awards
