= William McRae (disambiguation) =

William McRae (1909–1973) was an American judge.

William McRae may also refer to:

- William McRae (botanist) (1878–1952), Scottish botanist
- William McRae (cricketer) (1904–1973), Australian cricketer
- William Plummer McRae (1863/1864 – 1901), American politician

== See also ==
- Willie McRae (1923–1985), Scottish lawyer and campaigner
- William MacRae (1834–1882), Confederate States Army general
- William McCrea (disambiguation)
