= Govindachetty Rangaswami =

Indian agricultural scientist (1925 –2005)

Director, National Academy of Agricultural Research Management
- In office 1 April 1978 – 4 October 1979
- Preceded by: N. K. Anantha Rao
- Succeeded by: M. Rajagopalan

Vice-Chancellor, Tamil Nadu Agricultural University
- In office 1 June 1971 – 29 August 1978
- Preceded by: Office established
- Succeeded by: A. Venkataraman

Dean, University of Agricultural Sciences, Bengaluru
- In office 1965–1971

Personal details
- Born: 10 May 1925 Kuttapatty village, Madras Presidency, British India
- Died: 7 September 2005 (aged 80) Coimbatore, Tamil Nadu, India
- Education: Agricultural College, Coimbatore; Indian Agricultural Research Institute; Rutgers State University
- Scientific career
- Notable work: Bacterial Plant Diseases in India (1962); Pythiaceous Fungi (1962); Diseases of Crop Plants in India (1972); Agricultural Microbiology (2004)
- Fields: Agricultural microbiology; Plant pathology; Sericulture
- Workplaces: Annamalai University; TNAU; NAARM
- Doctoral advisor: Selman A. Waksman

Govindachetty Rangaswami (10 May 1925 – 7 September 2005), commonly referred to as G. Rangaswami, was an Indian agricultural scientist and administrator known for his contributions to agricultural microbiology, plant pathology, and sericulture. He served as the Vice-Chancellor of Tamil Nadu Agricultural University from 1971 to 1978 and played a pivotal role in advancing agricultural education and research in India.

== Early life and education ==
Rangaswami was born on 10 May 1925 in Kuttapatty village, Madras Presidency. He graduated from the Agricultural College, Coimbatore, in 1946 with distinction in Agricultural Botany and Plant Pathology. His academic excellence earned him two medals for first rank in his class. He continued his academic journey at the Indian Agricultural Research Institute, New Delhi, where he undertook an Associateship from 1951 to 1953. During this period, he researched plant pathogens and soil microbiology under the mentorship of Dr. R. S. Vasudeva. In 1956, he earned a Ph.D. from Rutgers State University, New Jersey, under the mentorship of Nobel Laureate Selman A. Waksman.

== Career ==
After returning to India in 1956, Rangaswami joined the Mycology Section of the Agricultural College, Coimbatore, where he continued his research in soil microbiology.

In 1958, he joined Annamalai University, Chidambaram, as the Head of the Department of Agriculture. There, he founded the Department of Agricultural Microbiology, the first in India to offer postgraduate and doctoral programs in the field. His research focused on plant pathogen survival in soil and microbial environments in the spermosphere, phyllosphere, and rhizosphere.

In 1965, Rangaswami became the Dean of the University of Agricultural Sciences, Bangalore. From 1971 to 1978, he served as the first Vice-Chancellor of Tamil Nadu Agricultural University. During his tenure, he expanded academic initiatives and integrated plant pathology and microbiology into broader agricultural studies.

From 1978 to 1979, Rangaswami served as Director of the National Academy of Agricultural Research Management, Hyderabad. He later served as Advisor to the Agriculture of the Planning Commission (1980), and Commonwealth Technical Advisor (Agriculture) in the United Kingdom (1981).

Rangaswami also contributed significantly to the sericulture industry, authoring foundational books in collaboration with the Central Sericulture Research and Training Institute, Mysore. He served as Chairman of the All India Sericulture Research Coordination Committee of the Central Silk Board for two terms (1973–1980).

== Publications ==
Rangaswami was a leading authority on plant pathology and soil microbiology. He published over 400 scientific papers and 11 books during his career. His notable works include Bacterial Plant Diseases in India (1962), Pythiaceous Fungi (1962), and Diseases of Crop Plants in India (1972), which became essential texts in plant pathology.

His research on microbial environments and the survival of plant pathogens in soil laid the foundation for the identification of several major plant pathogens in India. His textbooks, particularly Agricultural Microbiology (2004), became foundational references for students and researchers in this field.

== Recognitions ==
He was named International Man of the Year by the USA Academy in 1995. He was elected a Fellow of the Indian Academy of Sciences in 1960 and a Fellow of the National Academy of Sericultural Sciences, India, for 2003–2004. He also received honorary doctorates from institutions such as the University of Agricultural Sciences, Bangalore; Tamil Nadu Agricultural University; and Pondicherry University. Additionally, he served as President of the Indian Phytopathological Society and the Association of Microbiologists of India.

== Death ==
Rangaswami died on 7 September 2005, in a car crash.
