= James MacKenna =

Scottish-Indian civil servant and agriculturalist

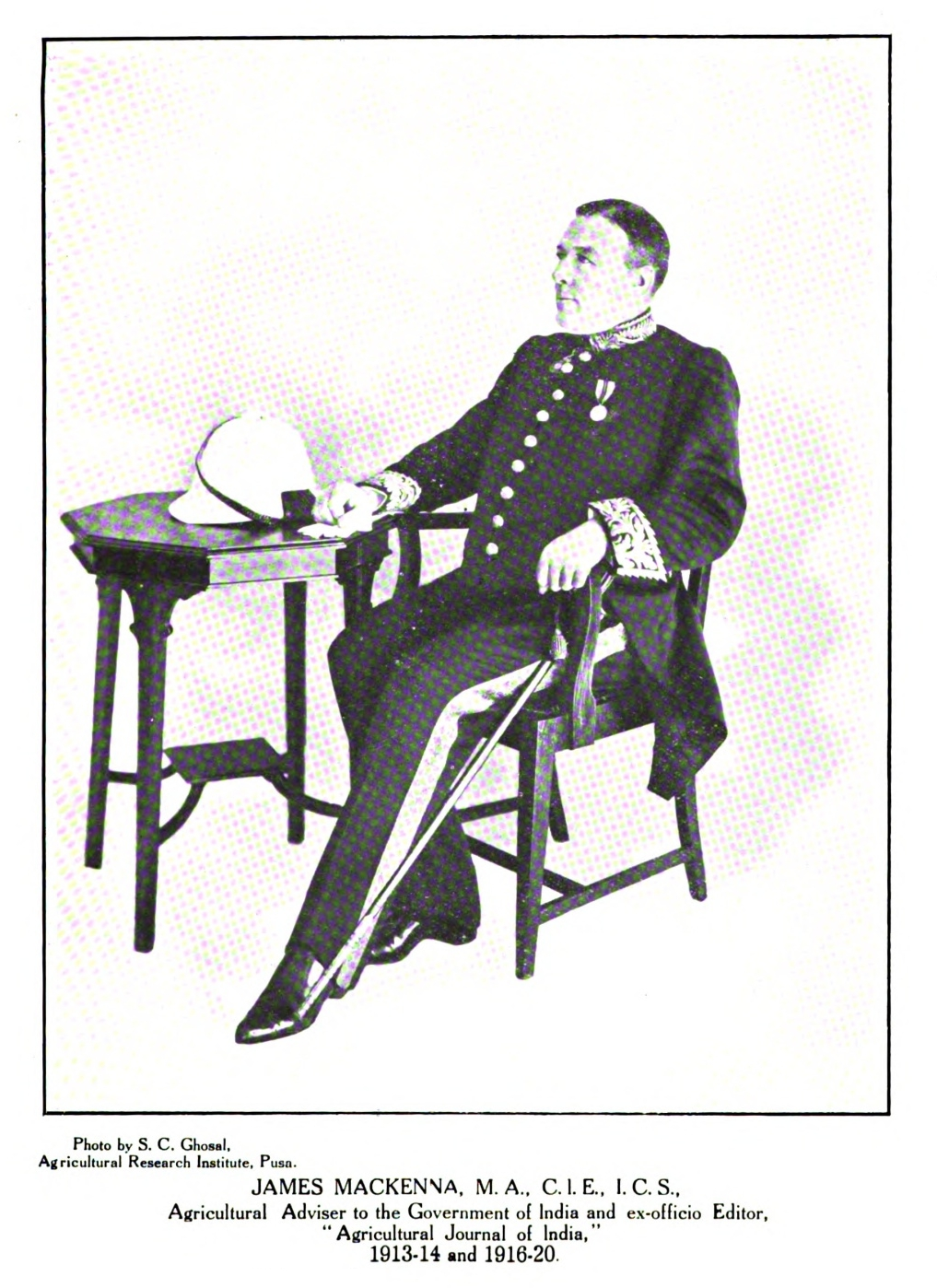
MacKenna, c. 1920

Sir James MacKenna CIE (15 August 1872 – 3 April 1940) was a Scottish-Indian civil servant who served as a director of agriculture in India and headed various committees that promoted scientific agriculture in India.

== Life and work ==
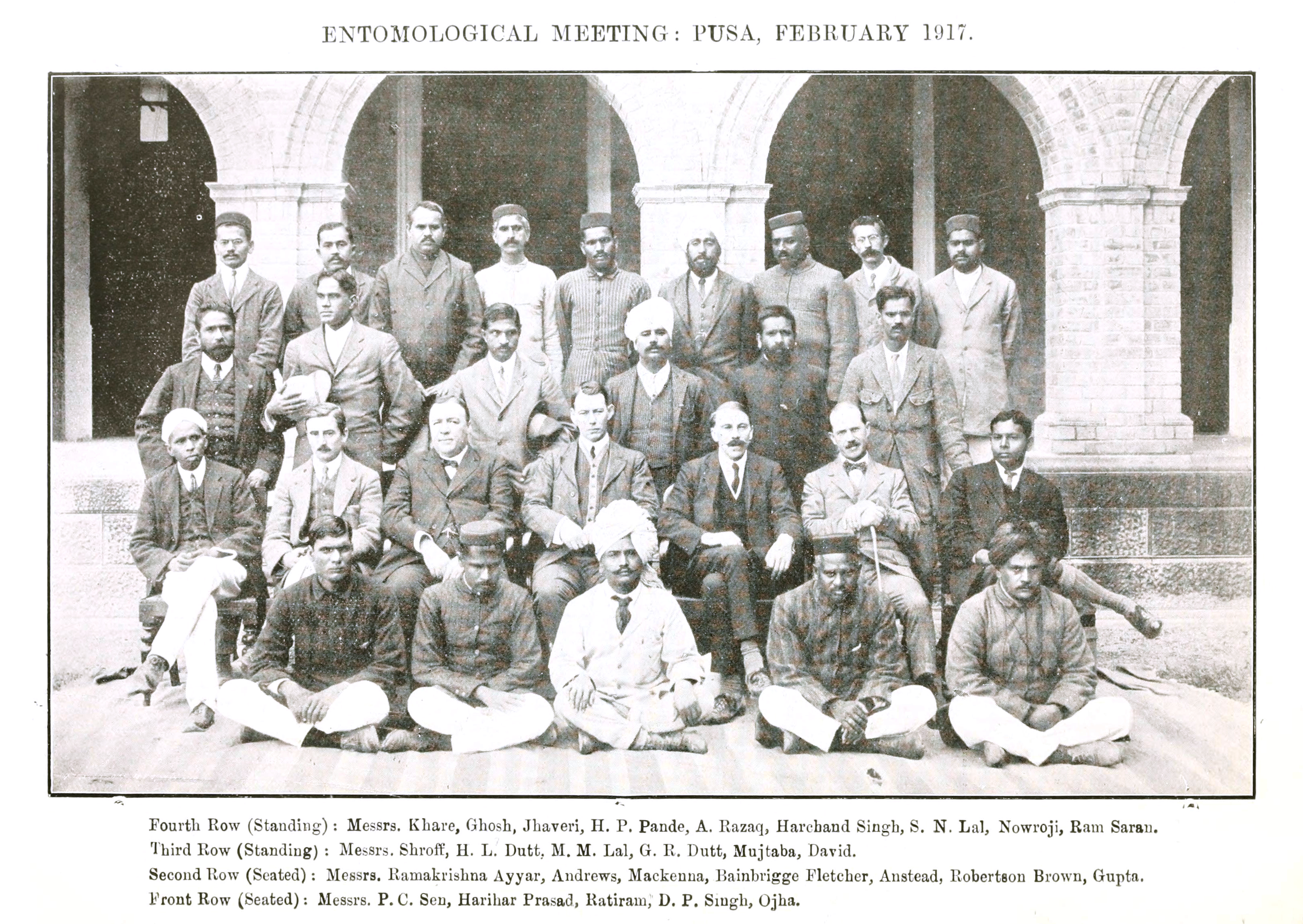
J. MacKenna. seated on second row, third from left. in 1917 at a meeting of Indian entomologists

MacKenna was the son of Reverend Robert MacKenna of Dumfries. He was educated at Dumfries Academy and at the University of Edinburgh and Balliol College, Oxford. He joined the Indian Civil Services in 1894 and was posted in Burma. He married Esther Florence in 1902. He became a Director of Agriculture in 1906. In 1913 he was Agricultural Advisor when Bernhard Coventry went on leave and replaced him in 1916. He was director of the Agricultural Research Institute at Pusa in 1916 serving until 1920. He was also briefly Secretary to the Government in the Department of Revenue and Agriculture. He presided over the Indian Cotton Committee from 1917 to 1918.

He received a Delhi Durbar Medal in 1911 and was a member of the Royal Commission on Agriculture in India from 1926 to 1927. He was made CIE in 1917 and knighted in 1925. He retired on 30 April 1920.
