= Bernard Coventry =

British agronomist (1859–1929)

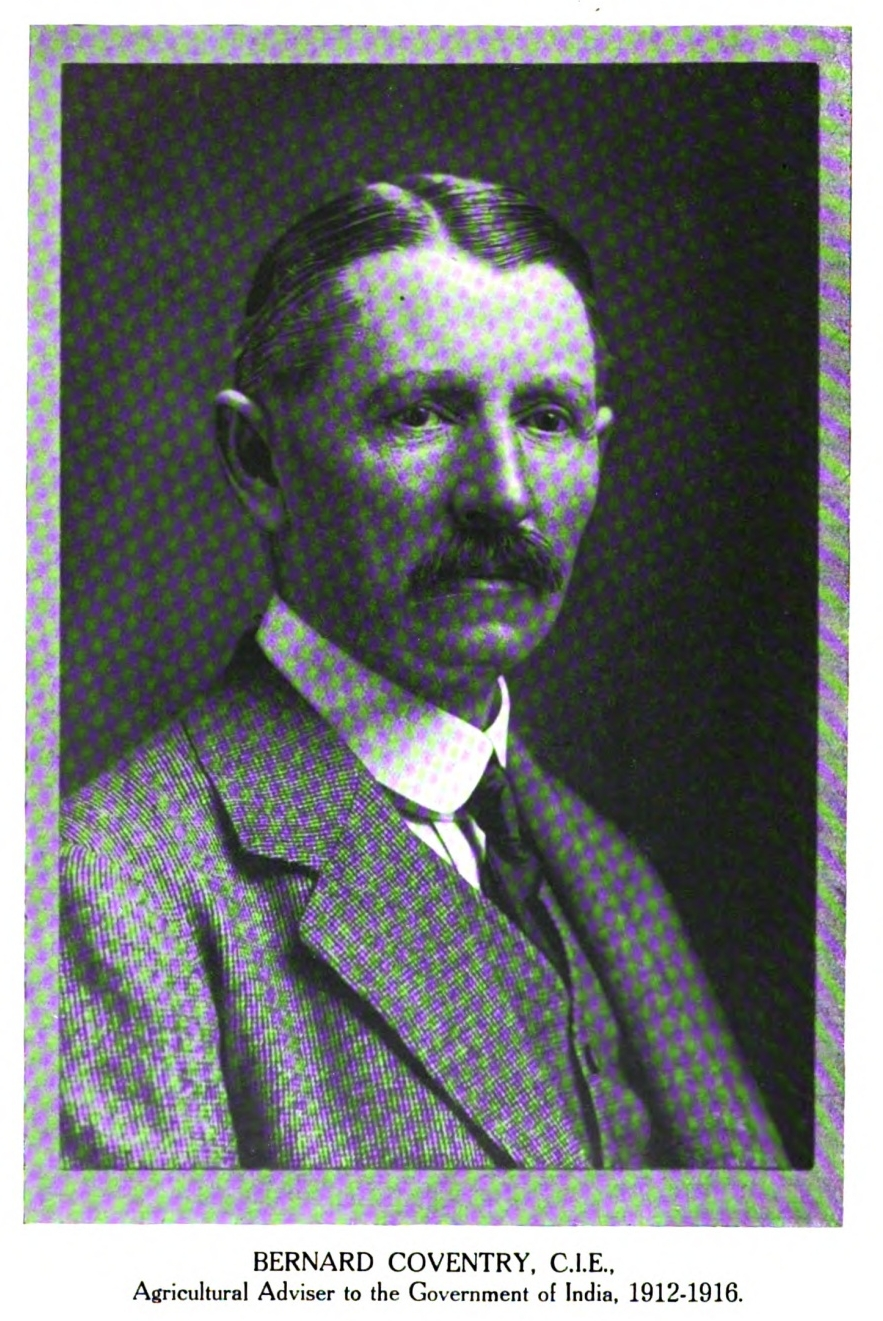
Portrait, c. 1918

Bernard Coventry CIE (10 December 1859 – 26 January 1929) was a British agronomist who served as the founding director of the Imperial Agricultural Research Institute in Pusa, Bengal Presidency, India from 1904.

== Life and work ==
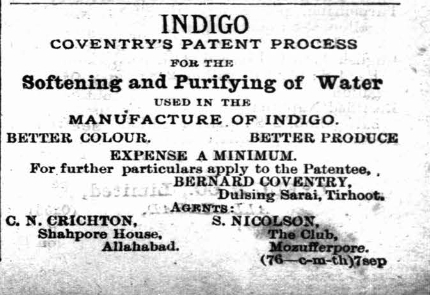

Coventry was the son of Reverend John Coventry of Burgate House, Hants, and Catherine Seton. He was educated at Beaumont College and went to work in the indigo industry in India in 1881 becoming a part owner of the Dalsing Sarai Indigo Concern in Bihar. He conducted experiments to introduce rhea (Boehmeria nivea) cultivation in India and calculated the profitability of processing and exporting the fibre to Europe. His research was commended by Sir John Woodburn in 1902. In 1800 he was involved in research on indigo, taking out a patent for improved indigo processing. In 1898 some Bihar indigo farmers formed an Indigo Improvement Syndicate (IIS) with the aims of conducting experiments. In 1901 Bihar Indigo Planters Association (BIPA) with their chemist Christopher Rawson and the IIS combined to work on experiments on the recommendation of Sir George Watt. Coventry worked with Begg, Dunlop and Company who hired a chemist E.A. Hancock and tried testing better indigo species (including Indigofera arrecta, experiments on which were also made at Calcutta by David Prain) and varieties from around the world. After Hancock left, the station at Dalsingserai hired Hugh Martin-Leake and chemist William P. Bloxam. By 1903 the BIPA stopped funding the project but IIS continued to support it and a fresh government grant was made in 1903 leading to a research station at Peeprah. Here Cyril Bergtheil was recruited. The research work was highly regarded by several officials including James Mollison, Denzil Ibbetson, and David Prain. Mollison who became the first Inspector General of Agriculture recommended that the Dalsingserai team be absorbed into the first agricultural science establishment formed at Pusa. Coventry was appointed principal of the Agricultural College at Pusa in 1904. The institution later became the Imperial Agricultural Research Institute. He was appointed a Companion, Order of the Indian Empire on 14 June 1912 and served as an advisor on agriculture to the government until 1916.

Coventry married Ella Gordon Dalgleish on 7 January 1892 at Dalsingserai and they had four daughters.
