= FJF =

FJF can refer to:

- Toucan, a family of tropical birds, by Catalogue of Life identifier
- Future Jobs Fund, an initiative of the British government to help unemployed people
- Free Jazz Four, a Swedish and American jazz quartet that produced the album Blow Horn
- FJF, an identification code assigned to No. 24 Elementary Flying Training School RAF.

== See also ==
- Frederick John Freshwater Shaw (1885–1936) or F. J. F. Shaw, a British botanist and mycologist
