= Bloxam =

Bloxam is a surname, and may refer to:

- Andrew Bloxam (1801–1878), English Anglican priest and naturalist
- Andrew Bloxam (cricketer) (1839–1923), English botanist, law officer and cricketer
- John Francis Bloxam (1873–1928), English churchman and author
- John Rouse Bloxam (1807–1891), English academic and clergyman
- Matthew Bloxam (1805–1888), English antiquarian and archaeologist
- Matthew Bloxam (MP) (1744–1822), British businessman and politician
- William Popplewell Bloxam (1860–1913), English chemist

== See also ==
- Bloxham (surname)
