= Trilochan Mohapatra =

Indian biotechnologist and politician (born 1962)

- Born: 20 April 1962 (age 64); Kharibil, Cuttack, Odisha, India
- Education: Ravenshaw College; Orissa University of Agriculture and Technology; Indian Agricultural Research Institute; University of Arizona
- Known for: Studies in Molecular genetics and Genomics
- Awards: 1994 INSA Young Scientist Medal; 1994 INSA Professor LSS Kumar Memorial Award; 2001 NAAS-Tata Young Scientist Award; 2002 IARI BP Pal Memorial Award; 2003 N-BIOS Prize; 2007 NASI-Reliance Platinum Jubilee Award; 2015 Indian Genetics Congress Lifetime Achievement Award; 2016 NAAS Recognition Award \ 2016 Om Prakash Bhasin Award
- Scientific career
- Fields: Plant biotechnology
- Workplaces: National Academy of Agricultural Research Management; Indian Agricultural Research Institute; Indian Council of Agricultural Research; Department of Agricultural Research and Education; Protection of Plant Varieties and Farmers' Rights Authority

Trilochan Mohapatra (born 20 April 1962) is an Indian biotechnologist, geneticist, former government secretary of the Department of Agricultural Research and Education (DARE) and former director general of the Indian Council of Agricultural Research. Known for his studies in the fields of molecular genetics and genomics, Mohapatra is an elected fellow of the National Academy of Sciences, India, the National Academy of Agricultural Sciences, the Indian National Science Academy and the Indian Society of Genetics and Plant Breeding. The Department of Biotechnology of the Government of India awarded him the National Bioscience Award for Career Development, one of the highest Indian science awards, for his contributions to biosciences in 2003.

== Biography ==
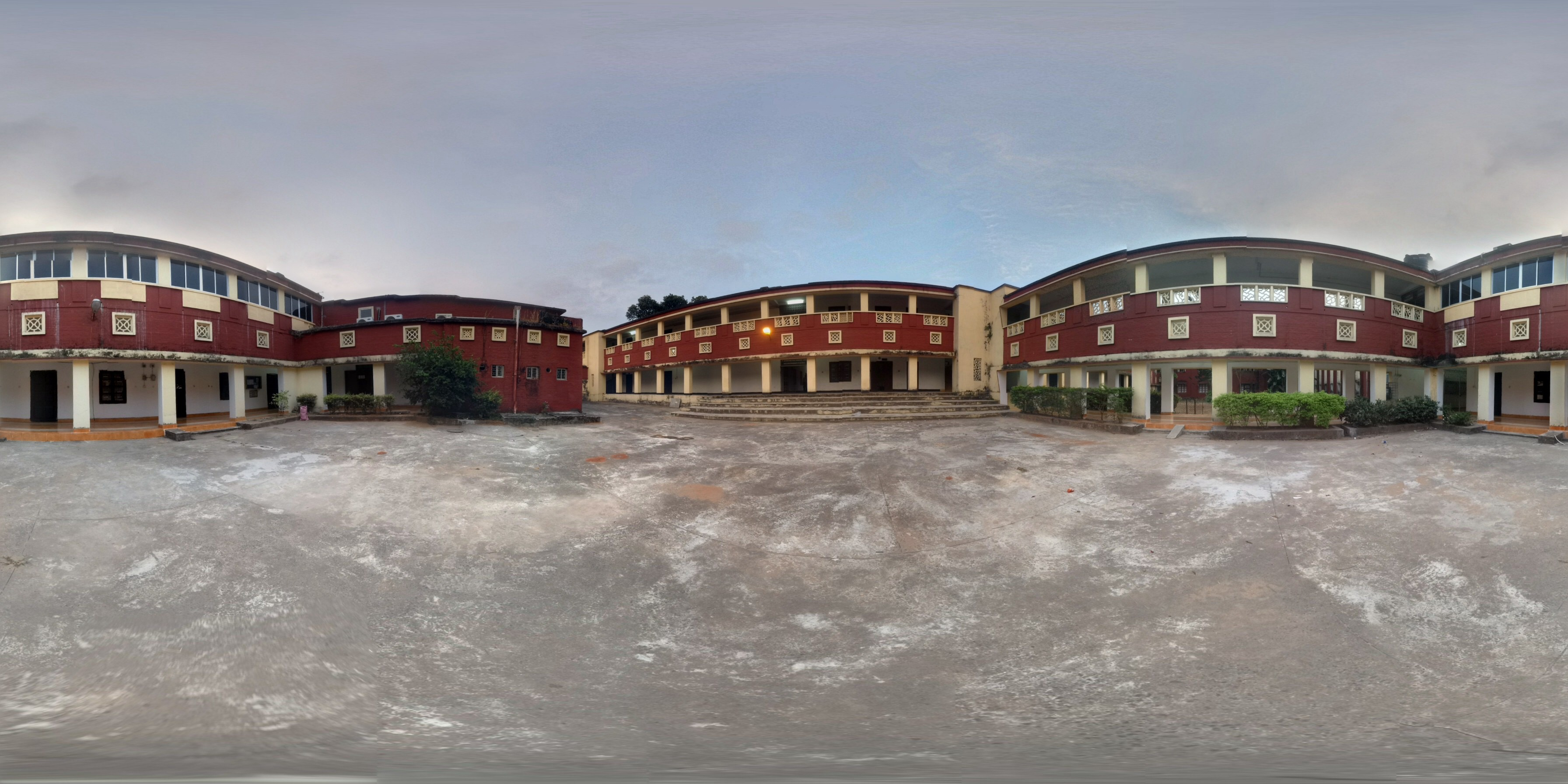
Orissa University of Agriculture and Technology.

Trilochan Mohapatra was born on 20 April 1962 at Kharibil village in Cuttack in the Indian state of Odisha. After completing early schooling at Laxmi Narayan High School at Eranch near his home village in 1978, he did his pre-university studies at Ravenshaw College (present day Ravenshaw University) in 1980. Joining Orissa University of Agriculture and Technology (OUAT), he earned a BSc in agriculture in 1985 as well as an MSc in genetics in 1987 and continued at the institution for his doctoral studies to secure a PhD in 1992. He started his career in 1992 as a senior scientist at the National Research Centre on Plant Biotechnology (NRCPB), a centre of the Indian Agricultural Research Institute (IARI) for advanced research in the fields of molecular biology and biotechnology in crop plants where he worked until 2012, serving as a principal scientist from 2005. In between, he did advanced training in rice genome sequencing at the Arizona Genomics Institute of the University of Arizona during 2003–04. In 2012, he was appointed as the director of Central Rice Research Institute as well as the vice-chancellor of the Indian Agricultural Research Institute. He served as the director of IARI in the year 2015-16 and on 22 February 2016, he was appointed as the secretary of the Department of Agricultural Research and Education (DARE), a department working under the Ministry of Agriculture to act as the government interface for promoting agricultural research and education in India a position he served till 2022. Simultaneously, he was holding the position of the director general of the Indian Council of Agricultural Research till 2022. Thereafter he was succeeded by Himanshu Pathak.

Mohapatra is married and the family resides at National Agriculture Science Centre (NASC) Complex along Dev Prakash Shastri Marg in New Delhi.

== Legacy ==
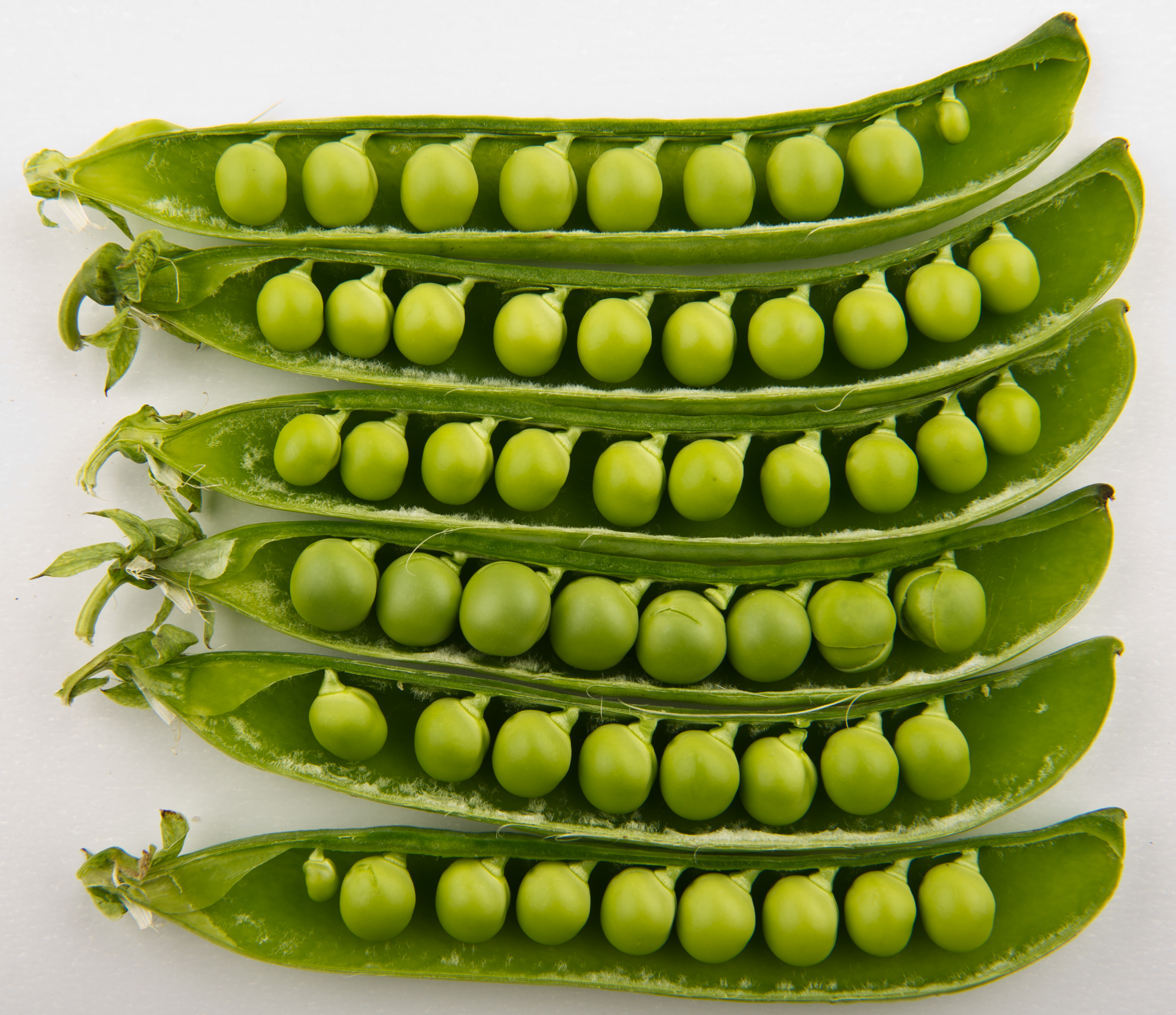
Peas

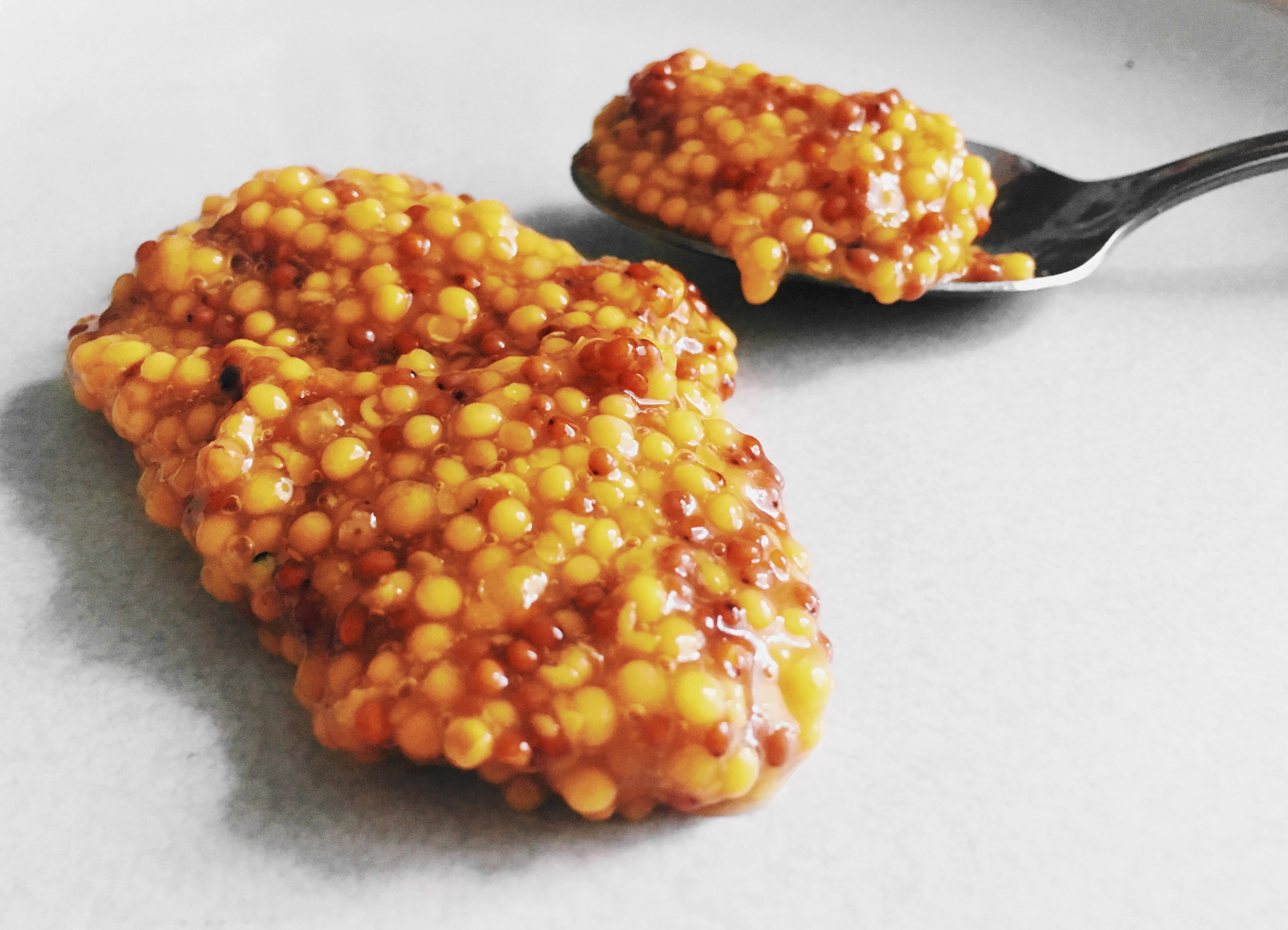
Mustard

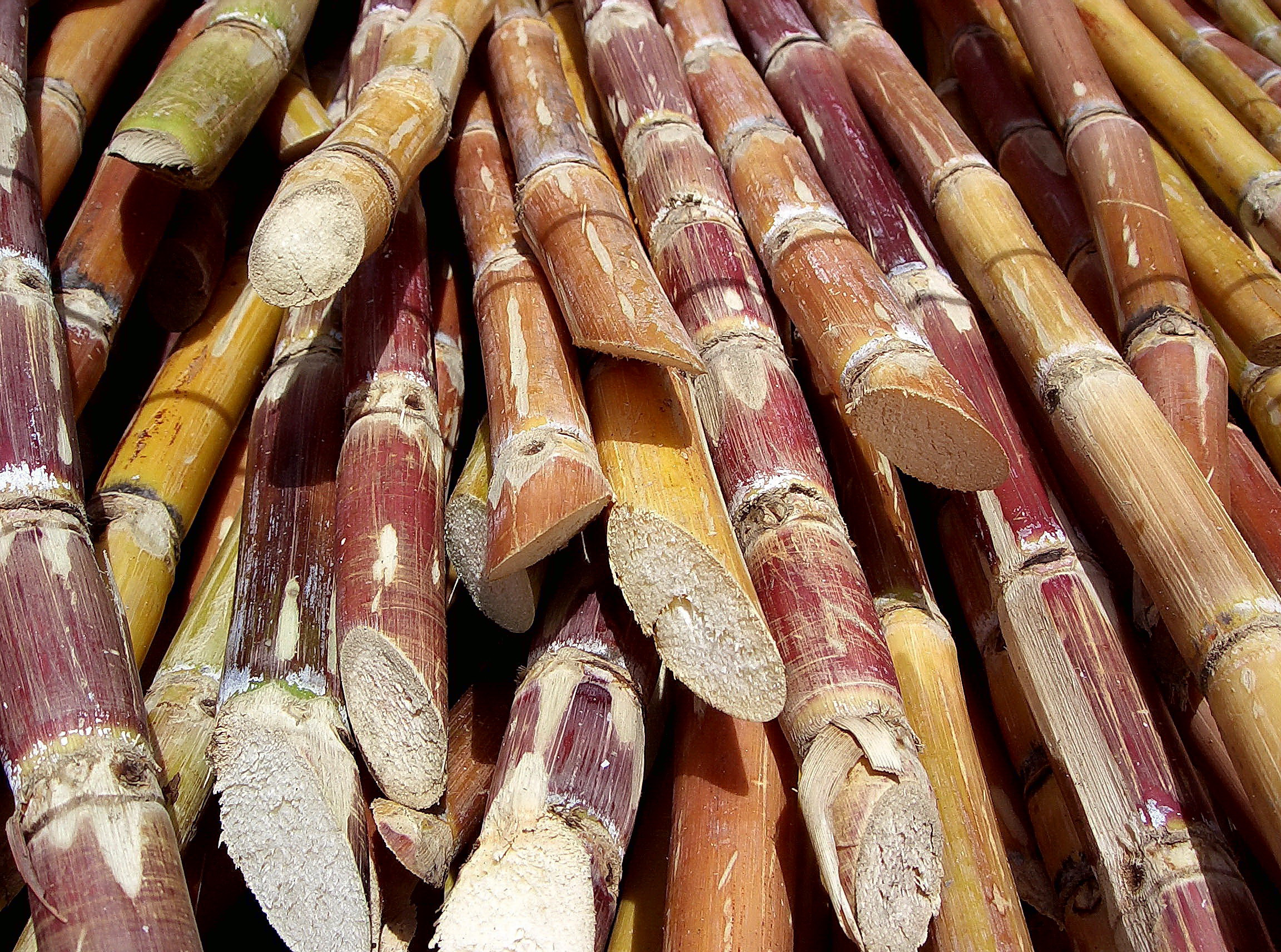
Sugarcane

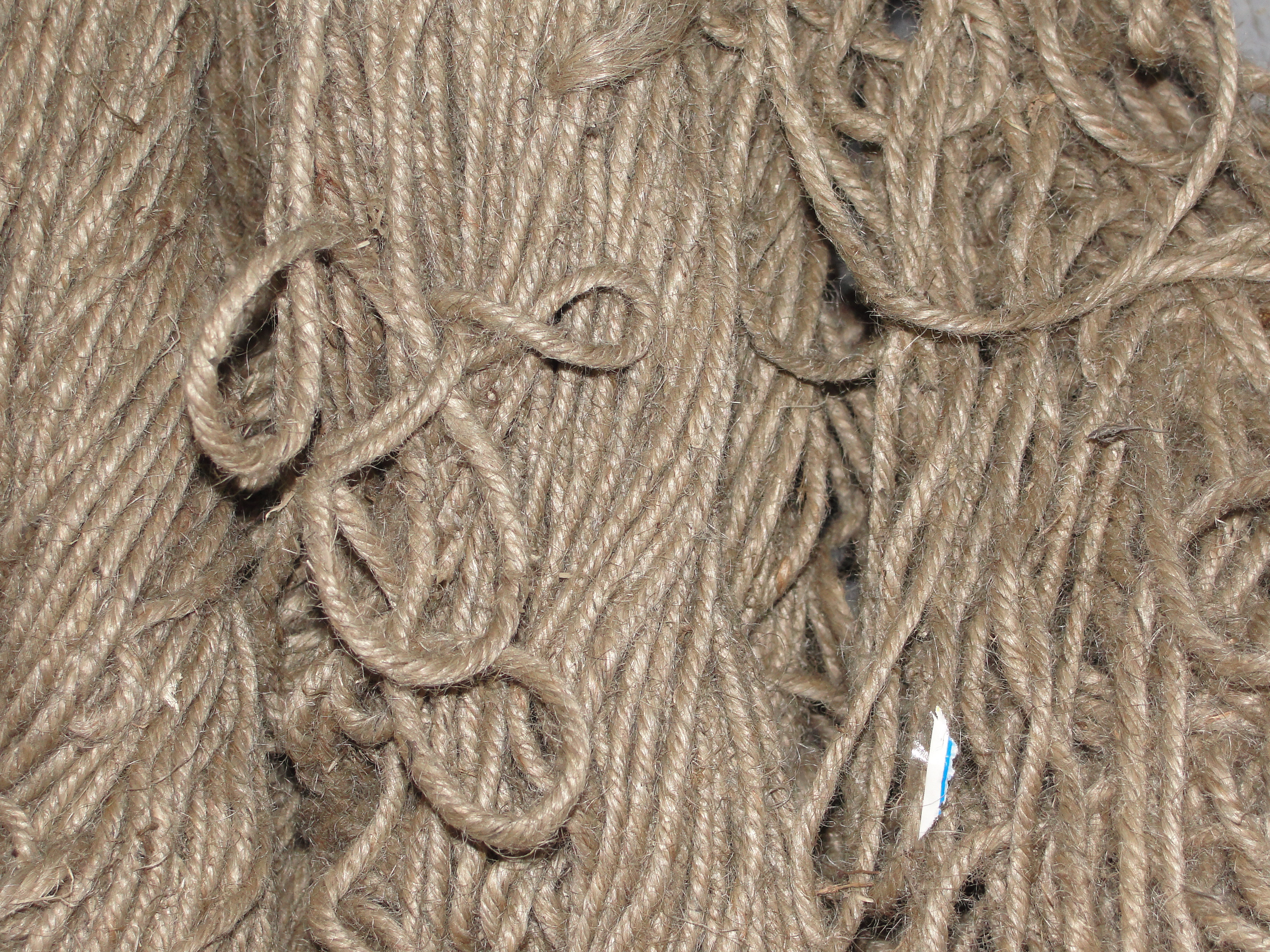
Jute

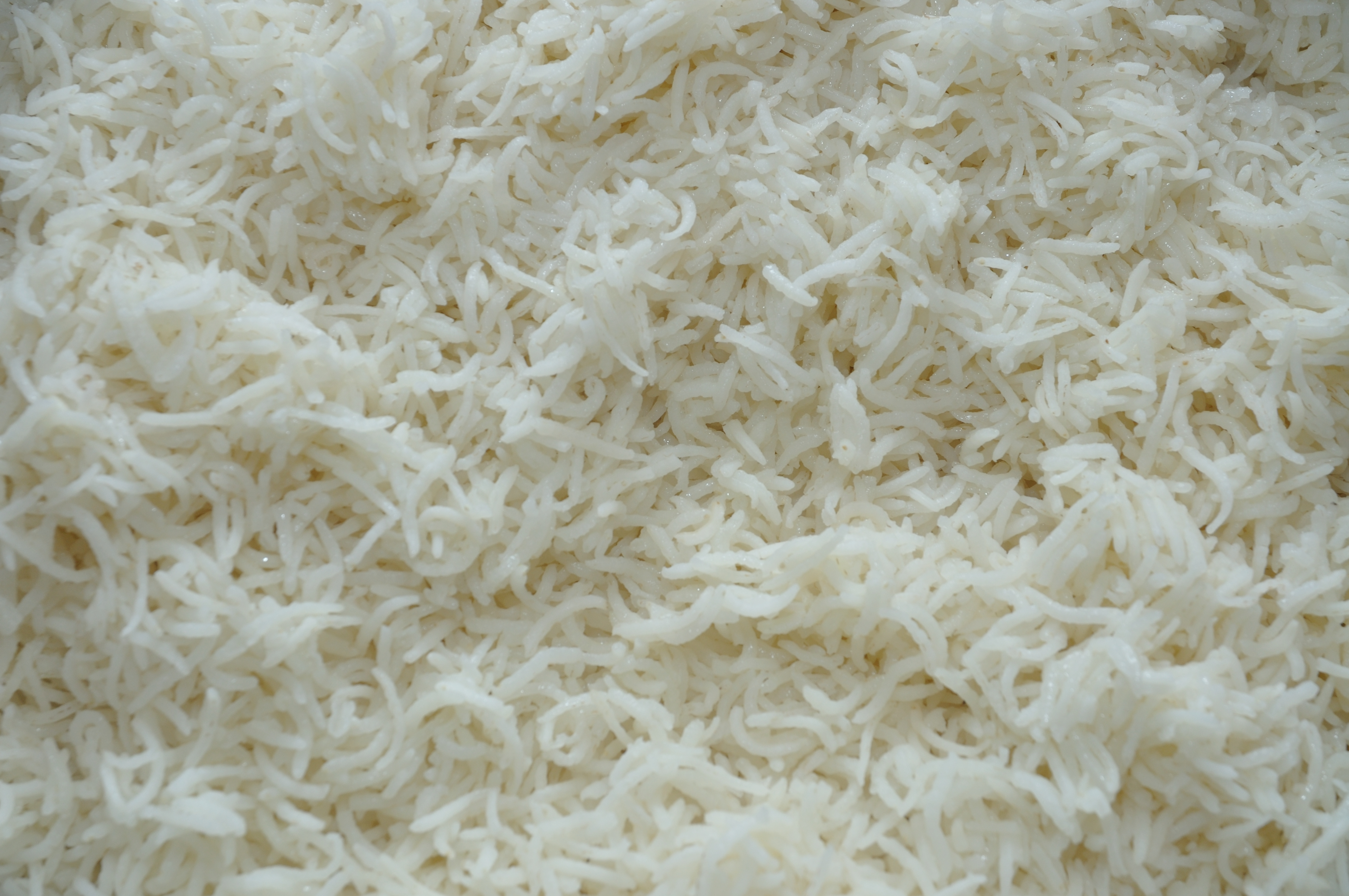
Basmati rice

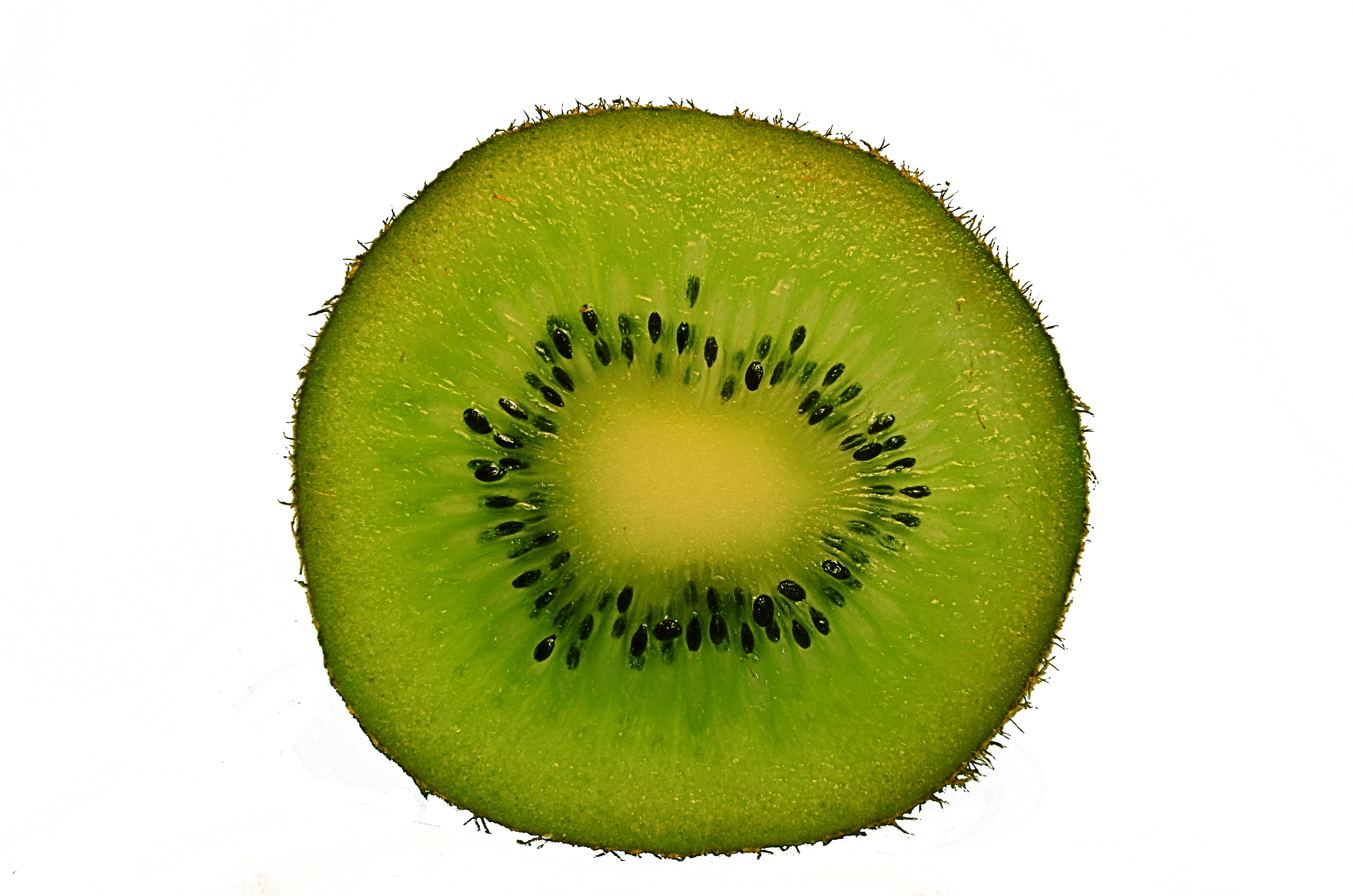
Kiwifruit

Mohapatra, whose research interests covered the fields of molecular genetics and genomics, is known to have worked on the bacterial sequencing of rice and tomato and is credited with the development of a high-yielding basmati rice which is resistant to bacterial leaf blight which was accomplished using molecular marker assisted selection, physical mapping and genome sequencing. Molecular mapping of genome and tagging of gene in mustard, molecular mapping and gene isolation in Basmati rice hybrid, marker assisted selection for powdery mildew resistance in pea, molecular marker analysis of sugarcane, identification of pearl millet hybrids, sex differentiation of kiwifruit employing Random Amplification of Polymorphic DNA technique and evaluation of genetic diversity of jute were some of the other research projects he has undertaken, and he holds several patents for the processes he has developed. His studies have been documented by way of a number of articles (Note: Please see Selected bibliography section) and ResearchGate, an online repository of scientific articles has listed 182 of them. He has also guided several students in their doctoral and master's studies and has imparted training on molecular breeding to over 25 scientists.

As the head of the Indian Council of Agricultural Research, Mohapatra is in charge of 101 ICAR institutes and 71 agricultural universities, spread across India. He sits in the council of the National Academy of Agricultural Sciences and is a member of the executive committee of Borlaug Institute for South Asia. He served as an expert on Germplasm Characterization at the National Institute of Agricultural Biotechnology, Korea, having received an invitation from the National Institute of Agricultural Biotechnology (NIAB), in 2004. He is a life member of the Indian Society of Genetics and Plant Breeding and the Society of Plant Biochemistry and Biotechnology. He is also a former associate editor of BMC Genetics and the Journal of Genetics.

== Awards and honors ==
Mohapatra received two awards from the Indian National Science Academy in 1994, namely INSA Young Scientist Medal and Professor LSS Kumar Memorial Award. He was selected for the NAAS-Tata Young Scientist Award of the National Academy of Agricultural Sciences (NAAS) in 2001; he also received two other honors from NAAS, the elected fellowship in 2006 and the Recognition Award in 2016. The next year, the Indian Agricultural Research Institute selected him for the B. P. Pal Memorial Award. The Department of Biotechnology of the Government of India awarded him the National Bioscience Award for Career Development, one of the highest Indian science awards in 2003. The Indian Society of Genetics and Plant Breeding elected him as a fellow in 2004 and he received the elected fellowships of the National Academy of Sciences, India in 2005 and the Indian National Science Academy in 2013. The National Academy of Sciences, India honored him again in 2007 with the NASI-Reliance Platinum Jubilee Award and he received the Lifetime Achievement Award at the Indian Genetics Congress of 2015. He is also a recipient of the Bioved Agri-Innovation Award of 2015 and the Om Prakash Bhasin Award and the IMS Diamond Jubilee Memorial Award, both in 2016. The award orations delivered by him include the Prasanna Kumar Dash Memorial Lecture of the Orissa Environmental Society (2013), Dr. Gopal Chandra Patnaik Memorial Lecture of the Bigyan Prachar Samiti (2013), Platinum Jubilee Lecture Award of 101st Indian Science Congress (2014) and the inaugural Prof. S.N. Patnaik Memorial Lecture of Utkal University (2014). Honorary D.Sc. degree on 7th convocation ceremony by Mahatma Gandhi Chitrakoot Gramodaya Vishwavidhyala, Chitrakoot Satna.

== Selected bibliography ==
- Sato, Shusei; Tabata, Satoshi; Hirakawa, Hideki; Asamizu, Erika; Shirasawa, Kenta; Isobe, Sachiko; Kaneko, Takakazu; Nakamura, Yasukazu; Shibata, Daisuke (May 2012). "The tomato genome sequence provides insights into fleshy fruit evolution". Nature. 485 (7400): 635–641. Bibcode:2012Natur.485..635T. doi:10.1038/nature11119. ISSN 1476-4687. PMC 3378239. PMID 22660326.
- Amarawathi, Yellari; Singh, Rakesh; Singh, Ashok K.; Singh, Vijai P.; Mohapatra, Trilochan; Sharma, Tilak R.; Singh, Nagendra K. (1 January 2008). "Mapping of quantitative trait loci for basmati quality traits in rice (Oryza sativa L.)". Molecular Breeding. 21 (1): 49–65. doi:10.1007/s11032-007-9108-8. ISSN 1380-3743. S2CID 30550884.
- Parida, Swarup K.; Kumar, K. Anand Raj; Dalal, Vivek; Singh, Nagendra K.; Mohapatra, Trilochan (1 March 2006). "Unigene derived microsatellite markers for the cereal genomes". Theoretical and Applied Genetics. 112 (5): 808–817. doi:10.1007/s00122-005-0182-1. ISSN 0040-5752. PMID 16429310. S2CID 24637963.

== See also ==
- Gene mapping
- Genome
