= Bloxham (surname) =

Bloxham is a surname, and may refer to:

- Albert Bloxham (1905–1996), English footballer
- Andrew Bloxam (1801–1878), English clergyman and naturalist
- Donald Bloxham (born 1973), British historian
- Elizabeth Bloxham (1877–1962), Irish feminist and nationalist
- Jenny Bloxham (born 1949), New Zealand politician
- Jeremy Bloxham (born 1960), British geophysicist
- Josh Bloxham (born 1990), New Zealand basketball player
- Ken Bloxham (1954–2000), New Zealand rugby union footballer
- Reinga Bloxham (born c.1975), New Zealand netball player and coach
- Tom Bloxham (footballer, born 2003) (born 2003), English footballer
- Tom Bloxham (footballer, born 2005), (born 2005), Irish footballer
- Tom Bloxham (property developer) (born 1963), British property developer
- William D. Bloxham (1835–1911), American politician, twice Governor of Florida

== See also ==
- Bloxam
