= Agricultural Research Service (ICAR, India) =

Indian research agency

Service Overview
Abbreviation	A.R.S.
Formed	1 November 1973
Country	India
Training Ground	National Academy of Agricultural Research Management, Hyderabad
Controlling Authority	Ministry of Agriculture & Farmers' Welfare, Department of Agriculture Research and Education
Legal personality	Indian Council of Agricultural Research
General nature	Research; Project Formulation; Research Management; Extension and Training; Education
- Cadre Size

Head of the Agricultural Research Services
- Secretary, Department of Agriculture Research and Education, Ministry of Agriculture (India) and director general, ICAR; Current: Dr. Himanshu Pathak

Agriculture Research Services (ARS) is the Natural Resource services under the Indian Council of Agricultural Research (ICAR), organization under the Department of Agricultural Research and Education (DARE), Ministry of Agriculture, Government of India.

The purpose of the service is to set a cutting edge model of education, perform research for its application in agriculture, agro forestry, animal husbandry, fisheries, home science and allied sciences. The agricultural research services helps to make the country self-reliant as far in food grains, horticultural crops, milk, meat, fish and eggs.

== Recruitment Board ==
The Agricultural Scientists Recruitment Board (ASRB) conducts all India competitive examinations for ARS to recruit entry level posts. Pursuant to the Gajendragadkar Report of 1972, the ASRB was established on 1 November 1973.

== Examination ==
The ARS examination consists of preliminary, main and interview. The first is the qualifying examination. All candidates who desire to appear for the ARS examination have to appear for both prelims and mains sessions. Total exam is of 300 marks of which the mains exam is of 240 marks and interview is of 60 marks. The examination is the initial port of entry into the services of ICAR and the new entrants are imparted foundation training called as Foundation Course for Agricultural Research Services (FOCARS) at the National Academy of Agricultural Research Management, Hyderabad.

== Foundation Course for Agricultural Research Service ==
FOCARS is designed for the newly recruited entry level scientists to the Agricultural Research Service of the ICAR. The course aims at providing exposure to the trainees on the concepts and principles of project management with special emphasis on project formulation and implementation. It also includes capsules in related areas on human resources development, and information and communication management. The 108th batch of FOCARS trained from July-Oct 2018.

== Agricultural Research Service Scientists' Forum ==
The Agricultural Research Service Scientists' Forum (ARSSF) of the scientists recruited by the ICAR were registered as a society on 12 August 1980 at Shillong and on 22 November 1995, it was formally recognized by the ICAR.

== Career progression ==
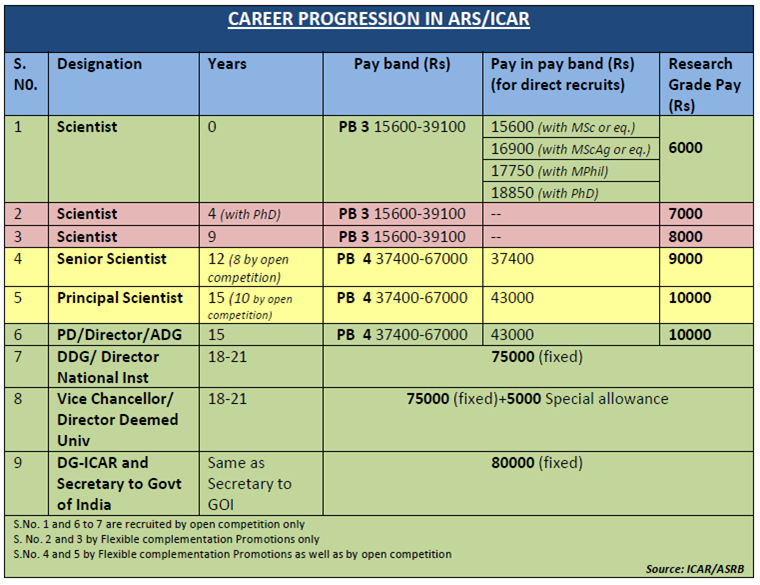
Career progression in Agricultural Research Service

The recruits through the ARS Examination are designated as ′ARS′ or 'scientist'. The post of entry level ARS or Scientist is same with Jr. Class I cadre of Central government. The initial pay is fixed after granting advance increments for higher qualification, with PhDs getting the highest salary.

They are kept on 'tenure track' or 'probation' for 2 years and upon satisfactory completion of this period they are given 'tenure'and confirmed in the ARS. On completing service for designated years and meeting set performance criteria, they are promoted to the next higher grades in a flexible complementation system known as Career Advancement Scheme (CAS).

Incumbents without a PhD degree are given paid study leave to acquire PhD qualification, which is necessary for career progression. Through CAS, scientists can rise up to principal scientist grade, which is equivalent to the scale of joint secretary to the Government of India. The ARS encourages fresh infusion of talent at all senior levels through lateral entry in which incumbent scientists can participate in the open competition and move their career ahead in much shorter time than CAS. All the research management positions are filled through open competition. The director general of ICAR is the highest-ranked member of the ARS, who is ex officio secretary to the Government of India, Department of Agricultural Research and Education (DARE), Ministry of Agriculture.
