= William McCrea =

William McCrea may refer to:

- William McCrea (astronomer) (1904–1999), British astronomer and mathematician
- William McCrea, Baron McCrea of Magherafelt and Cookstown (born 1948), politician from Northern Ireland

== See also ==
- William McCrae, Canadian farmer and politician
- William McRae (disambiguation)
