= Subrahmaniam Nagarajan =

Indian wheat pathologist

- Born: 7 November 1945; Chennai, India
- Died: 25 December 2016 (aged 71); Chennai, India
- Education: Delhi University, Agricultural College in Coimbatore
- Known for: Wheat pathology
- Awards: Award of the Coromandel Fertilizers
- Scientific career
- Fields: Biologist
- Workplaces: Indian Agricultural Research Institute

Subrahmaniam Nagarajan (7 November 1945 in Chennai, India - 25 December 2016) was an Indian wheat pathologist. He studied in Chennai till high school and completed his early education at the Agriculture College, Coimbatore, then pursued his masters at the Indian Agriculture Research Institute, New Delhi and received his doctorate in Agriculture from the Delhi University. He is the Project Director of the All India Wheat program and author of more than 120 research papers, 50 book chapters and two textbooks.

Nagarajan, who is internationally respected as a wheat pathologist, has been recognized with the Borlaug award recently for his contribution to the advancement of the wheat program, pathology of wheat rusts and its elimination, and as an educator. He joined the IARI / ICAR in 1974 as wheat pathologist. Due to Nagarajan's work, for the last 12 years there has been no serious crop loss due to rust epidemics.

He joined as Director, Indian Agricultural Research Institute, New Delhi in April 2002. As Director of IARI, he developed the vision document and re-set the research agenda making a shift from production-oriented research to quality improvement, value addition and market-oriented research.

After IARI, Dr S Nagarajan was tasked with establishing the Intellectual Property regime for plant varieties in India, under the albeit of Protection of Plant Varieties and Farmers’ Rights Authority (PPV & FRA), Government of India, New Delhi; where he served as Chairperson from 2005. Dr Nagarajan helped create and make operational in India, protection of plant varieties guided by Article 27(3)(b) of the World Trade Organisation’s Agreement on Trade-Related Aspects of Intellectual Property Rights (TRIPs). He retired from active service in 2010 and chiefly contributed as an advisor for M. S. Swaminathan Research Foundation (MSSRF) till his death in 2016.

== Awards ==
- Winner of Dr. Norman Borlaug Award of the Coromandel Fertilizers (2004–2005) instituted in honour of Nobel laureate Dr Norman E. Borlaug.
- Winner of B. P. Pal Memorial Award (Honoured by Indian Science Congress).
- Recognised with the Rafi Ahmed Kidwai Award of the ICAR (1987-1988).
- Award of Distinction conferred at International Plant Protection Congress, The Hague (1995).
- Honoured with Om Prakash Bashin Award (2001).
- Honoured with Dr.K.S.Bilgrami Award of INSA (2004).
- Fellow of the National Academy of Agricultural Sciences (1992).
- Fellow of the National Academy of Sciences, Allahabad (2002).
- Fellow of the Alexander von Humboldt Foundation (1978) Germany
