= Anil Grover =

Indian molecular biologist (born 1958)

- Born: 15 August 1958 (age 68); Delhi, India
- Education: University of Delhi; Indian Agricultural Research Institute
- Known for: Studies on Oryza sativa and Arabidopsis thaliana
- Awards: 1990 INSA Young Scientists Medal; 1997 B. M. Birla Science Prize; 2002 N-BIOS Prize; ISCA Professor Hira Lal Chakravarty Award
- Scientific career
- Fields: Plant molecular biology
- Workplaces: Jawaharlal Nehru University; Tata Energy and Resources Institute; University of Delhi; University of Guelph; CSIRO Division of Plant Industry; University of California, Davis
- Doctoral advisor: S. K. Sinha

Anil Grover (born 15 August 1958) is an Indian molecular biologist, professor and the head of the Department of Plant Molecular Biology at the University of Delhi. He also heads the Anil Grover Lab of the department, serving as the principal investigator. Known for his research in the field of molecular biology of plants, Grover is an elected fellow of all the three major Indian science academies namely the National Academy of Sciences, India, the Indian Academy of Sciences and the Indian National Science Academy as well as the National Academy of Agricultural Sciences. The Department of Biotechnology of the Government of India awarded him the National Bioscience Award for Career Development, one of the highest Indian science awards, for his contributions to biosciences in 2002.

== Biography ==
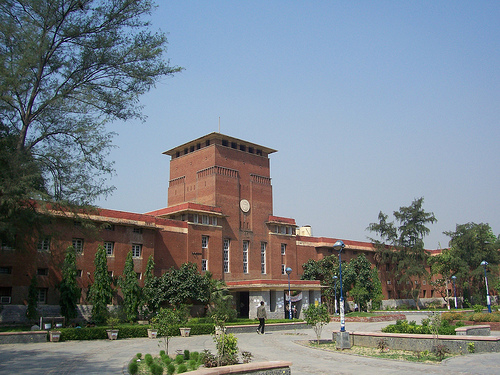
University of Delhi

Anil Grover, born on the Indian Independence Day of 1958 in the National Capital Region of Delhi to Shori Singh Grover-Krishna Grover couple, did his undergraduate and master's studies at the University of Delhi, earning the degrees of BSc (honors) and MSc in 1977 and 1979 respectively. Subsequently, he did his doctoral research at the Indian Agricultural Research Institute under the guidance of S. K. Sinha and secured a PhD in 1984 for his thesis, Carbon Nitrogen Metabolism of Leaves Supporting Developing Pods in Legumes. He started his career as a research associate at Jawaharlal Nehru University in 1984 but moved to Tata Energy and Resources Institute, New Delhi in 1985, again as a research associate.

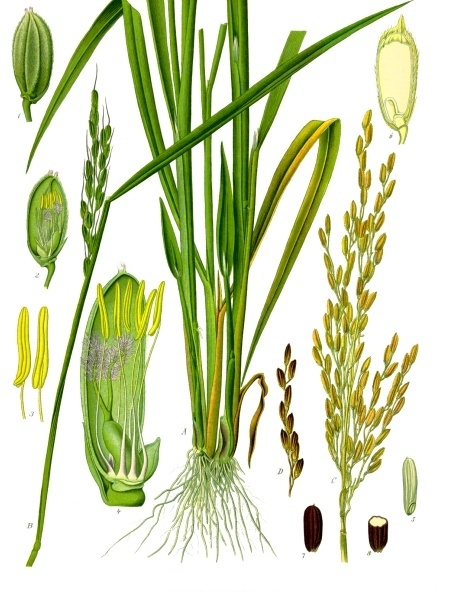
Oryza sativa - commonly known as Asian rice

In 1987, Grover went to Canada to continue his research at the University of Guelph and returned to India in 1988 to join his alma mater, Delhi University, as a scientist. A year later, he moved to the faculty position of a lecturer and worked in that position until 1993, simultaneously continuing his research at the university. It was during this time he received Rockefeller Foundation post-doctoral fellowship which he utilized to do his post-doctoral work at the CSIRO Division of Plant Industry in Australia. He returned to Delhi University in 1994 and resumed his career, taking up the post of a senior lecturer. He has been associated with Delhi University ever since, holding positions of a reader during 1996–2002, a professor since 2002 and heads the Department of Plant Molecular Biology. He also heads Anil Grover Lab where he hosts a number of research scholars as their principal investigator. He had a second stint at CSIRO Division of Plant Industry during 1996–98, this time as a career fellow of the Rockefeller Foundation. He also had a sabbatical at the University of California, Davis as a visiting fellow from 2002 to 2004.

Anil Grover is married to Anita Grover and the family lives in Janakpuri, New Delhi.

== Legacy ==
Grover's work is primarily focused on rice crop and Arabidopsis thaliana, a common weed found in India and their gene expressions to heat stress. He demonstrated through transcriptome and proteome studies that heat stress affects the biochemical, cellular and physiological processes of the plant and these studies have assisted in widening the understanding of genomic and proteomic alterations as well as the ROS metabolism of the plant. His studies have been documented by way of a number of articles (Note: Please see Selected bibliography section) and ResearchGate, an online repository of scientific articles has listed 161 of them. He has also mentored several research scholars in their doctoral and master's studies.

Grover sits in the national committee of the Indian National Science Academy for cooperating with the International Union of Biological Sciences (IUBS) and is a member of the board of directors of the 12th congress of the International Plant Molecular Biology (IPMB2018) scheduled to be held in Montpellier He is a former member of the Plant Science and an editorial board member of Plant Physiology and Biochemistry, both journals published by Elsevier. He guest-edited the special issue of Plant Reproduction journal on pollen development and the special issues of Current Science on Transgenic Crops in February 2003 and Physiology and Molecular Biology of Plants in 2008.

== Awards and honors ==
Anil Grover, a member of the Guha Research Conference and a recipient of the Professor Hira Lal Chakravarty Award of the Indian Science Congress Association, received Young Scientists Medal of the Indian National Science Academy in 1990 and the B. M. Birla Science Prize of the Birla Science Centre in 1997. Two years later, the National Academy of Sciences, India elected him as a fellow in 1999. The Department of Biotechnology of the Government of India awarded him the National Bioscience Award for Career Development, one of the highest Indian science awards in 2002. He received the elected fellowship of the National Academy of Agricultural Sciences in 2003 and of the Indian National Science Academy and the Indian Academy of Sciences in 2007. He has delivered award orations such as the G. V. Joshi Memorial lecture of the Indian Society of Plant Physiology (2011) and the research scholarships/fellowships he has held included the National Scholarship of the University Grants Commission of India, two fellowships from Rockefeller Foundation, an Indo-Australia visiting fellowship (2013), CIDA/NSERC research associateship of the Canadian International Development Agency and the J. C. Bose National Fellowship of the Science and Engineering Research Board twice; the first in 2011 and the second in 2015 with tenure of the fellowship running until 2020.

== Selected bibliography ==
- Singh, Upasana; Deb, Debadutta; Singh, Amanjot; Grover, Anil (26 January 2011). "Glycine-rich RNA binding protein of Oryza sativa inhibits growth of M15 E. coli cells". BMC Research Notes. 4: 18. doi:10.1186/1756-0500-4-18. ISSN 1756-0500. PMC 3040685. PMID 21269485.
- Singh, Amanjot; Singh, Upasana; Mittal, Dheeraj; Grover, Anil (8 February 2010). "Genome-wide analysis of rice ClpB/HSP100, ClpC and ClpD genes". BMC Genomics. 11: 95. doi:10.1186/1471-2164-11-95. ISSN 1471-2164. PMC 2829514. PMID 20141629.
- Singh, Amanjot; Sahi, Chandan; Grover, Anil (2009). "Chymotrypsin protease inhibitor gene family in rice: Genomic organization and evidence for the presence of a bidirectional promoter shared between two chymotrypsin protease inhibitor genes". Gene. 428 (1–2): 9–19. doi:10.1016/j.gene.2008.09.028. PMID 18952157.

== See also ==
- Reactive oxygen species
- Regulation of gene expression
