= Hugh Martin-Leake =

British economic botanist (1878–1977)

Hugh Martin-Leake (28 October 1878 – 29 April 1977) was a British economic botanist who worked in India, primarily on the improvement of indigo and opium cultivation. He served as an economic botanist and as a director of agriculture in the United Provinces.

== Early life and education ==
Martin-Leake was born in Hadley, Middlesex to William and Louisa Harriet (born Tennant) Martin-Leake and was educated at Dulwich and Christ College, Cambridge.

== Career ==
After receiving a degree, he worked under Marshall Ward on plant diseases in hops.

=== Pemberanda 1901-1904 ===
He applied for a position of biologist in Bihar and found the position already taken. In 1901, he was asked if he was interested since the previous holder had died from cholera. He took up the position and went to Muzaffarpur.

His work on indigo involved the examination of different varieties and the genetic improvement of the crop. He also had to solve seed dormancy issues, which he achieved by having them fed to ducks or by mechanical abrasion. He collected varieties with the help of A.T. Gage (then at the Sibpur botanic gardens) going on tour across the region. His attempts however were cut short due to the decline in the indigo industry following the synthesis of aniline. The research station at Pemberanda was placed under Bernard Coventry and Lord Curzon approved the development of agricultural research at Pusa.

=== United Provinces 1904-1915 ===
Martin-Leake was offered a position in the Indian Agricultural Service in 1904 and served briefly as garden in-charge at Saharanpur. Here he trained two Indian assistants for cotton breeding and one of them, Ram Prasad Singh (later Rai Sahib Ram Prasad Singh) became a cotton breeder of repute. Leake also worked on opium production with demand for morphine rising during World War I. He worked along with H.E. Annett on crop diversity in Papaver somniferum and morphine yields. He examined a measure that he called "effective rainfall", a cumulative measure of rain, and its effect on yield through statistical correlation.

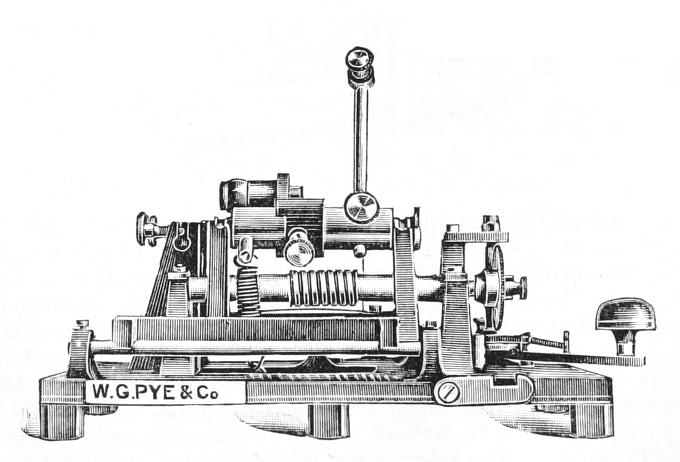
Microtome developed by Leake, c. 1901

=== India 1915-1919 ===
Martin-Leake was the Principal of Cawnpore Agricultural College from 1915 to 1919. During the First World War, he also served as a captain in the 7th UP Horse IDF.

=== United Provinces, 1919-1923 ===
While serving as director of agriculture in the United Provinces, Martin-Leake sought to improve the system of agriculture that involved zamindars or land owners merely renting out land to the farmers to one that involved more cooperation. He attempted to improve a course for zamindars at the Cawnpore agricultural college but this was a failure. He helped develop a rocking microtome and a seed-drill which he patented.

=== Later career ===
Martin-Leake left India in 1923, and worked briefly in Sudan on cotton and also served as a principal at the Imperial College of Tropical Agriculture in Trinidad. He served also as an editor for the International Sugar Journal from 1932 to 1960.

== Later life ==
In 1946, he was living at 10, Queen Edith's Way, Cambridge.

He lost vision in his later life and lived in Wardington with his wife. He had married Lois Millicent Frieda, the daughter of a chemist colleague of his, W.P. Bloxham. Their son, Cecil William Rhodes Martin-Leake, who served in the 22nd Dragoons, R.A.C. died in the Second World War in April 1945 and was buried in Becklingen War Cemetery.

Martin-Leake died in 1977.

== Works ==
Martin-Leake published several papers as well as some books, notably:

- Bases of Agricultural Practices and Economics in the United Provinces India (1920)
- The Foundation of Indian Agriculture (1923)
- Land Tenure and Agriculture Production in the Tropics (1927)
- Recent Advances in Agriculture Plant Breeding (1933) with H.H. Hunter
- Things not Generally Said (1949)
