= Jeremy Bloxham =

British geophyscist

Jeremy Bloxham FRS
- Born: April 29, 1960 (age 66)
- Alma mater: University of Cambridge
- Employer: Harvard University (1985–)
- Scientific career
- Thesis: Geomagnetic secular variation (1985)
- Doctoral advisor: David Gubbins

Jeremy Bloxham FRS (born 1960) is a British geophysicist, and Mallinckrodt Professor of Geophysics, at Harvard University. He was Dean of Science.

== Education ==
He earned his Ph.D. from the University of Cambridge in 1986.
