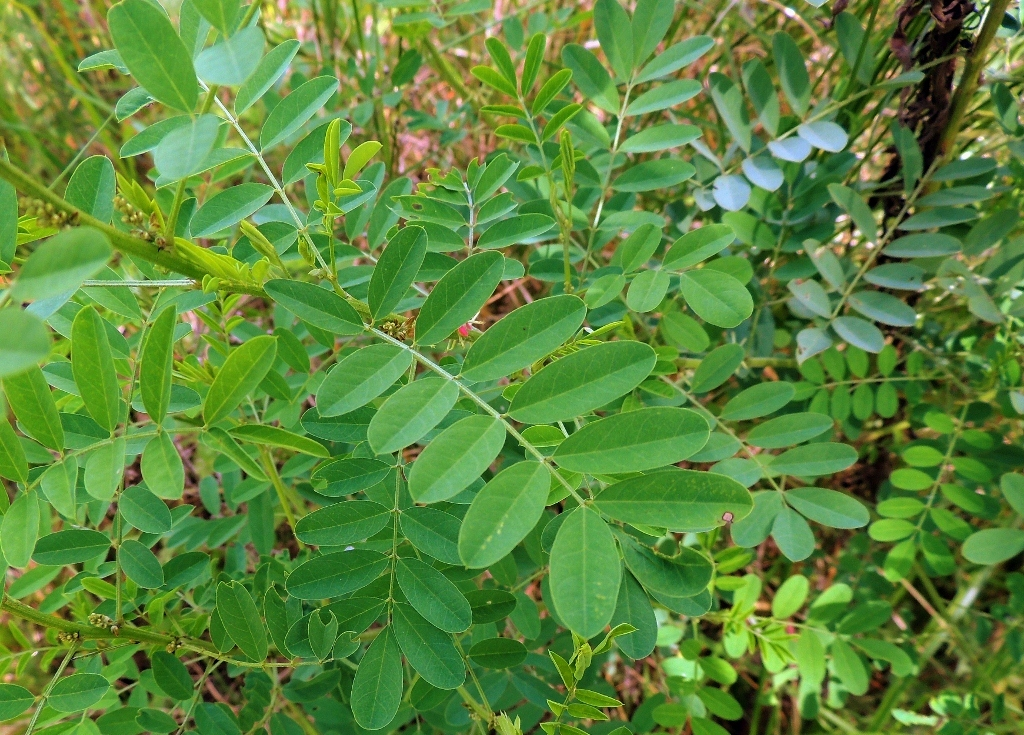

Scientific classification
- Kingdom: Plantae
- Clade: Tracheophytes
- Clade: Angiosperms
- Clade: Eudicots
- Clade: Rosids
- Order: Fabales
- Family: Fabaceae
- Subfamily: Faboideae
- Genus: Indigofera
- Species: I. arrecta

Binomial name
- Indigofera arrecta Hochst. ex A.Rich.

Synonyms
- List: Indigofera kisantuensis De Wild. & T.Durand; Indigofera madagascariensis Schrank ex Colla; Indigofera scopa De Wild. & T.Durand; Indigofera umbonata Welw. ex Baker

= Indigofera arrecta =

Species of flowering plant

External image
- Images at iNaturalist

Indigofera arrecta, variously called the Bengal, Java, or Natal indigo, is a species of flowering plant in the family Fabaceae. It is native to Sub‑Saharan Africa, the Arabian Peninsula, and Madagascar, and has been introduced to the Indian Subcontinent, Southeast Asia, some of the islands of Indonesia, the Philippines, and Queensland in Australia.

Today it is occasionally used as a green manure, but historically was a major source of Indigo dye, with 600,000 hectares (1,500,000 acres) under cultivation in India in 1896, declining to a few thousand hectares 60 years later.
