= Indian Agricultural Research Institute =

Agricultural institute in Delhi, India

- Abbreviation: IARI
- Formation: 1 April 1905; 121 years ago
- Purpose: Agricultural research and education
- Location: Pusa, Delhi
- Coordinates: 28.080°N 77.120°E
- Director: Cherukumalli Srinivasa Rao
- Parent organisation: ICAR
- Website: www.iari.res.in

The Indian Agricultural Research Institute (IARI), commonly known as the Pusa Institute, is India's national institute for agricultural research, education and extension. The name Pusa Institute is derived from the fact that the institute was originally located in Pusa, Bihar as the Imperial Institute of Agricultural Research in 1911. It was then renamed as the Imperial Agricultural Research Institute in 1919 and following a major earthquake in Pusa in 1934, it was relocated to Delhi in 1936. The current institute in Delhi is financed and administered by the Indian Council of Agricultural Research (ICAR). The IARI was responsible for the research leading to the "Green Revolution in India" of the 1970s. IARI ranked First among Agriculture and Allied Universities in the National Institutional Ranking Framework NIRF (India Rankings 2024).

== History ==
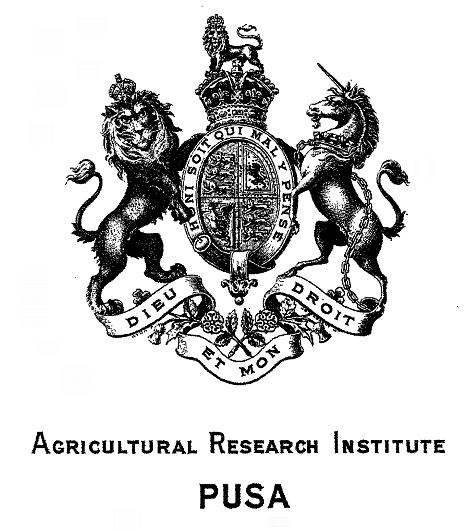
Logo of the Imperial Agricultural Research Institute

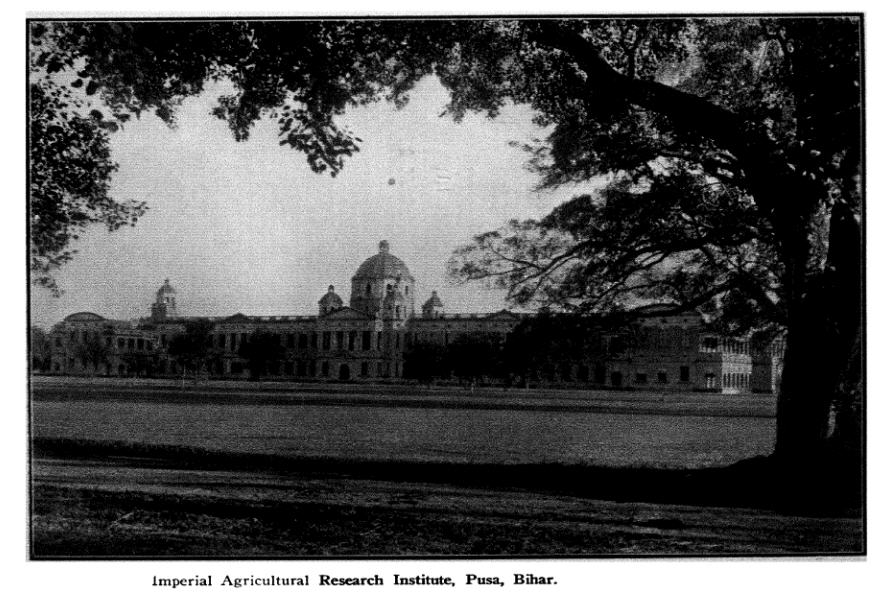
Imperial Agricultural Research Institute, at its original location Pusa, Bihar, circa 1927

The institute was established in 1905 at Pusa, Bihar, with financial assistance of Henry Phipps, Jr., an American philanthropist. Phipps was a family friend of Lady Curzon, who was a daughter of an American millionaire, and the wife of Lord Curzon, the Viceroy of India. Phipps stayed as a guest of the Curzons during his visit to India and left behind a donation of £30,000, which was used to establish the institute. He laid the foundation stone of the Agricultural Research Institute and college on 1 April 1905. The institute was originally called the Agricultural Research Institute (ARI). Its name was changed to the Imperial Institute of Agricultural Research in 1911, and to the Imperial Agricultural Research Institute in 1919. The choice of establishing it in Pusa in northern Bihar was the proximity to the indigo plantations which were in need of revival following the German synthesis of aniline in 1899. One of the first scientists to be deputed to the institute was the English chemist John Walter Leather who had worked from 1892 with the agricultural department in India. He moved to the institute in 1906.

However, the institute was damaged during the devastating Bihar earthquake of 15 January 1934. The Secretary of State approved the transfer in July, 1934. The Standing Finance Committee of the Union Assembly finally announced on 25 August 1934 in Shimla, the decision to shift the institute to Delhi at the approximate cost of ₹3.8 million (US$41,000). to a place that is now called Pusa in Delhi. The director B. Viswanath, a soil scientist was to be the first Indian to head the institute. The new campus at Delhi was inaugurated on 29 July 1936, while the new building of the Imperial Institute of Agricultural Research was inaugurated by the then Viceroy of India, Lord Linlithgow on 7 November 1936.

=== Post-independence: 1947–present ===
Directors
Bernard Coventry	1904–1916
James MacKenna	1916-1920
E.J. Butler	1920
William McRae	1929
W.H. Harrison	1929–1930
Bernard Keen	1930–1931
William McRae	1931–1934
F.J.F. Shaw	1934–1935
B. Viswanath	1935–1944
H.S. Pruthi	1944–1945
J.N. Mukherjee	1945–1950
B.P. Pal	1950–1965
A.B. Joshi	1965–1966
M.S. Swaminathan	1966–1972
A.B. Joshi	1972–1977
H.K. Jain	1977–1984
A.M. Michael	1986–1990
S.K. Sinha	1991–1994
R.B. Singh	1995–1999
Panjab Singh	2000–2002
S. Nagarajan	2002-2005
S. A. Patil	2006-2009
H. S. Gupta	2009-2014
Trilochan Mohapatra	2015-2016
Ashok Kumar Singh	2020-2025
Cherukumalli Srinivasa Rao	2025-

Post-independence, the institute was renamed the Indian Agricultural Research Institute, and in 1950 the Shimla sub-station of institute developed Rust-resistant varieties of wheat, including Pusa 718, 737, 745, and 760. In 1958, it was recognized as a "deemed university" under the UGC act of 1956 of Parliament and since then it has awarded MSc and PhD degrees. IARI has also started its undergraduate programme from 2022 to 2023.

What remained of the institute at the original location was downgraded to an agricultural research station until 1970, when the Government of Bihar established the Rajendra Agricultural University at the location.

== Campus ==
The campus is spread over 500 hectares (5.0 km^{2}), 8 km west of New Delhi Railway Station. This was initially outside Delhi, but over the decades the city has grown much beyond the campus. Indian Agricultural Statistics Research Institute is affiliated with and is located in the campus of the Indian Agricultural Research Institute.

== Schools at IARI ==
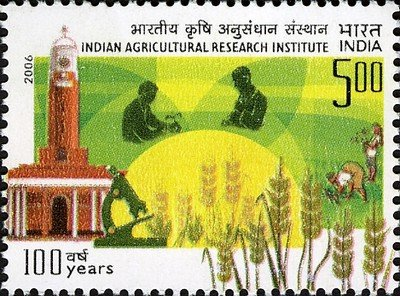
100 Years of Indian Agricultural Research Institute 2006 stamp

- School of Crop Improvement
- School of Plant Protection
- School of Basic Sciences
- School of Natural Resource Management
- School of Social Sciences
- School of Horticultural Science

== Notable alumni ==
- M. H. Ahmad
- Rajendra Singh Paroda
- Baldev Singh Dhillon
- Rattan Lal
- Anil Grover
- Govindachetty Rangaswami

== See also ==
- Pusa 1121 rice
- Van Vigyan Kendra Forest Science Centres
