= Andrew Bloxam (cricketer) =

English cricketer, botanist and law officer

Personal information
- Full name: Andrew Roby Bloxam
- Born: 3 May 1839; Twycross, Leicestershire, England
- Died: 28 June 1923 (aged 84); Christchurch, New Zealand
- Role: Batsman

Domestic team information
- Years: Team
- 1864/65: Canterbury
- Source: Cricinfo, 24 February 2022

Andrew Roby Bloxam (3 May 1839 – 28 June 1923) was an English cricketer, botanist and law officer. He played in one first-class match in New Zealand for Canterbury in 1864–65.

== Life and career ==
Born in Leicestershire, Bloxam was educated at Charterhouse School and Worcester College, Oxford. In 1863 he went to New Zealand. After some years as a private tutor in North Canterbury he worked as a clerk of the court at Kaniere on the West Coast of the South Island.

Bloxam played one cricket match for Canterbury against Otago in February 1865 as an opening batsman. He was Canterbury's highest scorer in the extremely low-scoring match with 10 and 18. Canterbury won by four wickets.

He lived in England between 1872 and 1879 before returning to New Zealand, where he was appointed deputy registrar of the Supreme Court in Christchurch. In 1881 he became registrar and sheriff, a position he held until he retired in 1907.

During his time in New Zealand, Bloxam was a collector of botanical specimens, particularly bryophytes and lichens. His specimens are held at Canterbury Museum, the Natural History Museum, London and at the herbarium at Kew Gardens.

Bloxam married Isabel Martin in Christchurch in June 1905. He died at their home in Christchurch in June 1923, aged 84.
