= Dr. Rajendra Prasad Central Agriculture University =

Central agricultural university in Samastipur, Bihar, India

Coordinates: 25.972861°N 85.693359°E

Dr. Rajendra Prasad Central Agricultural University
- Motto: tamaso mā jyotirgamaya
- Motto in English: Lead me from darkness to light
- Type: Public Agricultural University
- Established: 1905; 121 years ago
- Affiliations: UGC, ICAR, AIU
- Budget: ₹45 crore (US$4.7 million) (FY2022–23 est.)
- Chancellor: Dr. Prem Lal Gautam
- Vice-Chancellor: Dr. P. S. Pandey
- Visitor: President of India
- Location: Pusa, Samastipur, Bihar, India
- Campus: Rural
- Website: www.rpcau.ac.in

Dr. Rajendra Prasad Central Agricultural University, formerly known as Rajendra Agricultural University, is a public central agriculture university under the Department of Agricultural Research and Education of Ministry of Agriculture and Farmers Welfare and is recognised as Institute of National Importance by government of India. It is located in Pusa, Samastipur district, Bihar.

== History ==
Dr. Rajendra Prasad Central Agricultural University (previously, Rajendra Agricultural University) was originally established as India's first-ever Imperial Agriculture Research Institute.

The foundation stone of the Agricultural Research Institute and College was laid by Lord Curzon on 1 April 1905, with the financial assistance of Henry Phipps, Jr., an American philanthropist. Phipps was a family friend of Lady Curzon, the daughter of an American millionaire, and the wife of Lord Curzon, the Viceroy of India. In his speech, the viceroy had expressed his vision that the seed he was planting would soon blossom out, making Pusa the nucleus of agricultural activities, research and education which would not only benefit Bihar and Bengal but the whole of the country and would attract the best of talents from India and abroad. In a separate meeting with the Bihar Planters Association, he fervently hoped that the institute would be of immense service to them in their grave hour of crisis caused by the German Indigo scientist.

Lord Curzon left by the end of 1905, and Lord Minto was his successor. Till the last minute, he had seen through each and every detail of the Pusa project which virtually was his brainchild. Incidentally, one major issue on which he had not agreed was the architecture of the main building, its wings, vaults, and arches but finally, he gave his consent of course with a stint. Rightfully, Pusa received an imperial status in 1918, being renamed as the Imperial Agricultural Research Institute (IARI).

In 1934, after a major earthquake rocked Bihar and which severely damage the main buildings, the Imperial Institute was shifted to the new Pusa campus in New Delhi and that eventually became Indian Agricultural Research Institute. What remained was downgraded to an agricultural research station until 3 December 1970, when the government of Bihar established Rajendra Agricultural University.

On 11 May 2016, Parliament of India passed the Central University Bill. So, RAU, Pusa was upgraded to Central Agricultural University and named as Dr. Rajendra Prasad Central Agricultural University.

== Academics ==
There are five faculties in the university in the disciplines of Agriculture, Veterinary & Animal Sciences, Agricultural Engineering, Basic Sciences, Humanities & Home Science, besides the college of agriculture, fisheries and institute of dairy technology. The university offers six undergraduate degree programmes, 14 postgraduate programmes and 4 PhD programmes. It is also providing 2-year professional degree programs name MBA (Agribusiness Management) and MBA (Rural Management) for agricultural and allied sector graduates.

=== Departments of University ===
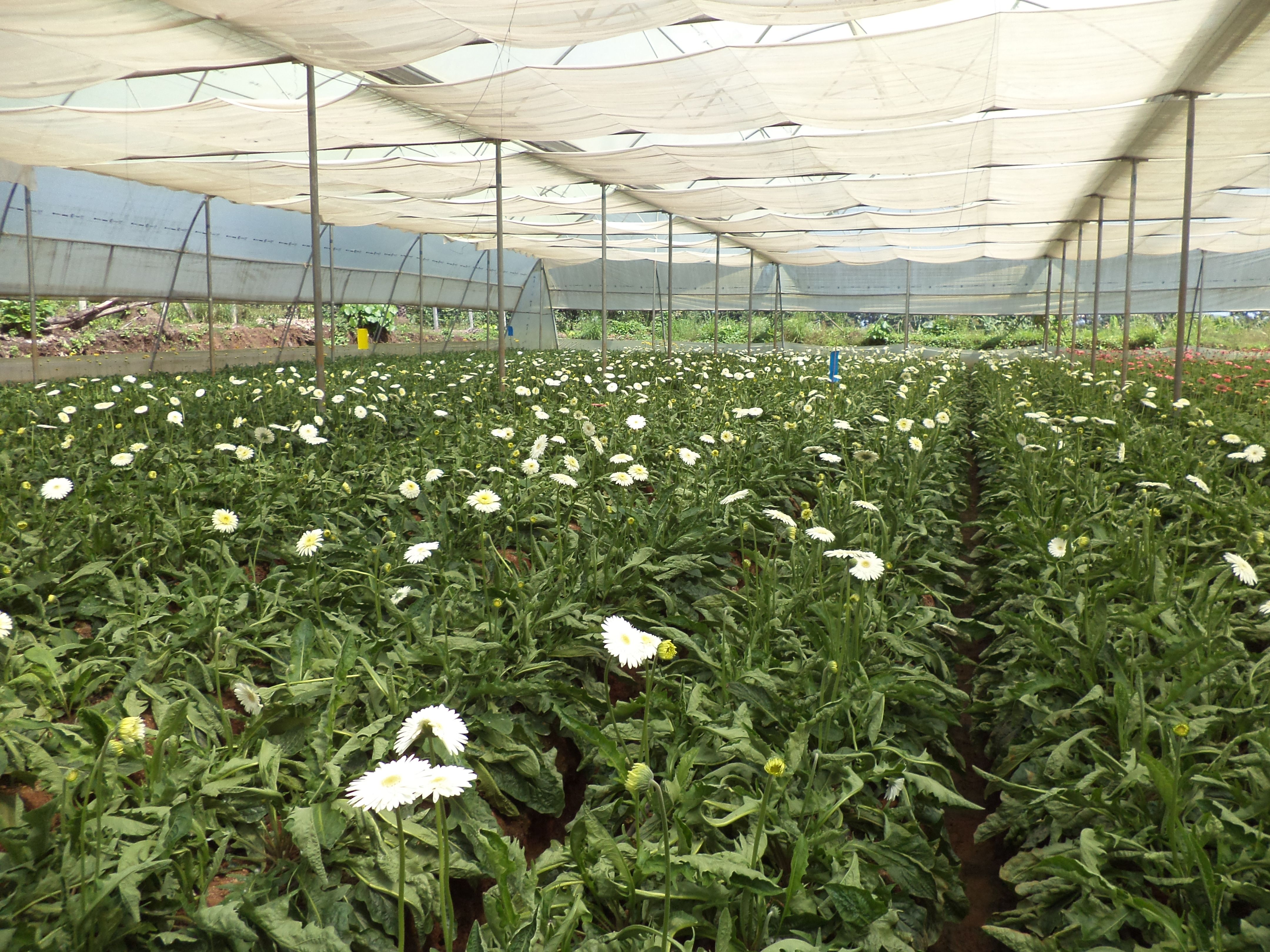
Gerbera Cultivation in Polyhouse, Dr. Rajendra Prasad Central Agriculture University

- Agronomy
- Horticulture
- Entomology
- Agricultural Economics
- Nematology
- Soil Science
- Extension Education
- Plant Breeding and Genetics
- Forestry
- Plant Pathology
- Agril Biotechnology and Molecular Biology
- Microbiology
- Soil and Water Engineering
- Farm Machinery & Power
- Processing & Food Engineering
- Agribusiness Management
- Rural Management

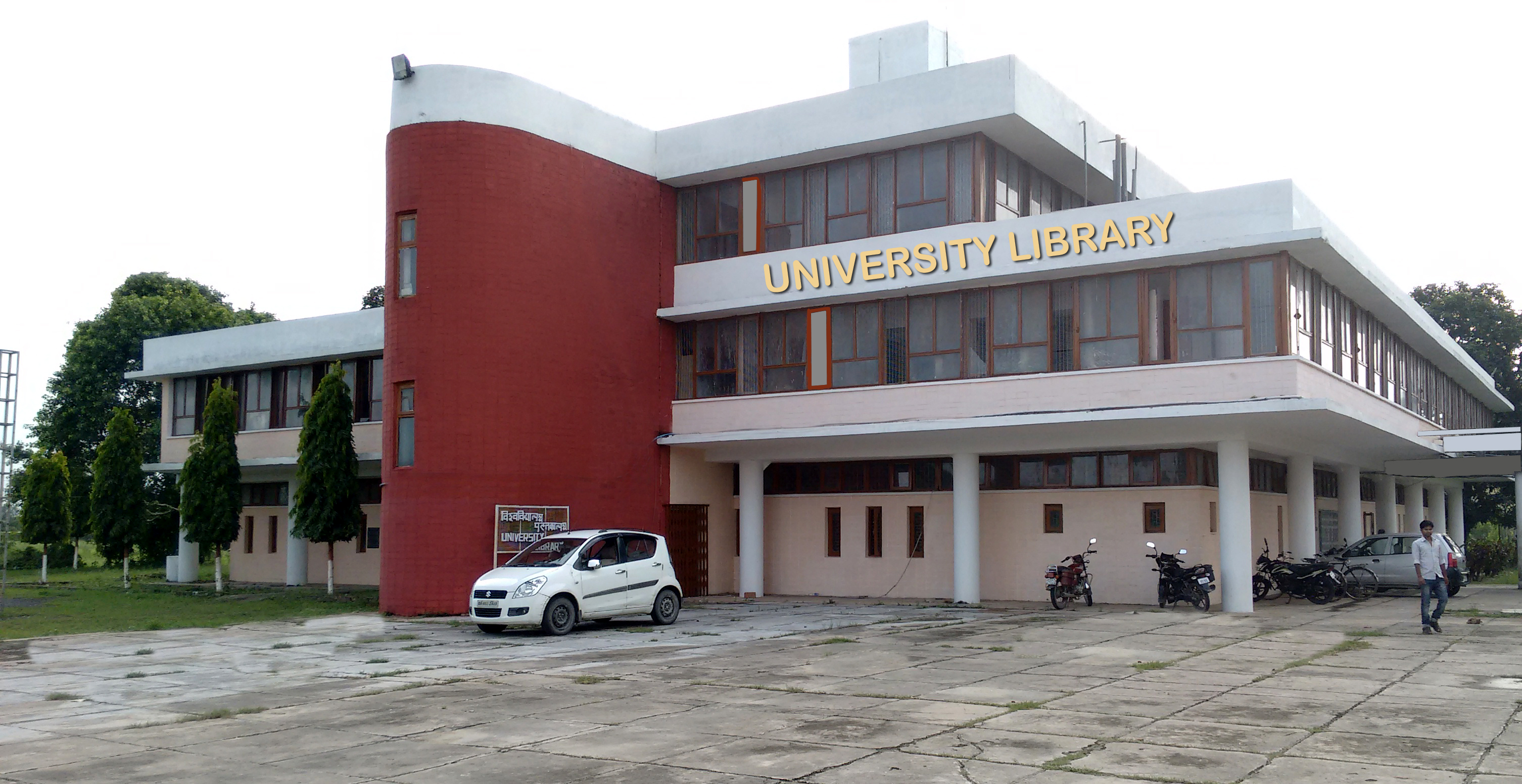
University Library, established in the year 1978 at Tirhut College of Agriculture, Dholi, was shifted to present building at Pusa in 1981.

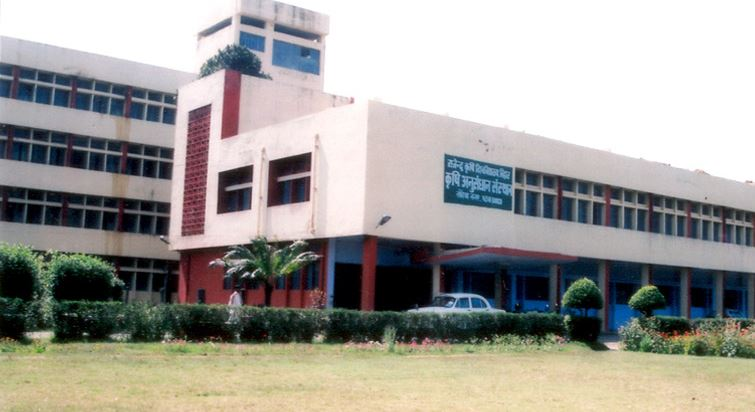
Agricultural Research Institute, Dr. Rajendra Prasad Central Agriculture University

=== Constituent Colleges of University ===
- College of Agricultural Engineering and Technology
- Trihut College of Agriculture
- College of Fisheries
- College of Community Science
- College of Basic Sciences & Humanities
- Post Graduate College of Agriculture
- School of Agribusiness & Rural Management
- Pt. Deen Dayal Upadhyay College of Horticulture Forestry

== Rankings ==
The university was ranked 29th in India by the National Institutional Ranking Framework (NIRF) in the agriculture ranking in 2024.
