= Foundation Course for Agricultural Research Service =

Indian research institute

Foundation Course for Agricultural Research Services is an introductory course designed for the fresh recruits to the various agricultural services in India. The Foundation Course, (also called FOCARS) is designed for the newly recruited entry level scientists to the Agricultural Research Service of the ICAR. The course aims at providing exposure to the trainees on the concepts and principles of project management with special emphasis on project formulation and implementation. It also includes capsules in related areas on human resources development, and information and communication management. Around 6000 scientists have been trained by NAARM, Hyderabad adding great assets to National Service.

== The path to the Foundation Courses ==
Candidates to the Foundation Course are invited for the course by the National Academy of Agricultural Research Management (NAARM) at Hyderabad only after they have cleared the rigorous three-stage (Prelims, Mains and Interview) Agricultural Research Services Exam, conducted by the Agricultural Scientists Recruitment Board.

The actual course is a "six month induction training". As of 2025, there have been 115 sessions.
