= Frederick John Freshwater Shaw =

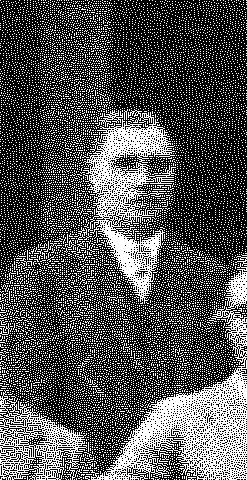
F.J.F. Shaw at a meeting in Pusa 1929.

Frederick John Freshwater Shaw (16 December 1885 - 29 July 1936) was a British botanist and mycologist who worked briefly in India where he died of heat stroke during a trip to Agra.

He joined as an Imperial Mycologist in 1910 and studied plant pathology at Pusa and at Coimbatore. He also served as the Imperial Economic Botanist and was made a director of the Imperial Institute of Agricultural Research in 1934, a point when the institute was shifted from Bihar to Delhi after an earthquake.

He described several species of fungi and worked on plant anatomy as well as research techniques including statistics. Among his works was a "A Handbook of Statistics For Use in Plant Breeding And Agricultural Problems" (1936).
