= William McRae (botanist) =

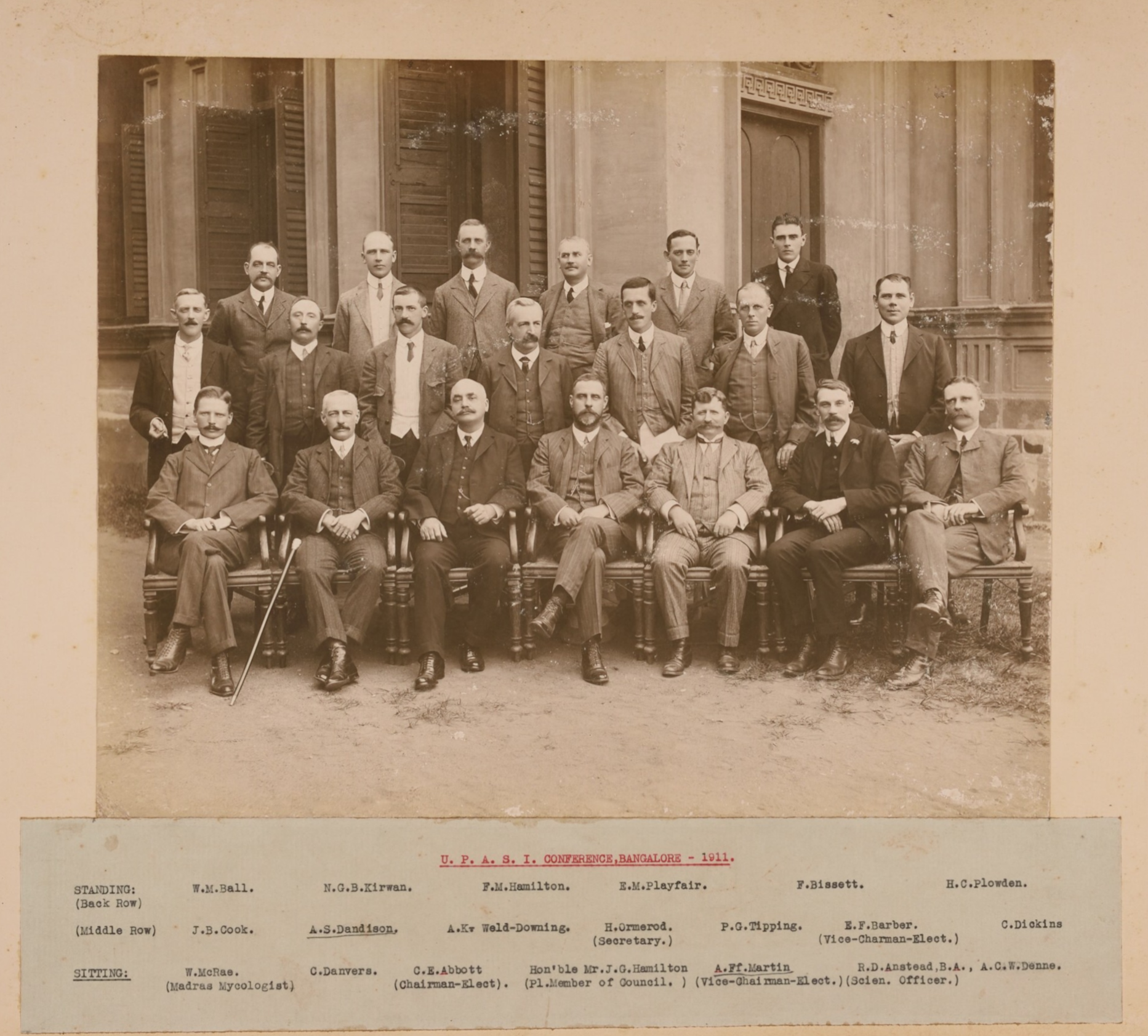
McRae in 1911, Bangalore, India (seated leftmost)

William McRae FRSE CIE (26 May 1878 – 8 July 1952) was a Scottish botanist specialising in fungi and lichens. He is largely remembered for his extensive work in India.

== Life ==
He was born on 26 May 1878 to his mother Margaret Younie and father William McRae. His family lived at 90 Princes Street in Edinburgh. He was educated at James Gillespie's High School in Edinburgh, then studied science at the University of Edinburgh before studying as a postgraduate at the Ludwig-Maximilians-Universität München in Germany.

He worked as a Demonstrator in the Royal College of Science, London, then in 1908 moved to India. His first job was with the Indian Agricultural Service, and then he moved to agricultural department in Madras with the title of Government Mycologist. He later became Director of the Institute.

In 1934, he was awarded a Commander of the Order of the Indian Empire (CIE). In 1936, he was elected a Fellow of the Royal Society of Edinburgh. His proposers were Malcolm Wilson, Sir William Wright Smith, Robert Campbell, and John Macqueen Cowan.

He retired to Edinburgh with his wife and family and died there on 8 July 1952.
