= William Popplewell Bloxam =

English chemist

William Popplewell Bloxam (9 January 1860 – 26 December 1913) was an English chemist known for his work on dyes, particularly indigo in India and at the laboratory of A. G. Perkin. He was nephew of the chemist Charles Loudon Bloxam.

Bloxam was born on Mount Street, Grosvenor Square to surgeon William Bloxam and Emma Caroline Kite. He went to school at Northampton Grammar School and then King's College School. He was initially interested in studying law but the death of his father made him study chemistry from his uncle Charles Bloxam at King's College and became an assistant to Heinrich Debus (1824–1915) studying sulphur compounds and later under Vivian Lewes, both at the Royal Naval College, Greenwich. In 1901 he applied for a position at the Madras Presidency College but this was cancelled when the former holder of the position returned from sick leave. He then moved to Bihar to work on the chemistry of indigo production and the extraction of indigotin.

He returned to England in 1904 and worked at the Clothworkers' Research Laboratory at the University of Leeds under A.G. Perkin. He suffered from a stroke and died at Guy's Hospital.
