= National Academy of Agricultural Research Management =

Indian service training organisation

- Type: Natural Resource Service Training Institute
- Established: 1976
- Academic affiliations: ICAR
- Director: Ch. Srinivasa Rao, ARS
- Location: Acharya N. G. Ranga Agricultural University, Rajendranagar mandal, Hyderabad, Telangana, 500030, India; 17.3132731°N 78.4114496°E
- Campus: Urban
- Website: naarm.org.in
- Location within Telangana Location within India

The National Academy of Agricultural Research Management is a national-level service training institute for ARS cadre located in Hyderabad, Telangana, India.

== History ==
It was established by the Indian Council of Agricultural Research (ICAR) in 1976, to address issues related to agricultural research, training and development and education management, in India. In the initial years, the academy primarily imparted foundation training to the new entrants of the Agricultural Research Service of the Indian Council of Agricultural Research.

Subsequently, its role expanded to include research, capacity building of senior professionals of national and international NARS (National Agricultural Research Station) in agricultural research and education management, and policy and consultancy support to NARS. The academy also renders services for building intellectual property (IP) portfolios like patents and geographical indications to various stakeholders including farmers and scientists.

== Functional Areas/ Divisions of Management ==
There are six divisions within the academy: Agribusiness Management, Education Systems Management, Extension Systems Management, Human Resources Management, Information and Communication Management, and Research Systems Management.

== Former Directors ==
S.no	Name of the Director	On Transfer/Regular	From	To
1.	Dr. N.K.Anantha Rao (Officer on Special Duty)	Regular	01.08.1976	31.03.1978
2.	Dr. G.Ranga Swamy	Regular	01.04.1978	04.10.1979
3.	Dr. K.V.Raman	Regular	24.03.1984	31.01.1992
4.	Dr. C.Prasad	On Transfer	01.06.1993	24.02.1995
5.	Dr. Jagdeesh C.Kalla	Regular	25.02.1995	30.11.1996
6.	Dr. J.C.Katyal	Regular	20.02.1997	15.01.2002
7.	Dr. B.N.Mathur	On Transfer	01.11.2002	10.02.2004
8.	Dr. S.Prakash Tiwari	Regular	03.05.2005	12.07.2006
9.	Dr. S.M.Ilyas	Regular	08.02.2007	31.07.2009
10.	Dr. P.K.Joshi	Regular	19.09.2009	31.03.2011
11.	Dr. S.L.Goswami	Regular	21.12.2011	30.06.2014
12.	Dr. D.Rama Rao	Regular	01.07.2014	30.09.2016
13.	Dr. Ch. Srinivasa Rao	Regular	28.04.2017	Till Date

== See also ==
- Genome Valley
- Education in India
- Literacy in India
- List of institutions of higher education in Telangana
