= Geoff Evans =

Geoff or Geoffrey Evans may refer to:

- Geoff Evans (cricketer) (1939–2016), English cricketer
- Geoff Evans (rugby union, born 1942), former Wales international rugby union player
- Geoff Evans (rugby union, born 1950), former England international rugby union player
- Geoff Evans (political scientist), British political scientist
- Geoffrey Evans (botanist) (1883–1963), British botanist
- Geoffrey Charles Evans (1901–1987), British Indian Army general
- Geoffrey Evans (c. 1943–2012), serial killer
- Geoffrey Evans (priest) (1934–2015), Church of England archdeacon

== See also ==
- Jeffrey Evans (disambiguation)
