= Kettlewell (surname) =

Kettlewell is a surname. Notable people with the surname include:

- Bernard Kettlewell (1907–1979), British physician and geneticist
- Danielle Kettlewell (born 1992), Australian synchronised swimmer
- John Kettlewell (1653–1695), English clergyman
- Henry Kettlewell (1876–1963), British cricketer
- Professor Kettlewell, a villain in the Doctor Who television serial Robot
- Richard Wildman Kettlewell (1910-1994), official in Nyasaland
- Roger Kettlewell (born 1945), Canadian football player
- Ruth Kettlewell (1913–2007), British actress
- Stuart Kettlewell (b. 1984), Scottish footballer
