= Yarnkothrips =

Scientific classification
- Kingdom: Animalia
- Phylum: Arthropoda
- Class: Insecta
- Order: Thysanoptera
- Family: Phlaeothripidae
- Genus: Yarnkothrips; Mound & Walker, 1986

Genus of thrips

Yarnkothrips is a genus of thrips in the family Phlaeothripidae.

== Species ==
- Yarnkothrips kolourus
