= Senithrips =

Scientific classification
- Kingdom: Animalia
- Phylum: Arthropoda
- Class: Insecta
- Order: Thysanoptera
- Family: Phlaeothripidae
- Genus: Senithrips; Mound & Minaei, 2006

Genus of thrips

Senithrips is a genus of thrips in the family Phlaeothripidae, found in Western Australia, and first described by Laurence Mound and Kambiz Minaei in 2006. The genus contains just one species, Senithrips psomus.

Senithrips psomus is a fungus feeding thrips, whose holotype was collected on Barrow Island, Western Australia in Triodia angusta grassland.
