= Holothrips australis =

Scientific classification
- Kingdom: Animalia
- Phylum: Arthropoda
- Class: Insecta
- Order: Thysanoptera
- Family: Phlaeothripidae
- Genus: Holothrips
- Species: H. australis

Binomial name
- Holothrips australis (Mound, 1974)

Synonyms
- Adelothrips australis Mound, 1974

Species of thrips

Holothrips australis is a species of thrips in the Phlaeothripinae subfamily, first described in 1974 by Laurence Mound as Adelothrips australis. This thrips is found in the Australian Capital Territory and South Australia.

This thrips, like others of its genus, is fungus feeding and not usually found in large colonies.
