= Corroboreethrips =

Scientific classification
- Kingdom: Animalia
- Phylum: Arthropoda
- Class: Insecta
- Order: Thysanoptera
- Family: Phlaeothripidae
- Genus: Corroboreethrips; Mound & Moritz, 2000

Genus of thrips

Corroboreethrips is a genus of thrips in the family Phlaeothripidae.

== Species ==
- Corroboreethrips kallus
- Corroboreethrips siagonus
- Corroboreethrips stomius
- Corroboreethrips subsolanus
- Corroboreethrips suspectus
