= Xaniothrips =

Scientific classification
- Kingdom: Animalia
- Phylum: Arthropoda
- Clade: Pancrustacea
- Class: Insecta
- Order: Thysanoptera
- Family: Phlaeothripidae
- Genus: Xaniothrips; Mound, 1971

Type species
- Xaniothrips xantes Mound, 1971

Genus of thrips

Xaniothrips is a genus of thrips in the family Phlaeothripidae, which was first described by Laurence Mound in 1971. The type species is Xaniothrips xantes.

Members of this genus are found only in Australia, (in all mainland states and territories with the exception of Victoria) in semi-arid zones, where they are kleptoparasites on Acacias. That is, they attack and steal the homes (galls) in Acacias created by other thrips species and continue to parasitise the acacia. Adults use their abdomens to do this.

== Species ==
- Xaniothrips eremus
- Xaniothrips foederatus
- Xaniothrips leukandrus
- Xaniothrips mulga
- Xaniothrips rhodopus
- Xaniothrips xantes
- Xaniothrips zophus
