= Crespithrips =

Scientific classification
- Kingdom: Animalia
- Phylum: Arthropoda
- Class: Insecta
- Order: Thysanoptera
- Family: Phlaeothripidae
- Genus: Crespithrips; Mound & Morris, 2000

Genus of thrips

Crespithrips is a genus of thrips in the family Phlaeothripidae, which was first described by Laurence Alfred Mound and David C. Morris in 2000. The type species is Crespithrips enigmaticus.

Species of the genus are found in Queensland, the Northern Territory and Western Australia.

== Species ==
- Crespithrips enigmaticus
- Crespithrips hesperus
