= Holothrips eurytis =

Scientific classification
- Kingdom: Animalia
- Phylum: Arthropoda
- Class: Insecta
- Order: Thysanoptera
- Family: Phlaeothripidae
- Genus: Holothrips
- Species: H. eurytis

Binomial name
- Holothrips eurytis Mound & Tree, 2014

Species of thrips

Holothrips eurytis is a species of thrips in the Phlaeothripinae subfamily, first described in 2014 by Laurence Mound and Desley Tree. This species is found in New South Wales, the ACT and Queensland, and is endemic to Australia

This thrips, like others of its genus, is fungus feeding and not usually found in large colonies.
