= Akainothrips =

Scientific classification
- Kingdom: Animalia
- Phylum: Arthropoda
- Class: Insecta
- Order: Thysanoptera
- Family: Phlaeothripidae
- Genus: Akainothrips; Mound, 1971

Type species
- Akainothrips citritarsus (Girault, 1828)

Genus of thrips

Akainothrips is a genus of thrips in the family Phlaeothripidae, first described by Laurence Mound in 1971. The type species is Akainothrips citritarsus (Girault, 1828).

The 34 species of this genus are found only in Australia, in all mainland states and territories.

They live and breed in the galls created by other Phlaeothripinae species on the phyllodes of Acacia species.

== Species ==
- Akainothrips asketus
- Akainothrips bipictus
- Akainothrips calcica
- Akainothrips carnei
- Akainothrips ciliatus
- Akainothrips citritarsus
- Akainothrips crambus
- Akainothrips dalbyensis
- Akainothrips dubitalis
- Akainothrips exourus
- Akainothrips festus
- Akainothrips francisi
- Akainothrips galeus
- Akainothrips gremius
- Akainothrips herbae
- Akainothrips inionis
- Akainothrips ireneae
- Akainothrips iskae
- Akainothrips juliae
- Akainothrips magnetis
- Akainothrips monaro
- Akainothrips notius
- Akainothrips nyngani
- Akainothrips ochromelus
- Akainothrips papyris
- Akainothrips peronatus
- Akainothrips polysetulus
- Akainothrips quintarius
- Akainothrips roxbyi
- Akainothrips shirleyi
- Akainothrips tathrae
- Akainothrips tessarus
- Akainothrips tosofagi
- Akainothrips uncus
