= Brakothrips =

Scientific classification
- Kingdom: Animalia
- Phylum: Arthropoda
- Class: Insecta
- Order: Thysanoptera
- Family: Phlaeothripidae
- Genus: Brakothrips; Crespi, Morris & Mound, 2004

Type species
- Brakothrips gillesi Crespi, Morris & Mound, 2004

Genus of thrips

Brakothrips is a genus of thrips in the family Phlaeothripidae, first described by Crespi, Morris and Mound in 2004. The type species is Brakothrips gillesi. Insects in this genus are found only in Australia, living under the splitting bark of young branches of Acacias (but one species utilises a similar habitat in Eucalyptus cinerea).

== Species ==
- Brakothrips bullus
- Brakothrips gillesi
- Brakothrips maafi
- Brakothrips meandarra
- Brakothrips pilbara
- Brakothrips sculptilis
- Brakothrips stenos
