= Zemiathrips =

Scientific classification
- Kingdom: Animalia
- Phylum: Arthropoda
- Class: Insecta
- Order: Thysanoptera
- Family: Phlaeothripidae
- Genus: Zemiathrips; Mound, 2002

Genus of thrips

Zemiathrips is a genus of thrips in the family Phlaeothripidae.

== Species ==
- Zemiathrips anatolis
- Zemiathrips biseta
- Zemiathrips greensladeae
- Zemiathrips triseta
- Zemiathrips uptoni
