= Adurothrips =

Scientific classification
- Kingdom: Animalia
- Phylum: Arthropoda
- Class: Insecta
- Order: Thysanoptera
- Family: Phlaeothripidae
- Genus: Adurothrips; Mound, 1994

Genus of thrips

Adurothrips is a genus of thrips in the family Phlaeothripidae, first described by Laurence Mound in 1994. There is just one species in this genus: Adurothrips atopus. The species is wingless and breeds in leaf litter in New South Wales, Queensland and South Australia.
