= Holothrips circulus =

Scientific classification
- Kingdom: Animalia
- Phylum: Arthropoda
- Class: Insecta
- Order: Thysanoptera
- Family: Phlaeothripidae
- Genus: Holothrips
- Species: H. circulus

Binomial name
- Holothrips circulus Mound & Tree, 2014

Species of thrips

Holothrips circulus is a species of thrips in the Phlaeothripinae subfamily, first described in 2014 by Laurence Mound and Desley Tree, known only from its type locality, Springbrook, Queensland.

This thrips, like others of its genus, is fungus feeding and not usually found in large colonies.
