= Domeothrips =

Scientific classification
- Kingdom: Animalia
- Phylum: Arthropoda
- Class: Insecta
- Order: Thysanoptera
- Family: Phlaeothripidae
- Genus: Domeothrips; Morris & Mound, 2004

Genus of thrips

Domeothrips is a genus of thrips in the family Phlaeothripidae.

== Species ==
- Domeothrips aruena
- Domeothrips catenulatae
- Domeothrips distinctus
- Domeothrips newmani
- Domeothrips ophthalmia
