= Iotatubothrips =

Scientific classification
- Kingdom: Animalia
- Phylum: Arthropoda
- Class: Insecta
- Order: Thysanoptera
- Family: Phlaeothripidae
- Subfamily: Phlaeothripinae
- Genus: Iotatubothrips; Mound & Crespi, 1992

Type species
- Iotatubothrips crozieri

Genus of thrips

Iotatubothrips is a genus of thrips in the family Phlaeothripidae. There are three described species in Iotatubothrips, found in Australia.

== Species ==
These three species belong to the genus Iotatubothrips:

- Iotatubothrips crozieri Mound & Crespi, 1992
- Iotatubothrips daguilari Mound, Tree & Wells, 2022
- Iotatubothrips kranzae Mound, Crespi & Tucker, 1998
