= Holothrips bunyai =

Scientific classification
- Kingdom: Animalia
- Phylum: Arthropoda
- Class: Insecta
- Order: Thysanoptera
- Family: Phlaeothripidae
- Genus: Holothrips
- Species: H. bunyai

Binomial name
- Holothrips bunyai Mound & Tree, 2014

Species of thrips

Holothrips bunyai is a species of thrips in the Phlaeothripinae subfamily, first described in 2014 by Laurence Mound and Desley Tree, known only from the Bunya Mountains.

This thrips, like others of its genus, is fungus feeding and not usually found in large colonies.
