= Deplorothrips =

Scientific classification
- Kingdom: Animalia
- Phylum: Arthropoda
- Class: Insecta
- Order: Thysanoptera
- Family: Phlaeothripidae
- Genus: Deplorothrips; Mound & Walker, 1986

Genus of thrips

Deplorothrips is a genus of thrips in the family Phlaeothripidae.

== Species ==
- Deplorothrips acutus
- Deplorothrips armatus
- Deplorothrips bassus
- Deplorothrips belliatus
- Deplorothrips capitalis
- Deplorothrips cephalicus
- Deplorothrips chydaeus
- Deplorothrips deuae
- Deplorothrips diaphorus
- Deplorothrips howei
- Deplorothrips makrus
- Deplorothrips medius
- Deplorothrips minaei
- Deplorothrips mongai
- Deplorothrips norfuki
- Deplorothrips opacus
- Deplorothrips paspalus
- Deplorothrips regina
- Deplorothrips retis
- Deplorothrips setiger
- Deplorothrips similis
- Deplorothrips villosus
- Deplorothrips virgulatus
