= Akthethrips =

Scientific classification
- Kingdom: Animalia
- Phylum: Arthropoda
- Class: Insecta
- Order: Thysanoptera
- Family: Phlaeothripidae
- Genus: Akthethrips; Mound, 1970

Type species
- Akthethrips strobus Mound, 1970

Genus of thrips

Akthethrips is a genus of thrips in the family Phlaeothripidae, first described by Laurence Mound in 1970. There is just one species in this genus, Akthethrips strobus, which is found in New South Wales and South Australia, living on the foliage of Casuarina glauca, and Casuarina pauper.

It is suggested that the elongate stylets of this species (and genus) "are adapted to feeding on the chlorophyllous tissue of Casuarina(s)"
