= Andrethrips =

Scientific classification
- Kingdom: Animalia
- Phylum: Arthropoda
- Class: Insecta
- Order: Thysanoptera
- Family: Phlaeothripidae
- Genus: Andrethrips; Mound, 1974

Type species
- Andrethrips floydi Mound, 1974

Genus of thrips

Andrethrips is a genus of thrips in the family Phlaeothripidae, first described by Laurence Mound in 1974. The type species, Andrethrips floydi, is found in Malaysia on dead wood.

== Species ==
- Andrethrips floydi
- Andrethrips insularis
