= Holothrips federicae =

Scientific classification
- Kingdom: Animalia
- Phylum: Arthropoda
- Class: Insecta
- Order: Thysanoptera
- Family: Phlaeothripidae
- Genus: Holothrips
- Species: H. federicae

Binomial name
- Holothrips federicae Mound & Tree, 2014

Species of thrips

Holothrips federicae is a species of thrips in the Phlaeothripinae subfamily, first described in 2014 by Laurence Mound and Desley Tree. This thrips is found in both New South Wales and Queensland, and is endemic to Australia.

This thrips, like others of its genus, is fungus feeding and not usually found in large colonies.
