= Holothrips notialis =

Scientific classification
- Kingdom: Animalia
- Phylum: Arthropoda
- Class: Insecta
- Order: Thysanoptera
- Family: Phlaeothripidae
- Genus: Holothrips
- Species: H. notialis

Binomial name
- Holothrips notialis Mound & Tree, 2014

Species of thrips

Holothrips notialis is a species of thrips in the Phlaeothripinae subfamily, first described in 2014 by Laurence Mound and Desley Tree. This thrips is found in the Australian Capital Territory, New South Wales, South Australia, Tasmania, and Victoria, and is endemic to Australia.

This thrips, like others of its genus, is fungus feeding and not usually found in large colonies.
