= Csirothrips =

Scientific classification
- Kingdom: Animalia
- Phylum: Arthropoda
- Class: Insecta
- Order: Thysanoptera
- Family: Phlaeothripidae
- Genus: Csirothrips; Mound, 1971

Genus of thrips

Csirothrips is a genus of thrips in the family Phlaeothripidae.

== Species ==
- Csirothrips watsoni
