= 1956 Nyasaland general election =

General elections were held for the first time in Nyasaland on 15 March 1956.

== Background ==
Although the Legislative Council was created in 1907, its membership had previously been limited to government officials and members appointed by the Governor. The first public elections held in Nyasaland were for the Legislative Assembly of the Federation of Rhodesia and Nyasaland in 1953, although only 1,058 residents were eligible to vote.

== Electoral system ==
Constitutional reforms in 1955 introduced two forms of elected members to the Legislative Council. The Nyasaland Ordinance was passed on 6 September 1955 by the Council, setting out the electoral system. The new Council consisted of eleven officials, five indirectly-elected seats for Africans and six elected seats for non-Africans. A proposal to have a reserved seat for the Asian population was rejected under pressure from the federal government.

The five African members were elected by the three African Provincial Councils; the Central and Southern Province Councils elected two members each, whilst the Northern Province Council elected one.

As with the 1953 federal elections, the non-African franchise was limited to British subject who were at least 21 years old, earned at least £200 a year or occupied property worth £250, and who had an "adequate" knowledge of English, being able to complete their registration form without assistance. The requirement to be a British subject disqualified the vast majority of the Asian and Coloured population; although at the time of the elections the European population was 6,732 and the Asian population was 8,504, only 338 Asians were able to register to vote, compared with 1,866 Europeans. Just six Coloureds also registered, giving a total of 2,210 registered voters. The six non-African members were elected from six single-member constituencies:

Constituency	Registered voters
Blantyre West	344
Cholo–Mlanje	377
Limbe–Blantyre	342
North Nyasa	378
Shire Highlands	367
South Nyasa	402
Total	2,210
Source: Leys

== Campaign ==
=== African seats ===
All of the African seats were contested. In Central Province seven candidates ran, including Aleke Banda, a former Secretary-General of the Nyasaland African Congress (NAC), James Ralph Nthinda Chinyama, a former President-General of the NAC and Herbert Gondwe, who had been a Member of the Legislative Council (MLC) since 1953. The Northern Province seat was contested by four candidates, including Kaunda, the Vice President General of the NAC, and Alexander Muwamba, who had been an MLC since 1948 . The Southern Province seats were contested by six candidates, including Stevenson Kumakanga, an MLC since 1954 and Charles Matinga, leader of the Nyasaland Progressive Association. Aside from Matinga and Chief Lundu (who ran in the Southern Province), all African candidates were from the NAC.

=== Non-African seats ===
Only four of the six non-African seats were contested, with two Asians amongst the 13 candidates. Cholo–Mlanje was left uncontested after the two potential rivals to F G Collins were scared off by his energetic campaigning, whilst A C W Dixon was unopposed in Limbe–Blantyre after receiving the backing of Sattar Sacranie, the Indian MLC.

Although Sacranie had also agreed to support M H Howard in the Blantyre West constituency, delays in confirming Howard's candidature led to Indian demands to have a candidate of their own. Following a public meeting, N M Survana was nominated to stand. At the same time, another Indian candidate V A Sarani announced he would contest the Shire Highlands seat. However, when Howard's candidature was confirmed, the Asian Convention asked Sarani to contest South Nyasa instead, so that Survana could run in Shire Highlands. Although he initially agreed, Sarani later opted to stand in Blantyre West against Howard.

Three candidates ran under the Nyasaland Association banner; L F Hunt in North Nyasa (an incumbent MLC), L A Little in Shire Highlands and Michael Hill Blackwood (another MLC) in Blantyre West. The Association campaigned on a platform to "protect and foster the interests of Europeans in Nyasaland and to further the economic development of the territory". It also called for the constitution to remain unchanged for a year after the Federation of Rhodesia and Nyasaland was finalised, as well as seeking further land for European settlement.

In North Nyasa Hunt ran against V G Milward, chairman of Lilongwe Town Council. South Nyasa was contested by W G Widdas, a former (1949–52) MLC and the only woman to run in the election.

== Results ==
=== African seats ===
In the African seats, all five elected candidates were supporters of the NAC. Dunstan Chijozi was elected in Central Province by lot after receiving the same number of votes as Richard Katengeza. The three members of the previous sitting of the Legislative Council received just six of the 119 votes cast between them, and were not re-elected.

Constituency	Candidate	Votes	%	Notes
Central Province	James Ralph Nthinda Chinyama			Elected
Central Province	Dunstan Chijozi			Elected by lots
Central Province	Richard Katengeza			
Central Province	Aleke Banda			
Central Province	Herbert Gondwe			
Central Province	Nthaba			
Central Province	Phiri			
Northern Province	Kanyama Chiume	16	72.7	Elected
Northern Province	Wedson Kaunda	6	27.3	
Northern Province	Alexander Muwamba	6	27.3	
Northern Province	Ngosi	6	27.3	
Southern Province	Henry Masauko Blasius Chipembere	21	43.8	Elected
Southern Province	Nophas Dinneck Kwenje	27	56.3	Elected
Southern Province	Thamar Dillon Thomas Banda	27	56.3	
Southern Province	Stevenson Kumakanga	27	56.3	
Southern Province	Chief Lundu	27	56.3	
Southern Province	Charles Matinga	27	56.3	
Source: Leys, McCracken

=== Non-African seats ===
Constituency	Candidate	Votes	%	Notes
Blantyre West	Michael Hill Blackwood	144	50.88	Elected
Blantyre West	P Howard	70	24.73	
Blantyre West	E C Peterkins	56	19.79	
Blantyre West	V A Sarani	13	4.59	
Cholo–Mlanje	F G Collins	Unopposed		Elected
Limbe–Blantyre	A C W Dixon	Unopposed		Elected
North Nyasa	V G Milward	140	59.07	Elected
North Nyasa	L F Hunt	97	40.93	
Shire Highlands	L A Little	173	60.08	Elected
Shire Highlands	N M Survana	61	21.18	
Shire Highlands	H G Dawes	54	18.75	
South Nyasa	H Coombes	164	70.09	Elected
South Nyasa	Marjorie Widdas	70	29.91	
Invalid/blank votes			–	
Total		1,042	100	
Registered voters/turnout		1,491		
Source: Laws

== Aftermath ==
The first sitting of the newly elected Legislative Council was on 14 May.
