= Domatiathrips =

Scientific classification
- Kingdom: Animalia
- Phylum: Arthropoda
- Class: Insecta
- Order: Thysanoptera
- Family: Phlaeothripidae
- Genus: Domatiathrips; Mound, 1993

Genus of thrips

Domatiathrips is a genus of thrips in the family Phlaeothripidae.

== Species ==
- Domatiathrips cunninghamii
