= Richard Wildman Kettlewell =

British colonial officer (1910–1994)

Richard Wildman Kettlewell (1910–1994) was a colonial agricultural officer who spent all his colonial career in Nyasaland (present day Malawi) apart from three years of wartime army service. He became Director of Agriculture in 1951 and Secretary for National Resources then Minister of Lands and Surveys between 1960 and 1962. He was influential in the late colonial administration of Nyasaland, and responsible for the introduction of several controversial agricultural and land-use policies that were highly unpopular with African farmers and which he accepted had promoted nationalist sentiments in the protectorate. After leaving Nyasaland in 1962 shortly before its independence, he settled in the Cotswolds for the remainder of his life and undertook part-time consulting work on tropical land use.

== Early life ==
Richard Wildman Kettlewell was born on 12 February 1910 to George Wildman Kettlewell and Mildred Frances Kettlewell (born Atkinson); he had one brother, John Robert Wildman Kettlewell. Kettlewell was educated at Clifton College, Bristol and Reading University, where he read agriculture. After graduating, he joined the Colonial Agricultural Service and undertook postgraduate training in tropical agriculture at Cambridge University and the Imperial College of Tropical Agriculture in Trinidad, now part of the University of the West Indies. After successfully completing his training, Kettlewell was posted to Nyasaland in 1934, and served in different parts of the protectorate from 1934 to 1940.

In 1935, he married Margaret Palmer (died 1990), who he had met while studying in Reading, and they had two children, Michael George and Alison Victoria.

Kettlewell was a member of the King's African Rifles Reserve of Officers in Nyasaland, 1938-1939. During World War Two he served with the 1/2nd Battalion, King's African Rifles in British Somaliland, Ethiopia and Kenya against Italian forces until 1942. During 1942, his battalion was transferred to Ceylon with the 21st East Africa Brigade, part of the 1st (African) Division, and he served there in 1942 and 1943.

== Later career ==
After his war service, Kettlewell returned to the Nyasaland Agricultural Department, occupying several senior posts, from 1943 to 1950. At this point in his career, further promotion would normally have involved a move to another colony, to gain greater experience. He was offered a transfer to Uganda and a teaching post at the Imperial College of Tropical Agriculture in Trinidad. However, the Governor of Nyasaland, Sir Geoffrey Colby wished to retain his services and promoted him to be Deputy Director of Agriculture in 1950 so he could become Director of that department in 1951, and an ex officio member of the legislative council.

He was appointed as a Companion of the Order of St Michael and St George in 1955 in recognition of his services as Director of Agriculture for Nyasaland.

In addition to his membership of the legislative council, between 1957 and his retirement in 1962, Kettlewell served as a member of the Nyasaland Executive Council, which advised the governor. He was appointed Secretary, National Resources in 1960, and was described as "one of the most influential civil servants in the late colonial period" by the historian Kalinga.

In the 1961 elections in which the Malawi Congress Party gained a majority of seats in the legislative council, a new executive council was formed in the expectation of a transition to independence. As Hastings Banda, the Congress leader wished to assume the important National Resources portfolio, Kettlewell became Minister of Lands and Surveys from 1961 to 1962. He regarded independence with disfavour and retired in 1962 after the British Government had agreed that Nyasaland would become self-governing with Banda as its prime minister in 1963, and left the country.

On his return from Nyasaland, Kettlewell and his wife moved to the Cotswolds, where he lived for the remainder of his life. Between 1962 and 1980, Kettlewell undertook part-time consulting work for Hunting Technical Services, applying his expertise in tropical land use, mainly in South-East Asia, gradually easing into full retirement. During this period, he wrote 'Agricultural Change in Nyasaland: 1945-1960', which summarises his views on the problems facing colonial agriculture in that country and period.

Richard Wildman Kettlewell died on 17 November 1994.

== Agricultural policies ==
Kettlewell's own analysis of agricultural developments in Nyasaland from 1945 to 1960, covering most of the 18 years during which he held senior positions in departments responsible for agriculture, concentrated on cash crops, in particular those grown commercially by European farmers. His view of African subsistence farming was largely negative, concentrating on it supposedly causing soil erosion and destroying soil structure. He strongly disapproved of shifting cultivation and the consequent movement of villages and, where it existed, particularly in the north of the protectorate, the slash-and-burn cultivation of finger millet, commonly used to make traditional beer. Kettlewell, who was Director of Agriculture at the time, was also heavily involved in setting up the Agricultural Production and Marketing Board, which combined boards that had previously been separate, controlling maize, tobacco and cotton production and sale by smallholders.

In each case, Kettlewell sponsored several pieces of agricultural legislation that he considered necessary to meet his objectives. These provided for coercive measures, including fines or, in a limited number of cases, imprisonment for disregarding the regulations, and in some cases a requirement to undertake arduous and unpaid manual labour. The soil conservation and land use legislation which he believed would protect the environment involved government agricultural officers forcing many African subsistence farmers into compulsory labour on government-mandated conservation projects, which also took some of their cultivable land out of use. Kettlewell himself accepted that many Africans resented this enforcement action and acknowledged that it promoted nationalist sentiments, although he claimed that the initial resistance had soon subsided. However, the measures he supported were never effective in some parts of Nyasaland, particularly in the less-populated north of the protectorate, where there were too few agricultural officers to enforce compliance in the face of widespread resistance.

Kettlewell, as Director of Agriculture at the time, was heavily involved in setting up an Agricultural Production and Marketing Board, which combined boards that had previously been separate, controlling maize, tobacco and cotton production and sale by smallholders. He claimed that the new board's monopoly on the purchase of what the legislation termed 'African produce' would be justified by it paying fair prices to producers. However, the board's prices were biased against peasant producers, who also suffered a compulsory levy on their sales. This levy was supposed to meet the board's costs, but was pitched at a higher level than needed solely for this, and the excess was used to fund schemes that benefitted European commercial farmers rather that the Africans paying the levy. The board's initial operations were so unsatisfactory that the legislative council soon called for the revision of its pricing policy. The worst deficiencies of the scheme were not remedied until after Kettlewell's retirement in 1962, when a new Farmer's Marketing Board was created, although this, like its predecessor, operated a strict regime of heavy fines and possible imprisonment to enforce its rules.

The environmental catastrophe that Kettlewell predicted never took place, and in 1998, over 50 years after he first predicted it, most soils in Malawi were adequate for growing maize, as fertility had declined much less rapidly than he forecast. As early as the 1950s, a few tropical agriculturalists began to recognise shifting cultivation was sympathetic to the environment, and a much greater number of modern-day tropical agriculturalists consider this system may be more efficient than fixed cultivation in many tropical areas.

Between 1957 and 1959, there was significant discussion in Nyasaland and Northern Rhodesia on the proposal made by the federal government of the Federation of Rhodesia and Nyasaland to make non-African agriculture a federal responsibility, as it had already become in Southern Rhodesia, leaving the agriculture departments of in the two northern territories responsible only for African agriculture. This proposal had political implications, as it would allow the federal government to use its funds to promote European estate agriculture, leaving the funding of African agriculture to the limited resources of the two territorial administrations. This proposal was strongly supported by the leading settler politician, Michael Blackwood on political grounds and opposed by Nyasaland African Congress on the same basis. Kettlewell opposed the transfer of responsibility, firstly, on the technical grounds that it would be difficult to divide departmental responsibilities on the basis of land ownership and, secondly, because of the almost universal objection of Africans to it.

== Sources ==
- Colin Baker, (1998). ‘Retreat From Empire: Sir Robert Armitage in Africa and Cyprus’. London, IB Taurus. ISBN 978-1-86064-223-4.
- William Beinart, (1984). 'Soil Erosion, Conservationism and Ideas about Development: A Southern African Exploration, 1900-1960'. Journal of Southern African Studies, Vol. 11, No. 1.
- Richard Dawkins, (1994). 'Obituary of Richard Wildman Kettlewell, CMG, 1910–1994, read at his funeral at Chipping Norton'. https://www.richarddawkins.net/wp-content/uploads/.../AFW-web-appendix-3.pdf
- Owen Kalinga, (2012). 'Historical Dictionary of Malawi (fourth edition)'. Toronto, the Scarecrow Press. ISBN 978-0-81085-961-6
- Richard Kettlewell, (1965). 'Agricultural Change in Nyasaland: 1945-1960'. Stanford University Food Research Institute Studies in Tropical Development No.5.
- King's African Rifles, (1984). 'Papers of Major Richard Wildman Kettlewell', Bodleian Library, University of Oxford. https://archiveshub.jisc.ac.uk/search/archives/85f4212f-49ca-344a-a8c0-4a4c10c2e6fc?component=59f2058d-6aaf-3be5-a48b-d1fa4b03b773
- John McCracken, (2003). 'Conservation and Resistance in Colonial Malawi: the "Dead North" Revisited', in W Beinart and J McGregor (editors). Social History and African Environments, Oxford, James Currey. ISBN 0-85255-951-8.
- John McCracken, (2012). 'A History of Malawi, 1859–1966'. Woodbridge, James Currey. ISBN 978-1-84701-050-6.
- My Heritage, https://www.myheritage.com/names/richard_kettlewell
- Clement Ng'ong'ola, (1986). 'Malawi's Agricultural Economy and the Evolution of Legislation on the Production and Marketing of Peasant Economic Crops'. Journal of Southern African Studies, Vol. 12, No. 2.
- Sieglinde Snapp, (1998). 'Soil Nutrient Status of Smallholder Farms in Malawi'. Communications in Soil Science and Plant Analysis Vol. 29.
- T Jack Thompson (1995). 'Christianity in Northern Malawi: Donald Fraser's Missionary Methods and Ngoni Culture'. Leiden, Brill. ISBN 978-9-00410-208-8.
