= Apostlethrips =

Scientific classification
- Kingdom: Animalia
- Phylum: Arthropoda
- Class: Insecta
- Order: Thysanoptera
- Family: Phlaeothripidae
- Genus: Apostlethrips; Mound & Minaei, 2006

Type species
- Apostlethrips apostus Mound & Minaei, 2006

Genus of thrips

Apostlethrips is a genus of thrips in the family Phlaeothripidae, first described by Laurence Mound and Kamb Minaei in 2006. The type species is Apostlethrips apostus. The members of this genus are found only in Australia, in the Northern Territory and Western Australia, at the base of grass tussocks where they are believed to feed on fungal hyphae.

== Species ==
As listed by GBIF:

- Apostlethrips apostus Mound & Minaei, 2006
- Apostlethrips poaceaeus Wang, Mound & Tree, 2019
- Apostlethrips pygus Mound & Minaei, 2006
