= Nyasaland Association =

The Nyasaland Association was a political party in Nyasaland.

== History ==
The party was originally formed as an organisation with the aim of increasing the number of registered voters in the 1953 federal elections to the Assembly of the Federation of Rhodesia and Nyasaland; the franchise for the elections was restricted to people who were members of a "constituent association" recognised by the Governor-General. Over 400 people signed up and qualified to vote.

At the organisation's AGM in August 1955 a vote was held on becoming a political party, which was passed by 20 votes to 14. In the build-up to the 1956 general elections, it campaigned on a platform to "protect and foster the interests of Europeans in Nyasaland and to further the economic development of the territory". It also called for the constitution to remain unchanged for a year after the Federation of Rhodesia and Nyasaland was finalised, as well as seeking further land for European settlement. The party was widely regarded as a political vehicle for Michael Hill Blackwood.

On 13 January 1956 the party announced that it had agreed on six candidates for the six non-African seats up for election. However, two candidates (F G Collins and A C W Dixon) later withdrew their support of the Association's platform of protecting European interests. Eventually only three candidates ran as representatives of the party; M H Blackwood, L A Little and LF Hunt. Blackwood and Little were elected to the Legislative Council, but Hunt was defeated in North Nyasa.
