= Katothrips =

Scientific classification
- Kingdom: Animalia
- Phylum: Arthropoda
- Class: Insecta
- Order: Thysanoptera
- Family: Phlaeothripidae
- Genus: Katothrips; Mound, 1971

Type species
- Kladothrips tityrus Girault, 1928

Genus of thrips

Katothrips is a genus of thrips in the family Phlaeothripidae. It was first described by Laurence Alfred Mound in 1971. The type species is Kladothrips tityrus.

Species of this genus are found throughout all mainland states and territories of Australia, and they form galls on Acacias.

== Species ==
- Katothrips argenteus
- Katothrips biconus
- Katothrips brevitibia
- Katothrips brigalowi
- Katothrips brunneicorpus
- Katothrips capitatus
- Katothrips dampieri
- Katothrips diamantinus
- Katothrips echinatus
- Katothrips enochrus
- Katothrips flindersi
- Katothrips glandis
- Katothrips grasbyi
- Katothrips hamersleyi
- Katothrips hoarei
- Katothrips hyrum
- Katothrips mackeyanae
- Katothrips maslini
- Katothrips melasmus
- Katothrips mitchelli
- Katothrips neottus
- Katothrips nodus
- Katothrips orionis
- Katothrips papulus
- Katothrips pendulae
- Katothrips peratus
- Katothrips sifrus
- Katothrips spinosissimus
- Katothrips spinosus
- Katothrips stuarti
- Katothrips tagacis
- Katothrips tityrus
- Katothrips uniconus
- Katothrips unicus
- Katothrips yamma
