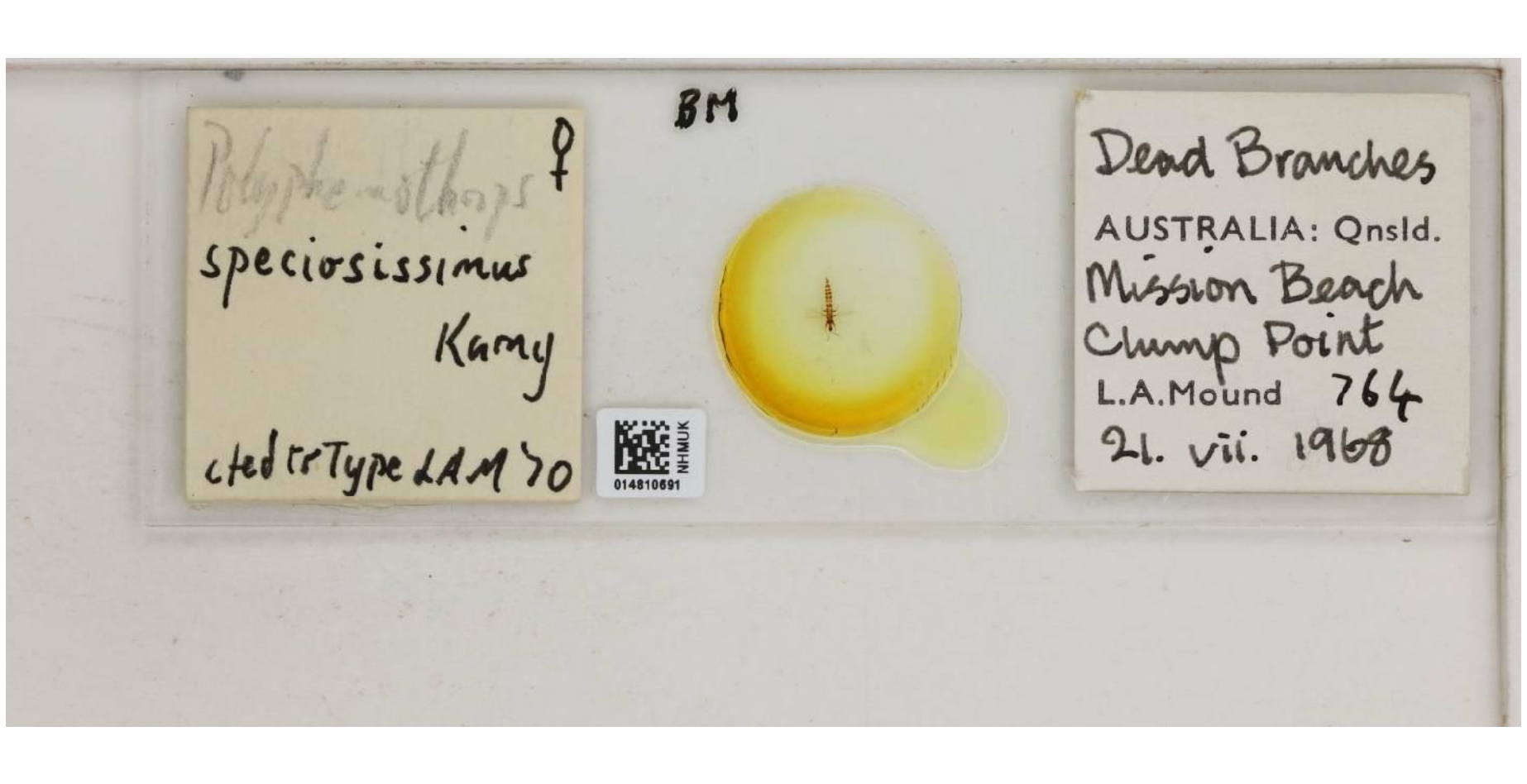
- Holothrips speciossissimus

Scientific classification
- Kingdom: Animalia
- Phylum: Arthropoda
- Clade: Pancrustacea
- Class: Insecta
- Order: Thysanoptera
- Family: Phlaeothripidae
- Subfamily: Phlaeothripinae
- Genus: Holothrips; Karny, 1911

Type species
- Holothrips ingens Karny, 1911

Synonyms
- Abiastothrips Priesner, 1925; Adelothrips Hood, 1938; Agnostothrips Moulton, 1947; Arthrips Soto-Rodríguez, Retana-Salazar & Rodríguez-Arrieta, 2013; Cordylothrips Hood, 1937; Cratothrips Priesner, 1927; Erythrinothrips Ananthakrishnan, 1956; Holmiella zur Strassen, 1972; Ischnothrips Moulton, 1944; Kolia Soto-Rodríguez, Retana-Salazar & Rodríguez-Arrieta, 2013; Lathrobiothrips Hood, 1934; Pseudosymphothrips Kurosawa, 1954; Stinothrips Ananthakrishnan, 1969

= Holothrips =

Genus of thrips

Holothrips is a genus of thrips in the family Phlaeothripidae, first described in 1911 by Heinrich Hugo Karny. The type species is Holothrips ingens.

Thrips from this genus feed on fungus.

== Species ==
- Holothrips aberrans
- Holothrips acutus
- Holothrips adelos
- Holothrips africanus
- Holothrips ambitus
- Holothrips amplus
- Holothrips anahuacensis
- Holothrips ananthakrishnani
- Holothrips andamanensis
- Holothrips andrei
- Holothrips angulatus
- Holothrips angulus
- Holothrips antennalis
- Holothrips apoensis
- Holothrips armatus
- Holothrips aspericaudus
- Holothrips attenuatus
- Holothrips australis
- Holothrips bellulus
- Holothrips bicolor
- Holothrips bipartitus
- Holothrips bratleyi
- Holothrips breedyi
- Holothrips breviceps
- Holothrips brevicollis
- Holothrips brevitubus
- Holothrips buccalis
- Holothrips bunyai
- Holothrips bursarius
- Holothrips caribbeicus
- Holothrips castanicolor
- Holothrips caudatus
- Holothrips celebensis
- Holothrips cephalicus
- Holothrips circulus
- Holothrips citricornis
- Holothrips conicurus
- Holothrips connaticornis
- Holothrips cornutus
- Holothrips coveri
- Holothrips cracens
- Holothrips cupreus
- Holothrips curvidens
- Holothrips durangoensis
- Holothrips eucharis
- Holothrips eurytis
- Holothrips falcatus
- Holothrips federicae
- Holothrips flavicornis
- Holothrips flavitubus
- Holothrips flavocastaneus
- Holothrips flavus
- Holothrips formosanus
- Holothrips formosus
- Holothrips frerei
- Holothrips fumidus
- Holothrips graminicolus
- Holothrips grandis
- Holothrips guanacastensis
- Holothrips hagai
- Holothrips hammockensis
- Holothrips hasegawai
- Holothrips hunanensis
- Holothrips indicus
- Holothrips ingens
- Holothrips insignis
- Holothrips japonicus
- Holothrips junctus
- Holothrips kuntiae
- Holothrips lafoae
- Holothrips lamingtoni
- Holothrips lanei
- Holothrips latidentis
- Holothrips lilianae
- Holothrips lucyae
- Holothrips luminosus
- Holothrips luteus
- Holothrips macrurus
- Holothrips madreselvensis
- Holothrips magnificus
- Holothrips maxillae
- Holothrips minor
- Holothrips mirandus
- Holothrips moundi
- Holothrips nepalensis
- Holothrips nigripes
- Holothrips nigritus
- Holothrips notialis
- Holothrips obscurifemorae
- Holothrips oceanicus
- Holothrips ogasawarensis
- Holothrips okinawanus
- Holothrips palmarum
- Holothrips palmerae
- Holothrips parallelus
- Holothrips peltatus
- Holothrips peninsulae
- Holothrips pericles
- Holothrips peruvianus
- Holothrips phaeura
- Holothrips pictus
- Holothrips porifer
- Holothrips potosiensis
- Holothrips procerus
- Holothrips pulchellus
- Holothrips quadratocapitis
- Holothrips quadrisetis
- Holothrips ramuli
- Holothrips robustus
- Holothrips ruidus
- Holothrips ryukyuensis
- Holothrips sakimurai
- Holothrips sawadai
- Holothrips schaubergeri
- Holothrips sculptilis
- Holothrips semiflavus
- Holothrips setosus
- Holothrips skwarrae
- Holothrips soror
- Holothrips speciossissimus
- Holothrips sporophagus
- Holothrips stannardi
- Holothrips storki
- Holothrips subtilis
- Holothrips tibialis
- Holothrips titschacki
- Holothrips torajanus
- Holothrips torosus
- Holothrips tubiculus
- Holothrips tumidus
- Holothrips typicus
- Holothrips umbricola
- Holothrips umbrosus
- Holothrips unicolor
- Holothrips woytkowski
- Holothrips xanthopus
- Holothrips yuasai
- Holothrips yurikoae
- Holothrips zaidae
- Holothrips zimmermanni
