= Geoffrey Herklots =

British botanist and ornithologist

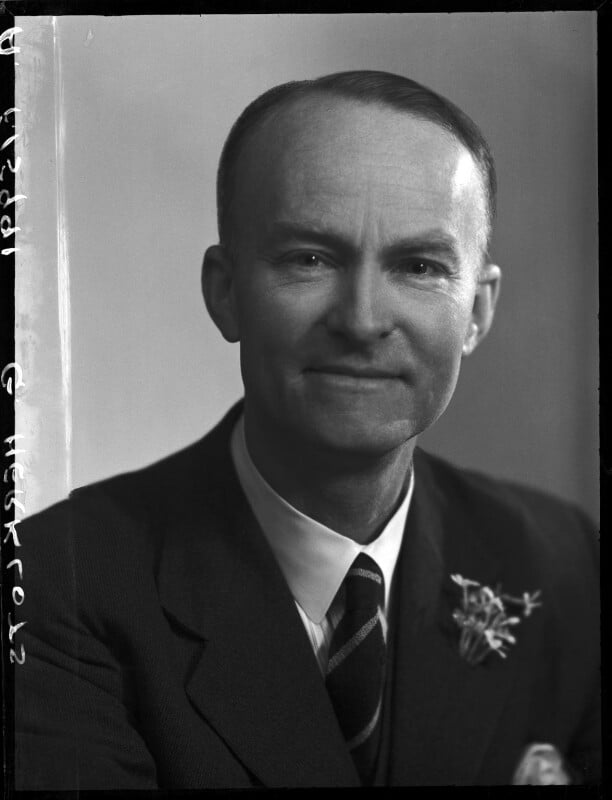
Herklots in 1953

Dr Geoffrey Alton Craig Herklots (1902 – 14 January 1986) was a British botanist and ornithologist. From 1928 he was a reader in biology at Hong Kong University until the Japanese occupation of Hong Kong in 1941, during which he was interned in Stanley, Hong Kong, until 1945. After the war was over he returned to London and joined the Colonial Service. From 1953 to 1960 he was Principal of the Imperial College of Tropical Agriculture in Trinidad.

Herklots is commemorated in the name of an orchid, Eria herklotsii Crib.

== Bibliography ==
- Crook, A.H.; & Herklots, G.A.C. (eds). (1930). The Hong Kong Naturalist. A quarterly illustrated journal principally for Hong Kong and South China. Vol 1. Newspaper Enterprise Limited: Hong Kong.
- Herklots, G.A.C. (1940). Common Marine-Food Fishes of Hong Kong. University of Hong Kong, Hong Kong. (2nd edition).
- Herklots, G.A.C. (1951). The Hong Kong Countryside. South China Morning Post, Hong Kong.
- Herklots, G.A.C. (1953). Hong Kong Birds. South China Morning Post, Hong Kong.
- Herklots, G.A.C. (1961). The Birds of Trinidad and Tobago. Collins, London.
- Herklots, G.A.C. (1967). Hong Kong Birds. South China Morning Post, Hong Kong. (2nd edition).
- Herklots, G.A.C. (1972). Vegetables in South-East Asia. George Allen and Unwin, London.
