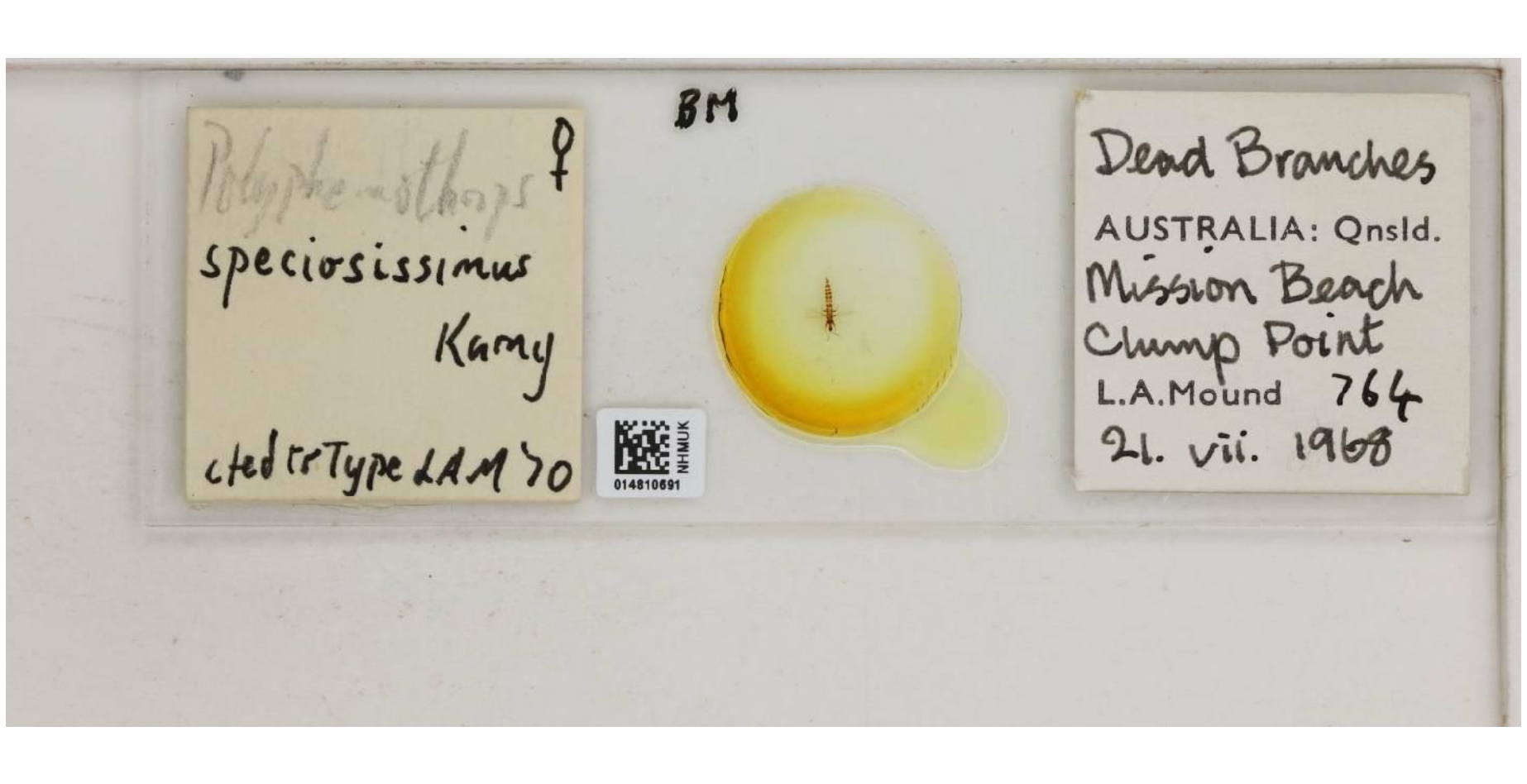
- (female) Mission Beach, Queensland

Scientific classification
- Kingdom: Animalia
- Phylum: Arthropoda
- Class: Insecta
- Order: Thysanoptera
- Family: Phlaeothripidae
- Genus: Holothrips
- Species: H. speciossissimus

Binomial name
- Holothrips speciossissimus (Karny, 1920)

Synonyms
- Adelothrips speciosissimus Nesothrips speciossissimus

= Holothrips speciossissimus =

Species of thrips

Holothrips speciossissimus is a species of thrips in the family Phlaeothripidae, first described in 1920 as Nesothrips speciossissimus by Heinrich Hugo Karny, from a specimen collected at Cedar Creek in Queensland.

It is found in the wet tropics of the Cape York peninsula.
