= Jeffrey Evans (disambiguation) =

Jeff or Jeffrey Evans may refer to:

- Jeffrey Evans, musician
- Jeffrey Evans, 4th Baron Mountevans (born 1948), current Lord Mayor of London
- Jeff Evans (umpire) (1954–2025), Welsh cricket umpire
- Jeff Evans, writer

== See also ==
- Geoff Evans (disambiguation)
