= Arthur Montagu Gwynn =

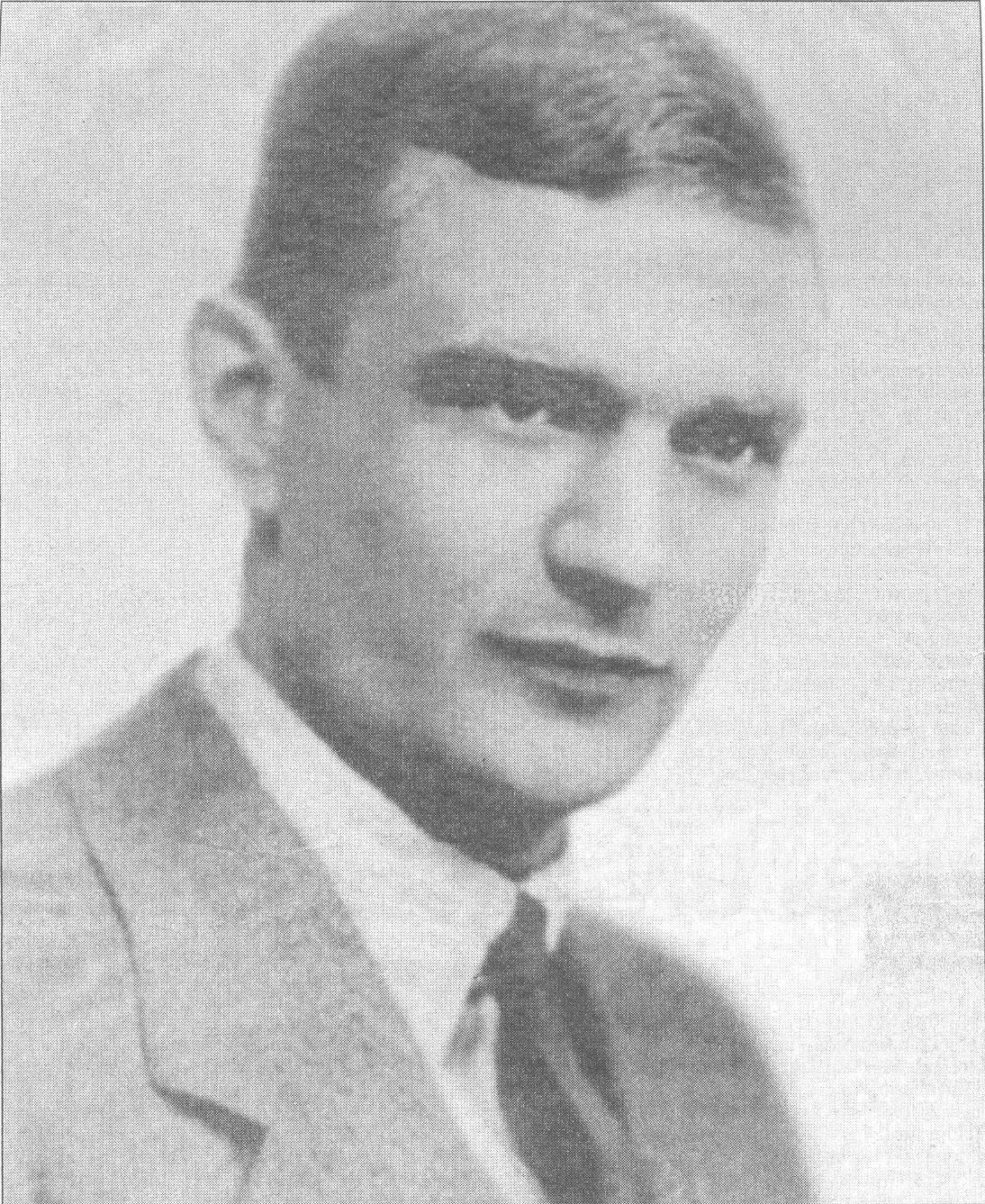
- Born: 5 August 1908; Dublin, Ireland
- Died: 31 January 2008 (aged 99); Sydney, N.S.W.

Arthur Montagu Gwynn (5 August 1908 – 31 January 2008) was an Irish scientist and doctor.

== Early life ==
Born in Dublin, his father was Edward John Gwynn, Irish scholar and sometime Provost of Trinity College Dublin. His mother was Olive Mary Gwynn née Ponsonby.

From an early age he took a keen interest in natural history and had a special fondness for birds.

After attending St Columba's College in Rathfarnham Arthur Gwynn studied at Trinity College Dublin, from which he graduated in 1930 with first class honours in zoology, botany and geology.

== Career ==
He then availed a scholarship offered by the UK Colonial Office to do postgraduate studies in Tropical Agriculture. After a year of laboratory research at Cambridge University he spent the second year at the Imperial College of Tropical Agriculture in Trinidad, studying a disease of the papaya tree. By the end of the year he had decided that agriculture was not his preferred field, and instead of taking his doctorate he donated his research papers to a fellow student and returned to England to seek employment using his knowledge of zoology.

From 1934 to 1938 he was engaged as a government entomologist doing field research on locusts, first in the remote Lake Chad area of west Africa, then at the Agriculture Research station at Serere, Uganda.

Shortly before the outbreak of World War II he returned to Britain to train as a medical doctor prior to enlisting in the army. He graduated MBBS from Aberdeen University in 1942, then signed up as a captain in the Rifle Brigade. He saw active service in Italy and won a Military Cross for bravery at the battle of Tossignano.

When the war ended Gwynn travelled to Australia and joined ANARE, the Australian National Antarctic Research Expedition, as a medical officer in a team being assembled by Dr Phillip Law to explore Macquarie Island. He took part in several Antarctic expeditions, acting variously as medical doctor, research scientist and officer in charge. In the course of this work he carried out original research and published several scientific papers on the Antarctic fauna.

During a break in the British Isles, 1950–1953, Gwynn worked as a research scientist at the Scott Polar Research Institute in Cambridge; as a radiologist at Bristol Royal Infirmary and as a general practitioner in the Shetland Isles.

Called back to Australia in 1953 to take part in a major expedition covering Heard Island and the Antarctic mainland, he was one of the team which established an Australian base there, Davis Station, the first permanent institution to be set up on the continent. An image of him standing by a cairn at the chosen site with colleagues Phillip Law and Peter Shaw featured on an Australian postage stamp issued in 1954. Gwynn Bay on the Antarctic mainland and Mount Gwynn on Macquarie Island were later named after him.

In 1956 Gwynn married a fellow scientist, Patricia Howard, who worked for the Antarctic Division of the Australian federal government. They spent two years doing research on Thursday Island before they settled in New South Wales. They had three children.

From 1958 to 1978 Gwynn was editor and sub-editor of the Medical Journal of Australia. After retiring from that post he worked for another seven years as a peripatetic doctor in the rural hinterland of New South Wales.

Throughout his years in Australia Gwynn maintained his keen interest in ornithology, catching and ringing many thousands of individual birds of various species and contributing notes on them to specialist journals.

Gwynn remained fit and active well into old age. He died in Sydney on 31 January 2008.

== Taxonomic eponyms ==
A species of African grasshopper was named after Arthur Gwynn following his work there in the 1930s: Amphiprosopia gwynni (Uvarov 1941) later renamed Jagoa gwynni (Uvarov 1941).

A species of lichen found in Antarctica was also named after him: Acarospora gwynnii (C W Dodge & E D Rudolph 1955).

== Works ==
- Notes on the fur seals at Macquarie Island and Heard Island, Antarctic Division, Department of External Affairs, 1953
- The status of the leopard seal at Heard Island and Macquarie Island, 1948-1950, Antarctic Division, Department of External Affairs, 1953
- Penguin Marking at Heard Island, 1951 and 1953, Australian National Antarctic Research Expeditions, Interim Reports No. 8 (with M.C. Downes)
