= Holothrips oceanicus =

Scientific classification
- Kingdom: Animalia
- Phylum: Arthropoda
- Class: Insecta
- Order: Thysanoptera
- Family: Phlaeothripidae
- Genus: Holothrips
- Species: H. oceanicus

Binomial name
- Holothrips oceanicus Okajima, 1987

Species of thrips

Holothrips oceanicus is a species of thrips in the Phlaeothripinae subfamily, first described in 1987 by Shûji Okajima. This thrips is found in the Australian Capital Territory, New South Wales, Queensland, and South Australia.

This thrips, like others of its genus, is fungus feeding and not usually found in large colonies.
