= John Spence (scientist) =

Vincentian-born Trinidadian politician, botanist and professor emeritus

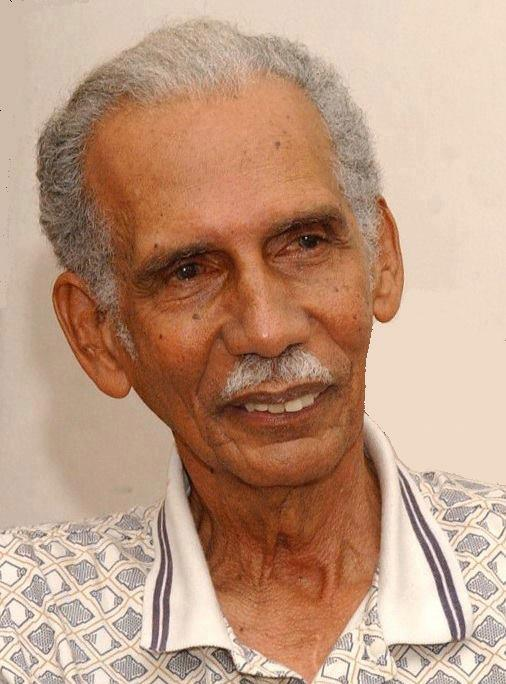
Image of Prof. John Spence

John Arnott Spence (15 July 1929 – 6 March 2013) was a Vincentian-born Trinidadian politician, botanist, and professor emeritus. Spence served as an independent Senator in the Senate of Trinidad and Tobago from 1987 to 2000.

Spence was born on 15 July 1929, on the island of Saint Vincent. He moved to Trinidad when he was 11 years old. He attended Queen's Royal College and the University of Bristol, where he obtained his Bachelor of Science in botany in 1951. Spence then completed a post-graduate diploma in Agricultural Science at the University of Cambridge in 1952 and a second diploma in Tropical Agriculture in 1953 from the Imperial College of Tropical Agriculture, Trinidad in 1953. He earned a doctorate in 1961 from the University of Bristol.

Spence served as the head of the Faculty of Agriculture at the University of the West Indies in Saint Augustine until his retirement in 1989. He then became the head of the Cocoa Research Unit (CRU), which he is credited with its expansion into an internationally recognized center.

Within the field of botany, Spence uncovered the importance of the polyphenol oxidase enzyme, which helps cocoa pods resist Phytophthora palmivora, which causes black pod disease. He also developed several varieties of dwarf pigeon peas which can be harvested by machine, instead of by hand.

Spence was the recipient of the gold Chaconia Medal in 1980 and the NIHERST Lifetime Achievement Award in 2000. He became a fellow of the Fellow of the Caribbean Academy of Science in 1990.

John Spence died of a heart attack on 6 March 2013, at the age of 83. He was survived by his wife, Yolande Spence, and their sons, John Malcolm Spence, Louis Spence and Richard Spence. His funeral was held at the University of the West Indies (UWI) Sports and Education Centre in St Augustine.
