= List of mayors of Blantyre =

This is a list of mayors of Blantyre, the second-biggest city in Malawi.

== Pre-independence mayors of Blantyre ==
In 1956 the councils of Blantyre and Limbe united under a single mayor. In 1961 the first non-European mayor was elected, the Asian lawyer Sattar Sacranie.

Election date	Mayor	Notes
	Williard Frank James	
	William Tait Bowie	
	Aubrey Victor Hall	Garage operator. Came to Nyasaland from the UK in 1923. Opened Hall's Garage in 1933. Halls Holdings Ltd later had branches across the country. Died 1955.
1951	Michael Hill Blackwood	
1960	Ian Guy Imray	Born Burton-on-Trent, 1918. Came to Nyasaland, 1951. MBE, 1964.
1961	Mr Chinsima	"In 1961 we had a mayor, Mr. Chinsima… Mr Chinsima put the staff on grades and improved salaries... He didn't stay long - only a few months - because he had become mayor without permission. Some said he was a friend of a minister and that is why he became mayor"
1963	Sattar Sacranie	

== Post-independence mayors of Blantyre ==
Mayors are elected by city councillors, who are in turn elected by city residents. Mayoral elections occur every two and a half years.

Election date	Mayor	Deputy Mayor
1963	Sattar Sacranie	
1967	John Kamwendo	
	James Duncan Phoya	
late 1970s	A. B. Mleme	
mid 1980s	M. A. Kumicongwe	
early 1990s	Luke Jumbe	
2001	John Chikakwiya	Anna Kachikho
July 2014	Noel Chalamanda	
January 2017	Wild Ndipo	
July 2019	Wild Ndipo	Joseph Makwinja
January 2022	Wild Ndipo	Funny Baraba Kanonjerera
July 2024	Joseph Makwinja	Isaac Jomo Osman
November 2025	Isaac Jomo Osman	Gerald Lipikwe
