= Freedom Hall (UWI) =

Freedom (Milner) Hall
- Co-Ed Residence Hall
- Location: St. Augustine, Trinidad and Tobago
- Nickname: Milnerites
- Motto: For on Freedom, Milnerites stand together as one.
- Established: 1927 (Imperial College of Tropical Agriculture)
- Colours: Maroon and White
- Residents: 333 students
- Mascot: The Lion
- Website: www.milnerite.net

Freedom Hall, formerly known as Milner Hall, is one of 5 halls of residence owned by the University of the West Indies (UWI) in St. Augustine, Trinidad and Tobago. In 2018, Milner Hall was renamed Freedom Hall by the administration of UWI after an extended period of consultation with students. Founded in 1927, Freedom Hall currently has housing for 333 students.

== History ==
Milner Hall was built in 1927 as one of five residence halls of the Imperial College of Tropical Agriculture (ICTA). It was named after the late Lord Viscount Milner who as Secretary of State for the colonies had commissioned the committee that proposed the college. When ICTA became UWI in 1963, Milner Hall continued to serve as a hall of accommodation for students.

During the period 1927 to present, Milner Hall moved from being one block of residency (West Block) and an additional dining facility to five blocks with an administrative building namely North Block, South Block, West Block, I Block, Post graduate Flats and the Cafe.

The name change from Milner to Freedom Hall occurred formally on Thursday 22 February 2018. The decision to change the name was attributed to reports of the association of Lord Alfred Milner, whom the Hall was named after, with crimes against humanity in Africa among other actions driven by his self-proclaimed 'British race supremacy' ideology.

== Layout ==
The hall consists of 5 blocks, located throughout the compound, namely:

West Block, Milner Hall.

- West Block - a Co-Ed block consisting of 32 single-occupancy rooms, 16 male on the lower floor and 16 female on the upper floor. West Block residents are members of the Hall committee and mainly students in their final year of undergraduate study who have lived in the hall for the entirety of their time at UWI.

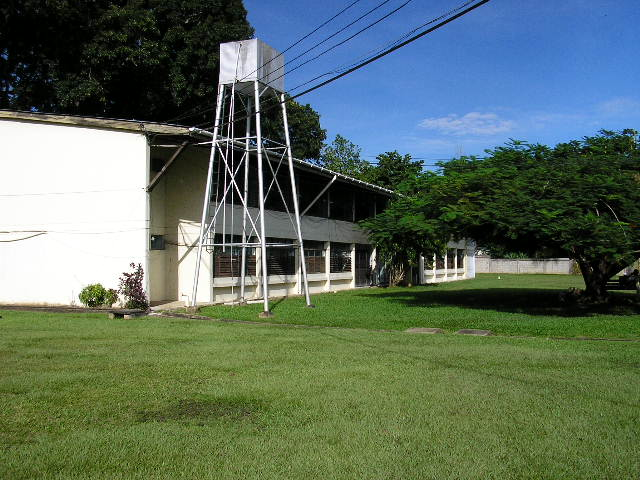
North Block, Milner Hall.

- North Block - an all-male block consisting of 32 double-occupancy rooms. Its occupants are mainly students in the university who are in their first or second year of undergraduate study. North Block is one of the more frequented blocks at Milner Hall, as it houses the hall's gym.

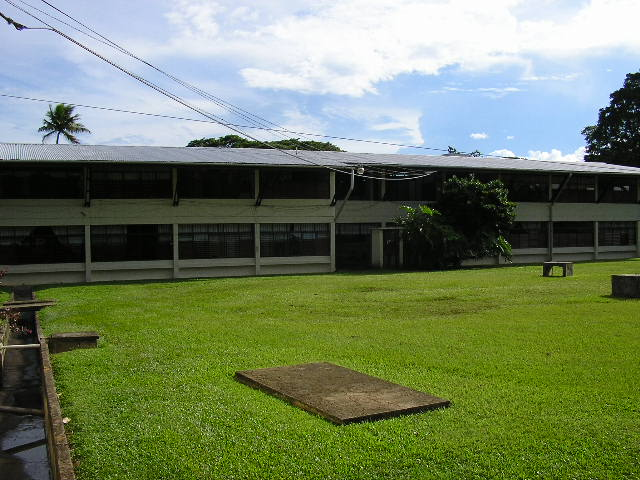
South Block, Milner Hall.

- South Block - an all-female block consisting of 32 double-occupancy rooms. Its occupants are mainly students in the university who are in their first or second year of undergraduate study. South Block is well known for its annual hosting of Milner Hall's International Food Day and South Block's Next Top Model.

(Note: West Block, North Block and South Block are all named for their locations relative to the administrative offices of the hall.)

Post Graduate Block, Milner Hall.

- Post Graduate Flats - This Block comprises five self containing Flats, each divided into four upper level bedrooms with the lower level used as a common living area. Each flat is either all male or all female. Its residents comprise single post graduate students.

=== I Block ===
The original I Block was demolished in 2005, since then it is now the newest addition to Milner Hall and is now the recently renovated and enlarged I Block. I Block is four stories tall, houses 153 students and encompasses much of the hall's Northwestern grounds. Each floor is co-ed and houses male students in the western flanks and female students in the east. The floor layout for I block is as follows:

- Ground Floor - This floor is for undergraduate students and comprises 22 double-occupancy rooms, 11 male and 11 female. The ground floor is also home to an air conditioned lounge room, known as The VIP.
- First Floor - This floor is for undergraduate students and comprises 23 double-occupancy rooms, 11 male and 12 female.
- Second Floor - The second floor of I block is also for undergraduate students and comprises 18 double-occupancy rooms, 6 male and 12 female. The second floor is also home to I Block's common room and lounge area.
- Third Floor - The third floor of I block is exclusively for post graduate students, and comprises 27 single-occupancy rooms, 13 male and 14 female. Each room contains its own bathroom facilities.

Other buildings on the hall include the porter's booth, the computer lab, and the administrative building, which is home to the supervisor's office and the multipurpose area.

== Sporting Facilities ==
The hall's property houses a basketball court, and many open areas, used for a variety of sporting activities. The cafe houses games equipment for pool and table tennis. Milner Hall is also in close proximity to the university's Sports and Physical Education Centre (SPEC).

== Hall Pledge ==
I pledge to uphold the principles and precepts of this Great Hall,

And to do all in my power,

Whenever and wherever possible,

To make this hall a beautiful place in which to live,

And a home away from home,

For on freedom,

Milnerites stand together as one. YAY!

== Past-Present Hall Chairpersons ==
- 2020 - (Pending)
- 2019 - Kenton "Heel Back" John; Trinidad & Tobago
- 2018 - Chantal "Tumblr" Callender; Trinidad & Tobago
- 2017 - Dayreon "Foetus" Mitchell; Trinidad & Tobago
- 2016 - Denesha "Victoria Not So Secret" Jennings; Trinidad & Tobago
- 2015 - Darren "Rapunzel" Archibald; Trinidad & Tobago
- 2014 - Vivian "GOTH" Mason; Antigua & Barbuda
- 2013 - Clarissa "Necessary Roughness" Violenus, St. Kitts and Nevis;
- 2012 - Ronald "Tonguetastic" Francis, St. Lucia;
- 2011 - Dwayne "Kotex" Murray, Trinidad and Tobago;
- 2010 - Yanik "Ital Byrd" Lubin, St. Lucia;
- 2009 - Alina "Inchez" Williams, Trinidad and Tobago;
- 2008 - Julien "Speaker" Skeete, Trinidad and Tobago;
- 2007 - Brian "Goady" Lashley, Barbados;
- 2006 - Christopher "Excess Baggage" Sampson, St Vincent;
- 2005 - Christopher "Excess Baggage" Sampson, St Vincent;
- 2004 - Ramon "Skettel" Walcott, Barbados;
- 2003 - Andrew "Balls Rash" Hunte, Trinidad and Tobago;
- 2002 - Ramon "Skettel" Walcott, Barbados;
- 2001 - Mobafa "Sludge" Baker, Country;
- 2000 - Roland "Krusty" Matthew, Country;
- 1999 - Chamberlin "Cacapoul" Emmanuel, Country;
- 1993 - George "Haggai" Alcee, St. Lucia;
- 1992 - Samuel "Deep" Johnson, Dominica;
- 1991 - Rohan "Shaka" Greenway, Montserrat;
- 1990 - Sean "Macho" Mathews, St. Lucia;
