= Cyril Webster =

British agriculturalist (1909–2007)

Cyril Charles Webster CMG
- Born: 28 December 1909
- Died: 8 August 2007 (aged 97)
- Education: Selwyn College, Cambridge
- Occupation: Agriculturalist
- Years active: 1933-1980
- Children: 1 son and 1 daughter

Cyril Charles Webster CMG (28 December 1909 – 8 August 2007) was a British agriculturalist who served in the Colonial Agricultural Service.

== Early life and education ==
Webster was born on 28 December 1909, the son of Ernest Webster. He was educated at Beckenham County School; the South East Agricultural College at Wye College, and Selwyn College, Cambridge. He then pursued further studies at Imperial College of Tropical Agriculture, Trinidad. Later, in 1949, he obtained a doctorate from London University.

== Career ==
Webster joined the Colonial Agricultural Service, and in 1933 went to central Burma where he worked with a company producing tung oil. An important ingredient in marine paints, he worked on improving methods to increase yields. In 1936, he went to Nigeria and worked on oil palm before moving to Nyasaland (now Malawi) in 1939 where he was involved again with tung oil production, then in great demand due to the outbreak of the Second World War. From 1950 to 1955, he served as Chief Research Officer in Kenya.

Webster went to Malaya in 1956, where he spent two years as Deputy Director of Agriculture. He then served as Professor of Agriculture and Deputy Principal at Imperial College of Tropical Agriculture (now part of the University of West Indies) from 1957 to 1960. Returning to Malaysia, he served as the last expatriate director of the Rubber Research Institute, Malaysia from 1961 to 1965. In 1961, he was involved in a dispute with the government over its acquisition of Rubber Research Institute land for the new Kuala Lumpur airport. In the same year, he organised the first rubber planters' conference in Malaya since 1938 attended by scientists and over 150 planters at which he delivered an address on the growing threat to the rubber industry of synthetic rubber. An important scientific research centre in the region employing over 1,000 people, in recognition of his services, he received the CMG and the Malaysian honour, Johan Mangku Negara.

After returning to the United Kingdom in 1965, he worked for ten years at the Agricultural Research Council (now the Biotechnology and Biological Sciences Research Council), rising from Scientific Adviser to the position of Chief Scientist, and second-in-command, in 1971. He returned to Malaysia in 1978, where he served as the first Director General of the Palm Oil Research Institute, remaining in the post until his retirement in 1980.

== Publications ==
- Agriculture in the Tropics, 1966, (with P. N. Wilson), 3rd edition 1998.
- Rubber (Tropical Agriculture), 1998 (with W. J. Baulkwill).
- Scientific papers in agricultural journals.

== Personal life and death ==
Webster married Mary Wimhurst in 1947, and they had a son and a daughter.

Webster died on 8 August 2007, aged 97.

== Honours ==
Webster received the Malaysian honour, Johan Mangku Negara (Hon.) (JMN) in 1966, and was appointed Companion of the Order of St Michael and St George (CMG) in the 1966 New Year Honours.
