= Jacob Ofori Torto =

Public servant

Minister for Food and Agriculture
- In office 1967–1968
- Appointed by: Joseph Arthur Ankrah
- Preceded by: F. A. Jantuah
- Succeeded by: Albert Adomakoh

Minister for Forestry
- In office 1968–1969
- Appointed by: Joseph Arthur Ankrah
- Preceded by: Ministry split
- Succeeded by: Ministry merged

Personal details
- Born: May 30, 1906 Accra, Gold Coast
- Education: King's College, Lagos
- Alma mater: University of California, Berkeley; Imperial College of Tropical Agriculture

Jacob Ofori Torto was a Ghanaian public servant. He served as Ghana's Commissioner (Minister) for Agriculture from 1967 to 1968, and Ghana's Commissioner (Minister) for Forestry from 1968 to 1969.

== Biography ==
Torto was born on 30 May 1906 in Accra. His formal education began at King's College, Lagos, Nigeria. He continued at the University of California, Berkeley where he obtained his bachelor's degree. He entered Imperial College of Tropical Agriculture, Trinidad in 1933, and qualified as an Associate of the Imperial College of Tropical Agriculture (A. I. C. T. A).

Torto begun as an Inspector of Produce in the Gold Coast in 1933. In 1938, he was appointed Agricultural Officer, and in 1949, he was promoted to Senior Agricultural Officer. He was elevated to the position of Food Production Commissioner in April 1952, and later appointed Chief Agricultural Officer of the Ministry of Food and Agriculture. From 1963 until his political appointment in 1967, he was a Field Project Expert for the United Nations. Torto served as Commissioner (Minister) for Agriculture and Forestry from 1967 until 1968 when the ministry was split into the Ministry of Agriculture and the Ministry of Forestry. He served as Commissioner (Minister) for Forestry from 1968 to 1969.

Torto's hobbies included lawn tennis. He once served as an Honorary Treasurer of the Ghana Lawn Tennis Association.

== See also ==
- National Liberation Council
- Minister for Food and Agriculture (Ghana)
