= Isaac Jomo Osman =

Malawian politician and Mayor of Blantyre City

Mayor of Blantyre City
- Incumbent
- Assumed office 14 November 2025
- Preceded by: Joseph Makwinja
- Constituency: Bangwe–Ntopwa Ward

Personal details
- Party: Democratic Progressive Party
- Occupation: Politician

Isaac Jomo Osman is a Malawian politician and local government leader currently serving as the Mayor of Blantyre in Malawi. He is a councillor representing Blantyre's Bangwe–Ntopwa Ward on the Democratic Progressive Party ticket. Osman rose through local politics to become deputy mayor before his election as mayor in 2025.

== Early life and background ==
Isaac Jomo Osman grew up in the Bangwe–Ntopwa area of Blantyre and rose from humble circumstances to enter local politics. Before entering civic leadership, he lived and worked in various informal sectors in Blantyre, experiences he has referenced in his public statements about urban social challenges.

Osman has also been involved in community activities, including supporting local sports teams such as women's football clubs.

== Political career ==
Osman was first elected as a councillor for the Bangwe–Ntopwa Ward on the ticket of the Democratic Progressive Party. His role as councillor has included engagement with residents on local issues and urban challenges facing Blantyre.

In July 2024, Osman was elected Deputy Mayor of Blantyre City Council, taking the position after fellow DPP councillor Joseph Makwinja was elected mayor. His tenure as deputy mayor involved advocating for addressing grassroots social concerns and improving city governance.

== Mayor of Blantyre city ==
In November 2025, Osman was elected Mayor of Blantyre City by the city council, succeeding previous city leadership. He secured the mayorship by winning 15 votes against other contenders in the council vote, including fellow DPP councillors.

Since assuming office, Osman has taken administrative steps to restore order and cleanliness in townships such as Limbe, including relocating Kabaza motorcycle taxi riders to designated spaces to reduce congestion and improve public safety.

He has also encouraged youth focus on technical skills and employment opportunities as part of development strategies for Blantyre and Malawi's broader workforce growth.

== Public image and poor behaviour ==
Osman's election as mayor generated both optimism and debate within Blantyre. Some property developers and local stakeholders have expressed confidence in his leadership potential and understanding of the city's dynamics, while public discussions have also emerged around qualifications and expectations for civic leadership. The Malawi Humans Rights Commission strongly condemned his actions in May 2026. He was videoed physically assaulting a woman who was accused of buying stolen goods. The Commission noted that not only is Osman not above the law but he is expected to set an example to others.
