= Gwynn Bay =

Bay in Antarctica

Gwynn Bay (67°5′S 57°57′E) is a bay close west of Hoseason Glacier along the coast of Enderby Land, Antarctica. It was mapped by Norwegian cartographers from air photos taken by the Lars Christensen Expedition, 1936–37, and named "Breidvika" (the broad bay). It was renamed by the Antarctic Names Committee of Australia for Dr. A.M. Gwynn, officer in charge at Macquarie Island Station in 1949.
