= The Commoners' New Forest =

Book by F. E. Kenchington

- Author: F. E. Kenchington
- Language: English
- Genre: Non-fiction
- Publisher: Hutchinson & Co. Ltd.
- Publication date: 1944
- Publication place: United Kingdom

The Commoners' New Forest is a book by F. E. Kenchington that became one of the core texts on the New Forest area of South and South West England. The book was completed in 1942, but it was not published until 1944 (with second and third editions appearing in 1945 and 1949, respectively) by Hutchinson & Co. Ltd. Its author was an agriculturist and author who served as an Associate of the Imperial College of Tropical Agriculture at Trinidad; his family were local to the district, and he moved there during World War II as part of the county war agricultural committee. He later moved to England where he worked as a lecturer at the Essex Institute of Agriculture (now Writtle University College).

The Commoners' New Forest describes the history of the region, placing a particular emphasis on its traditional laws and common rights. According to a reviewer in The Guardian, the book emphasises the past's "lessons for the future" and "offers a sincere and stimulating challenge not merely to [Kenchington's] fellow agriculturalists and to town and country planners but to all who have the true welfare of the people at heart".
