= Geoff Evans (cricketer) =

English cricketer (1939–2016)

Geoffrey Rossall Evans (28 April 1939 – 13 September 2016) was an English cricketer. He was a right-handed batsman and wicket-keeper who played for Devon. He was born in Exeter.

Evans, who represented the side in the Minor Counties Championship between 1972 and 1980, made a single List A appearance for the side, during the 1978 Gillette Cup, against Staffordshire. From the tailend, he scored 2 not out.

After his playing career, Evans served Devon CCC as secretary from 1986 until 2009 and then as chairman up until his death.
