= Imperial College of Tropical Agriculture =

Post-graduate training institution in Trinidad

The Imperial College of Tropical Agriculture was a post-graduate training institution for the British empire located in St Augustine, Trinidad for the study of tropical agriculture and the cultivation of tropical produce. It was established in 1921 and received a Royal Charter in 1926. In 1960, it became the Faculty of Agriculture of the University College of the West Indies, an external college of the University of London. In 1962, University College became the independent University of the West Indies (UWI) and the college became its Faculty of Agriculture.

== History ==
It is believed that the college was the brainchild of Sir Norman Lamont who suggested an institution of its kind be established as early as 1902. Lamont would serve as a governor of the college from 1921–1945.

The college was formally proposed in 1919 by a committee appointed by Viscount Milner, the Secretary of State for the Colonies. The committee proposed the establishment of an agricultural training institution for the British colonies "to provide instruction in tropical agriculture and in the cultivation and preparation for market of tropical produce of every kind."

The college was established in St. Augustine, Trinidad on 30 August 1921 and called the West Indian Agricultural College. It officially opened in October 1922. It provided instruction in tropical agriculture, and also assumed the duties of the Imperial Department of Agriculture for the West Indies.

In 1924, the college's name was changed to the Imperial College of Tropical Agriculture. A petition for the grant of a charter was presented to the Queen on or before 1 June 1926 and the school was incorporated by Royal Charter the same year.

In 1927, the Committee on Agricultural Research in the Non-Self-Governing Dependencies recommend that the college become a centre for training agricultural cadets for colonial service. The Committee had been chaired by Viscount Milner before his death in 1925.

In 1929, Frank Leonard Engledow carried out the first of his two trips to the college, a 9 week trip on behalf of the Empire Marketing Board to inspect the Cotton Research Institute and to report on the teaching and research of the college resulting in a confidential report. Engledow would later serve as a member of the Board of the college for several years and even its chair. In 1931, the Empire Marketing Board approved grants of £189,000 for training at Cambridge University and the Imperial College of Tropical Agriculture. The same year, the Sunday Times noted that, while the college was well subscribed by students from the British Isles, Africa, India, Malaya, and the West Indies, it didn't appear to have any students from Australia or New Guinea.

In 1955, a Regional Research Centre (RRC) was established as part of College. In 1960, the college became the Faculty of Agriculture of the University College of the West Indies, a college of the University of London. In 1962, when University College became the independent University of the West Indies (UWI), the college became UWI's Faculty of Agriculture. In the late 1960s, RRC staff were also transferred to UWI's Faculty of Agriculture.

== Academics ==
The college was the only recognised postgraduate training centre for tropical agriculture and related disciplines across the British Empire. Many of its students were appointed to the Colonial Agricultural Service, holding posts across the world. For many agricultural officers employed in departments across the Empire, it was a requirement to spend a year or more at the college before assuming their duties.

In 1931, the school taught subjects such as "tropical agriculture, sugar, banana and cotton growing,... veterinary science, botany, zoology, entomology, mycology, bacteriology, and economics, sanitation, hygiene".

In 1932, the school offered:

- a three year course in tropical agriculture open to any student with a recognised degree or diploma
- a three year course in West Indian agriculture leading to a diploma, which was reserved in the first instance for students from the West Indies; and
- refresher courses for agricultural officers from government departments.

The college was an Associate Member of the Association of Universities of the British Commonwealth.

== Admission ==
The college was open to any person holding a degree or diploma from a British university or any approved institutions outside the UK or any person holding qualifications considered equivalent to matriculation at a university in the British Empire.

== Funding ==
The college was funded by the British Government and colonial governments. The British Treasury matched the contributions of colonial governments pound for pound and an additional contribution was made by the Treasury from the Colonial Development and Welfare Fund.

== Location ==
The college and its buildings were located at St. Augustine, seven miles east of Port of Spain, Trinidad. In 1932, the college had laboratories and approximate 100 acres of cultivable land for field experiments in agriculture, as well as a sugar factory and a low temperature station.

Milner Hall, one of five halls of residence, was built in 1927 and named for Viscount Milner. Its name was changed to Freedom Hall in 2018.

== Journal ==
In 1924, the college began publishing the journal,Tropical Agriculture, with a focus on tropical agricultural research.

The journal continues to be published today by the University of the West Indies.

== Governors ==
- Sir Edward Rae Davson
- Sir Eliot de Pass
- Sir James Currie, KBE, CMG, Chairman of the Governing Body
- Professor John Bretland Farmer
- Sir Harold Tempany
- Sir Norman Lamont, from 1921–1945

== Principals ==
- Sir Geoffrey Evans, from 1926 to 1938
- Geoffrey Herklots
- Hugh Martin-Leake
- Harold James Page

== Notable faculty ==
- Claude Wilson Wardlaw was appointed Plant Pathologist for Banana Research in 1928, with focus on researching the Panama Disease
- Cyril Charles Webster, Professor of Agriculture and Deputy Principal from 1957 to 1960
- E. E. Cheesman, Demonstrator in Botany, took up appointment on 29 Sept 1923
- F. E. Kenchington, author of The Commoners' New Forest
- Frederick William Urich, Assistant Professor of Zoology 1926 to 1935.
- John Golding Myers
- Norman Willison Simmonds
- Ronald Gordon Fennah
- Sydney Ashby

== Notable alumni ==
- Arthur Montagu Gwynn
- Cyril Charles Webster
- Desmond Vesey-Fitzgerald, Associate
- Edward Oliver LeBlanc, Chief Minister of Dominica
- Eugene Bortei-Doku, Ghana's Secretary for Agriculture
- Jacob Ofori Torto, Associate
- James Fitz-Allen Mitchell, Prime Minister of Saint Vincent and the Grenadines
- James Morris Blaut, American professor of anthropology and geography
- John Arnott Spence
- Leslie Edward Wostall Codd, South African plant taxonomist.
- Norman Willison Simmonds
- Peter Posnette
- Richard Wildman Kettlewell
- Walter Findlay
