= Michael Hill Blackwood =

English politician (1917–2005)

Michael Hill Blackwood CBE (13 May 1917 – 1 February 2005) was a lawyer and politician who spent most of his working life in colonial Nyasaland and in Malawi in the early years of its independence. Although he represented the interests of European settlers before independence and opposed both the transfer of power to the African majority and the break-up of the Federation of Rhodesia and Nyasaland, he remained in the country as a member of its legislature after Malawi’s independence and until his retirement on 1983.

== Early life and military service ==
Michael Hill Blackwood was born in Ormskirk, Lancashire, England on 13 May 1917, the son of John Anthony Blackwood (died 1974), a solicitor. He was educated at Ormskirk Grammar School and later read law at Liverpool University. He became an articled clerk in his father’s legal practice in Liverpool, and qualified as a solicitor in 1939. In 1940, Blackwood joined the Royal Artillery and saw service, first in Madagascar, and from 1944 to 1946 in India and Burma, with the 11th (East Africa) Division, composed of troops from Kenya, Uganda, Nyasaland, Tanganyika and Northern Rhodesia. This division was part of the Fourteenth Army in the Burma Campaign: he rose to the rank of major. Blackwood retained an interest in military personnel matters as Chairman of the Commonwealth Ex-Services League of Malawi and Chairman of the Ex-Servicemen's Memorial Homes Trust from 1965 until 1973.

== Legal career ==
When demobilised in 1946, Blackwood moved to Blantyre, Nyasaland, joining the law firm of Wilson and Morgan there as an assistant solicitor, later becoming a partner. He spent the remainder of his professional career as a lawyer. Blackwood was appointed as a Member of the Judicial Assistance Commission of the International Bar Council in 1951, in 1966 he became Chairman of the Malawi Law Society and in 1970 he was appointed as Legal Adviser to the British High Commissioner in Malawi. In 1979 the President of the Republic of Malawi appointed him Senior State Counsel, a largely honorary position.

== Political career ==
From shortly after his arrival in Nyasaland, Blackwood became active in local politics, representing the interests of European settlers. He was Mayor of Blantyre from 1951 to 1952, and he was nominated as a member of the Nyasaland Legislative Council in 1953. Also in 1953, he was one of the founders of the Nyasaland Association, which was organised to increase the number of registered European voters able to vote in the 1953 federal elections to the Assembly of the Federation of Rhodesia and Nyasaland. Blackwood was strongly in favour of the Federation and, after the 1953 election, became deputy leader of the United Federal Party in Nyasaland. In 1960, Blackwood led the opposition within Nyasaland to the transfer of power to the African majority, and in April 1963, with the impending dissolution of the Federation, he became chairman of the Nyasaland Constitutional Party. This was, in effect a continuation of the Nyasaland branch of the United Federal Party. However, once Nyasaland had achieved majority rule under a Malawi Congress Party administration, he dropped his opposition to independence and cooperated with the new order.

== Career as legislator ==
When direct elections to the Legislative Council were introduced in 1956, Blackwood was one of six members directly elected by voters on the non-African voter roll. He was appointed a member of Executive Council in 1956, serving from then until internal self-government under a Malawi Congress Party majority was achieved in 1961. He remained as an elected member of the Legislative Council until it was replaced in 1964 by a Legislative Assembly, retaining a seat in the latter in the 1964 Nyasaland general election, the last election in which a separate electoral roll for non-African voters was retained. In 1966, when Malawi became a one-party state, the separate electoral roll was abolished and the Nyasaland Constitutional Party was dissolved. Blackwood was one of the first nominated members of the National Assembly of Malawi, and sat with elected members from then until 1973, when he retired from active politics. During the period 1966 to 1973, he was Chairman of the Public Accounts Committee in the National Assembly.

== Later life and honours ==
In 1963, Blackwood was appointed as Commander of the Order of the British Empire. He held many other public offices, including as Registrar and Chancellor of the Anglican diocese of Malawi, Chairman of the Malawi Hotels and Tourist Board, President of the Nyasaland Society for the Blind and a member of the University of Malawi University Council. At the time of his retirement on 30 June 1983, he was a director of 85 companies in Malawi and elsewhere.

Michael Hill Blackwood died in Durban, South Africa on 1 February 2005.

== Sources ==
- Colin Baker, (2005). ‘Michael Hill Blackwood - Obituary’. The Society of Malawi Journal, Vol. 58, No. 2 (2005), p. 42
- Owen J. M. Kalinga, (2012). ‘Historical Dictionary of Malawi (fourth edition)’. Toronto, the Scarecrow Press. ISBN 978-0-81085-961-6
- Colin Leys, (1957). ‘An election in Nyasaland’. Political Studies, Vol V, No 3, pp. 258–280
- John McCracken, (2012). A History of Malawi, 1859–1966, Woodbridge, James Currey. ISBN 978-1-84701-050-6
- J. Richard Wood, (2012). ‘So Far and No Further! Rhodesia's Bid for Independence During the Retreat from Empire 1959-1965’. Victoria, Trafford Publishing. ISBN 978-1-46693-408-5
