= Henry Kettlewell =

English cricketer

Personal information
- Full name: Henry Wildman Kettlewell
- Born: 20 July 1876; Harptree Court, East Harptree, Bath, Somerset, England
- Died: 28 April 1963 (aged 86); Harptree Court, East Harptree, Bath, Somerset, England
- Batting: Right-handed
- Bowling: Right-arm fast

Domestic team information
- Years: Team
- 1899: Somerset

Career statistics
Competition	FC
Matches	1
Runs scored	7
Batting average	7.00
100s/50s	0/0
Top score	6*
Balls bowled	40
Wickets	0
Bowling average	–
5 wickets in innings	–
10 wickets in match	–
Best bowling	0/30
Catches/stumpings	0/–
- Source: CricketArchive (subscription required), 22 December 2015

Henry Wildman Kettlewell (20 July 1876 – 28 April 1963) was a British Army officer and an English cricketer. He was a right-handed batsman and right-arm fast bowler who played for Somerset. He was born and died in East Harptree.

== Life ==
Having played for Eton College between 1893 and 1895, Kettlewell made a single first-class appearance for the team during the 1899 season, against Hampshire. Kettlewell scored a single run in the first innings in which he batted, and 6 not out in the second. Kettlewell took figures of 0-30 in the eight overs in which he bowled.

Kettlewell received his commission as a second lieutenant in the King's Shropshire Light Infantry on 28 May 1898. He served in the Second Boer War in South Africa, and was promoted to lieutenant on 3 April 1900. After the end of this war, he went with the 2nd battalion of his regiment to British India, leaving from Point Natal to Bombay on the SS Syria in January 1903, and was posted to Ranikhet in Bengal.
