= Geoff Evans (political scientist) =

British political scientist and academic

Geoffrey Evans, FBA is a British political scientist and academic. He is Professor of the Sociology of Politics at the University of Oxford and an Official Fellow in Politics at Nuffield College, Oxford. He is a political scientist who has also held posts in psychology and sociology. An expert in elections, he is long-standing editor of the journal Electoral Studies. In 2013 he was appointed co-director of the British Election Study, the Scottish Referendum Study and the Northern Ireland Election Study. In 2016 he also became director of the EU Referendum Study.

Evans was born in Stoke-on-Trent where he lived until his mid-twenties, having spent periods working on the factory floor in the potteries, before studying for his A levels as a mature student and leaving to take up a place at university. He regularly returns to North Staffordshire, where he maintains close ties with friends and family and is a season ticket holder at Stoke City F.C.

Among his research interests is a long-term concern with social inequality and the political representation of the working class, stemming to a large degree from his own background and early working years in Stoke. His other research examines political divisions between classes, religions and ethnic groups in a range of other societies including Northern Ireland and post-communist Eastern Europe. As a psychologist by training he examines the factors that shape how people understand and relate to politics and their place in society.

In July 2019, he was elected Fellow of the British Academy (FBA), the United Kingdom's national academy for the humanities and social sciences.

== Selected publications ==
- Evans G. The End of Class Politics? Class Voting in Comparative Context, Oxford University Press, 1999.
- Evans G. & De Graaf, N.D. Political Choice Matters: Explaining the strength of class and religious cleavages in cross-national perspective, Oxford University Press, 2013.
- Evans G. & Tilley J. The New Politics of Class: The Political Exclusion of the British Working Class, Oxford University Press, 2017.
- Evans G & Menon, A. Brexit and British Politics, Polity Press, 2017.
