= Roger Kettlewell =

Football Player

No. 14, 70, 33
- Position: Defensive back

Personal information
- Born: 1945 (age 80–81)
- Listed height: 6 ft 2 in (1.88 m)
- Listed weight: 205 lb (93 kg)

Career information
- Junior: Vancouver Blue Bombers
- University: Simon Fraser

Career history
- 1966–1968: BC Lions
- 1969: Edmonton Eskimos

Roger Kettlewell (born 1945) is a Canadian former professional football defensive back who played four seasons in the Canadian Football League (CFL) with the BC Lions and Edmonton Eskimos. He played CIS football at Simon Fraser University.

== Early life ==
Roger Kettlewell was born in 1945. He played CIS football for the Simon Fraser Clan of Simon Fraser University, with his final year being in 1965. He also played junior football for the Vancouver Blue Bombers.

== Professional career ==
Kettlewell played in six games for the BC Lions of the Canadian Football League (CFL) in 1966 and wore jersey number 14. He played in all 16 games during the 1967 season, recording two interceptions for 27 yards and one kickoff return for ten yards. He played in five games the next year in 1968. Kettlewell wore number 70 for the Lions from 1967 to 1968.

Kettlewell played in all 16 games for the Edmonton Eskimos of the CFL in 1969, totaling two interceptions, three rouges, and 121 punts for 4,627 yards. He wore number 33 with the Eskimos.
