= Geoffrey Evans (botanist) =

British botanist (1883–1963)

Sir Geoffrey Evans CIE (1883–1963) was a botanist who was Economic Botanist and acting Director at the Royal Botanic Gardens, Kew.

== Early life ==
Evans was born in Walmersley, near Bury, Lancashire, England, on 26 June 1883. He was educated in Bury, and at Downing College, Cambridge, where he received a Diploma in Agriculture in 1905.

== Career ==
After working at the Agricultural Department of the University of Cambridge, he was in the Indian Agricultural Service from 1906 to 1923. From 1927 to 1938 he was Principal of the Imperial College of Tropical Agriculture in Trinidad, and worked from there in Australia, Fiji and New Guinea.

Evans was a Member of the British Guiana Refugee Commission, a Member of the Commission on Higher Education in West Africa from 1942 to 1943 and Chairman of the Commission for Settlement in British Guiana and British Honduras.

In 1938 Evans joined the staff of the Royal Botanic Gardens, Kew, where he was Economic Botanist (1938–1954) and, from 1941 to 1943, acting Director. He can be seen in the short colour film World Garden by cinematographer Geoffrey Unsworth in 1942.

== Death and legacy ==
He died at Mayfield, Sussex, on 16 August 1963. His papers, covering the period 1906 to 1955, are held at the Bodleian Library in Oxford. A portrait of Evans by Walter Stoneman, made in 1948, is held at the National Portrait Gallery, London.
