= Legislative Council (Nyasaland) =

Legislature of Nyasaland

The Legislative Council was the legislature of Nyasaland.

== History ==
The Legislative Council was established in 1907 by the Nyasaland Order in Council. It initially consisted of the Governor, several ex-officio members, including the attorney general, the chief secretary and the financial secretary, official members (Europeans employed by the British authorities), unofficial members (Europeans not employed by the authorities) and extraordinary members who were appointed by the governor when special advice was required. The new Council met for the first time on 7 May 1908. In the first Council the unofficial members had a five-year term, reduced to three thereafter.

By 1932 the Chamber of Agriculture and Commerce was responsible for nominating two candidates for vacancies of the unofficial (from which the governor would choose), whilst one member was usually appointed from the Missionary Societies. In 1932 the number of official and unofficial members was increased to four of each.

In 1939 the Council was reformed, becoming a 13-member body consisting of the governor, six official members and six unofficial members. Of the six unofficial members, four were chosen from a list of nominees produced by the Nyasaland Convention of Associations, one from a list provided by the Northern Provinces Association and one from Missionary Societies. A further six members were added in 1949, of which three were officials, two were Africans recommended by the African Protectorate Council and appointed by the governor and one was from a list submitted by the Indian Chamber of Commerce. Another official and an African unofficial member were added in 1953, bringing total membership to 21, of which three were Africans.

Changes to the constitution in 1955 introduced direct elections to the Council, which was reformed to consist of the governor, four ex officio members (the attorney general, the chief secretary, the financial secretary and the Secretary for African Affairs), seven officials and eleven elected members. Six of the elected members were non-Africans elected directly by a non-African voter roll, with the other five indirectly elected by the African Provincial Councils. The first elections were held on 15 March 1956.

In 1957 the 23-member Council moved into a new building in Zomba, as the original building completed in 1908 had been designed for only seven members. In February 1958 Henry Wilcox Wilson was appointed as the Council's first Speaker, replacing the governor. The following year the Council was expanded again, with another seven officials and two African members added. Elections due to be held that year were cancelled due to a state of emergency, and the additional two African members were nominated to fill the vacancies instead.

A new constitution in 1960 increased membership of the Council to 28, of which 20 were elected by voters on the "lower roll" and eight by voters on the "higher roll". Those on the lower roll had to be at least 21, have paid tax for at least 10 years, be literate in English and have an income of MK240 per year, ownership of at least MK500 worth of property or literacy in any other language. The upper roll was limited to university graduates, people with a secondary education and income of at least MK600 a year or property worth MK100, people with a primary education and an income of at least MK960 a year or property worth MK200, or people with no education and an income of at least MK1,400 a year or owning MK3,000 of property. A total of 106,095 qualified for the lower roll and 4,337 for the higher roll. Elections were held in 1961 and won by the Malawi Congress Party, which took 22 of the 29 seats.

Following more amendments to the constitution after talks in 1963, the Legislative Council was to be replaced by the Legislative Assembly. The first elections to the new Assembly were held on 28 April the following year.
