= Laurence Alfred Mound =

British-born entomologist

Laurence Mound AO
- Born: 22 April 1934 (age 91); Willesden, London, England
- Education: University of London; Imperial College of London; I.T.C.A. Trinidad
- Occupation: Entomologist
- Known for: Studying Thysanoptera biology and systematics

Laurence Alfred Mound (born 1934 in Willesden, London) is an entomologist, who works mostly on the biology and systematics of Thysanoptera (thrips), an area in which he is considered a world authority.

His zoological author abbreviation is Mound.

== Career ==
He gained a BSc in zoology at the University of London in 1957, a diploma in economic entomology in 1958 from Imperial College, London, a diploma of tropical agriculture from I.C.T.A. Trinidad in 1959, and in 1975 was awarded a D.Sc from the University of London.

From 1959 to 1961 he served in Ibadan as entomologist to the Nigerian Department of Agricultural Research, working on whitefly vectors of crop virus diseases. In Sudan (1961-1964), he continued this work on whiteflies as entomologist to the Empire Cotton Growing Corporation. In 1964 he was appointed to the British Museum of Natural History, where he was responsible for the collections of whitefly and thrips and their research. He became head of the hemiptera section of BMNH in 1969, and deputy keeper of the entomology department in 1975, and head keeper in 1981. In 1994 he moved to Australia where he continues to work on Thysanoptera.

Mound was appointed Officer of the Order of Australia in the 2025 Australia Day Honours.

== Taxa authored ==
He has described over 640 thrips species and some 90 thrips genera.

== Selected publications ==
- Mound LA; Tree DJ (2022), Tubulifera Australiensis - Thysanoptera-Phlaeothripidae Genera in Australia, Wikidata Q111633067
- Mound LA; Collins DW; Hastings A (2018), Thysanoptera Britannica et Hibernica. Thrips of the British Isles, Wikidata Q111653850

== See also ==
Category:Taxa named by Laurence Alfred Mound
