= Udyan Pandit Award =

Award is given for excellence in fruit cultivation in India

The Udyan Pandit Award is given for excellence in fruit cultivation in India. An award is given in each of the categories of apple, banana, grapes, guava, mandarin, mango, pineapple, and sweet orange. It is sponsored by the National Horticultural Board and awarded at both state. and national levels.

== See also ==
- List of agriculture awards
