= Agricultural Hall of Fame of Quebec =

Coordinates: 45.6348369°N 72.9577886°W

- Temple de la renommée de l'agriculture du Québec
- Formation: 1991
- Type: not-for-profit
- Purpose: Hall of Fame
- Location: Saint-Hyacinthe, Quebec, Canada
- Official language: French
- Website: http://www.templeagriculture.org/

The Agricultural Hall of Fame of Quebec (French: Temple de la renommée de l'agriculture du Québec) honours and celebrates those who have made a lasting contribution to the advancement in the field of agriculture in the province of Quebec, Canada.

A non-profit association founded in 1991 and located in Saint-Hyacinthe, Quebec, the Agricultural Hall of Fame of Quebec is currently administered by a board of 9 individuals elected during a general assembly that is held on a yearly basis.

== Gallery ==
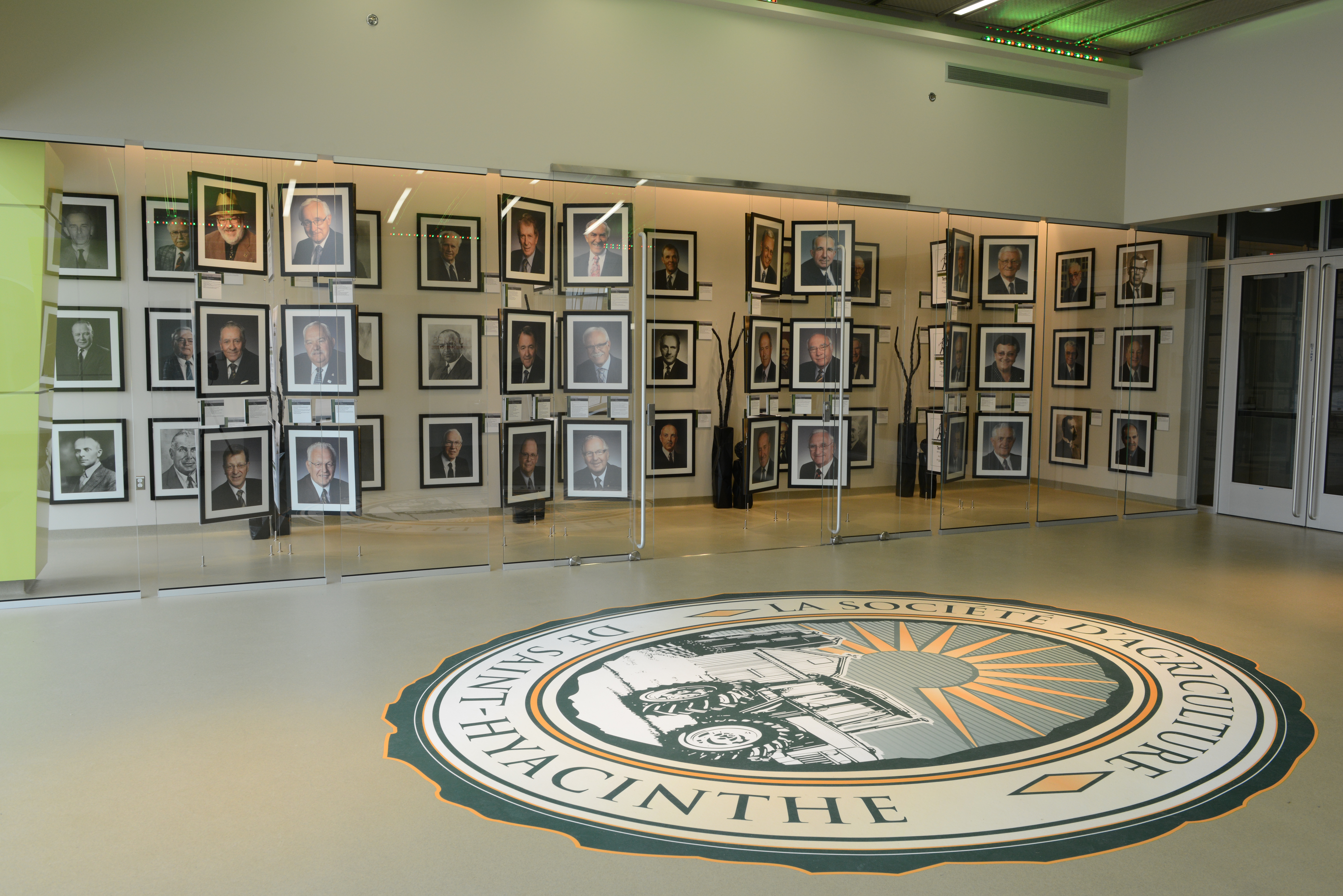
The hall of fame seen from the outside

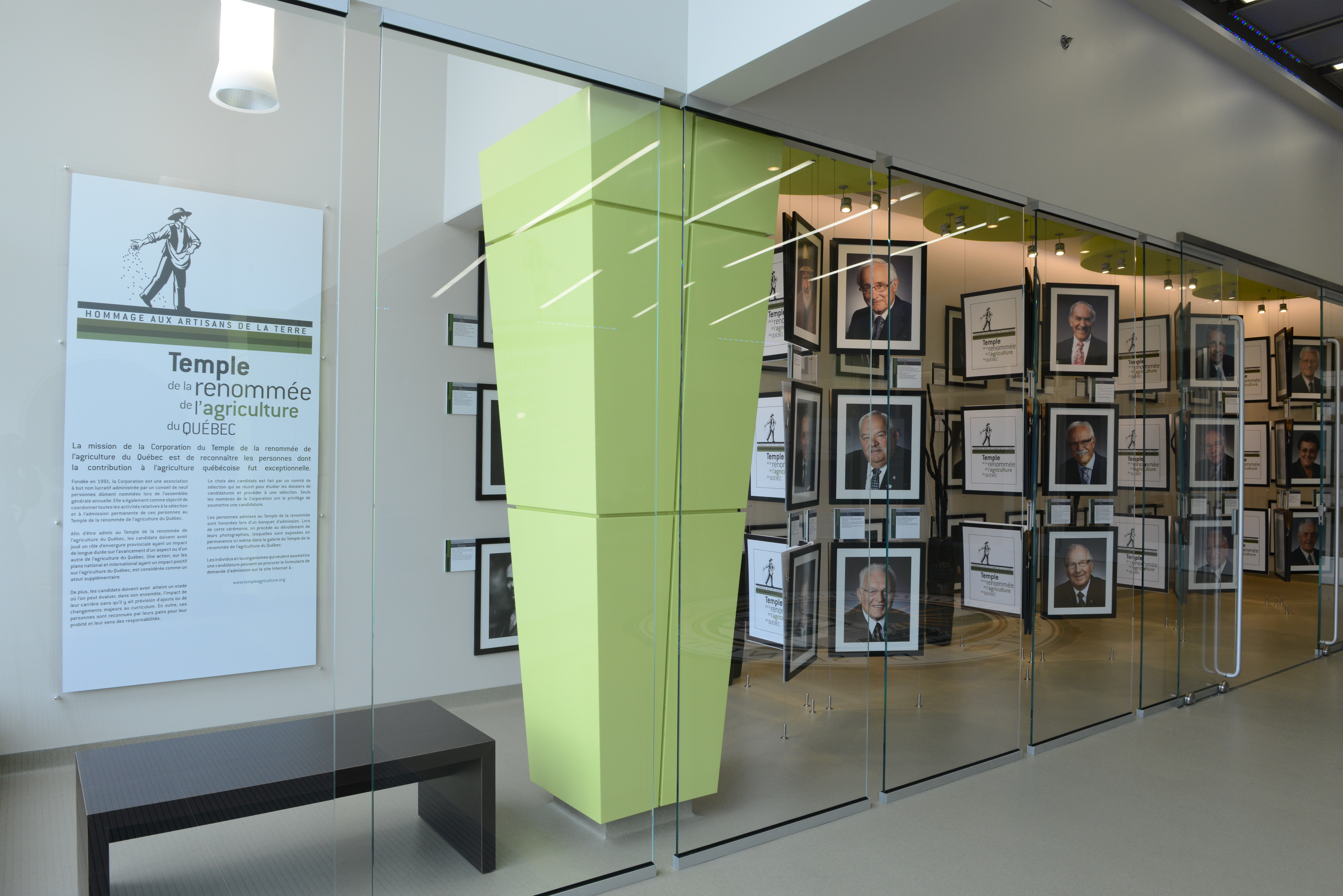
A closer view of the hall of fame

The hall of fame exposes portraits of its inductees in a gallery. The gallery used to be located at the ExpoCité complex in Quebec City but was moved to the La Coop building in Saint-Hyacinthe in 2014. Candidates for induction are submitted by member of the association who then form a selection committee. The year's inductees are honored during a banquet after the general assembly where their portraits are unveiled and permanently hung in the gallery.

== Notable inductees ==
Name	Year of induction	Profession
Alphonse Desjardins	1993	Businessman
Adélard Godbout	1992	Politician
Thomas Bassett Macaulay	1992	Actuary
Dr. Duncan McNab McEachran	1992	Veterinarian
Dr. Ernest Mercier	1992	Agronomist

== See also ==
- Canadian Agricultural Hall of Fame
- List of agriculture awards
