= Keith Downey =

Keith Downey may refer to:

- Keith Downey (agricultural scientist) (born 1927), Canadian agricultural scientist
- Keith Downey (politician) (born 1960), Minnesota politician
