= Shah Agricultural Information Library and Museum =

- শাহ্ কৃষি তথ্য পাঠাগার ও জাদুঘর
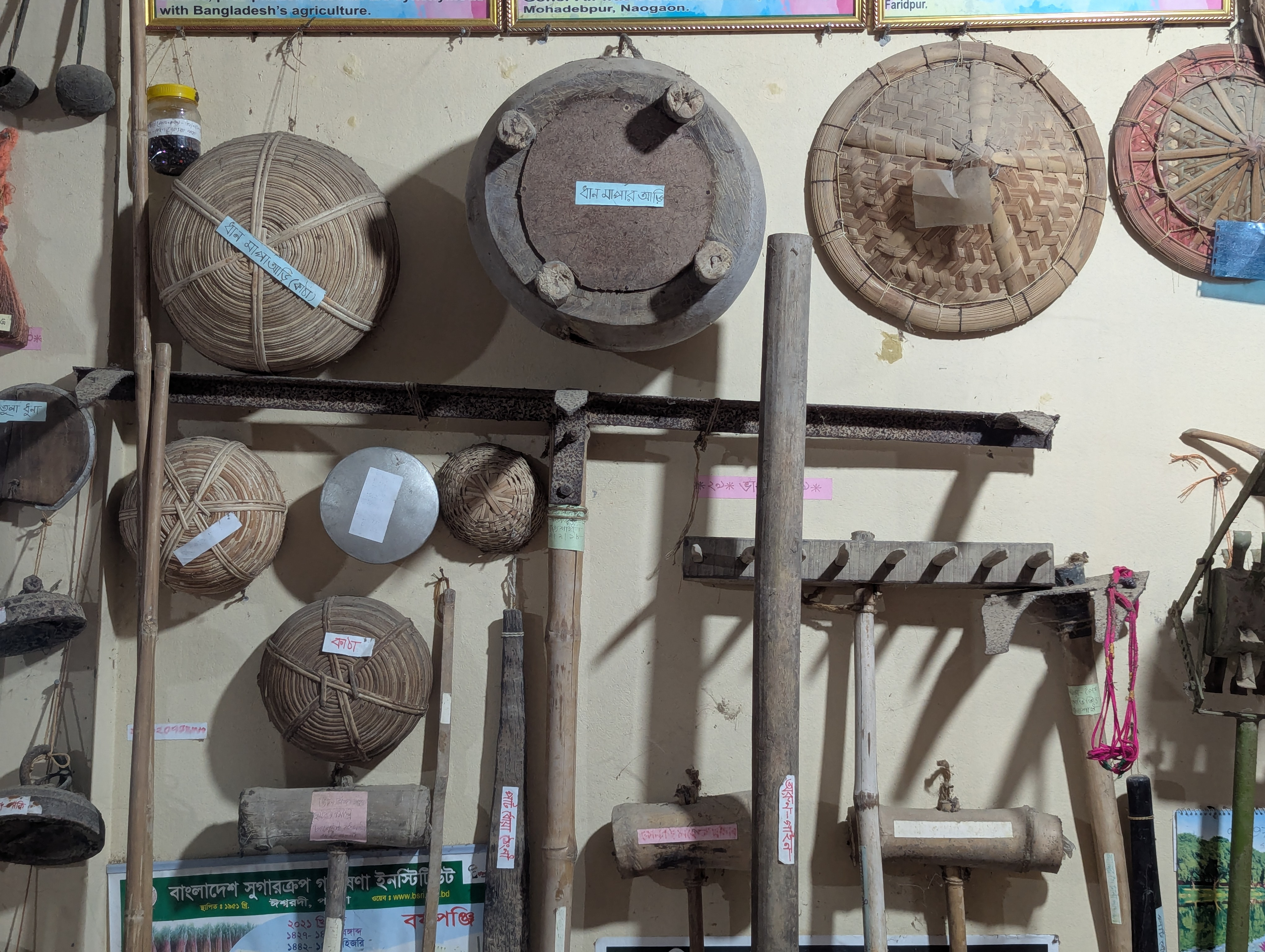
- A portion of instruments in the museum
- Established: 2008
- Location: Kaligram, Manda, Naogaon
- Type: Agricultural museum
- Founder: Jahangir Alam Shah
- Website: krishilibrary.com

Shah Agricultural Information Library and Museum was established in 2008 by a retired teacher Jahangir Alam Shah in a village of Naogaon’s Manda Upazila, named Kaligram. It is the largest private agricultural museum in Bangladesh. Alongside a library, educational, and research center, it houses around one and a half thousand ancient agricultural items and tools.

== History ==
Located 40 kilometers south of Naogaon District headquarters and 10 kilometers south of Manda Upazila Sadar, the museum began its journey on 18 April 2008 in the secluded village of Kaligram.

Initially, out of personal interest, Jahangir Alam began collecting agriculture-related books. Later, he established a library on their three-acre land. Gradually, he started gathering agricultural tools, machinery, and items used by farmers.

== Collection ==
At the beginning, Jahangir Alam established a library with his personal collection of agriculture-related books. Later, by gradually gathering agricultural tools, machinery, and items used by farmers, he developed the agricultural museum.

The library contains agriculture-related books, magazines, and research papers. In addition to fisheries, livestock rearing, herbal studies, and agriculture, it has a collection of approximately 7,500 books of various genres, including travel, stories, puzzles, and drawing books.

Among the nearly one and a half thousand ancient agricultural items in the agricultural museum are various farming tools, machinery, and items used by farmers. These include bullock cart, cow manure carrier, headgear (mathal), dheki, harrow, plough, yoke, irrigation devices, spade, sickle, broom, daul, dida, oil-press ghani, bioscope, bamboo-made fish traps, fishing tools, large earthen pots for storing rice (motki), rice threshing machine, pesticide spray machine, shallow machine, golaghar (granary), palanquin, boat, and others. The items are categorized into 50 thematic groups. Many of the agricultural tools preserved here are more than a hundred years old. Jahangir Alam collected these items from different regions of the country.

In addition, there are more than two hundred varieties of medicinal plants and over one hundred and fifty fruit trees in and around the house or museum.

== Other activities ==
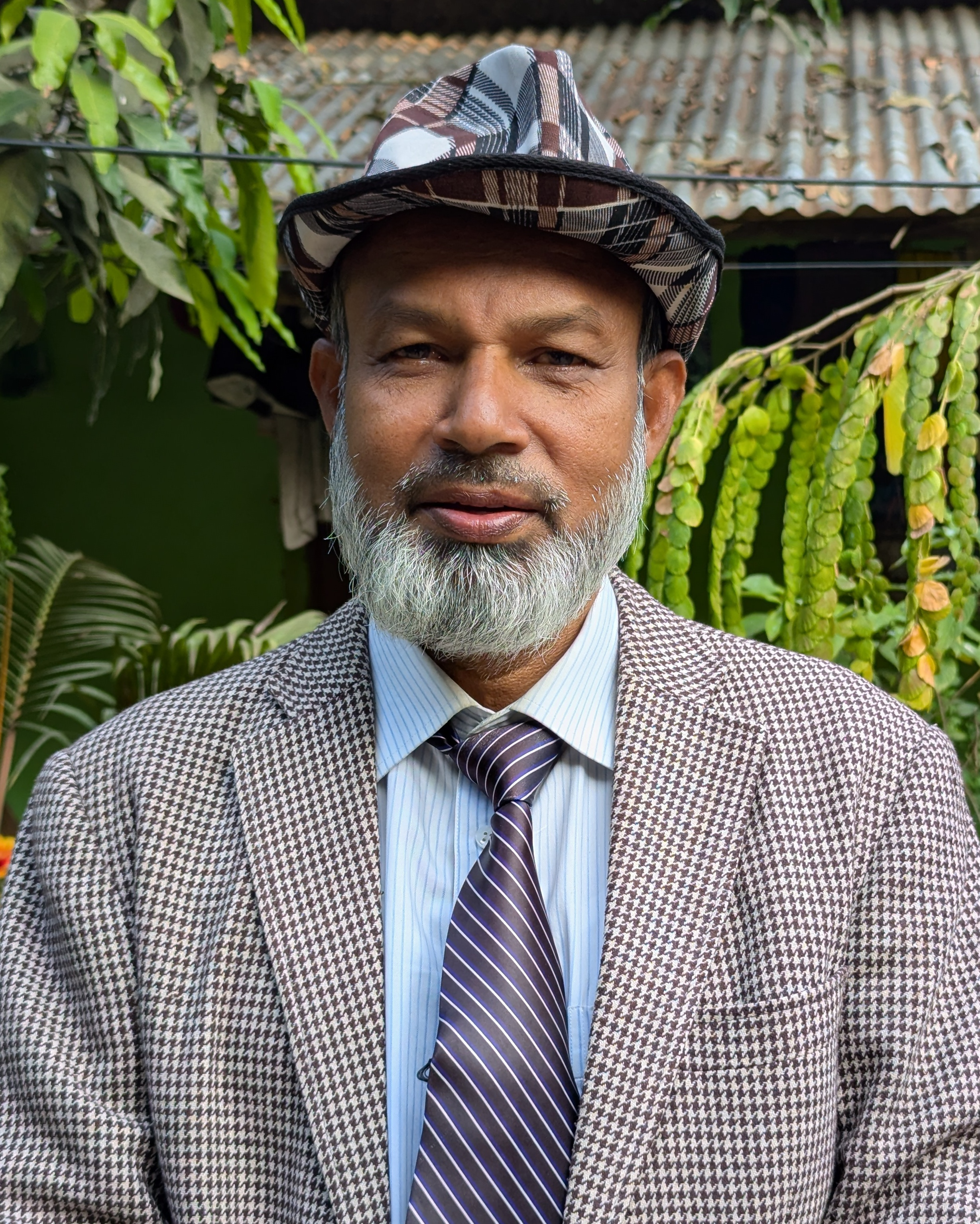
Founder Jahangir Alam Shah

In addition to the regular activities of the museum and library, arrangements are also made here for training farmers. When new innovations in agriculture emerge, these are shown to farmers in the area through a projector. In the afternoons, a children’s learning circle is held here, where underprivileged children get the opportunity to read books and listen to stories free of cost. In addition, an agricultural festival is organized every year on Pahela Baishakh, where farmers display their traditional tools and seeds. Facilities such as a seminar room and guest accommodation are also available here for researchers.

== Recognition ==
In recognition of establishing the agricultural library and museum and his contributions to the agricultural sector, entrepreneur Jahangir Alam has received several awards. Notable among these are the Rotary Bangladesh Gold Medal Award in 2011, the Bangabandhu National Agriculture Award 1420 (Bengali year), the BRRI Award conferred by the Bangladesh Rice Research Institute in 2015, and the designation of Agriculturally Important Person (AIP) by the Ministry of Agriculture in 2020.
