= Ross Butler (artist) =

Canadian artist (1907–1995)

Ross Butler (1907–1995) was a farmer, photographer, songwriter, livestock judge, cattle and poultry breeder, pioneer of cattle artificial insemination, painter and sculptor of farm animals, as well as a writer.

== Early life ==
Butler was born in 1907 in Norwich, Ontario, Canada. He was a descendant of United Empire Loyalist Colonel John Butler.

== Career ==
Butler began his career as an artist in earnest in the 1920s with a few commissioned portraits and paintings of animals. Notability came in 1939 when Butler was commissioned by the education and agriculture ministries to create a series of pictures of farm animals to be placed in schools across Canada.

The contract called for more than 500 "Standard Type" paintings of each breed of cattle, swine, horses, sheep, poultry and other Canadian livestock. Butler's unusual commission was big news. The story ran in newspapers around the world, including the National Enquirer.

Ross Butler, was known as "the world's leading livestock artist"^{1}. He created more than 500 works in his lifetime. His painting of the Springbank Snow Countess was the model for the Springbank Snow Countess monument located on Dundas Street East in Woodstock, Ontario. Another of his sculptures was at the Canadian National Exhibition in 1952. It was a life-size butter sculpture of Queen Elizabeth II and her horse, Winston, to commemorate her coronation.

Butler was a founding father of the Oxford Jersey Club, the first president and manager of the Oxford Museum, the founder of the Oxford Historical and Museum Society and the "Central Unit" – the first independent, all-breed artificial insemination facility for cattle in Canada.

He authored his autobiography, My Father's Farm.

== Awards ==
Butler's achievements as an agricultural artist were recognized posthumously in June 1997, when he was inducted into the Ontario Agricultural Hall of Fame at the Agricultural Museum in Milton, Ontario and into the Canadian Agricultural Hall of Fame in November, 1997, at the Royal Agricultural Winter Fair in Toronto.

== Exhibition History ==
February 17 to June 30, 2018, the Woodstock Art Gallery (Ontario) housed a retrospective exhibition of his life's work. The exhibition was called Ross Butler: Branding, Butter, and Bulls, and was curated by the Curatorial and Collections Assistant Samantha Purvis-Johnston. The exhibition was accompanied by a publication and its contents are found below:

Ross Butler: Branding, Butter, and Bulls

A Jersey Man

Ross Butler (1907–1997), born into a farming family in Norwich, Ontario, would begin to brand his legacy not in the art historical context but instead in the agricultural community of Oxford County. While he painted an impressive variety of livestock portraits and landscapes, his true inspiration was the Jersey cow. His fascination ignited at an early age when, after witnessing a groundbreaking sale of a Holstein cow, he convinced his father to purchase registered purebred pedigreed Jerseys for the potential of a similar windfall. The sale captured his attention and wonder about what exactly had made this cow special. Ross Butler would become the primary caretaker for his father's newly acquired livestock, and at the age of twelve he recorded their daily habits and illustrated their pedigrees.

Butler's connection with and enthusiasm for the Jersey breed would last throughout his artistic career. The artist's works were adopted in various commercial branding enterprises, including the logo for the Canadian Jersey Cattle Breeders Association (now Jersey Canada), and the trademark emblem for the Canadian Jersey Cattle Club. The designs naturally encompassed his best-known work, developing the True Type breed standards.

Pursuing Perfection

"Breed standards" designate a set of physical and functional qualities that speak to an animal's production and pedigree. Standards can vary provincially and nationally, and are defined by the incorporated association for that breed. Ross Butler was a progressive advocate for the development of Canadian breed standards in the mid-twentieth century, deviating from the use of American breed standards. The artist discovered a pattern of correlated body measurements that led to his theory of perfect animal proportions. He eventually gained eager support from various cattle, poultry, and equestrian breed associations for the adoption of these standards, though not without initial difficulty and dismissal.

Butler's True Types serve as a guide to his theory of animal proportions. Within his creative practice, animal portraiture continues to represent the greater body of his work. The True Types are evidence of his idealist and emotive affinities. Beyond perfection, Butler's paintings of animals share a unique lifelike quality and individual personality. The True Type paintings represent not one particular animal, but rather the ideal for that breed. The detail with which he built distinct characteristics is both impressive and sympathetic. This attention to detail, combined with his apparent adoration for animals, is exceptional and an important facet of Butler's life's work.

Branding Butler

Ross Butler's commissioned designs exemplify his determination and the journey of forming a legacy within the canon of agricultural art. He leveraged his strongest creation, the True Type. Following much opposition, he eventually secured a contract with the Department of Education that dispersed hundreds of thousands of his photolithographs to decorate the walls of schools across Canada. This contract would transform his cows and bulls into icons of Canada's agrarian past. Some of Butler's earliest initiatives included painted glass slides that were displayed on the Capitol Theatre's screen before the showing of each movie. This venture may not have carried fiscal gains, but that did not deter an inspired artist. He found inventive ways to continually express his creativity, like the darling "rain shoe" – a stylish art deco design that protects a walker's calf from splattered mud. The design was successfully patented by Butler and then purchased by the Dominion Rubber Company. Butler was also known to have expressed his affections through poetry and song. His tender ode from 1929, "You're My One Rose," claimed popularity but rarely involved monetary profits. He also went on to develop a number of branding assignments for various associations and businesses, including the Township of Norwich, Dawes Brewery in Quebec, and the aforementioned Jersey Canada.

The First Settler at Woodstock is an example of Ross Butler's devotion and pride in branding his legacy within the canon of Woodstock's agricultural past. From the beginning, Butler persisted with determination to build a name for himself within the context of Woodstock and Oxford County. This exhibition includes commercial enterprises that sought to reconcile the need for both self-sufficiency and artistic expression.

Exhibiting Percheron

Motivated by his painting of a black Percheron horse, Ross Butler decided to travel to Columbus, Ohio to attend the National Dairy and Percheron Show. While many of his efforts in Canada thus far seemed undervalued, this trip was certainly encouraging from its start. It began with a serendipitous connection made with the National Director of the Percheron Association. During introductions, Butler proposed that his painting be considered in the competition for the ideal type. His artwork landed at the show's entrance – visible to an audience composed of judges, professors, and breeders alike. The immediate support was unlike any typical proposals and became particularly rewarding. Presenting his theory of animal proportions at the National Percheron Show resulted in a commission to paint the True Types of the breed. Butler returned home from the Columbus show in confident triumph. The commission also included quarter-scale Percheron statues – a medium not yet investigated by Butler. From clay dug from the banks of the Otter Creek swimming hole on his father's farm in Norwich, Butler's model would gain eager approval from the True Type Percheron committee. Gaining approval from the Canadian committee, however, was much more strenuous. Nevertheless, this new medium and the artist's theory of proportions were naturally leading him to new and exciting opportunities. Ross Butler's agricultural art has seeped into all corners of the rural community; however, his creative initiatives exhibited at the fair were widely recognized during his lifetime.

At the Fair

Over 250 years ago, in 1765, Canada held its first fair in Windsor, Nova Scotia. Since then, Canadian fairs have become a conventional community feature in many cities, reaching to the west coast. For Ross Butler, the fairgrounds were exciting, rewarding, and undoubtedly the cultural hub for agricultural communities. His involvement at the fairs started at a young age when he was employed to watch over the cattle for his neighbour, Beryl Hanmer, at the Guelph Winter Fair in 1922. To his amazement, the fair showed thousands of breeds of animals, rewarding an educational experience that surely inspired his calling. His childhood delight for the fair never waned. Among many others, Ross Butler participated at both the Canadian National Exhibition (CNE) and the Royal Agricultural Winter Fair (RAWF). His contribution respectfully illustrated his dual attendance in the agricultural community: through his livestock rearing and his artistic makings.

The CNE was first hosted in 1879 and continues to exhibit current technologies, consumer innovations, and creative ingenuities from the nation's leading industrialists and artists. Livestock fairs showcase thousands of animal breeds, highlighting the most desired traits associated with the purpose of breed reproduction. Inaugurated in 1922, the RAWF is the largest indoor combined agricultural fair and competition in the world. It is held annually in the Coliseum at Exhibition Place in Toronto, excluding the nine years of Canada's participation in WWII. Cancelling the CNE and the RAWF during WWII resulted in the founding of the All Canadian Holstein contest in 1942, sponsored by the Holstein Journal. Inspired by the All-American awards, the All Canadian celebrates the best animals in each class and shows cattle exclusively bred in Canada.

Ross Butler's All Canadian Holsteins – The Cattle upon the Thousand Hills (1976), shows the best of the breed in each class from 1975. Like many of his works, it serves as a guide for breeders to consult when mastering their herd standards. The painting captures the impressive parade of living Holsteins and represents the artist's fortitude and passion for celebrating the animals' excellence through equally excellent representations. Like many of his imagined animals, the All Canadian Holsteins, each uniquely patterned, have separate personalities and a character of their own, since they are portraits of living animals.

Only one year prior, Ross Butler painted the captivating Royal Review (1974) for the RAWF. Departing from his typical portraiture, Butler assembled a vision of champions heading to the fair. The group portrait assumes a wonderfully imaginative scenario with multiple vanishing points that suggest a journey, but one with no distinct start or finish. Since the painting proved favourable to the thousands of fair attendees, Butler found an excited audience to purchase his reproductions. The popularity of the Royal Review drew hundreds of visitors to Woodstock, and the reproductions continue to enjoy similar success.

Building with Butter

Butler's arguably most recognized involvement at the fairs were his butter sculptures at the Canadian National Exhibition (CNE) and the Royal Agricultural Winter Fair (RAWF). The artist was amused by the concept of a cow made from butter – a reversal of nature. Over his lifetime, Ross impressively formed more than ten life-size sculptures featuring both Canadian and agricultural icons. The most renowned of them, Queen Elizabeth on her Horse Winston, sculpted in 1952 for the CNE, garnered international fame and awarded Ross the trip of a lifetime to England to take part as a media presence at the Queen's coronation.

Evidence of these works existing in archives are rare, yet photographs remain in the holdings at the Ross Butler Gallery in Woodstock, and news footage was recently discovered in the Sherman Grinberg Film Library in Los Angeles. The Pathe Warner News footage allows the viewer to experience a rare and intimate movement of Ross shaping the Queen's nose. A moment like this lasts to provide an example of Butler's reverence in the eyes of the agricultural community.

Collection Legacy

Ross Butler's agricultural art can be found in archives, classrooms, museums, galleries, and the homes of Woodstock and Oxford County residents. The scope of Butler's career is complex and multifaceted – a journey comparable to the ups and downs of many creative individuals. Butler strove to build a legacy by creating his own opportunities, and his perseverance is inspiring. When faced with challenges, he shaped his achievements and forged a path to success. His practice of collecting and holding the rights to his own images was intentional in building the prominence of his collection. The collection is now maintained and cared for by his only son, David Butler.

This exhibition assembles a collection of varied images and mediums that confirm the artist's character in the making of his success. Ross Butler's art, by many, is "considered a science that will forever hold a significant place in the history of agricultural art."

Whatever the challenge, Butler humbly yet enthusiastically persisted. The artist married his artistic talent with his adoration for animals by producing his standard types, achieving status and eventual support from the global agricultural community. He built his reputation by working hard as an independent artist, collaborating with businesses and associations, refining his moulding abilities, and avidly collecting his life's work. Both his commercial initiatives and artistic pursuits offer evidence of Ross Butler as an idealist inventor and a visionary artist.

At the Woodstock Art Gallery

Branding, Butter, and Bulls surveys the journey of an artist navigating the ebbs and flows of an artist's career. It is a story of ideas, a marathon of dreams tempered by the realizations of the pressures of life, family, location, and financial limitations. By bringing together a multitude of works, the exhibition reveals the life of an artist whose ideals were not eclipsed by the struggles of balancing profitability and nourishing creativity.

For a multitude of reasons, this self-taught artist, who demonstrated a particular talent, was not included in the traditional artistic canon of historical Canadian art production. As an active member in the agricultural community, Ross Butler painted what he knew – livestock. Departing from the dominant abstract expressionism of his time, he was instead drawn towards hyperrealism, idealism, and perfect proportions. His artistic motivations were driven by perceptions of truth and beauty and a genuine admiration for his animals, fostered since his childhood on the farm. In an early journal entry, he recalls a memory that defines the genesis of his creative muse: "...it was my habit to be up early and my father would send me into the pasture to fetch Daisy, the Jersey family cow."

Samantha Purvis-Johnston Curatorial and Collections Assistant 449 Dundas Street Woodstock ON N4S 1C2 519.539.6761 woodstockartgallery.ca

BIBLIOGRAPHY Simpson, Pamela H. "Butter Cows and Butter Ladies." In Corn Palaces and Butter Queens: A History of Crop Art and Dairy Sculpture. Minneapolis: University of Minnesota Press, 2012. The Royal Agricultural Winter Fair. Accessed Oct. & Nov. 2017. http://www.royalfair.org/. Holstein Canada. 2018. Accessed Nov. & Dec. 2017. https://www.holstein.ca/en/Public. Butler, David. Ross Butler Gallery. Accessed Nov. & Dec. 2017. http://www.rossbutler.gallery/. Cooper, Bonnie E., ed. "Shows and All-Canadians." Compiled by Bruce N. Murchison. Holstein Canada: Century of Achievement, 132–38. Crawford-Siano, Irene. Journey to perfection: the agricultural art of Ross Butler. Kingston, Ont.: Quarry Press, 1997. "Dawes Black Horse Collection." Black Horse. August 7, 2013. Accessed Oct. & Nov. 2017. http://villedemtl.ca/pourboireilfautvendre/en/3_0/dawes_black_horse_collection. "History." Canadian National Exhibition. 2018. Accessed Nov. & Dec. 2017. https://theex.com/footer/about-the-cne/history/. "Inductee Details: Ross Butler." Canadian Agricultural Hall of Fame. Accessed Nov. & Dec. 2017. http://www.cahfa.com/en-us/inductees/ross-butler. Lewington, Peter. Canada's Holsteins. Edited by Frank English. Markham, ON: Fitzhenry & Whiteside Limited, 1983. World News: The Queen is sculpted in butter. Performed by Ross Butler. Warner Pathe News, 1952. Accessed from the Sherman Grinberg Film Library, 2018.

ILLUSTRATED WORKS

All works: Ross Butler. Dimensions in cm height x width x length. Cover Image All Canadian Holsteins, c. 1976. Oil on Masonite, 122 x 244. 1 Jersey Cow, c. 1934. Pastel on Paper, 61 x 91.5. 2 Jersey Bull, c. 1934. Pastel on Paper, 61 x 91.5. 3 Jersey Canada Logo, 1981. Oil on two-tiered Masonite, 66 dia. 4 Black Horse (Dawes Brewery Commission), c. 1940. Hand-painted plaster, 48 x 28 x 48. 5 Percheron Stallion, 1938. Oil on Canvas, 76 x 91.5. 6 Percheron Mare, 1938. Oil on Canvas, 76 x 91.5. 7 Royal Review, c. 1974. Oil on Masonite, 122 x 244

== Death ==
He died in 1995 at his 100-acre (0.40 km^{2}) studio-art gallery-farm in Oxford County, south of Woodstock, on Highway #59. Today, the Butler studio-art gallery-farm is operated by his son, David Butler.
