= Charles Ambrose Zavitz =

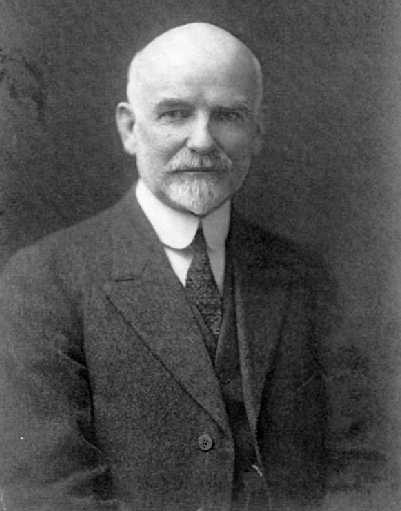
Charles Ambrose Zavitz

Charles Ambrose Zavitz (1863–1942) was a Canadian agronomist.

He was born in 1863 in Coldstream, Canada West, into a family that was a combination of both Quakers and United Empire Loyalists.

Upon graduation in 1886 from the Ontario Agricultural College in Guelph, Ontario, the college hired him as a junior chemist, promoted him in 1888 to Assistant Superintendent of Experiments, and again in 1904 to head the new department of Field Husbandry.

Zavitz revitalized the Ontario Agricultural and Experimental Union. "By 1924 more than 100,000 farmers were conducting various experiments on their farms. Ontario's crop yields were increased exponentially by using the Union to distribute his experimental materials throughout the province."

In 1916, the University of Toronto recognized Zavitz with an honorary Doctor of Science degree for his research and for his peace activism. "Charles was the founder of the Canadian Peace and Arbitration Society, Canada's first peace group...." Zavitz was the acting president of the college at the beginning of World War I, and refused to let the militia recruit or drill on campus, causing quite a stir among local militarists.

Similarly, when the local tobacco growers approached the college to conduct experiments for their benefit, Zavitz refused because he could not, as a Quaker, take resources away from food production to waste on an unhealthy pleasure like tobacco use.

Zavitz pioneered the development of soybeans for commercial use in Ontario, and also enhanced yields in potatoes, alfalfa, sugar beets, peas, grain and field beans, but most notably in barley. He perfected OAC #21 barley which accounted for a majority of barley planted in Canada for almost 40 years. The Canadian Brewer's Association found it was a superb barley for the malting process and wanted to present Zavitz with an award, but he would not accept it in public. In 1923 he developed the first cold tolerant Soybean, which decades later would become popular among farmers and economically significant.

Zavitz retired from the university in 1927, and became the first chairman of the Canadian Friends Service Committee in 1931.

His other accolades include:

- Honorary Doctor of Laws degree from the University of Western Ontario;
- First Canadian to be named a Fellow of the American Society of Agronomy;
- Honorary Fellow of the American Association for the Advancement of Science;
- Honorary Fellow of the Canadian Society of Technical Agronomists;
- Co-founder of the Canadian Seed Growers Association;
- Inducted posthumously into the Canadian Agricultural Hall of Fame in 1974;
- Inducted posthumously into the Ontario Agricultural Hall of Fame in 1984;
- Inducted posthumously into the Western Fair Hall of Fame in 2010;
- Honorary Doctor of Science degree from the University of Guelph.
