= Duncan McNab McEachran =

Canadian academic (1841–1924)

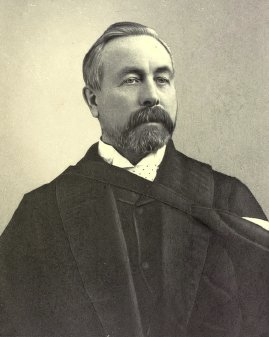
- Born: 27 October 1841; Campbeltown, Scotland
- Died: 13 October 1924 (aged 82); Ormstown, Quebec
- Occupations: veterinarian, professor, author, school administrator, inspector, and stockbreeder

Duncan McNab McEachran (27 October 1841 – 13 October 1924) was a Scottish born Canadian veterinarian and academic.

Born in Campbeltown, Scotland, the son of David McEachran and Jean Blackney, McEachran graduated from the Edinburgh Veterinary College in 1861 and received his license to practice from Royal College of Veterinary Surgeons. In 1862, he emigrated to Canada West, settling in Woodstock. In 1863, he helped set up, along with primary founder Andrew Smith, the Upper Canada Veterinary School (later the Ontario Veterinary College). McEachran was a staff member but he considered the admission standards and academic requirements to be inadequate. He left after three years, moving to Montreal. In 1867, Smith and McEachran again joined forces to publish the first veterinary textbook in Canada for farmers, The Canadian horse and his diseases.

In 1866, McEachran assisted in the founding of the Montreal Veterinary College, including a French section in 1877, which became linked with McGill College, with its more advanced medical training facilities. By 1889, the relationship had been formalized. The college then became the Faculty of Comparative Medicine and Veterinary Science of McGill University.

McEachran helped develop sanitary measures to counter epidemics in animals and made many trips to the US to study the prevention and treatment of such epidemics, particularly among horses. In 1885 he became the first chief veterinary inspector for Canada. In the late 1880s he helped establish two large horse breeding ranches in Alberta and then provided management for others from his home in Montreal.

For his contribution to the field of agriculture in the province of Quebec and in Canada, McEachran was posthumously inducted to Canadian Agricultural Hall of Fame in 1962 and to the Agricultural Hall of Fame of Quebec in 1992. He was named a National Historic Person by the federal government in 2016.
