= Canadian Agricultural Hall of Fame =

Canadian not-for-profit organization

Coordinates: 43.635112°N 79.411197°W

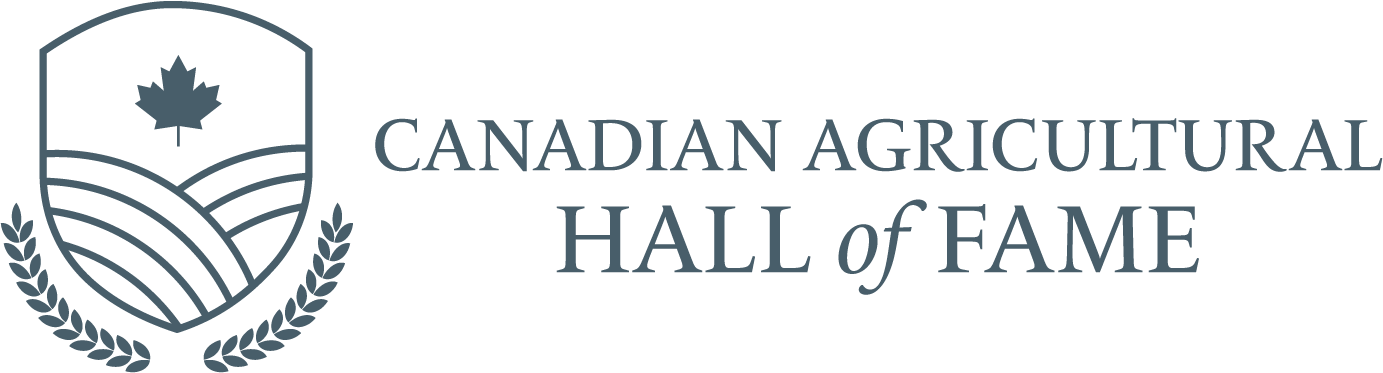
- Abbreviation: CAHFA
- Formation: 1960
- Type: not-for-profit
- Purpose: Hall of Fame
- Location: Toronto, Ontario, Canada
- Website: http://www.cahfa.com/

The Canadian Agricultural Hall of Fame (French: Temple canadien de la renommée agricole) honors and celebrates Canadians who have made outstanding contributions to the agriculture and food industry and publicizes the importance of their achievements throughout Canada.

Inaugurated in 1960 and located in Toronto, Ontario, the temple is currently administered by an association comprising a board of 12 directors; three each from Eastern Canada, Western Canada, Ontario and the rest of the country.

== Gallery ==
Previous logo

Since 1960, the Royal Agricultural Winter Fair in Toronto has been home to the gallery where the association displays portraits of its inductees along with their biographical notes. The gallery is open to the public during the fair in November but can only be visited by appointment during the rest of the year. In 1995–1996, the gallery moved to a more permanent home at the National Trade Center.

== Induction ceremony ==
The association chooses at the most three inductees each year for all the nominations is receives. During the November Agricultural Fair in Toronto, an induction dinner and portrait unveiling ceremony is held where the life and accomplishments of the year's inductees are celebrated.

== Notable inductees ==
Name	Year of induction	Province
John Edward Brownlee	1963	Alberta
Patrick Burns	1963	Alberta
Ross Butler	1997	Ontario
Robert Bertram Church	1991	Alberta
Keith Downey	2002	Ontario
Ernest Charles Drury	1971	Ontario
John Dryden	1963	Ontario
Christian Jensen	1962	Alberta
James Garfield Gardiner	1962	Saskatchewan
Adélard Godbout	1962	Quebec
Harry Hays	1983	Alberta
George Stewart Henry	1963	Ontario
Thomas Laird Kennedy	1962	Ontario
Charles Mayer	2005	Manitoba
Duncan McNab McEachran	1961	Quebec
James Duncan McGregor	1961	Manitoba
Archibald J. McLean	1963	Alberta
Dr. Ernest Mercier	1991	Quebec
William Richard Motherwell	1962	Saskatchewan
Robert R. Ness	1962	Quebec
Daniel Edward Riley	1965	Alberta
Charles E. Saunders	1987	Ontario
Donald Shaver	1986	New Brunswick
Walter Russell Shaw	1980	Prince Edward Island
Cyril Sherwood	1986	New Brunswick
Baldur R. Stefansson	2002	Manitoba
William Atcheson Stewart	1988	Ontario
Lyle Vanclief	2014	Ontario
Eugene Whelan	2001	Ontario
Charles Ambrose Zavitz	1974	Ontario

== See also ==
- Agricultural Hall of Fame of Quebec
- List of agriculture awards
