= Rao Bahadur Ramanath Iyer Award =

The Rao Bahadur Ramanath Iyer Award was instituted to promote the cotton research work, in India. This is being bestowed by the Indian Society for Cotton Improvement. Mumbai. Ramanath Iyer was a prominent cotton breeder in Tamil Nadu, during the early part of 20th Century.

== See also ==
- List of agriculture awards
