= List of agriculture awards =

This list of agriculture awards is an index to articles about notable awards given for contributions to agriculture. Awards may be limited to people from the country in which they are given or may be open to contributions worldwide.

== Awards ==
| Country | Award | Sponsor | Notes |
|---|---|---|---|
| Australia | Farrer Medal | Farrer Memorial Trust | Farrer Memorial Oration, to be given by a person with an agricultural background |
| Bangladesh | National Agriculture Awards | Ministry of Agriculture | Substantial contribution in the field of research in agricultural development |
| Canada | Agricultural Hall of Fame of Quebec | Agricultural Hall of Fame of Quebec | Lasting contribution to the advancement of the field of agriculture in the province of Quebec, Canada |
| Canada | Canadian Agricultural Hall of Fame | Canadian Agricultural Hall of Fame | Canadians who have made outstanding contributions to the agriculture and food industry |
| Chile | National Prize for Applied Sciences and Technologies | CONICYT | Scientist whose work in the respective field of knowledge makes him worthy of said distinction |
| India | Borlaug Award | Coromandel International | Outstanding Indian scientists for their research and contributions in the field of agriculture and environment |
| India | Rafi Ahmed Kidwai Award | Indian Council of Agricultural Research | Indian researchers in the agricultural field |
| India | Rao Bahaddur Ramanath Iyer Award | Indian Society for Cotton Improvement | Cotton research work in India |
| India | Swamy Sahajanand Saraswati Extension Scientist/ Worker Award | Indian Council of Agricultural Research | Outstanding achievements in the field of agricultural education research |
| India | Udyan Pandit Award | National Horticultural Board | Excellence in fruit cultivation in India |
| India | Om Prakash Bhasin Award | Shri Om Prakash Bhasin Foundation | Excellence in the areas of science and technology |
| India | VASVIK Industrial Research Award | VASVIK | Excellence in industrial research in the areas of science and technology |
| India | Agricola Medal | Food and Agriculture Organization | Exceptional contributions to global food security, agricultural development, nutrition, and poverty reduction |
| International | Norman Borlaug Award for Field Research and Application | Borlaug Dialogue / World Food Prize | Researchers under 40 who emulate the scientific innovation and dedication to food security of Dr. Norman Borlaug |
| International | Borlaug Medallion | World Food Prize Foundation | |
| International | World Agriculture Prize | Global Confederation of Higher Education Associations for the Agricultural and Life Sciences | Encourage the development of the mission of higher education institutions in education, research, innovation, and outreach in the agricultural and life sciences by recognizing the distinguished contribution of individuals to this mission |
| International | World Food Prize | World Food Prize Foundation | Contributions in any field involved in the world food supply: food and agriculture science and technology, manufacturing, marketing, nutrition, economics, poverty alleviation, political leadership, and the social sciences |
| Israel | Wolf Prize in Agriculture | Wolf Foundation | Agriculture |
| United Kingdom | Bledisloe Gold Medal for Landowners | Royal Agricultural Society of England | Outstanding achievement in the successful land management and development of an English agricultural estate |
| United Kingdom | Veitch Memorial Medal | Royal Horticultural Society | Outstanding contribution to the advancement and improvement of the science and practice of horticulture |
| United Kingdom | Victoria Medal of Honour | Royal Horticultural Society | British horticulturists resident in the United Kingdom |

== See also ==
- Lists of awards
- Lists of science and technology awards
- List of cannabis competitions
