= Artificial Insemination Centre of Quebec =

- Native name: Centre d'Insémination Artificielle du Québec
- Company type: Limited Partnership
- Industry: Agriculture
- Founded: 1947
- Founder: Government of Quebec
- Headquarters: Saint-Hyacinthe, Quebec, Canada
- Number of locations: 2
- Products: Bovine semen
- Services: Semen bank, artificial insemination, agronomical research
- Number of employees: 320
- Website: http://www.ciaq.com

The Artificial Insemination Centre of Quebec (French: Centre d'Insémination artificielle du Québec) (CIAQ) is a limited partnership society founded in 1948 located in Saint-Hyacinthe, Quebec, Canada with the mission of improving through artificial insemination bovine herds used in milk and meat production throughout the province. The CIAQ is currently the sole bovine sperm production facility in Quebec and is the property of the Milk Producers of Quebec (PLQ), the Quebec Council of Milk Producing Breeds (CQRL) and the Provincial Council of Cattle Amelioration Clubs (CPCAB).

The CIAQ provides cattle farmers with bulls from the Ayrshire, Canadienne, Holstein, Jersey and Brown Swiss milk producing breeds along with other beef breeds. Around 800,000 doses of semen from the CIAQ's banks are used yearly by farmers in Quebec, Nova Scotia and around the world through the Semex Alliance, of which the CIAQ is a founding partner with a 45% stake.

== History ==
At the beginning of the 1940s, the provincial government of Quebec was becoming increasingly conscious of the poor yields of milk cattle in most farms. For those at the ministry of agriculture, the then new technique of artificial insemination appeared to be an economical and quick method to improve the province's herds, lower production costs and increase revenues. Lacking the required expertise in its own ranks, the government hired Ernest Mercier, a young agronomist, to complete graduate studies in Cornell University in New York in the field and develop the technique in Quebec. His studies completed, Dr. Mercier founded in 1947 what would later become the CIAQ, whose first insemination was conducted the 29 April 1948.

From its inception, the CIAQ's main challenge was to set up and maintain an insemination network, implementing a strategy of encouraging farmers organizing themselves in cattle breeding clubs to promote and manage artificial insemination under its oversight. The goal was to provide the CIAQ with herds to test young bulls for potential selection and data from milk producing facility to confirm the success of the offspring of artificially inseminated cows at increasing milk production. The CIAQ also conducted research and experimentation to improve artificial insemination techniques, semen conditioning and set up programs for testing young bulls for possible inclusion in its sperm bank.

During its history, the CIAQ underwent several organizational changes. From 1948 to 1981, it was a division of the Ministry of Agriculture, Fisheries and Food of Quebec. Due to increasing demands for its products, it became evident that the CIAQ could no longer be publicly managed by the ministry so in 1981, it was transferred to the now defunct Société Québécoise d'Initiatives Agro-Alimentaires (SOQUIA) a state-owned corporation. In 1997, the CIAQ teamed-up with three others insemination centres in Canada to form the Semex Alliance whose role is to promote Canadian cattle breeding solutions on the international scene. Finally, in 1999, the CIAQ was bought by the PLQ, the CQRL and the CPCAB and became the limited partnership that is it today.

== Genetic improvement program ==
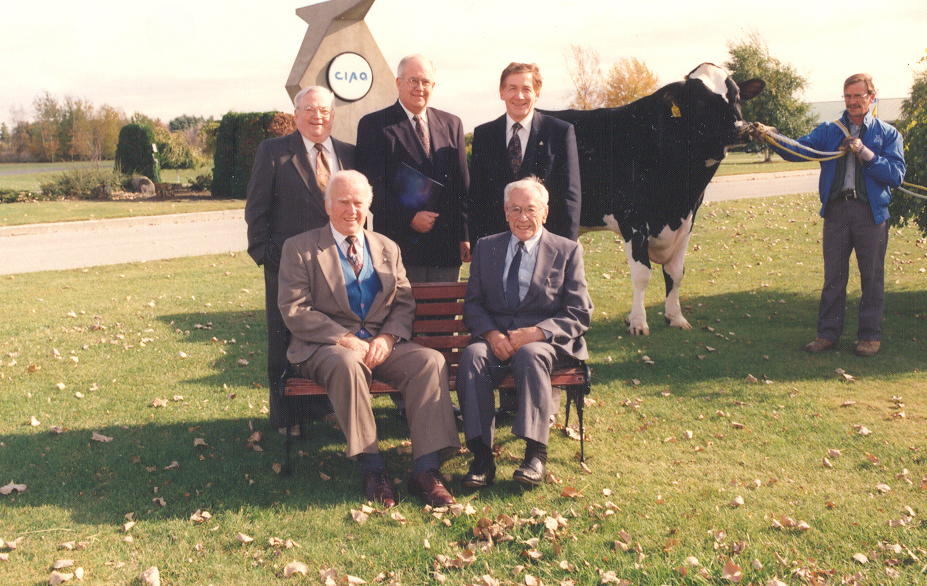
Startmore Rudolph at the CIAQ. Dr. Ernest Mercier, the founder of the centre, is sitting on the left.

The genetic improvement of milk and beef producing cattle is at the foundation of the CIAQ's mission. In order to be able to offer producers quality bulls with a known pedigree, a program to test young bulls for becoming potential sperm donors was put together in 1967. When the program was launched, only 3% of Quebec's milk producing cows were registered with a milk quality tracking program and were generating data eligible for consideration in a genetic evaluation initiative. This number has increased to reach 53% today.

Through efforts from the CIAQ, breed associations, the Ministry of Agriculture for promoting genetic testing programs and the cooperation of farmers for testing young potential bulls, 50% of bulls are now tested for inclusion in the CIAQ's sperm banks. Countless bulls have been identified for breeding over the years with some of them reaching fame outside of agricultural field such as Hanoverhill Starbuck, who has fathered at least 200,000 cows throughout the world and can be found in the genealogy of 95% of Canada's Holstein breed cows.

== Company ==
The CIAQ is divided between two complexes, one in Saint-Hyacinthe, opened in 1948 and currently its head office and one in Sainte-Madeleine opened in 1985. In total, the CIAQ houses 670 bulls and keeps in its inventory approximately 11,500,000 doses of semen.
