= Swamy Sahajanand Saraswati Extension Scientist/ Worker Award =

Swamy Sahajanand Saraswati Extension Scientist/ Worker Award is awarded by Indian Council of Agricultural Research which was instituted in honour of Swami Sahajanand Saraswati. The award, instituted in 1995, is presented for outstanding achievements in the field of agricultural education research.

The Swami Sahajanand Saraswati extension scientist/worker award for the biennium 2003–2004 was conferred on Ravindra Kumar Sohane of Krishi Vigyan Kendra, Beguserai, Bihar; S C Pramanik of Krishi Vigyan Kendra, CARI, Port Blair; and P. Anitha Kumari for extension work in resource management.

In 2007, Swami Sahajanand Saraswati Extension Scientist Worker Award was given to two scientists for crop production and one each for livestock production, resource management and home science.

== See also ==
- List of agriculture awards
