= National Horticulture Board =

Indian government agency

The National Horticulture Board
- राष्ट्रीय बागवानी बोर्ड
- Parent Agency - Ministry of Agriculture & Farmer's Welfare

- National Horticulture Board

Agency overview
- Formed: 30 April 1984
- Jurisdiction: Union Government of India
- Headquarters: Gurugram, Haryana
- Employees: 23
- Annual budget: ₹643 million (US$6.9 million)
- Agency executive: S.P. Mukerji, Chairperson
- Website: www.nhb.gov.in

The National Horticulture Board (NHB) of India is an organization under the Ministry of Agriculture & Farmers Welfare, It serves as to encourage horticulture, aiding farmers, and increasing crop productivity and profitability in India.

== History ==
It was established in 1984, as an autonomous society under the Societies Registration Act 1860. to address the importance of horticulture in India's agriculture. Established to advance horticultural development, spanning production, post-harvest management, and marketing.
