= Ernest Mercier (agronomist) =

Dr. Ernest Mercier OC
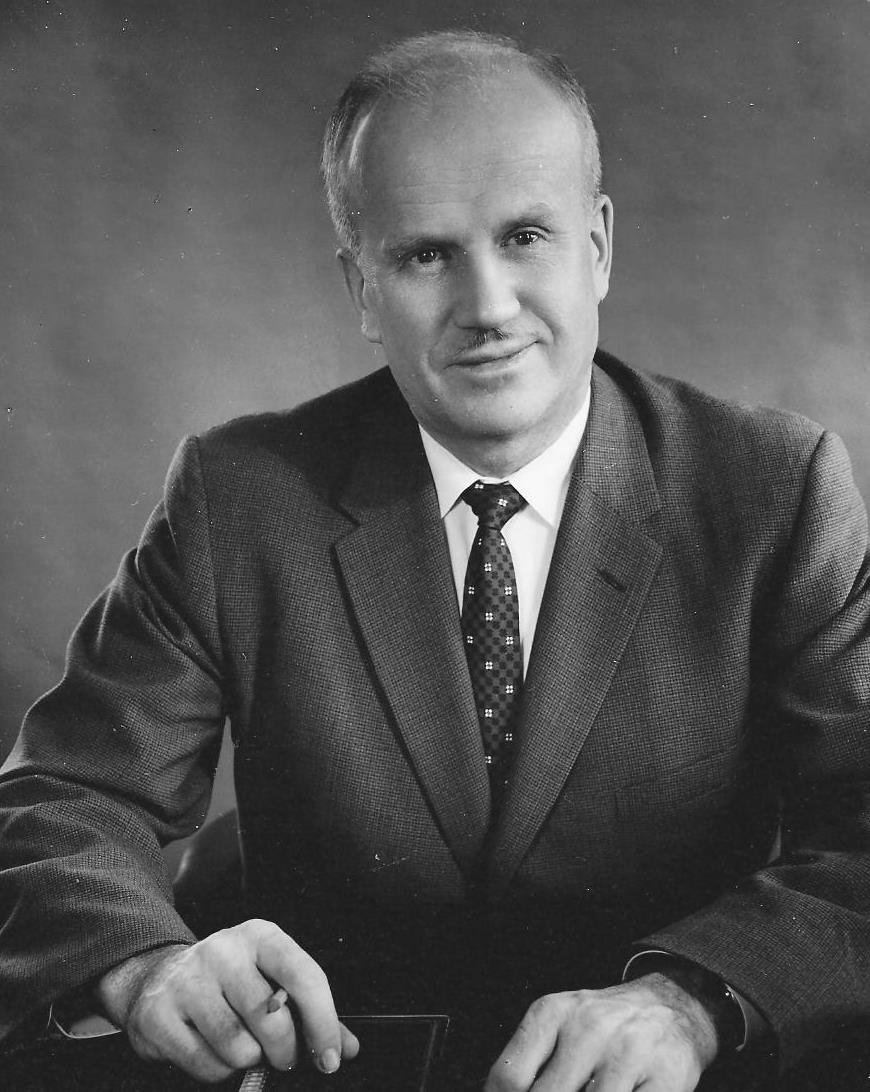
- Official portrait of Dr. Mercier while deputy minister of agriculture
- Born: March 1, 1914; Notre-Dame-du-Rosaire, Quebec, Canada
- Died: March 4, 2002 (aged 88); Quebec City, Quebec, Canada
- Resting place: La Souvenance
- Education: Cornell University, Ithaca, New York, United States
- Occupations: Agronomist, public servant, genealogist
- Spouse: Marcelle Normand (1945-2002)
- Children: 6
- Awards: Order of Canada, Ordre du Mérite agricole du Québec, Commandeur de l'ordre du Mérite agronomique, Lazzaro Spallanzani Medal

Dr. Ernest Mercier, OC (1 March 1914 – 4 March 2002) was a reputed agronomist in Quebec, Canada. Born on a family farm in Notre-Dame-du-Rosaire, he went on to do graduate studies in Cornell University and founded the Artificial Insemination Center of Quebec. After many years as the superintendent at a federal research farm, he was promoted deputy minister of agriculture of Quebec, a position which he held for 6 years. Retiring from his government work, he became a private consultant and collaborated with the Canadian International Development Agency and the Canadian delegation at the Food and Agriculture Organization on projects that took him around the world.

Mercier has been credited among other things with the implementation of innovative agrifood policies that transformed the family farm of the past into the efficient and profitable modern operation of today. For his contribution to the agriculture and the field of agronomy, Dr. Mercier was made an Officer of the Order of Canada in 1989 and inducted to the Canadian Agricultural Hall of Fame in 1991 and the Agricultural Hall of Fame of Quebec in 1992.

== Early life and education ==
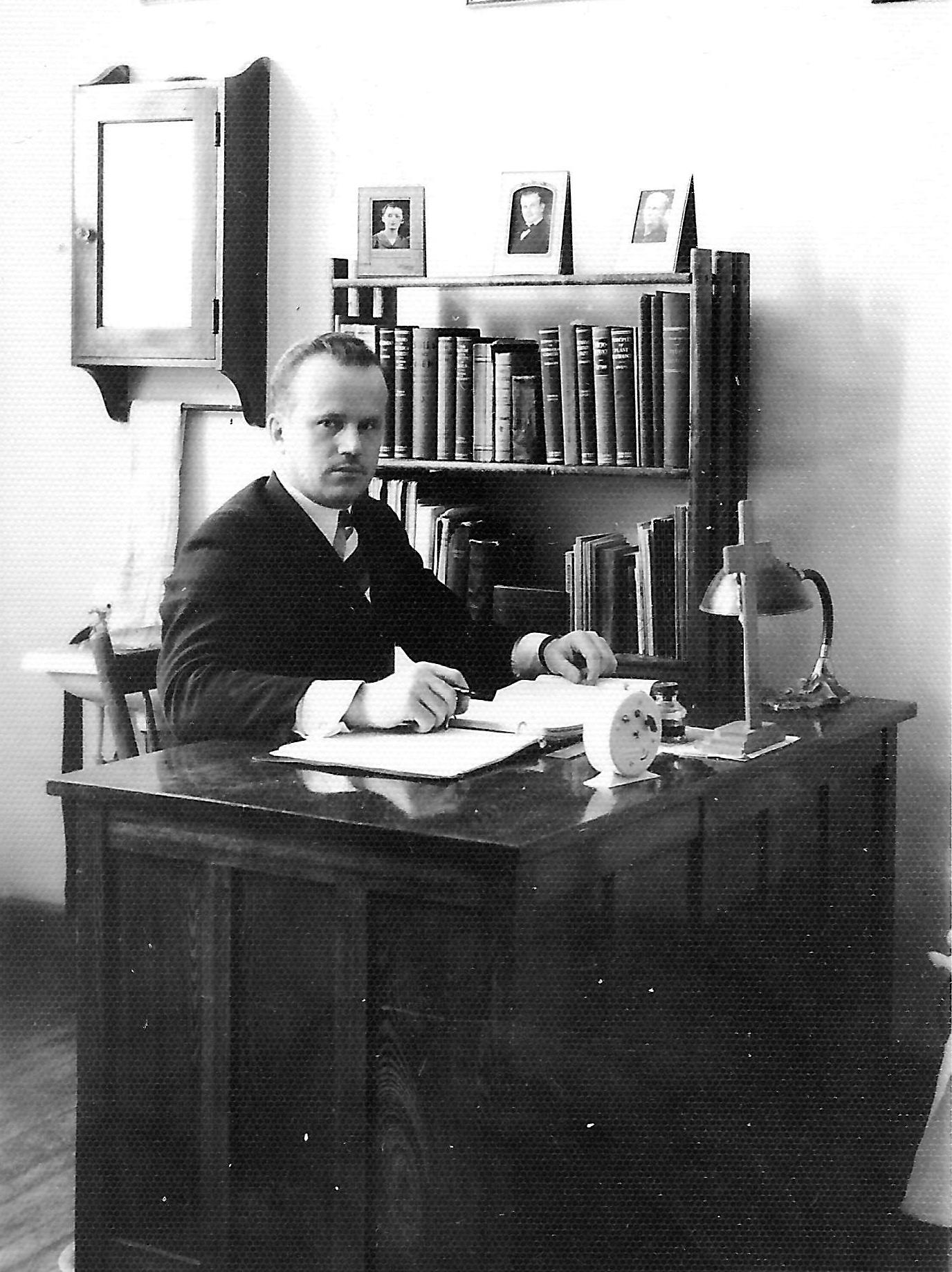
Ernest Mercier in La Pocatière

Born in 1914, Mercier was the 12th of 13 children of Georges Mercier and Williamine Dion, then subsistence farmers in Notre-Dame-du-Rosaire. From 1920 to 1928, he went to the local primary and secondary school but had to quit due to the Great Depression to work on the family farm and in forestry. Ernest had shown good potential at school so as soon as the economy permitted, his whole family gathered funds to send him back to further his education. He attended college in Nicolet from 1933 to 1939 and went on to complete a B.Sc from 1939 to 1943 in agronomy at Laval University at the Sainte-Anne-de-la-Pocatière campus.

Fresh out of university, Ernest Mercier was immediately hired by the Government of Quebec which sent him to Cornell University, Ithaca, New York, United States to further his studies in the field of agronomy and artificial insemination. In 1946, Ernest Mercier earned a Ph.D. with post-graduate research on the influence of day length on reproduction efficiency and the shape of the lactation curve of dairy cows in Canadian latitudes.

== Career ==
=== Artificial Insemination Center of Quebec ===
The ministry of agriculture at the time was concerned with the poor productivity of dairy farms in the province and was blaming poor genetics as the root cause. Artificial insemination, then a novel technique, appeared to be promising solution so the government tasked the recently graduated Dr. Mercier with the founding of the Artificial Insemination Center of Quebec (CIAQ). The mission of the CIAQ was at the time the improvement of the yield of dairy cows, particularly through genetic amelioration but it would later expand in scope. The center conducted its first artificial insemination in 1948 and initiated the creation of a Dairy Herd Analysis Service. Dr. Mercier stayed with the center a total of three years, but through policies he enacted a decade later as the deputy-minister of agriculture, the center became semi-privatized and went on to become a leading institution in its domain.

=== Superintendent of the experimental farm at Lennoxville ===
In 1950, Dr. Mercier accepted a position with the federal government in Lennoxville, Quebec at the experimental station where he was in charge of the animal husbandry division. Following the retirement of the current superintendent, Dr. Mercier took up that role in 1952.

There, he worked on and directed numerous research and organizational projects such as the nutrition and winterizing of dairy and beef cattle, the breeding and selection of cattle, swine and sheep, the production of legume based animal feed, the reorganization of federal agronomical research institutions in Quebec and the vulgarization of agronomical research.

=== Deputy minister of agriculture ===
Dr. Mercier was appointed deputy minister of agriculture in 1960 under premier Jean Lesage's government, a position which he held until 1966. There, he worked to plan and implement provincial and federal agrifood policies required in transforming the family farm into a viable and profitable enterprise in Quebec. He enacted legislation that enabled farmers to regulate their own production in Quebec and Canada and made basic farm loans and credit available to all efficient family farm owners in Quebec. He created harvest insurance, thus giving farmers/business man incentives to invest in their exploitation by lowering risk. Drawing from his past experience working in research, he improved the transfer of scientific research knowledge to agrifood producers and the world of agriculture and had producers take responsibility for managing farm improvement services through semi-privatization, thereby making them stakeholders and decision makers in their businesses. In short, he guided the province toward a modern, scientific and industrialized agricultural system, which would decades later earn him the Order of Canada in 1989 and inductions to the Canadian Agricultural Hall of Fame in 1991 and the Agricultural Hall of Fame of Quebec in 1992.

=== Consultant ===
After retiring from public service, Dr. Mercier started doing assignments as a consultant. The list of organizations he worked with include the Canadian International Development Agency and the Food and Agriculture Organization. During those 12 years acting in this capacity, he worked on several international projects and took part in many Canadian delegations to developing countries such as Algeria, Cameroon, Morocco, Cuba, Haiti, Madagascar, Peru, Rwanda and Saudi Arabia. During this time, he also worked with Radio-Canada on agriculture related subjects both a researcher and interviewee and wrote numerous articles in specialized journals and periodicals.

== Retirement ==
Throughout his career and into retirement, Dr. Mercier was involved with his community and various organizations such as l'ordre des agronomes du Québec, the Agricultural Institute of Canada and the Canadian Hunger Foundation. Further into retirement, the focus of his efforts turned to genealogical work, writing books and articles on the subject and founding the Mercier Association of North America (French: Association des Mercier d'Amérique du Nord).

Following a sudden decline in health, Dr. Ernest Mercier died Monday the 4th of March 2002 at the St-Sacrement hospital in Quebec. He was survived by his wife and all his children.

== Publications ==
- Bratton, R.W.; Salisbury, G.W.; Tanabe, T.; Branton, C.; Mercier, E.; Loosli, J.K. (1948). "Breeding Behavior, Spermatogenesis, and Semen Production of Mature Dairy Bulls Fed Rations Low in Carotene". Journal of Dairy Science. 31 (9): 779–791. doi:10.3168/jds.S0022-0302(48)92258-9.
- Mercier, E.; Salisbury, G.W. (1947). "Seasonal Variations in Hours of Daylight Associated with Fertility Level of Cattle under Natural Breeding Conditions". Journal of Dairy Science. 30 (10): 747–756. doi:10.3168/jds.S0022-0302(47)92395-3.
- Mercier, E.; Salisbury, G.W. (1947). "Fertility Level in Artificial Breeding Associated with Season, Hours of Daylight, and the Age of Cattle". Journal of Dairy Science. 30 (11): 817–826. doi:10.3168/jds.S0022-0302(47)92405-3.
- VanDemark, N.L.; Mercier, E.; Salisbury, G.W. (1945). "The Methylene-Blue Reduction Test and its Relation to Other Measures of Quality in Bull Semen". Journal of Dairy Science. 28 (2): 121–128. doi:10.3168/jds.S0022-0302(45)95152-6.
- Salisbury, G.W.; Mercier, E. (1945). "The Relationship Between the Proportion of Morphologically Abnormal Spermatozoa and Other Criteria of Bull Semen Quality". Journal of Animal Science. 4: 174–178. doi:10.2527/jas1945.42174x.

== Bibliography ==
- Mercier, Ernest (1983). Notre-Dame-du-Rosaire, étape de l'amitié [Notre-Dame-du-Rosaire, a stage in friendship] (in French). Québec: Self-published. OCLC 15957585.
- Mercier, Ernest (1989). Mercier depuis des siècles [Mercier through the centuries] (in French). Québec: Walter Petrigo. ISBN 2-9801040-0-0.
