= Baldur R. Stefansson =

Canadian agronomist (1917–2002)

Baldur Rosmund Stefansson
- Born: April 26, 1917; Vestfold, Manitoba
- Died: January 3, 2002 (aged 84)
- Occupation: agronomist

Baldur Rosmund Stefansson, OC OM (April 26, 1917 – January 3, 2002) was a Canadian agricultural scientist and as one of the originators of canola, became known as the "Father of Canola".

Born in Vestfold, Manitoba, a son of Icelandic immigrants Guðmundur and Jonina Stefansson, he served in the Canadian army during World War II. After the war, he attended the University of Manitoba where he received a Dip.Ag. in 1949, a B.S.A. in 1950, and a M.Sc. in 1952. He received his Ph.D. in 1966.

He worked in the Department of Plant Science for the University of Manitoba as a professor and researcher. He worked with Dr. Keith Downey to develop a variety of rapeseed that could be used as an edible oil. This is known as canola and is one of Canada's top edible oil and one of the largest oilseed crops in the world. He retired in 1986.

In 1985 he was made an Officer of the Order of Canada. In 1998 he was awarded the Order of the Buffalo Hunt, one of Manitoba's highest honours. In 2000, he was presented with the Order of Manitoba and the Icelandic Order of the Falcon.

He received Honorary Doctorates from the University of Manitoba in 1997 and the University of Iceland in 2000. He was inducted to the Canadian Agricultural Hall of Fame in 2002.

He was married to Sigridur and they had three children: Bjorgvin, Helga and Paul.
