= Sahajanand Saraswati =

Peasant leader and Indian independence activist

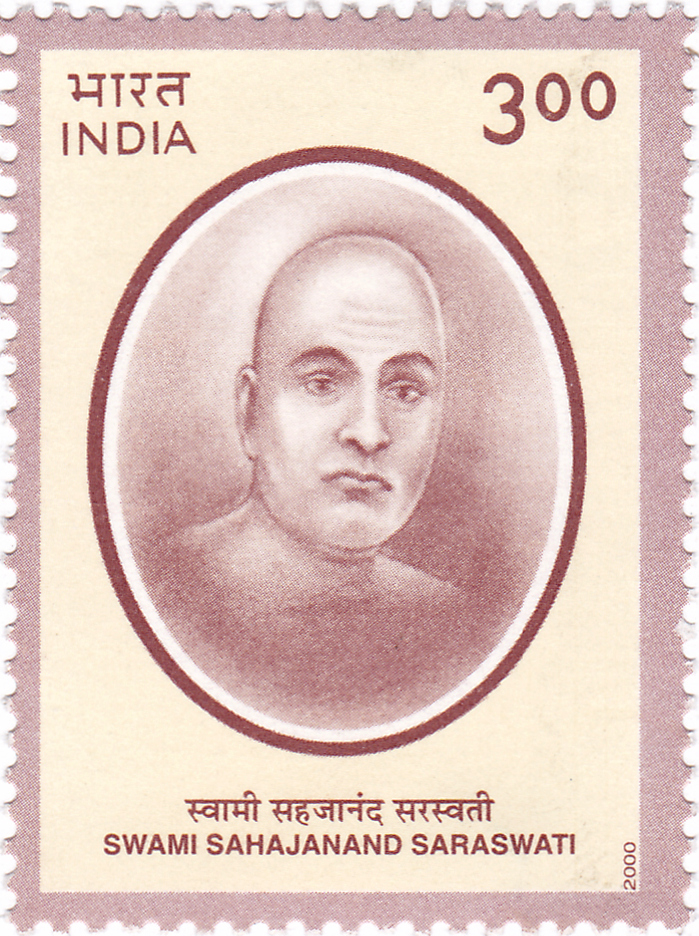
- Born: Naurang Rai; 22 February 1889; Deva, North-Western Provinces, British India
- Died: 26 June 1950 (aged 61); Muzaffarpur, Bihar, India
- Occupations: Social reformer, historian, philosopher, writer, ascetic, revolutionary, Farmer rights activist, politician

Sahajanand Saraswati (/sɛɦɛdʒa:nɐnd sɐrɐswɐti/, 22 February 1889 – 26 June 1950) was an ascetic, a nationalist and a peasant leader of India. Although born in United Provinces (present-day Uttar Pradesh), his social and political activities focused mostly on Bihar in the initial days, and gradually spread to the rest of India with the formation of the All India Kisan Sabha. He had set up an ashram at Bihta, near Patna, Bihar carried out most of his work in the later part of his life from there. He was an intellectual, prolific writer, social reformer and revolutionary.

== Biography ==
Swami Sahajanand Saraswati was born in Deva Village near Dullahpur, Ghazipur district in eastern Uttar Pradesh Provinces in 1889 to a Jijhotia Brahmin family, whose branch later became associated with the Bhumihar community in eastern Uttar Pradesh and Bihar family. He was the last of six sons and was then called Naurang Rai. His mother died in his childhood, and he was raised by his aunt.

The Kisan Sabha movement started in Bihar under the leadership of Saraswati, who formed the Bihar Provincial Kisan Sabha (BPKS) in 1929, to mobilise peasant grievances against the zamindari attacks on their occupancy rights, and thus sparking the farmers' movements in India.

Gradually the peasant movement intensified and spread across the rest of India. All these radical developments on the peasant front culminated in the formation of the All India Kisan Sabha (AIKS) at the Lucknow session of the Indian National Congress in April 1936 with Saraswati elected as its first President and it involved prominent leaders such as N. G. Ranga and E. M. S. Namboodiripad. The Kisan Manifesto, which was released in August 1936, demanded abolition of the zamindari system and cancellation of rural debts. In October 1937, the AIKS adopted the red flag as its banner. Soon, its leaders became increasingly distant with Congress, and repeatedly came in confrontation with Congress governments in Bihar and United Province.

Saraswati organised the Bakasht Movement in Bihar in 1937–1938. "Bakasht" means self-cultivated. The movement was against the eviction of tenants from Bakasht lands by zamindars and led to the passing of the Bihar Tenancy Act and the Bakasht Land Tax. He also led the successful struggle in the Dalmia Sugar Mill at Bihta, where peasant-worker unity was the most important characteristic.

On hearing of Saraswati's arrest during the Quit India Movement, Subhash Chandra Bose and All India Forward Bloc decided to observe 28 April as All-India Swami Sahajanand Day in protest of his incarceration by the British Raj.

Saraswati died on 26 June 1950.

Subhash Chandra Bose, leader of the Forward Bloc, said:

Swami Sahajanand Saraswati is, in the land of ours, a name to conjure with. The undisputed leader of the peasant movement in India, he is today the idol of the masses and the hero of millions. It was indeed a rare fortune to get him as the chairman of the Reception Committee of the All India Anti-Compromise Conference at Ramgarh. For the Forward Block it was a privilege and an honour to get him as one of the foremost leaders of the Left movement and as a friend, philosopher and guide of the Forward Block itself. Following Swamiji's lead, a large number of front-rank leaders of the peasant movement have been intimately associated with the Forward Block.

Three reformist leaders, namely, Swami Dayanand Saraswati, Swami Vivekananda, and Swami Sahajanand Saraswati, each in his own way, played a modernising role in our socio-cultural tradition. Both Dayananda and Vivekananda established their own socio-religious sects. But they had shied away from direct involvement with the political processes of the country, though they had become a major source of inspiration for Indian nationalism. On the other hand, Sahajanand did not found any religious sect. He engaged in social work for a while. Soon, he got directly involved in the national movement and even spent a number of years behind bars. Besides, he was not only instrumental in founding the organised peasant movement in India but also later assumed the role of its putative progenitor.

== Publications ==
Saraswati's publications include:

=== Books ===
1. Bhumihar Brahmin Parichay (Introduction to Bhumihar Brahmins), in Hindi.
2. Jhootha Bhay Mithya Abhiman (False Fear False Pride), in Hindi.
3. Brahman Kaun?
4. Brahman Samaj ki Sthiti (Situation of the Brahmin Society) in Hindi.
5. Brahmarshi Vansha Vistar in Sanskrit, Hindi and English.
6. Karmakalap, in Sanskrit and Hindi.

=== Autobiographical works ===
1. Mera Jeewan Sangharsha (My Life Struggle), in Hindi.
2. Kisan Sabha ke Sansmaran (Recollections of the Kisan Sabha), in Hindi.
3. Maharudra ka Mahatandav, in Hindi.
4. Jang aur Rashtriya Azadi
5. Ab Kya ho?
6. Gaya jile mein sava maas
7. Samyukta Kisan Sabha, Samyukta Samajvadi Sabha ke Dastavez.
8. Kisanon ke Dave
9. Dhakaich ka bhashan

=== Ideological works ===
1. Kranti aur Samyukta Morcha
2. Gita Hridaya (Heart of the Gita)
3. Kisanon ke Dave
4. Maharudra ka Mahatandav
5. Kalyan mein chapein lekh

=== Works related to peasantry and Zamindars ===
1. Kisan kaise ladten hain?
2. Kisan kya karen?
3. Zamindaron ka khatma kaise ho?
4. Kisan ke dost aur dushman
5. Bihar prantiya kisansabha ka ghoshna patra
6. Kisanon ki phasane ki taiyariyan
7. On the other side
8. Rent reduction in Bihar, How it Works?
9. Zamindari kyon utha di jaye?
10. Khet Mazdoor (Agricultural Labourer), in Hindi, written in Hazaribagh Central Jail.
11. Jharkhand ke kisan
12. Bhumi vyavastha kaisi ho?
13. Kisan andolan kyun aur kya?
14. Gaya ke Kisanon ki Karun Kahani
15. Ab kya ho?
16. Congress tab aur ab
17. Congress ne kisanon ke liye kya kiya?
18. Maharudra ka Mahatandav
19. Swamiji ki Diary
20. Kisan sabha ke dastavez
21. Swamiji ke patrachar
22. Lok sangraha mein chapen lekh
23. Hunkar mein chapein lekh
24. Vishal Bharat mein chapein lekh
25. Bagi mein chapein lekh
26. Bhumihar Brahmin mein chapein lekh
27. Swamiji ki Bhashan Mala
28. Krishak mein chapein lekh
29. Yogi mein chapein lekh
30. Kisan sevak
31. Anya lekh
32. Address of the chairman, Reception Committee, The All India Anti-Compromise Conference, First Session, Kisan Nagar, Ramgarh, Hazaribagh, 19 & 20 March 1940, Ramgarh, 1940.
33. Presidential Address, 8th Annual Session of the Kisan Sabha, Bezwada, 1944.

== Translations into English ==
- Swami Sahajanand and the Peasants of Jharkhand: A View from 1941 translated and edited by Walter Hauser along with the unedited Hindi original (Manohar Publishers, paperback, 2005).
- Sahajanand on Agricultural Labour and the Rural Poor translated and edited by Walter Hauser Manohar Publishers, paperback, 2005.
- Religion, Politics, and the Peasants: A Memoir of India's Freedom Movement translated and edited by Walter Hauser Manohar Publishers, hardbound, 2003.
- Walter Hauser, along with K.C. Jha, (editor and translator of Swami Sahajanand's autobiography Mera Jivan Sangharsh – My Life Struggle) Culture, Vernacular Politics and the Peasants: India, 1889–1950, Delhi, Manohar, 2015.
- Ramchandra Pradhan (editor and translator), The Struggle of My Life: Autobiography of Swami Sahajanand Saraswati, Delhi, Oxford University Press, 2018.
- Pratyush Kumar, Homo Connubialis Brahmanicus: Marriage Relations Among Brahmins, Baden-Baden: Nomos (Ergon), Germany, 2025, ISBN 978-3-98740-189-3 (Print).
- Ramchandra Pradhan (editor and translator), Reminiscences and Struggles of the Kisan Sabha (Selected Works of Swami Sahajanand Saraswati Vol. I), New Delhi: Primus Books, 2025.
- Ramchandra Pradhan (editor and translator), What Should Peasants Do? (Selected Works of Swami Sahajanand Saraswati Vol. II), New Delhi: Primus Books, 2025.
- Ramchandra Pradhan (editor and translator), Major Addresses of Swami Sahajanand Saraswati (Selected Works of Swami Sahajanand Saraswati Vol. III), New Delhi: Primus Books, 2025.
- Ramchandra Pradhan (editor and translator), Major Essays and Other Writings (Selected Works of Swami Sahajanand Saraswati Vol. IV), New Delhi: Primus Books, 2025.

== Biographies ==
- Nilanshu Ranjan, Swami Sahajanand Saraswati, National Book Trust, New Delhi, ISBN 978-81-237-6486-3.
- Raghav Sharan Sharma, Swami Sahajanand Saraswati, Publications Division, Government of India, 2008.

== Official recognition ==
The Government of India issued a commemorative stamp in commemoration of Saraswati on 26 June 2000 by Ram Vilas Paswan, the then Minister of Communications.

The Indian Council of Agricultural Research gives the Swamy Sahajanand Saraswati Extension Scientist/ Worker Award.

In 2001, a two-day Kisan Mahapanchayat was organised on the occasion of the 112th birth anniversary of Saraswati.

Bihar Governor R. S. Gavai released a book on the life of Saraswati on his 57th death anniversary in Patna.

Swami Sahajanand Postgraduate College is established in his home district Ghazipur (U.P.) in memory of Swami Sahajanand.

== See also ==
- Mata Badal Koeri
- Debt bondage in India
- All India United Kisan Sabha
