= National Agriculture Awards =

National Agriculture Award জাতীয় কৃষি পুরস্কার
- Awarded for: Substantial contribution in the field of research in agricultural development.
- Location: Dhaka, Bangladesh
- Country: Bangladesh
- Presented by: Government of Bangladesh
- Formerly called: President's Award for Agricultural Development
- First award: 1973

The National Agriculture Award is a Bangladeshi award given to recognise a substantial contribution in the field of research in agricultural development. The medal is categorised into gold, silver and bronze medals.

This award was started in 1973 under the Ministry of Agriculture of Bangladesh. The award was stopped in 1975 and restarted in 2009. After the fall of the Awami League government in 2024, the award in Bangabandhu's name was declared null and void.

== See also ==
- List of agriculture awards
