= Keith Downey (agricultural scientist) =

Canadian agricultural scientist

Richard Keith Downey OC SOM FRSC
- Born: January 26, 1927 (age 99); Saskatoon, Saskatchewan
- Occupation: agricultural scientist

Richard Keith Downey, OC SOM FRSC (born January 26, 1927) is a Canadian agricultural scientist known for plant breeding and, as one of the originators of canola. He conducted his research at Agriculture and Agri-Food Canada (AAFC) and is largely responsible for transforming rapeseed into canola. His pioneering research has made him known as the "Father of Canola".

== Education ==
Born in Saskatoon, Saskatchewan, In 1951 he received a B.S.A. and in 1952 an M.Sc. from the University of Saskatchewan. He received his Ph.D. from Cornell University in 1961 and also received an honorary Doctor of Science degree from the University of Saskatchewan in 1994.

== Career ==
In 1951 Downey started working for Agriculture Canada initially as an alfalfa breeder in Lethbridge, becoming in 1993 a Senior Research Scientist Emeritus. In 1993, he started his own firm and is president of Canoglobe Consulting Inc. He also worked as an adjunct professor in the University of Saskatchewan College of Agriculture and Bioresources.

Downey worked with Baldur Stefansson to develop a variety of rapeseed with low ratios of potentially harmful erucic acid and glucosinolates that could be used as an edible oil. This is known as canola and is one of Canada’s top edible oils and one of the largest oilseed crops in the world. At the time of Downey's work to develop canola, Canada was importing 95 per cent of its edible oils, so his research was an effort to save Canada's failing rapeseed industry, which had declined from 80,000 acres in 1948 to a 400 acres by 1950.

Canola crop was first grown during World War II on the prairies to make industrial oil for the war effort, used as a lubricant on steam-powered ships and trains. It now rivals wheat as the leading moneymaker for Saskatchewan farmers. Canola now covers 20 million acres in Canada and contributes billions of dollars to the economy.

Downey is the breeder and co-breeder of 13 rapeseed/canola varieties, five condiment mustard varieties, and one alfalfa variety. He has been breeding Brassica oilseed and mustard crops for more than 50 years. His oilseed improvement expertise has been shared around the world with missions to Pakistan, India, Ethiopia, Chile, Argentina, Poland, Egypt, and Australia.

Downey retired in 1993, but continued as a research scientist emeritus at AAFC and an adjunct professor at the University of Saskatchewan. In 1998, "Downey Street" at a research and development park in Saskatoon was named in his honour.

In the late 1990s, after his retirement, Downey led a project for Canadian school children that tested the effects of space travel on canola seeds. The seeds had spent 17 days in orbit aboard the Columbia space shuttle, then were subsequently planted in classrooms across the country. A highly significant increase in germination rate was observed when compared to canola seeds that were left on earth. Researchers are still working to understand the results.

== Honours ==
- 1963 Bond Gold Medal, American Oil Chemists’ Society
- 1968 Public Service Merit Award, Government of Canada
- 1971 Honorary Life Membership Canadian Seed Growers’ Association
- 1973 Grindley Medal, Agriculture Institute of Canada
- 1975 Honorary Life Membership Saskatchewan Rapeseed Growers’ Association
- 1975 Royal Bank Award, Royal Bank
- 1976 Officer, Order of Canada
- 1976 Fellow, Agriculture Institute of Canada
- 1977 Queen Elizabeth II Silver Jubilee Medal
- 1979 Fellow Royal Society of Canada
- 1982 Century Saskatoon Award, City of Saskatoon
- 1986 Distinguished Graduate Award, University of Saskatchewan, College of Agriculture
- 1990 Gold Medal, co-recipient, Professional Institute of Canada
- 1992 125th Anniversary of the Confederation of Canada Medal
- 1994 Honorary Doctor of Science, University of Saskatchewan
- 1994 Clark-Newman Award, Canadian Seed Growers Association
- 1995 J. Mcansh Award, Canola Council of Canada
- 1995 Eminent Scientist Award / Groupe Consultatif International de Recherche sur le Colza
- 1995 Médaille Chevreul / Association Francaise pour l’Etude des Corps Gras, France
- 1996 Hall of Fame, Saskatchewan Agriculture Hall of Fame
- 1997 Honorary Doctorate of Law University of Lethbridge
- 1997 Recognition Award, Canadian Seed Trade Association
- 2000 Honorary Life Membership Saskatchewan Agriculture Graduates Association
- 2002 Canadian Agricultural Hall of Fame
- 2002 Queen Elizabeth II Golden Jubilee Medal
- 2016 Saskatchewan Order of Merit
- 2017 Canola Influencer Award, SaskCanola
