= The Cooperative de Mai =

The Coopérative de Mai (also called La Coopé) is a significant musical venue of Clermont-Ferrand, France. It was inaugurated on March 7, 2000 with a performance by Rita Mitsouko.

== History ==
Didier Veillault, former director of the Plan in Ris-Orangis and coopérative’s current director was recruited in early 1999 as the head of project. In early 2000 the Pop Art Association was chosen to manage it. The building housing the Cooperative de Mai and the Polydome convention center was built land that was previously occupied by the Michelin cooperative, a department store.

== Equipment ==
The Cooperative de Mai is made up of two show rooms:

- The Club (the “Petite Coopé”) which can accommodate 464 people including fifty who can access a mezzanine. The scenic area Club is 35 m^{2}.
- The Great Hall, which has a capacity of 1500 seats. The stage area is 210 m^{2}.

== Programming ==
The hall is the site of about 130 concerts a year. More than 1,800 artists have performed there including Elliott Smith, The National, Patti Smith, Marianne Faithfull, Morrissey, Belle and Sebastian, Tindersticks, Dream Theater, The Hives, Divine Comedy, Thirty Seconds to Mars, The White Stripes, Noir Désir, and Muse.
