= India's Agriculture Development Problem: Lack of Access to Credit =

In India's Agriculture Problem: Lack of Access to Credit is one of the most pressing issues that hinder India’s rural population from progress. It means the lack of access to credit by a farmer. Farmer’s suicide within the agricultural sector does not occur as a shocking matter as the farmers are deprived of monetary assistance when they are most in need.

A farmer's cries for help have been ignored as the damaging effects from the absence of credit loans tickles down the population. Apart from the healthcare of a farmer, the lack of access to credit also highly important as almost 80% the farmers own less than a hectare of land. The availability of credit allows farmers to be protected from the inflated costs faced in agriculture and also, improve the quality of fertilizers and hence the output. Should the distribution of credit loans improve, the Indian government would also find it easy to meet production targets and have a better control over prices of grains. Due to the critical shortage of agricultural output, India has to resort to banning grain exports and instead, drive up its import bills from wheat coming into the country. There has been so much attention focused on the industrial and services sector that the agricultural side has been largely neglected. The lack of credit loans coupled with improper government intervention had resulted in the livelihood of the farmers to go downhill.

As commercial banks are not present in remote locations of India, where agriculture is supposed to thrive, it becomes an important limitation as the rural population has a strong dependence on it. Co-operative banks which have been set up previously were also doomed to fail as a result of bad loans and a lack of funds. These commercial banks have their own set of worries, as defaults and crop failures are common in the sector. As such, they prefer lending out to areas where each farmer owns a much larger proportion of land and also, have better irrigation systems.

However, that does not solve the problem as the smaller farmers’ (which forms a majority) issues remains unaddressed. There should be better banking systems established that is accessible and affordable to every person. The benefits of economic growth have not been equally shared among all as the access to credit is not granted to all. Economic opportunities ought to be created for the marginalized groups to help in poverty reduction and inequality problems. Further attempts made by the government to expand credit loans have resulted in more cases of poverty than ever. The lack of access to formal credit thus places many constraints on agricultural output and also, the standards of living for the rural population thereby hindering their path to further economic and social development.

== See also ==
- Debt bondage in India
