= List of minor insects of Sri Lanka =

Sri Lanka is a tropical island situated close to the southern tip of India. The invertebrate fauna is as large as it is common to other regions of the world. There are about 2 million and counting species of arthropods found in the world. Due to this, it is very difficult to summarize the exact number of species found within a certain region.

The following list is about some minor insect orders recorded in Sri Lanka.

== Jumping bristletails ==
Phylum: Arthropoda
Class: Insecta
Order: Archaeognatha

Archaeognatha, are an insect order of the subclass Apterygota, which means they are insects without wings at any stage of the lifecycle. In the evolution of insects, Archaeognatha are the most primitive insects currently exists in the world. They have elongated bodies and arched backs. They have three long caudal filaments, where two lateral filaments are known as cerci, and the medial one is an epiproct. 350 species of Jumping bristletails belong to two families have been identified. Two species are known from Sri Lanka.

=== Family: Machilidae ===
- Graphitarsus phillipsi
- Graphitarsus schmidi

== Silverfish ==
Phylum: Arthropoda
Class: Insecta
Order: Zygentoma

Zygentoma is an insect order of the subclass Apterygota. The order includes silverfish, fishmoths, and the firebrats. All Zygentoma species have three long caudal filaments, where two lateral filaments are known as cerci, and the medial one is an epiproct or appendix dorsalis. There are five families in the order. 3 species are known from Sri Lanka.

=== Family: Ateluridae ===
- Assmuthia escherichii

=== Family: Lepismatidae ===
- Ctenolepisma calva
- Namunukulina funambuli

== Webspinners ==
Phylum: Arthropoda
Class: Insecta
Order: Embioptera

The order Embioptera, commonly known as webspinners, are a small group of mostly tropical and subtropical insects, classified under the subclass Pterygota. The order has also been referred to as Embiodea or Embiidina. The name Embioptera ("lively wings") comes from Greek, εμβιος, embios meaning "lively" and πτερον, pteron meaning "wing", a name that has not been considered to be particularly descriptive for this group of fliers, perhaps instead referring to their remarkable speed of movement both forward and backward.

Over 360 embiopteran species have been described, along with estimates of around 2000 species being in existence today. There is some debate as to the exact phylogenetic classification of Embioptera, with the order having been classed as a sister group to both orders Zoraptera, and Phasmatodea,

The following list provide the lacewings currently identified in Sri Lanka. Only four species found from this order within the country.

Endemic species are denoted as E.

=== Family: Oligotomidae ===
- Aposthonia ceylonica
- Aposthonia minuscula
- Oligotoma humbertiana
- Oligotoma saundersii

== Booklice ==
Phylum: Arthropoda
Class: Insecta
Order: Psocoptera

Psocoptera are an order of insects that are commonly known as booklice, barklice or barkflies. They first appeared in the Permian period, 295–248 million years ago. They are often regarded as the most primitive of the hemipteroids. Their name originates from the Greek word ψῶχος, psokos meaning gnawed or rubbed and πτερά, ptera meaning wings. There are more than 5,500 species in 41 families in three suborders. Many of these species have only been described in recent years.

The Order Psocoptera is divided into three suborders. According to checklists by Smithers in 1967 and New in 1977, there are 67 accepted species of booklice found from Sri Lanka. The checklist of New was advanced with the full description of two subfamilies Epipsocidae and Pseudocaeciliidae, from Sri Lanka.

=== Family: Amphientomidae - tropical barklice ===
- Paramphientomum nietneri
- Seopsis metallops
- Seopsis superba
- Seopsis vasantasena
- Syllysis caudata
- Syllysis erato
- Syllysis ritusamhara
- Tineomorpha greeniana

=== Family: Amphipsocidae - hairy-winged barklice ===
- Taeniostigma elongatum

=== Family: Archipsocidae - ancient barklice ===
- Archipsocopsis biguttata
- Archipsocopsis fernandi

=== Family: Caeciliusidae - lizard barklice ===
- Caecilius sp.
- Coryphosmila dolabrata
- Dypsocus coleoptratus
- Enderleinella ceylonica
- Isophanes palliatus
- Valenzuela aridus
- Valenzuela maculistigma

=== Family: Calopsocidae - common barklice ===
- Calopsocus infelix

=== Family: Ectopsocidae - outer barklice ===
- Ectopsocus aethiops
- Ectopsocus piger

=== Family: Elipsocidae - damp barklice ===
- Elipsocus boops
- Elipsocus impressus
- Nepiomorpha crucifera

=== Family: Epipsocidae - elliptical barklice ===
- Epipsocopsis delicata
- Epipsocopsis greeni
- Epipsocopsis hakgalensis
- Epipsocopsis peradenayensis
- Epipsocopsis taprobanensis

=== Family: Hemipsocidae - leaf litter barklice ===
- Hemipsocus chloroticus
- Hemipsocus roseus

=== Family: Lepidopsocidae - scaly-winged barklice ===
- Echmepteryx mihira
- Echmepteryx sericea
- Lepium chrysochlorum
- Lepium luridum
- Lepolepis ceylonica
- Nepticulomima chalcomelas
- Nepticulomima essigkeana
- Nepticulomima jacobsoni
- Nepticulomima sakuntala
- Perientomum acutipenne
- Perientomum argentatum
- Perientomum ceylonicum
- Perientomum chrysargyrium
- Perientomum greeni
- Perientomum gregarium
- Perientomum morosum
- Perientomum trichopteryx
- Perientomum triste
- Proentomum personatum
- Soa flaviterminata
- Scolopama halterata
- Lepolepis ceylonica

=== Family: Liposcelididae - booklice ===
- Embidopsocus minor
- Embidopsocus oleaginus

=== Family: Myopsocidae - mouse-like barklice ===
- Myopsocus unduosus

=== Family: Peripsocidae - stout barklice ===
- Peripsocus milloti
- Peripsocus pauliani

=== Family: Philotarsidae - loving barklice ===
- Aaroniella maligawa
- Haplophallus orientalis

=== Family: Pseudocaeciliidae - false lizard barklice ===
- Allopsocus medialis
- Heterocaecilius ornatus
- Mesocaecilius pictipennis
- Ophiodopelma hieroglyphicum
- Ophiodopelma multipunctatum
- Pseudocaecilius cribrarius
- Pseudocaecilius lanatus
- Pseudocaecilius molestus
- Pseudocaecilius ornatus
- Pseudocaecilius paraornatus
- Pseudocaecilius zonatus

=== Family: Psocidae - common barklice ===
- Atrichadenotecnum quinquepunctatum
- Blaste obtusa
- Copostigma trimaculatum
- Psocidus consitus
- Psocidus oblitus
- Psococerastis taprobanes
- Trichadenotecnum circulare

=== Family: Stenopsocidae - narrow barklice ===
- Stenopsocus apertus
- Stenopsocus uniformis

== Thrips ==
Phylum: Arthropoda
Class: Insecta
Order: Thysanoptera

Thrips (order Thysanoptera) are minute, slender insects with fringed wings (thus the scientific name. Other common names for thrips include thunderflies, thunderbugs, storm flies, thunderblights, storm bugs, corn flies and corn lice. Thrips species feed on a large variety of plants and animals by puncturing them and sucking up the contents. A large number of thrips species are considered pests, because they feed on plants with commercial value. Some species of thrips feed on other insects or mites and are considered beneficial, while some feed on fungal spores or pollen. Approximately 6,000 species have been described. Thrips are generally tiny (1 mm long or less) and are not good flyers, although they can be carried long distances by the wind. In the right conditions, like indoor grow rooms or greenhouses, many species can exponentially increase in population size and form large swarms because of a lack of natural predators, making them an irritation to humans.

The first comprehensive detailed work on Sri Lankan thrip fauna came through Schmutz in 1913. His checklist stood for more than 70 years with 43 new species. In 1997, Oda et al. rediscovered and updated the thrip diversity, but with small collections from Sri Lanka. The most recent work was done by Wijerathna, and he listed 16 species of thrips from 28 crops across the island. Currently, thrips documented within Sri Lanka included to 3 families - Aeolothripidae, Thripidae, and Phlaeothripidae, with 46 genera and 78 species.

=== Family: Aeolothripidae - predatory thrips ===
- Franklinothrips vespiformis

=== Family: Thripidae - common thrips ===
- Anaphothrips sudanensis
- Bolacothrips striatopennatus
- Bregmatothrips brachycephalus
- Caliothrips graminicola
- Caliothrips indicus
- Copidothrips octarticulatus
- Dendrothrips sexmaculatus
- Helionothrips brunneipennis
- Heliothrips haemorrhoidalis
- Noathrips prakashi
- Panchaetothrips indicus
- Parthenothrips dracaenae
- Phibalothrips peringueyi
- Retithrips syriacus
- Rhipiphorothrips cruentatus
- Rhipiphorothrips pulchellus
- Selenothrips rubrocinctus
- Tryphactothrips rutherfordi
- Pseudodendrothrips ornatissimus
- Chaetanaphothrips signipennis
- Deuterobrachythrips lineatus
- Frankliniella occidentalis
- Frankliniella schultzei
- Megalurothrips distalis
- Megalurothrips typicus
- Megalurothrips usitatus
- Microcephalothrips abdominalis
- Neohydatothrips samayunkur
- Sciothrips cardamomi
- Scirtothrips dorsalis
- Stenchaetothrips biformis
- Thrips coloratus
- Thrips flavus
- Thrips jlorum
- Thrips hawaiiensis
- Thrips longalatus
- Thrips palmi
- Thrips simplex
- Thrips tabaci

=== Family: Phlaeothripidae - tube-tailed thrips ===
- Aleurodothrips fasciapennis
- Androthrips flavipes
- Bactrothrips idolomorphus
- Chromatothrips annulicornis
- Chromatothrips fasciatus
- Chromatothrips plantaginis
- Diaphorothrips unguipes
- Dinothrips spinosus
- Dinothrips sumatrensi
- Ecacanthothrips tibialis
- Elaphrothrips denticollis
- Elaphrothrips greeni
- Elaphrothrips malayensis
- Elaphrothrips procer
- Ethirothrips angusticornis
- Ethirothrips indicus
- Ethirothrips obscurus
- Ethirothrips stenomelas
- Ethirothrips watsoni
- Eumorphothrips albicornis
- Gigantothrips schenklingi
- Gigantothrips tibialis
- Haplothrips ceylonicus
- Haplothrips ganglbaueri
- Haplothrips gowdeyi
- Haplothrips terminalis
- Liothrips floridensis
- Liothrips karnyi
- Liothrips mirabilis
- Liothrips tropicus
- Liothrips vaneeckei
- Ischyrothrips crassus
- Mecynothrips simplex
- Neosomerinthothrips affinis
- Neosomerinthothrips fructuum
- Teuchothrips brevis
- Teuchothrips longus
- Trichinothrips breviceps

== Fleas ==
Phylum: Arthropoda
Class: Insecta
Order: Siphonaptera

Fleas are insects that form the order Siphonaptera. They are wingless, with mouthparts adapted for piercing skin and sucking blood. Fleas are external parasites, living by hematophagy off the blood of mammals and birds. Over 2,000 species have been described worldwide.

The following list provide the fleas found in Sri Lanka. The first checklist of fleas in Sri Lanka was done by Iyengar in 1973. 20 species are recognized, more taxonomic study is required. The fleas studies were almost confined to parasitic sections, where W. W. A. Phillips documented 11 species of fleas in 1980.

=== Family: Ceratophyllidae ===
- Macrostylophora phillipsi
- Nosopsyllus ceylonensis
- Nosopsyllus tamilanus

=== Family: Ischnopsyllidae - bat fleas ===
- Araeopsylla gestroi
- Ischnopsyllus indicus
- Thaumapsylla breviceps - ssp. orientalis

=== Family: Pulicidae - cat fleas ===
- Ctenocephalides canis
- Ctenocephalides felis
- Pulex irritans
- Xenopsylla cheopis

=== Family: Stivaliidae ===
- Lentistivalius ferinus
- Stivalius aporus
- Stivalius phoberus

== Caddisflies ==
Phylum: Arthropoda
Class: Insecta
Order: Trichoptera

The caddisflies are an order, Trichoptera, of insects with approximately 7,000 described species. Also called sedge-flies or rail-flies, they are small moth-like insects having two pairs of hairy membranous wings. They are closely related to Lepidoptera (moths and butterflies) which have scales on their wings, and the two orders together form the superorder Amphiesmenoptera. Caddisflies have aquatic larvae and are found in a wide variety of habitats such as streams, rivers, lakes, ponds, spring seeps, and temporary waters (vernal pools). The larvae of many species use silk to make protective cases of gravel, sand, twigs or other debris.

The caddisfly diversity in Sri Lanka is fairly studied from British times to present day. However, the first comprehensive work was done by Schmid in 1958. Then in 1973, Malicky updated the checklist. Currently 188 number of caddisfly species belongs to 18 families are identified from Sri Lanka.

=== Family: Anomalopsychidae ===
- Ceylanopsyche asaka
- Ceylanopsyche kabaragola
- Ceylanopsyche kaltenbachi

=== Family: Calamoceratidae ===
- Anisocentropus ittikulama
- Ganonema falcatus

=== Family: Dipseudopsidae ===
- Dipseudopsis notata

=== Family: Ecnomidae ===
- Ecnomus ceylanicus
- Ecnomus chusie
- Ecnomus dutthangamani
- Ecnomus helakanda
- Ecnomus hinayana
- Ecnomus indicus
- Ecnomus lohaprasada
- Ecnomus saddhatissa
- Ecnomus tenellus
- Ecnomus vaharika
- Ecnomus vahasaba

=== Family: Goeridae ===
- Goera katugalkanda
- Goera katugastota
- Goera kirilagoda
- Goera paragoda

=== Family: Glossosomatidae - little black caddisflies ===
- Agapetus anuragoda
- Agapetus ayodhia
- Agapetus hanumata
- Agapetus kithmalie
- Agapetus kumudumalie
- Agapetus rama
- Agapetus rawana
- Agapetus rudis
- Agapetus sita

=== Family: Helicopsychidae - snail-case caddisflies ===
- Helicopsyche amarawathi
- Helicopsyche arayar
- Helicopsyche euchloe
- Helicopsyche gudrunae
- Helicopsyche petri
- Helicopsyche ruprawathi
- Helicopsyche salika
- Helicopsyche srilanka

=== Family: Hydrobiosidae ===
- Hydropsyche flynni
- Hydropsyche fryeri
- Hydropsyche katugahakanda
- Hydropsyche malassanka

=== Family: Hydropsychidae - net-spinning caddisflies ===
- Amphipsyche meridiana
- Amphipsyche sinhala
- Cheumatopsyche curvata
- Cheumatopsyche galahittigama
- Cheumatopsyche galapitikanda
- Cheumatopsyche kirimaduwa
- Macrostactobia elawalikanda
- Macrostemum indistinctum
- Macrostemum kolenati
- Macrostemum multifarium
- Macrostemum nebulosum
- Macrostemum pseudoneura
- Macrostemum splendidum
- Molanna taprobane
- Oestropsyche vitrina
- Potamyia nikalandugola
- Pseudoleptonema godapitigama
- Pseudoleptonema kalukandama

=== Family: Hydroptilidae - micro caddisflies ===
- Chrysotrichia aranuwa
- Chrysotrichia dotalugola
- Chrysotrichia hapitigola
- Chrysotrichia hatnagola
- Chrysotrichia porsawan
- Chrysotrichia siriya
- Hydroptila dikirilagoda
- Hydroptila furcata
- Hydroptila hemeli
- Hydroptila kirilawela
- Hydroptila kurukepitiya
- Hydroptila mitirigalla
- Hydroptila sumanmalie
- Hydroptila upulmalie
- Nietnerella hageni
- Nyctiophylax abaya
- Nyctiophylax devanampriya
- Nyctiophylax hettigegama
- Nyctiophylax tallawakanda
- Nyctiophylax vetulya
- Orthotrichia guruluhela
- Orthotrichia hinipitigola
- Orthotrichia indica
- Orthotrichia litoralis
- Orthotrichia udawarama
- Oxyethira bogambara
- Oxyethira galekoluma
- Oxyethira incana
- Oxyethira rachanee
- Paduniella ceylanica
- Paduniella mahanawana
- Paduniella mahindra
- Paduniella methinee
- Paduniella pandya
- Paduniella sanghamittra
- Paduniella siveci
- Paduniella subhakara
- Paduniella thitima
- Paduniella vattagamani
- Paduniella vikramasinha
- Parastactobia talakalahena
- Plethus amogawarsa
- Plethus bodikatuwa
- Plethus cilamegha
- Plethus cursitans
- Plethus udawasadenna
- Plethus vajrabodhi
- Rhyacophila castanea
- Stactobia fischeri

=== Family: Lepidostomatidae - bizarre caddisflies ===
- Goerodes kanda
- Goerodes ursinus

=== Family: Leptoceridae - long-horned caddisflies ===
- Adicella agastya
- Adicella biramosa
- Ceraclea isurumuniya
- Gunungiella madakumbura
- Gunungiella nimitra
- Leptocerus anuradha
- Leptocerus argentoniger
- Leptocerus charopantaja
- Leptocerus mahasena
- Leptocerus mahawansa
- Leptocerus parakum
- Leptocerus posticus
- Oecetis belihuloya
- Oecetis biramosa
- Oecetis ceylanica
- Oecetis dhatusena
- Oecetis fahieni
- Oecetis hamata
- Oecetis jacobsoni
- Oecetis lingua
- Oecetis malighawa
- Oecetis meghadouta
- Oecetis naravitta
- Oecetis nerviciliata
- Oecetis punctatissima
- Oecetis sumanasara
- Parasetodes respersellus
- Setodes argentoaureus
- Tagalopsyche brunnea
- Triaenodes lankarama
- Triaenodes ornatus
- leiochiton suwannee
- Trichosetodes argentolineatus
- Trichosetodes meghawanabaya
- Triplectides ceylanicus

=== Family: Limnephilidae - northern caddisflies ===
- Diplectrona kirimaduhela
- Diplectrona papilionacea
- Diplectronella taprobanes

=== Family: Odontoceridae - mortarjoint casemakers ===
- Marilia mixta

=== Family: Philopotamidae - fingernet caddisflies ===
- Chimarra actinifera
- Chimarra akarawitta
- Chimarra auriceps
- Chimarra auricoma
- Chimarra ceylanica
- Chimarra circularis
- Chimarra confusa
- Chimarra godagama
- Chimarra jiraprapa
- Chimarra lankana
- Chimarra lewisi
- Chimarra mitis
- Chimarra prisna
- Chimarra sandhamma
- Chimarra sepulchralis
- Chimarra telihigola
- Chimarra uvana
- Chimarra wiharawela

=== Family: Polycentropodidae - tube-maker caddisflies ===
- Pahamunaya layagammeda
- Polyplectropus amarawathi
- Polyplectropus matadapaya
- Polyplectropus nubigenus
- Polyplectropus parakrama
- Pseudoneureclipsis hataya
- Pseudoneureclipsis maliboda
- Pseudoneureclipsis narita
- Pseudoneureclipsis nissanka
- Pseudoneureclipsis thuparama
- Pseudoneureclipsis watagoda
- Pseudoneureclipsis wilaiwan
- Pseudoneureclipsis yuwadee

=== Family: Psychomyiidae - net-tube caddisflies ===
- Lype tipmanee

=== Family: Xiphocentronidae ===
- Abaria margaritifera

== Twisted-winged parasites ==
Phylum: Arthropoda
Class: Insecta
Order: Strepsiptera

Order Strepsiptera, commonly called, twisted-wing parasites, are an endopterygote order of insects. The order consists with nine extant families with about 600 species. Adults in most of their lives are spent as endoparasites in other insects, such as bees, wasps, leafhoppers, silverfish, and cockroaches. Males have well-developed pair of hind-wings and reduced fore-wings. Females wingless and usually do not leave their hosts.

The first scientific observation and detailed work on strepsipterans of Sri Lanka was done by Kathirithamby in 1994. In 1997, Kifune discovered 20 strepsipterans from Sri Lanka, with 7 new species. All these new species genera are endemic to the country.

=== Family: Corioxenidae ===
- Triozocera ceylonensis

=== Family: Elenchidae ===
- Elenchus tenuicornis

=== Family: Halictophagidae ===
- Halictophagus minimus
- Halictophagus peradenyia
- Halictophagus sodeni
- Halictophagus spectrus
- Tridactylophagus ceylonensis

=== Family: Mengenillidae ===
- Mengenilla orientalis

=== Family: Myrmecolacidae ===
- Myrmecolax nietneri
- Stichotrema ambiguum
- Stichotrema acutipennis
- Stichotrema ceylonense
- Stichotrema dallatorreanum
- Stichotrema krombeini
- Stichotrema minor
- Stichotrema simile

=== Family: Stylopidae ===
- Paraxenos australiensis
- Paraxenos krombeini
- Paraxenos occidentalis

== Lice ==
Phylum: Arthropoda
Class: Insecta
Order: Phthiraptera

Phthiraptera, is an insect order, which comprise more than 5,000 species of wingless insects. All lice are obligate parasites which live externally on warm-blooded mammals and birds. The three cosmopolitan species of lice live within the humans, on head, body and pubic region. They are divided into two groups, sucking lice and chewing lice. The exact number of lice in Sri Lanka is not known. Only some species have been documented.

=== Family: Haematomyzidae ===
- Haematomyzus elephantis

=== Family: Hoplopleuridae ===
- Hoplopleura maniculata

=== Family: Menoponidae ===
- Myrsidea clayae

=== Family: Pediculidae ===
- Pediculus humanus
  - Pediculus humanus capitis
  - Pediculus humanus humanus

=== Family: Pthiridae ===
- Pthirus pubis

== Scorpionflies ==
Phylum: Arthropoda
Class: Insecta
Order: Mecoptera

Mecoptera is an insect order with about 600 described species. They are commonly known as scorpionflies, due to enlarged genitals possessed by males, which resemble the stinger of a scorpion. They are one of major pollinators gymnosperms along with bees. Detailed work on mecopterans in Sri Lanka not yet carried out. Two species are known to live in Sri Lanka.

=== Family: Bittacidae - hangingflies ===
- Bittacus henryi
- Bittacus insularis

== Stoneflies ==
Phylum: Arthropoda
Class: Insecta
Order: Plecoptera

Plecoptera is an insect order with about 3,500 described species with worldwide distribution. They are one of the most primitive winged insects. The body is very simple, chewing mandibles, large compound eyes with two or three ocelli. Detailed work on plecopterans in Sri Lanka not yet carried out. Eight species within two families are known to live in Sri Lanka.

=== Family: Perlidae ===
- Neoperla angulate
- Neoperla inexspectata
- Neoperla triangulate
- Phanoperla nana
- Phanoperla srilanka
- Phanoperla testacea
- Phanoperla wedda

=== Family: Polyplacidae - spiny rat lice ===
- Neohaematopinus ceylonicus
