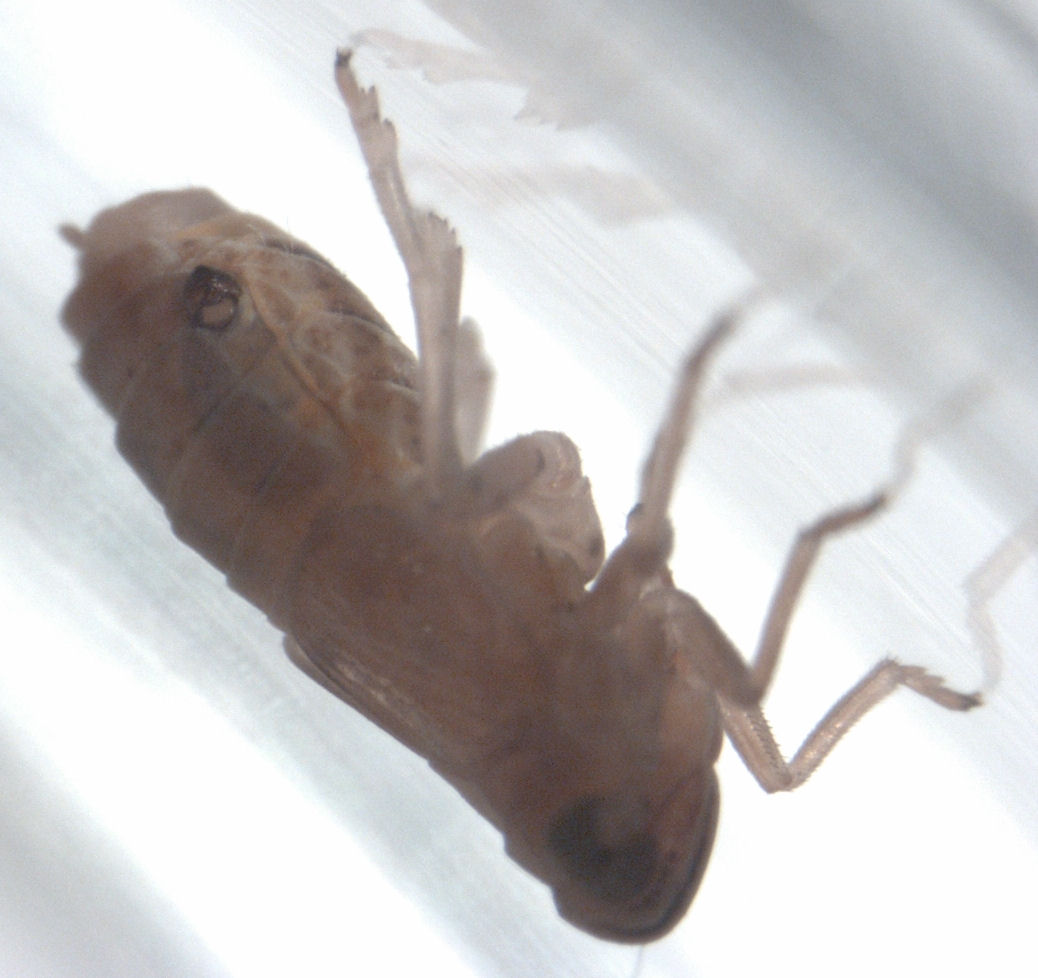
- Delphacid stylopised by Elenchus maorianus (protruding female)

Scientific classification
- Domain: Eukaryota
- Kingdom: Animalia
- Phylum: Arthropoda
- Class: Insecta
- Order: Strepsiptera
- Family: Elenchidae
- Genus: Elenchus
- Species: E. maorianus

Binomial name
- Elenchus maorianus Gourlay, 1953

= Elenchus maorianus =

Species of insect

Elenchus maorianus is a parasitic insect species in the genus Elenchus found in New Zealand.
