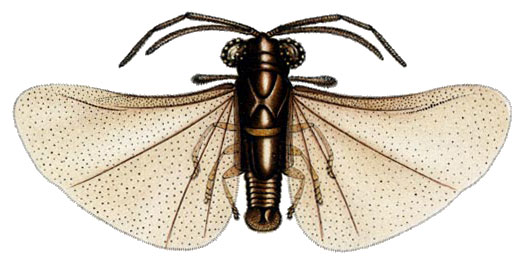

Scientific classification
- Kingdom: Animalia
- Phylum: Arthropoda
- Class: Insecta
- Order: Strepsiptera
- Family: Myrmecolacidae
- Genus: Caenocholax
- Species: C. fenyesi

Binomial name
- Caenocholax fenyesi Pierce, 1909

= Caenocholax fenyesi =

Species of insect

Caenocholax fenyesi is a species of twisted-winged parasitic insects in the order Strepsiptera and family Myrmecolacidae. It has a sporadic distribution throughout North America, Central America, and South America. Chaenochlax brasiliensis (Oliveira and Kogan 1959) is the only other named species in the genus.

C. fenyesi displays heterotrophic heteronomy, where males and females occupy different hosts. Females are endoparasites throughout their lifecycle and parasitize members of Orthoptera, while larval stage males are endoparasites of Solenopsis invicta, the red imported fire ant, and are free-living as adults. Males in Arizona, Mexico, Central America, and parts of South America have performed a host switch and parasitize native fire ants closely related to S. invicta. They are highly virulent in their adult hosts, but not in their larval hosts due to a slower growth rate in larval stages.

== Taxonomy ==
Subspecies are cryptic and are morphologically similar, but genetically different. These three subspecies belong to the species Caenocholax fenyesi:

- Caenocholax fenyesi fenyesi Pierce, 1909
- Caenocholax fenyesi texensis Kathirithamby & Johnston, 2004
- Caenocholax fenyesi waloffi Kathirithamby & Johnston, 2004

== Phylogeny and Genetic Structure ==
Phylogenetic relationships are inferred based on the morphology of adults and specific host associations. Cryptic diversity and genetic divergence over large distances have been observed, causing an effect of genetic bottlenecking. This makes the extinction of C. fenyesi highly probable, but new populations may become established when mated larvae successfully disperse larvae across long distances.

== Distribution ==
C. fenyesi is distributed throughout the southern United States, Central America, and South America. Overall distribution in the United States includes Florida, New Orleans, southern and central Louisiana, Mississippi, Georgia, Arizona, Alabama, and Texas. In the Neotropics, they are found in Cordoba, Mexico; Tabasco, Mexico; Peten, Guatemala; Metagalpa, Nicaragua; Costa Rica; Panama; Ecuador; Chile; Missiones, Argentina; Andros Island, Bahamas; and Cuba. Individuals live in small numbers in close proximity due to the adult male's short lifespan.

== Habitat ==
Because males and females parasitize different insects, their respective habitats depend on host preferences and the intersection of the habitat and range of their different hosts. Males, along with their ant hosts, are less common in grassland habitats. There is not enough time for males to develop, establish, and occupy their own unique habitat.

Local dispersal allows C. fenyesi to persist in a small area. However, dispersal of larvae is extremely restricted because reproducing females must depend on a new orthopteran host for the larvae. Males depend on a new ant host, which are difficult to find because ants usually stay close to their nest^{[3]}. Poorly developed flight and short lifespans also constrain dispersal by males. Overall, dispersal of male first instar larvae is extremely limited because adult and nymph stages of the ant host live within the same habitat.

== Reproduction and Development ==
Sexual selection in C. fenyesi occurs via sensory exploitation. Females are not choosy about mates, but males are choosy and will show no interest in copulation or mating if a female is currently carrying embryos at an advanced stage of development. If the male is unsuccessful at stimulating the female during courtship, she will reject him. The head is the only part on the female's body that the male has contact with during insemination.

=== Generalized Lifecycle ===
Females do not have a pupal instar stage. Oocytes float freely in her haemolymph and she may produce up to 750,000 embryos. Fertilization occurs by means of haemocoelic insemination and reproduction occurs by means of haemocoelous viviparity. Motile first instar larvae are released through the brood canal opening in the female's cephalothorax. When males find their ant host, the first instar larvae go through hypermetamorphosis, bore through the cuticle, and moult into the second instar larvae.

Males moult several times and develop according to the following stages:

1. Prepupa: Prefrontal nervous system develops and complex eyes and wings develop further.
2. Pupa: Wings and genitalia grow to full size.
3. Subimago: Wings remain in their sheath.
4. Imago: Cuticles from the prepupal, pupal, and subimaginal stages are shed; wings are fully inflated and flight muscles are developed; sperm matures.

Males emerge from the host when they reach adulthood and immediately begin to fly and search for a female to mate with. Their adult lifespan is usually a few hours, but may be up to a few days.

=== Copulation ===
Females send out sex hormones to attract a male^{[6]}. The male strikes the female's cephalothorax with his tarsi during courtship to stimulate her^{[6]}. Copulation may occur for up to a minute and multiple times before the male begins searching for another female to mate with^{[6]}.

=== Parasitism ===
Each host is occupied by one individual. The first instar larvae of males must reach an ant colony to parasitize larvae and pupae, which is accomplished by travelling with a foraging ant. This gives them a host with a long enough lifespan for development. As koinobionts, the host of C. fenyesi continues to develop after parasitization. The host's life is lengthened to allow males to mature and females to release the first instar larvae when the next generation of the host's larvae are produced. The original host was assumed to be the black fire ant (Solenopsis richteri) in MesoAmerica, which switched to the red imported fire ant in the southern United States.

== Anatomy ==
Males and females of C. fenyesi are sexually dimorphic. There are four larval stages, but only three have been described. Larval stages are named secondary and tertiary stages based on morphological characteristics, but are not necessarily sequential stages. Endoparasitic larval stages experience apolysis, but no ecdysis. First instar larvae are free-living, while secondary and tertiary larvae are endoparasitic in both males and females. The sex of individuals can be determined by the time they reach the second instar stage. By the third instar stage, males have three pairs of prolegs and a bulbous head; while females have a rounded "head" region and tapering abdomen. The first four abdominal segments have sensory bristles in all larval stages.

=== First Instar Larvae ===
The function of the first instar is to find a suitable host. Physical environmental conditions affect the lifespan at this stage, so it is short-lived. At this stage, individuals have a scleratized cuticle and are brown and 70-80 um long, not including the caudal filaments. Ventral regions of the head, thorax, and abdomen are serrated, and dorsal and lateral surfaces are mainly smooth. Legs are slender and spined, and tarsi have single joints, no claws, and ventral modifications to resemble adhesive pads.

There are three pairs of pits on the dorsal surface of the head. There are three ocelli 3-4 um in diameter; one located ventrally and two dorsally/ventrally. There is a distinct invagination on the median anterior margin. Antennae are positioned lateral to the mouth and appear filiform but have also been described as having three segments with a long arista on the second segment.

Each segment of the thorax has spiny sternal sclerites, a pair of dorsal pits, and a ventral-lateral pair of pits. Some spines and serrations extend from the edge of the segment on the ventral side^{[1]}. Tarsi on the legs of the prothorax and mesothorax have pads. The metathorax has three finger-like projections anteriorly to each coxa.

The abdomen has 10 segments with short, spiky projections on the lateral surface and serrations, spines, and two pairs of setal bristles on the ventral surface. Segments 1-4 have a pair of ventral-lateral setaceous spines that are 4.5 um long^{[1]}. Segments 4-7 each have a pair of 0.5-1.5 um-long spines on the ventral posterior edge. Segments 7-10 have small, broad serrations on the posterior sternum ventrally. There are two pairs of bristly lateral/dorsal setae 11 um long on segment 9 and one pair of 40. um-long caudal filaments on segment 10, which are used for jumping.

=== Secondary Larvae ===
Individuals at this stage are 200-350 um in size and light brown, with a rounded head and membraneous cuticle. There are 13 differentiated segments, but the last two segments are narrower than the others.

=== Tertiary Larvae ===
This stage is similar to the secondary larva, but individuals are much larger at 600-700 um in size, and the head is less rounded and cap-like with a broadly pointed anterior end.

=== Adult Female Anatomy ===
Females are wingless, eyeless, and possess no antennae, mouthparts, legs, or external genitalia. They are relatively large in size at 1.5-3.9 mm. Female first instar larvae are 0.89 mm long. The female's head is vestigial and is fused to the reduced, indistinct segments of the thorax. The mandibles have several spines on the inner surface. The cephalothorax is 0.55 mm long and 0.43 mm wide, light brown, and lies flat on the host's abdomen and extrudes through the host's abdominal pleurites. The brood canal opening is 0.18 mm long and 0.33 mm wide. The second and third abdominal segments have a genital aperture.

=== Adult Male Anatomy ===
Males range in size from 1.5 to 6 mm. They have short forewings and large, fan-like hindwings with reduced venation. Eyes have 15-150 individual ommatidia separated by bridges covered with microtrichia. Mouthparts are blade-like mandibles and maxillae. Males have an inconspicuous prothorax. Fore and midlegs have no trochanters and tarsi have 2-5 segments. There are spines on the tarsi, tibia, and femora on all pairs of legs and the tibia and femora are larger on the third pair of legs. The aedeagus is located on the ninth abdominal segment and is overhung by the tenth segment.

== Biological Control in Red Imported Fire Ants (S. invicta) ==
C. fenyesi has been suggested as a potential agent for the biological control of the red imported fire ant, S. invicta in the United States and Australia. When parasitized by C. fenyesi, red imported fire ants climb to a high perch and assume a gaster flagging posture and remain in this position until C. fenyesi emerges.

S. invicta was introduced into the United States from South America in the early 1900s and have since expanded their range to cover more than 129.5 million hectares. Chemical insecticides are commonly used for controlling their populations but because S. invicta has no natural enemies in North America, this is only a temporary solution and many biological control agents have been suggested. However, this parasite of fire ants has a low rate of parasitization and currently more research is required to determine if C. fenyesi can be used as a reliable biocontrol of S. invicta.
