= E. walkeri =

E. walkeri may refer to:

- Elenchus walkeri, a synonym for Elenchus tenuicornis, an insect species
- Eleutherodactylus walkeri, a frog species endemic to Ecuador
