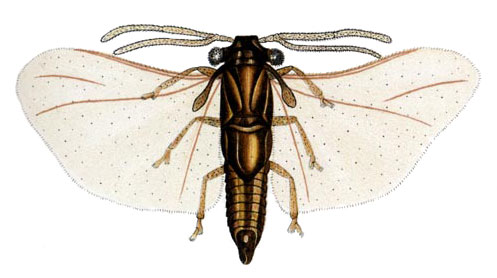
- Elenchus koebelei

Scientific classification
- Domain: Eukaryota
- Kingdom: Animalia
- Phylum: Arthropoda
- Class: Insecta
- Order: Strepsiptera
- Family: Elenchidae
- Genus: Elenchus; John Curtis, 1831

Species
- Elenchus koebelei Elenchus maorianus Elenchus tenuicornis

= Elenchus (insect) =

Genus of insects

Elenchus is an insect genus in the family Elenchidae.
