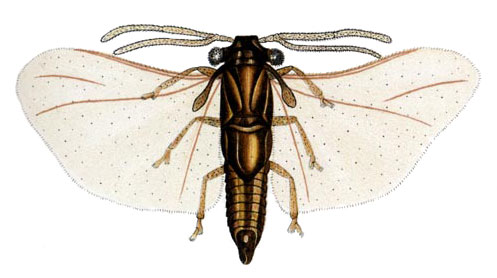

Scientific classification
- Kingdom: Animalia
- Phylum: Arthropoda
- Class: Insecta
- Order: Strepsiptera
- Family: Elenchidae
- Genus: Elenchus
- Species: E. koebelei

Binomial name
- Elenchus koebelei (Pierce, 1908)

= Elenchus koebelei =

Species of insect

Elenchus koebelei is an insect species in the genus Elenchus. It is a parasitoid of Prokelisia, found in Florida salt marshes.
