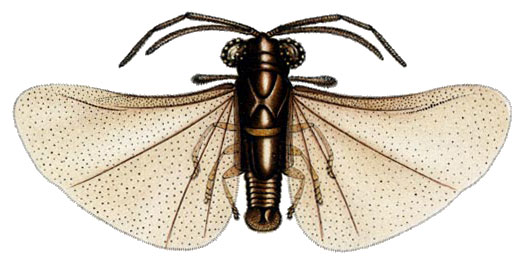
- Caenocholax fenyesi

Scientific classification
- Domain: Eukaryota
- Kingdom: Animalia
- Phylum: Arthropoda
- Class: Insecta
- Order: Strepsiptera
- Family: Myrmecolacidae
- Genus: Caenocholax; Pierce, 1909

= Caenocholax =

Genus of insects

Caenocholax is a genus of twisted-winged insects in the family Myrmecolacidae. There are about nine described species in Caenocholax.

== Species ==
These nine species belong to the genus Caenocholax:

- Caenocholax barkleyi Antell & Kathirithamby, 2016
- Caenocholax brasiliensis Oliveira & Kogan, 1959
- Caenocholax brodzinsky Kathirithamby & Grimaldi, 1993
- Caenocholax brodzinskyi Kathirithamby & Grimaldi, 1993
- Caenocholax dominicensis Kathirithamby & Grimaldi, 1993
- Caenocholax fenyesi Pierce, 1909 (Fenyes' strepsiptera)
- Caenocholax groehni Kathirithamby & Henderickx, 2008
- Caenocholax palusaxus Antell & Kathirithamby, 2016
- Caenocholax vilhenai Luna de Carvalho, 1956
