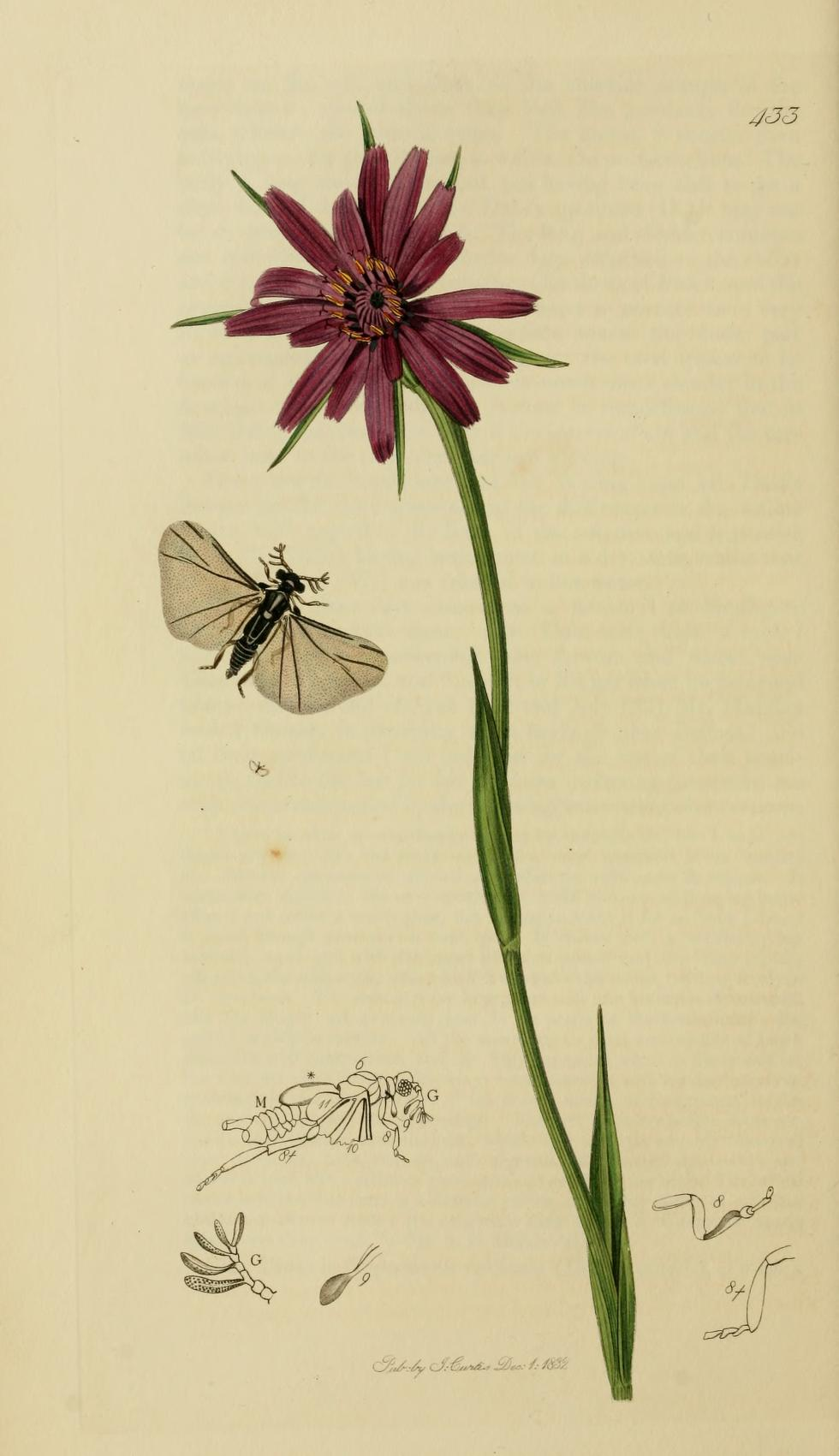
- Halictophagus curtisii illustration from British Entomology

Scientific classification
- Kingdom: Animalia
- Phylum: Arthropoda
- Class: Insecta
- Order: Strepsiptera
- Family: Halictophagidae
- Genus: Halictophagus

Species
- See text.

= Halictophagus =

Genus of insects

Halictophagus is a genus of insects in the family Halictophagidae.

== Species ==
- H. abdominalis Kathirithamby, 1993
- H. acutus Bohart, 1943
- H. americanus Perkins, 1905
- H. ancylophallus Kifune & Hirashima, 1989
- H. angustipes Kifune & Hirashima, 1989
- H. antennalus Kathirithamby, 1993
- H. australensis Perkins, 1905
- Halictophagus compactus (Pierce, 1914)
