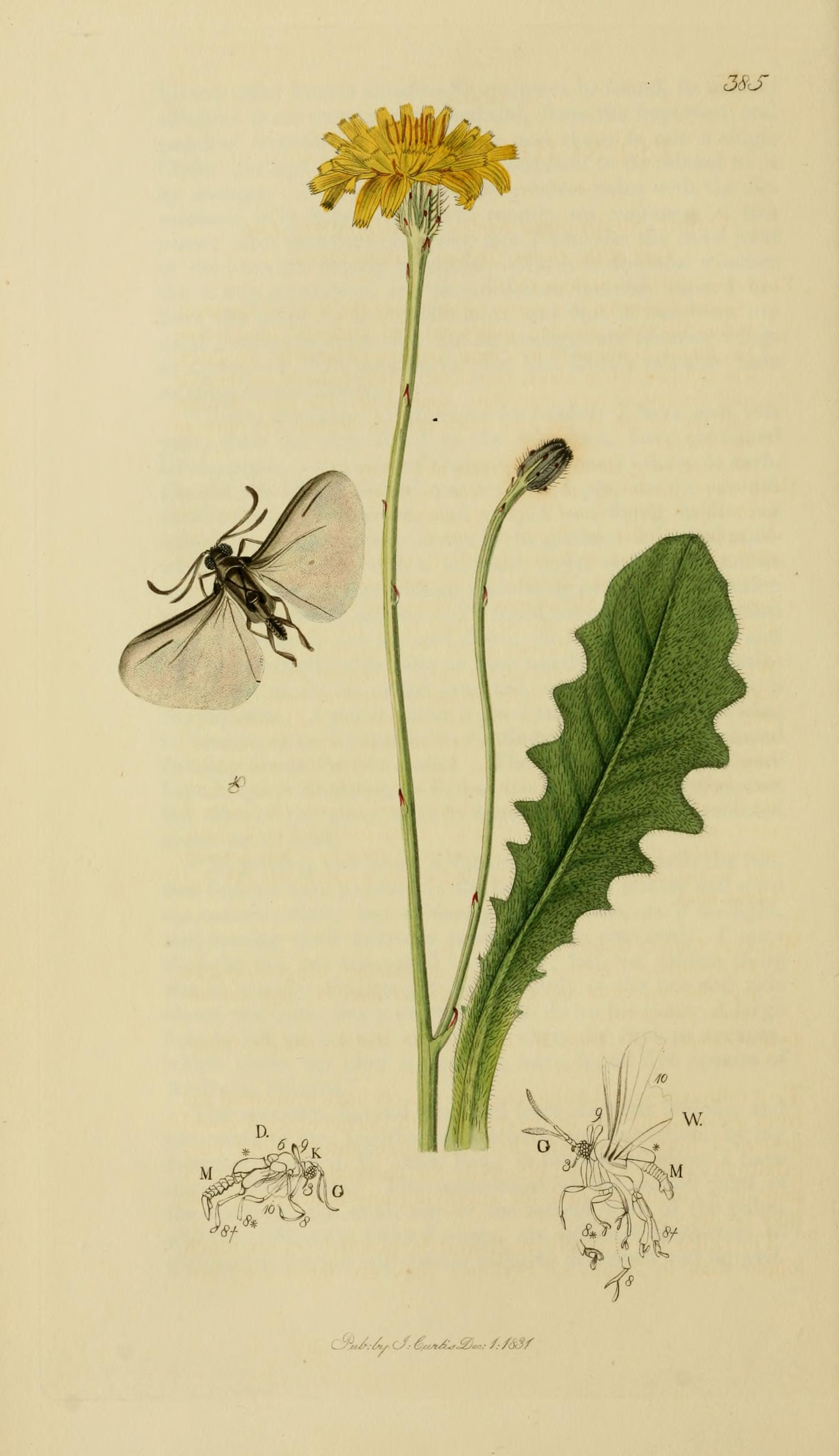
- Elenchus tenuicornis

Scientific classification
- Domain: Eukaryota
- Kingdom: Animalia
- Phylum: Arthropoda
- Class: Insecta
- Order: Strepsiptera
- Family: Elenchidae
- Genus: Elenchus
- Species: E. tenuicornis

Binomial name
- Elenchus tenuicornis (Kirby, 1815)

Synonyms
- Elenchus walkeri

= Elenchus tenuicornis =

Species of insect

Elenchus tenuicornis is an insect species in the genus Elenchus.

Media related to Elenchus tenuicornis at Wikimedia Commons
