= Graphitarsus =

Scientific classification
- Kingdom: Animalia
- Phylum: Arthropoda
- Clade: Pancrustacea
- Class: Insecta
- Order: Archaeognatha
- Family: Machilidae
- Genus: Graphitarsus; Silvestri, 1908

Type species
- Graphitarsus maindronii

Genus of jumping bristletails

Graphitarsus is a genus of jumping bristletails in the family Machilidae.

== Species ==
There are 8 species:

- Graphitarsus javanicus Wygodzinsky, 1953
- Graphitarsus surindicus Kapur, 1981
- Graphitarsus schmidi Eason, 1965
- Graphitarsus phillipsi Paclt, 1957
- Graphitarsus sumatranus Wygodzinsky, 1988
- Graphitarsus maindronii Silvestri, 1908

=== Subgenus Hybographitarsus ===
- Graphitarsus zebu Paclt, 1969
- Graphitarsus riedeli Sturm, 2001
