= Bohartilla =

Scientific classification
- Domain: Eukaryota
- Kingdom: Animalia
- Phylum: Arthropoda
- Class: Insecta
- Order: Strepsiptera
- Family: Bohartillidae; Kinzelbach, 1969
- Genus: Bohartilla; Kinzelbach, 1969

Genus of insects

Bohartilla is a genus of insects belonging to the monotypic family Bohartillidae.

The species of this genus are found in Caribbean.

Species:

- Bohartilla joachimscheveni Kinzelbach & Pohl, 1994
- Bohartilla kinzelbachi Kathirithamby & Grimaldi, 1993
- Bohartilla megalognatha Kinzelbach, 1969
