= Hemipsocus =

Scientific classification
- Domain: Eukaryota
- Kingdom: Animalia
- Phylum: Arthropoda
- Class: Insecta
- Order: Psocodea
- Family: Hemipsocidae
- Genus: Hemipsocus; Selys-Longchamps, 1872

Genus of booklice

Hemipsocus is a genus of leaf litter barklice in the family Hemipsocidae. There are about 17 described species in Hemipsocus.

== Species ==
These 17 species belong to the genus Hemipsocus:

- Hemipsocus africanus Enderlein, 1907
- Hemipsocus chloroticus (Hagen, 1858)
- Hemipsocus fasciatus Badonnel, 1967
- Hemipsocus funebris Badonnel, 1969
- Hemipsocus luridus Enderlein, 1903
- Hemipsocus maculatus New, 1973
- Hemipsocus massulatus Li, 2002
- Hemipsocus mauritianus Turner, 1976
- Hemipsocus ornatus Datta, 1969
- Hemipsocus pallidus New & Thornton, 1975
- Hemipsocus parallelicus Li, 1996
- Hemipsocus pardus Smithers, 1964
- Hemipsocus pretiosus Banks, 1930
- Hemipsocus roseus (Hagen, 1859)
- Hemipsocus rubellis Navas, 1934
- Hemipsocus selysi Banks, 1918
- Hemipsocus turneri Badonnel, 1977
