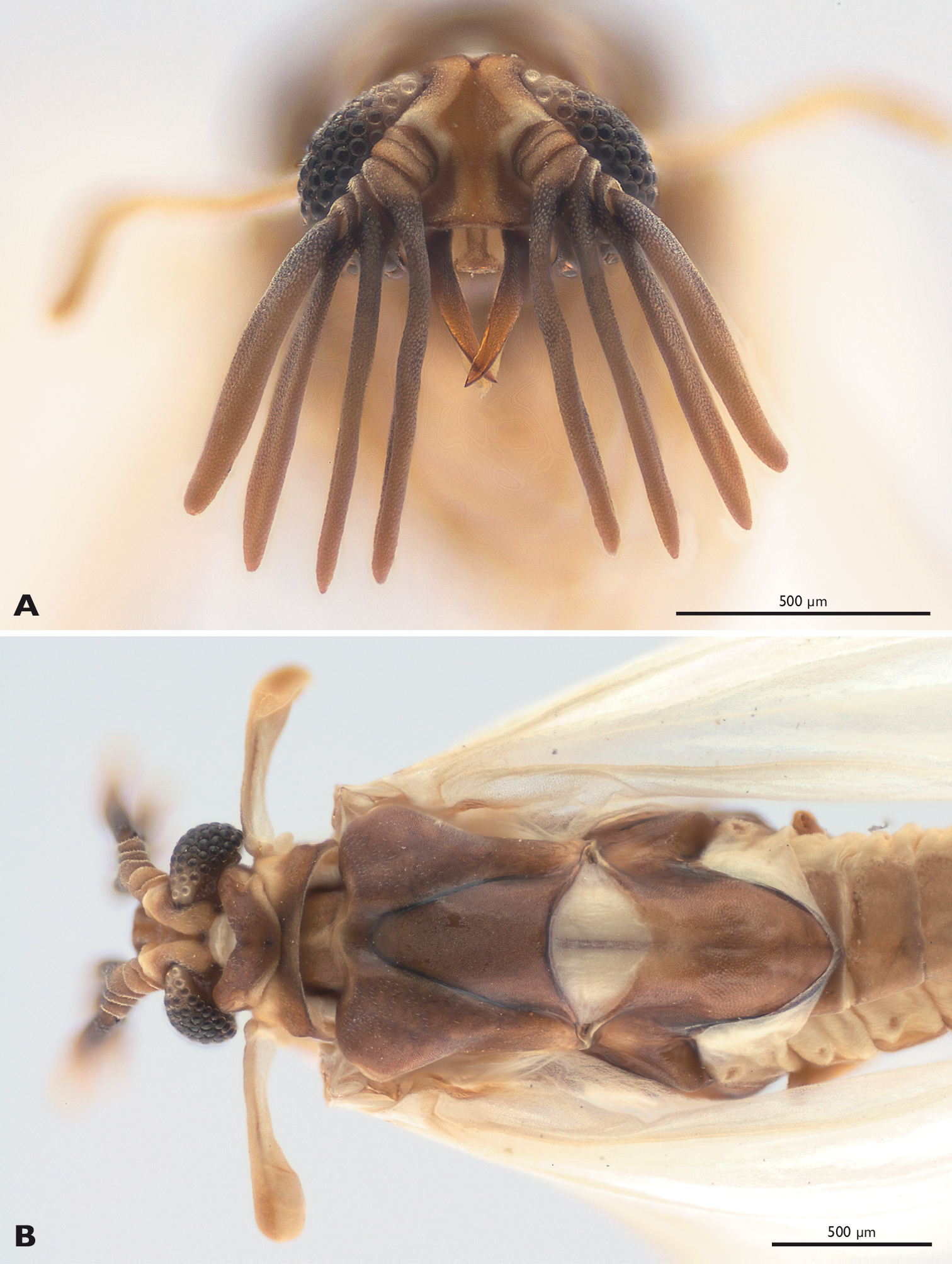

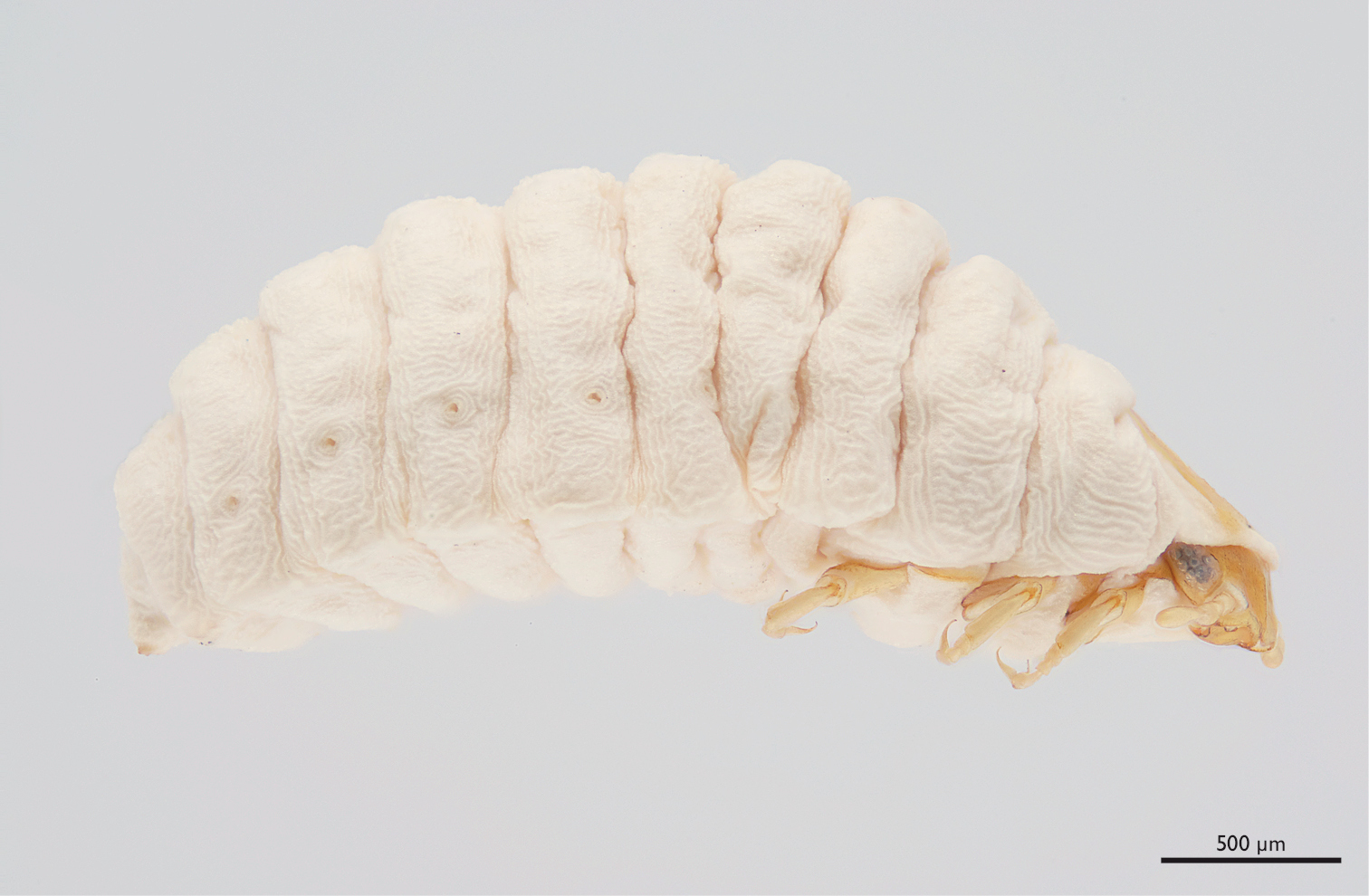
- Male (top) and female (bottom) of Mengenilla moldrzyki

Scientific classification
- Kingdom: Animalia
- Phylum: Arthropoda
- Clade: Pancrustacea
- Class: Insecta
- Order: Strepsiptera
- Family: Mengenillidae; Hofeneder, 1910

Genera
- See text

= Mengenillidae =

Family of insects

Mengenillidae is a family of insects belonging to the order Strepsiptera. The Bahiaxenidae are sister to all other Strepsipteran lineages; within that group, the Mengenillidae are sister to all remaining lineages. Unlike members of Stylopidia, which contains the vast majority of strepsipterans, the adult females of the family are free-living with legs. Members of the family with known hosts (Eoxenos and Mengenilla) parasitise members of the family Lepismatidae (silverfish and kin).

== Genera ==
After

- Ceanocholax
- Congoxenos Kinzelbach, 1972
- Eoxenos Peyerimhoff, 1919
- Mengenilla Hofeneder, 1910
- Trilineatoxenos de Carvalho, 2007
- Yemengenilla Luna de Carvalho, 1992
