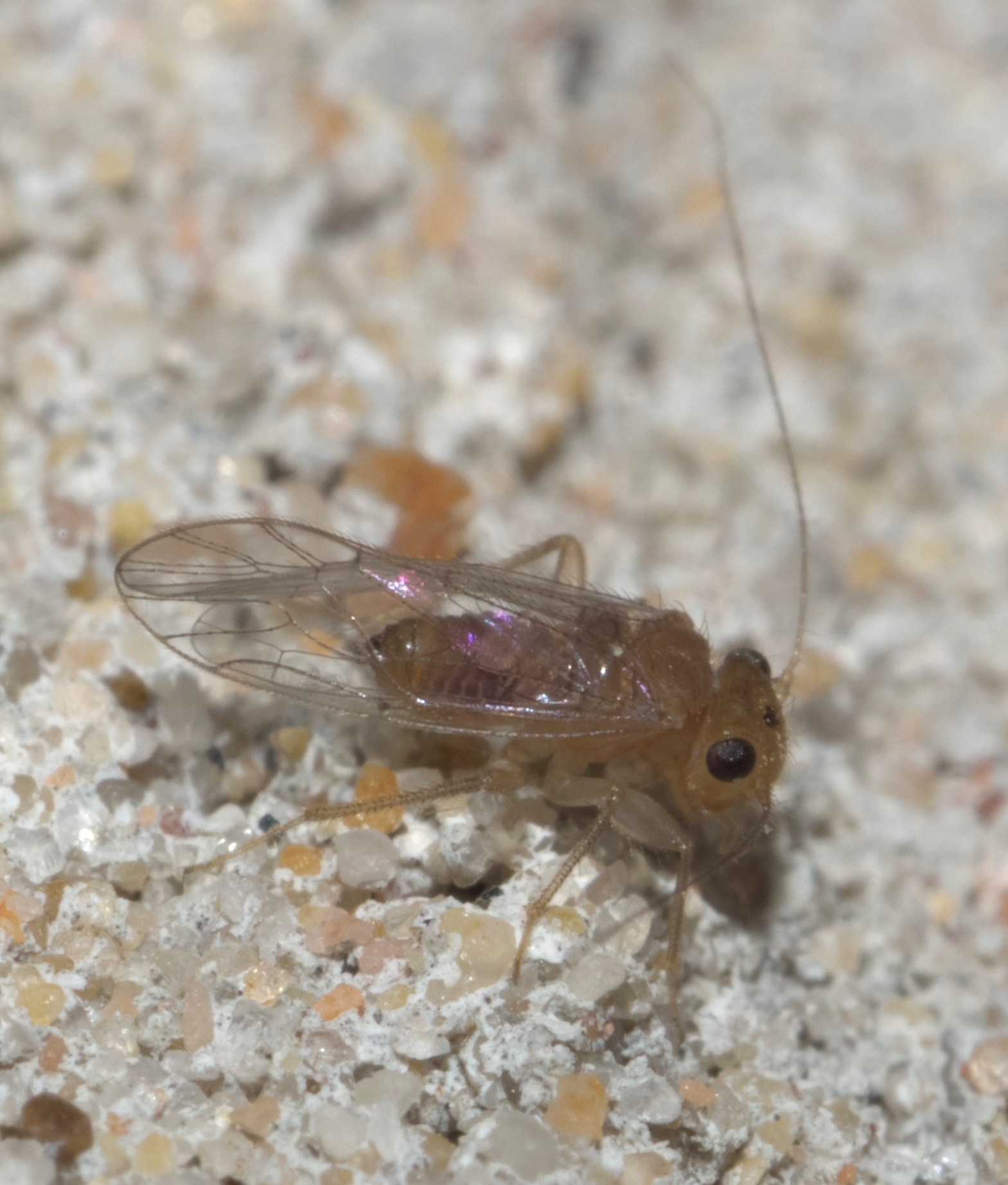
- Hemipsocus chloroticus, Oklahoma

Scientific classification
- Domain: Eukaryota
- Kingdom: Animalia
- Phylum: Arthropoda
- Class: Insecta
- Order: Psocodea
- Family: Hemipsocidae
- Genus: Hemipsocus
- Species: H. chloroticus

Binomial name
- Hemipsocus chloroticus (Hagen, 1858)

= Hemipsocus chloroticus =

Species of booklouse

Hemipsocus chloroticus is a species of leaf litter barklouse in the family Hemipsocidae. It is found in Africa, Central America, North America, Oceania, and Southern Asia.
