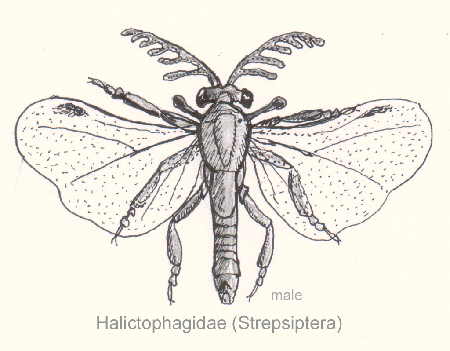

Scientific classification
- Domain: Eukaryota
- Kingdom: Animalia
- Phylum: Arthropoda
- Class: Insecta
- Order: Strepsiptera
- Suborder: Stylopidia
- Superfamily: Stylopoidea
- Family: Halictophagidae; Perkins, 1905

Genera
- See text

Synonyms
- Callipharixenidae

= Halictophagidae =

Family of insects

Halictophagidae are an insect family of the order Strepsiptera.

== Genera ==
- Blattodeaphagus Kathirithamby, 1992
- Callipharixenos Pierce, 1918
- Coriophagus Kinzelbach, 1971
- Dipterophagus Drew and Allwood, 1985
- Halictophagus Curtis, 1831
- Membracixenos Pierce, 1952
- Stenocranophilus Pierce, 1914
- Tridactylophagus Subramaniam, 1932
