= Bahiaxenos =

Scientific classification
- Kingdom: Animalia
- Phylum: Arthropoda
- Clade: Pancrustacea
- Class: Insecta
- Order: Strepsiptera
- Family: Bahiaxenidae; Bravo, Pohl, Silva-Neto and Beutel, 2009
- Genus: Bahiaxenos; Bravo, Pohl, Silva-Neto and Beutel, 2009
- Species: B. relictus

Binomial name
- Bahiaxenos relictus Bravo, Pohl, Silva-Neto and Beutel, 2009

Genus of insects

Bahiaxenos relictus is the sole member of the family Bahiaxenidae, a type of winged insect. It was only discovered and described in 2009 from relictual sand dunes associated with the Rio São Francisco in Bahia, Brazil. It is considered to be the most basal living member of the order Strepsiptera, so is the sister taxon to the remaining extant species. It is known from only a single male specimen, and its biology is unknown.
