= Graphitarsus schmidi =

Scientific classification
- Kingdom: Animalia
- Phylum: Arthropoda
- Clade: Pancrustacea
- Class: Insecta
- Order: Archaeognatha
- Family: Machilidae
- Genus: Graphitarsus
- Species: G. schmidi

Binomial name
- Graphitarsus schmidi Wygodzinsky, 1957

Species of archaeognatha

Graphitarsus schmidi is a species in the genus Graphitarsus of the family Machilidae which belongs to the insect order Archaeognatha (jumping bristletails).
