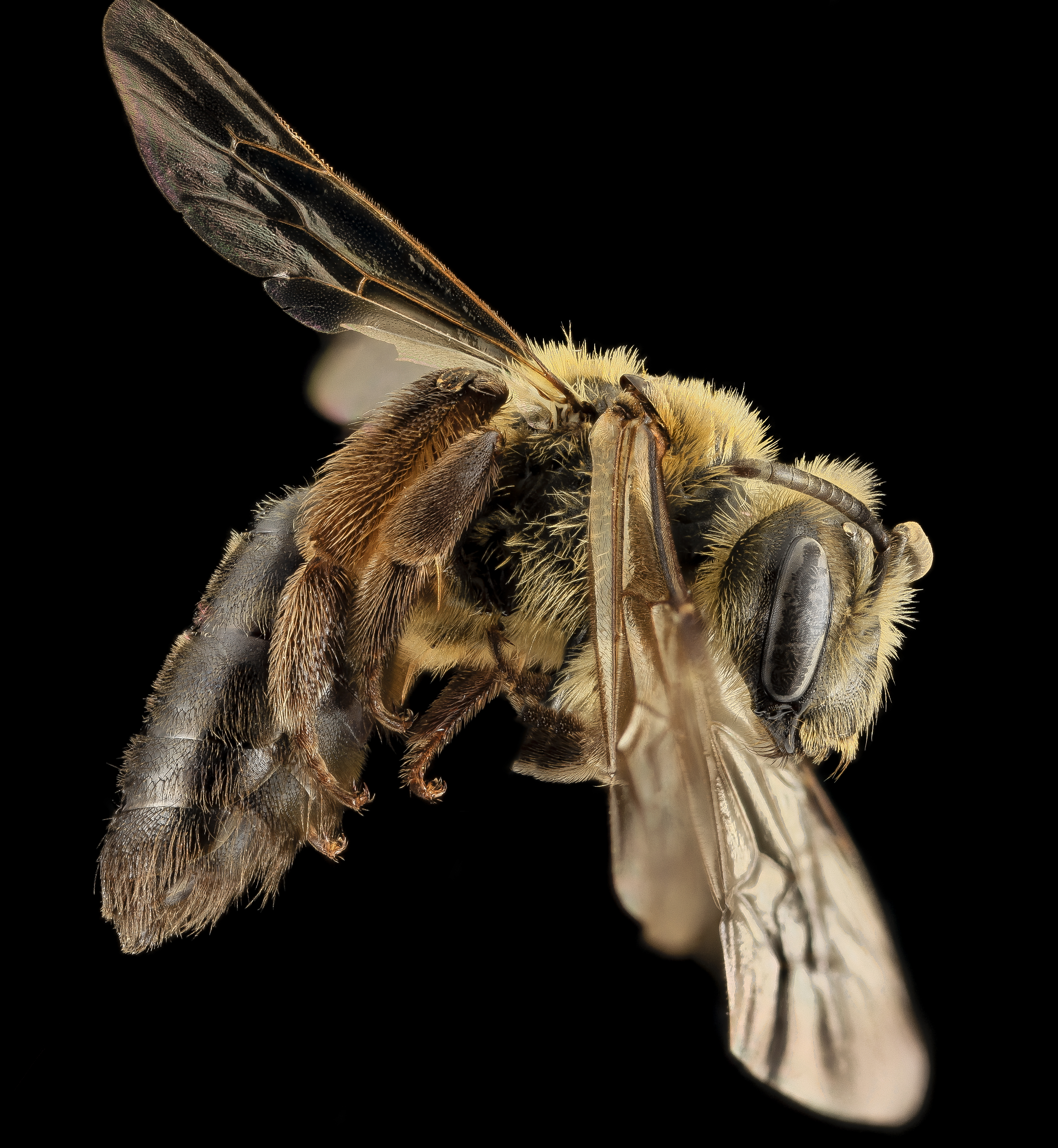

Scientific classification
- Domain: Eukaryota
- Kingdom: Animalia
- Phylum: Arthropoda
- Class: Insecta
- Order: Hymenoptera
- Family: Andrenidae
- Genus: Andrena
- Species: A. nivalis

Binomial name
- Andrena nivalis Smith, 1853

= Andrena nivalis =

Species of bee

Andrena nivalis, the snow miner bee, is a species of miner bee in the family Andrenidae. Another common name for this species is the snowy miner. It is found in North America.
