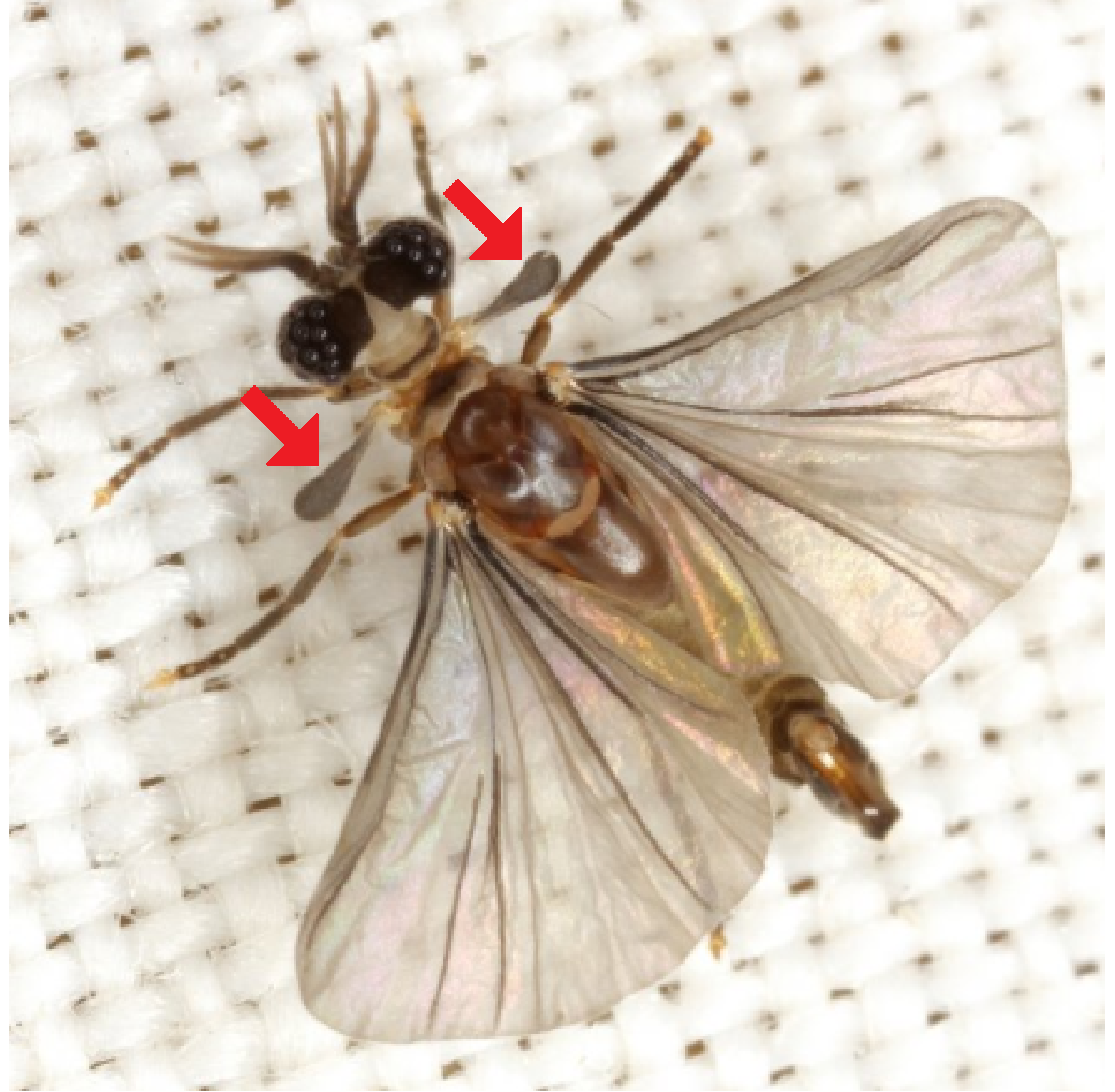
- Unidentified species
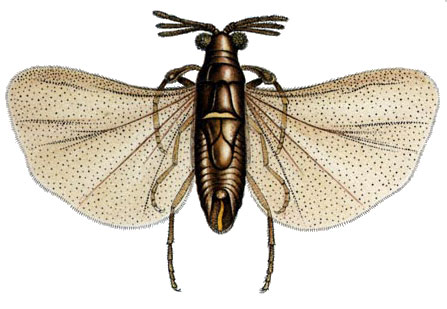
- Triozocera mexicana, male

Scientific classification
- Domain: Eukaryota
- Kingdom: Animalia
- Phylum: Arthropoda
- Class: Insecta
- Order: Strepsiptera
- Suborder: Stylopidia
- Superfamily: Stylopoidea
- Family: Corioxenidae; Kinzelbach, 1970

Subfamilies and genera
- See text.

= Corioxenidae =

Family of insects

The Corioxenidae are an insect family of the order Strepsiptera. Species in this family are parasites of heteropteran bugs including the Pentatomidae, Scutelleridae, Cydnidae, Coreidae, and Lygaeidae. The males lack mandibles. Three subfamilies within this family are recognized. The subfamilies are separated using the morphology of the males, particularly on the basis of the number of tarsi and the presence of tarsal claws.

- Corioxeninae Kinzelbach, 1970
  - Corioxenos Blair, 1936
  - Floridoxenos Kathirithamby and Peck, 1994
  - Loania Kinzelbach, 1970
  - Perissozocera Johnson, 1976
  - Australoxenos Kathirithamby, 1990
  - Blissoxenos Miyamoto & Kifune, 1984
  - Malayaxenos Kifune, 1981
  - Mufagaa Kinzelbach, 1980
  - Viridipromontorius Luna de Carvalho, 1985
- Triozocerinae Kinzelbach, 1970
  - Triozocera Pierce, 1909
  - Dundoxenos Luna de Carvalho, 1956
- Uniclavinae Kathirithamby, 1989
  - Uniclavus Kathirithamby, 1989
  - Proceroxenos Pohl, Katbeh-Bader & Schneider, 1996
