= Pristimantis walkeri =

Conservation status
- Least Concern (IUCN 3.1)

Scientific classification
- Kingdom: Animalia
- Phylum: Chordata
- Class: Amphibia
- Order: Anura
- Clade: Brachycephaloidea
- Family: Craugastoridae
- Genus: Pristimantis
- Species: P. walkeri

Binomial name
- Pristimantis walkeri (Lynch, 1974)

Synonyms
- Eleutherodactylus walkeri Lynch, 1974

Species of frog

Pristimantis walkeri is a species of frog in the family Strabomantidae. It is endemic to Ecuador. Its natural habitats are tropical dry forests, moist lowland forests, moist montane forests, plantations, rural gardens, and heavily degraded former forest. It is threatened by habitat loss.
