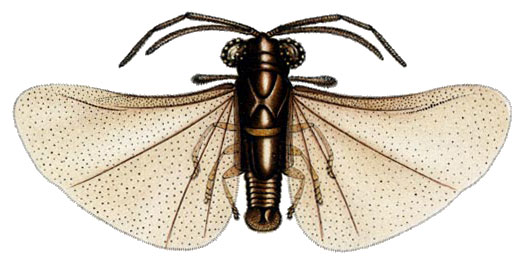
- Caenocholax fenyesi (male)

Scientific classification
- Kingdom: Animalia
- Phylum: Arthropoda
- Clade: Pancrustacea
- Class: Insecta
- Order: Strepsiptera
- Suborder: Stylopidia
- Superfamily: Stylopoidea
- Family: Myrmecolacidae; Saunders, 1872

Genera
- See text.

= Myrmecolacidae =

Family of insects

Myrmecolacidae is an insect family of the order Strepsiptera. There are four genera and about 98 species in this family. Like all strepsipterans, they have a parasitic mode of development with males parasitizing ants while the females develop inside Orthoptera. The sexes differ greatly in morphology making it very difficult to match females to the better catalogued museum specimens of males.

== Genera ==
- Caenocholax Pierce, 1909
- Lychnocolax
- Myrmecolax
- Stichotrema Hofeneder, 1910
