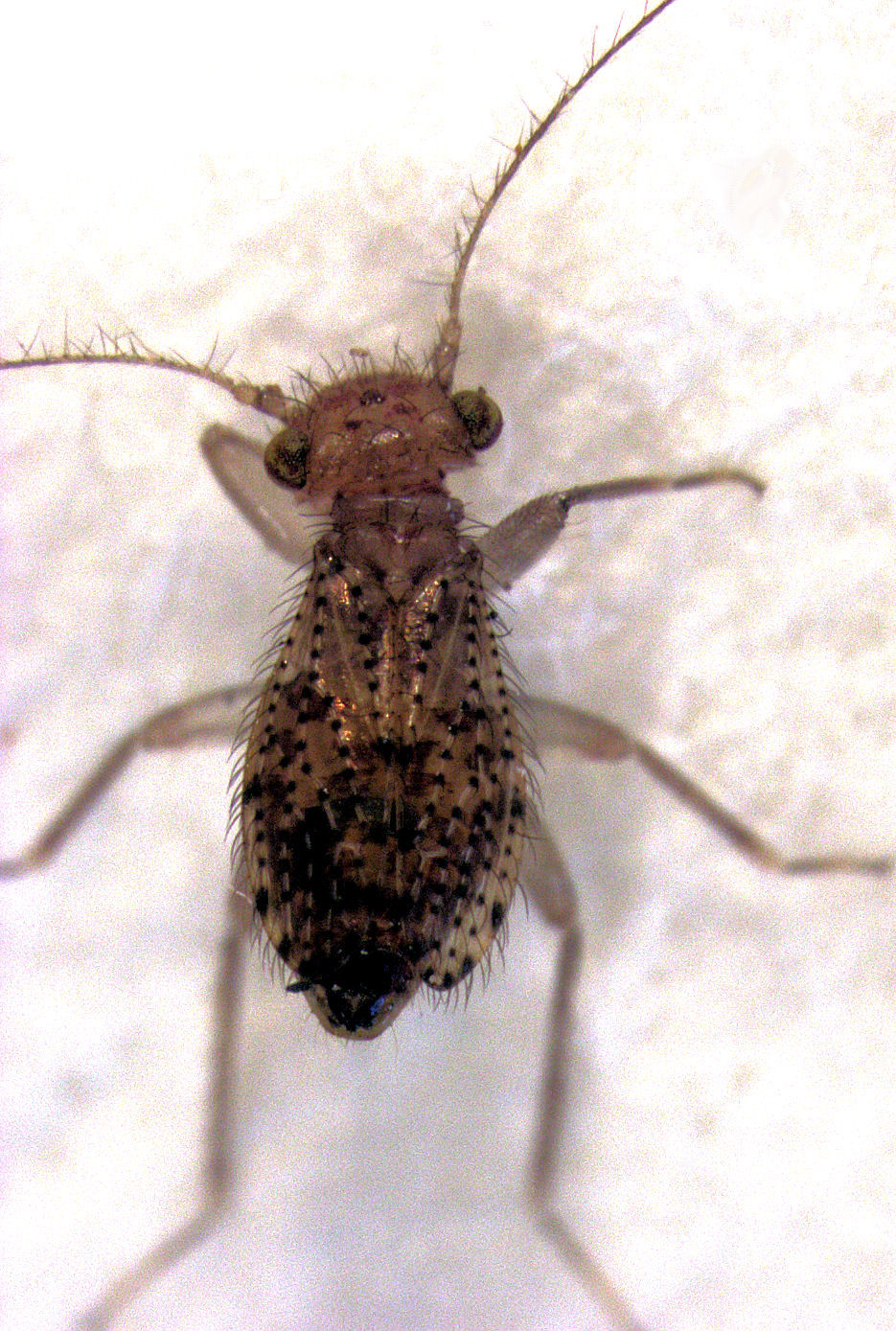

Scientific classification
- Kingdom: Animalia
- Phylum: Arthropoda
- Clade: Pancrustacea
- Class: Insecta
- Order: Psocodea
- Suborder: Psocomorpha
- Infraorder: Psocetae
- Family: Hemipsocidae

Genera
- Anopistoscena; Hemipsocus; Metahemipsocus

= Hemipsocidae =

Family of booklice

Hemipsocidae is an insect family of Psocodea (formerly Psocoptera) belonging to the infraorder Psocetae. Members of the family have the areola postica joined to the M vein by a crossvein, and their M vein is two-branched. This family comprises twenty-four species in three genera: Anopistoscena, Hemipsocus, and Metahemipsocus. They are commonly known as leaf litter barklice.
