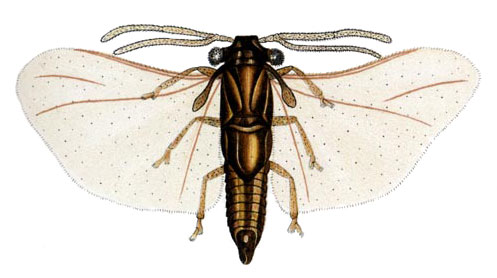
- Elenchus koebelei

Scientific classification
- Domain: Eukaryota
- Kingdom: Animalia
- Phylum: Arthropoda
- Class: Insecta
- Order: Strepsiptera
- Family: Elenchidae; Perkins, 1905

Genera
- Colacina; Deinelenchus; Elencholax; Elenchus

= Elenchidae =

Family of insects

The Elenchidae are an insect family in the order Strepsiptera.
