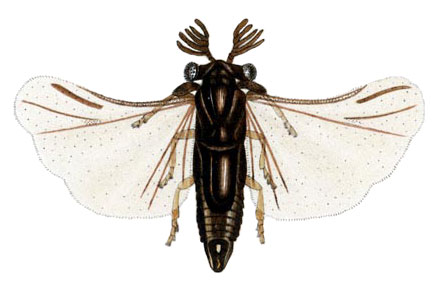
- Male
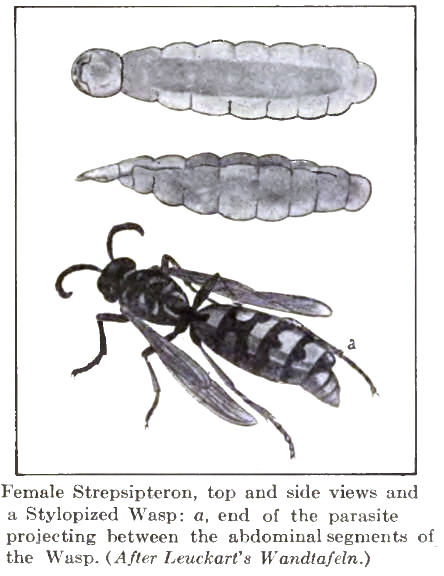
- Stylopid female and a wasp host

Scientific classification
- Kingdom: Animalia
- Phylum: Arthropoda
- Clade: Pancrustacea
- Class: Insecta
- Clade: Holometabola
- Clade: Aparaglossata
- Clade: Neuropteroidea
- Clade: Coleopterida
- Order: Strepsiptera; Kirby, 1813

Families
- †Protoxenidae; †Cretostylopidae; †Phthanoxenidae; †Mengeidae; Bahiaxenidae; Mengenillidae; Stylopidia; Bohartillidae; Callipharixenidae; Corioxenidae; Elenchidae; †Protelencholacidae; Halictophagidae; Myrmecolacidae; Xenidae; Stylopidae

= Strepsiptera =

Strepsiptera Temporal range: 99–0 Ma Middle Cretaceous - recent

Order of insects

Strepsiptera (/strɛpˈsɪptərə/), from Ancient Greek στρέψις (strépsis), meaning "turning around", and πτερόν (pterón), meaning "wing", are an order of insects with eleven extant families that include about 600 described species. They are endoparasites of other insects, such as bees, wasps, leafhoppers, silverfish, and cockroaches. Females of most species never emerge from the host after entering its body, finally dying inside it. The early-stage larvae do emerge because they must find an unoccupied living host, and the short-lived males must emerge to seek a receptive female in her host. They are believed to be most closely related to beetles, from which they diverged 300–350 million years ago, but do not appear in the fossil record until the mid-Cretaceous around 100 million years ago.

The order is not well known to non-specialists, and the nearest they have to a common name is stylops, in reference to the genus Stylops. The name of the order translates to "twisted wing", giving rise to other common names used for the order, twisted-wing insects and twisted-winged parasites.

Adult males are rarely observed, although specimens may be lured using cages containing virgin females. Nocturnal specimens can also be collected at light traps.

== Biology ==
=== Appearance and structure ===
==== Males ====
Males of the Strepsiptera have wings, legs, eyes, and antennae, though their mouthparts cannot be used for feeding. Many have mouthparts modified into sensory structures. The males bear a superficial resemblance to flies. The forewings are modified into small club-shaped structures called halteres, which sense gyroscopic information. A similar organ exists in flies, though in that group the hindwings are modified instead, and the two groups are thought to have independently evolved the structures. The hindwings are generally fan-shaped, and have strongly reduced venation. The antennae are flabellate, and are covered in specialised chemoreceptors, likely to detect females over long distances.

Adult male Strepsiptera have eyes unlike those of any other insect, resembling the eyes found in the trilobite group Phacopina. Instead of a compound eye consisting of hundreds to thousands of ommatidia, that each produce a pixel of the entire image, the strepsipteran eyes consist of only a few dozen "eyelets" that each produce a complete image. These eyelets are separated by cuticle and/or setae, giving the cluster eye as a whole a blackberry-like appearance.

==== Females ====
The females of Stylopidia, which includes 97% of all described strepsipteran species and all modern strepsipteran families except Mengenillidae and Bahiaxenidae, are not known to leave their hosts and are neotenic in form, lacking wings, legs, and eyes, but have a well sclerotised cephalothorax (fused head and thorax). Adult female mengenillids are wingless but are free living and somewhat mobile with legs and small eyes. This is probably also true for the bahiaxenids, though this has not been observed.

==== Larvae ====
Newly hatched primary (first instar) larvae are on average 230 micrometres (1/128 in) in length, smaller than many single-celled organisms. They are highly mobile with well developed stemmata, which are able to distinguish color. The underside of the body is covered in minute hair-like structures (microtrichia), which allow the larvae to stick to wet surfaces via capillary action. At the back of the body are well developed large bristle-like cerci, which are attached to muscles, which allow the larvae to jump. The tarsal segment of their legs have structures which allow them to cling to their hosts. Later larval instars which develop inside the host are completely immobile.

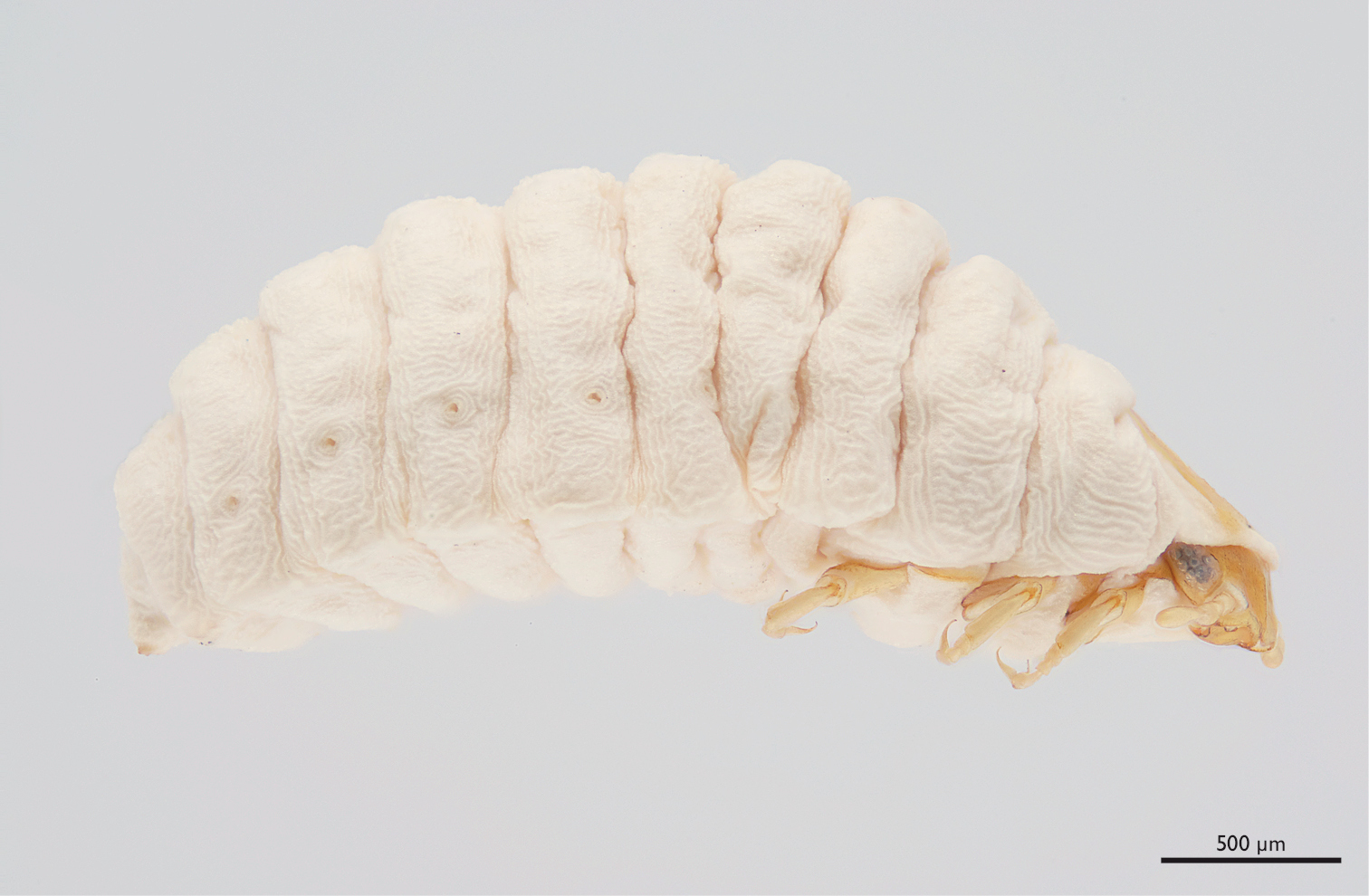
Free living female of Mengenilla moldrzyki (Mengenillidae)

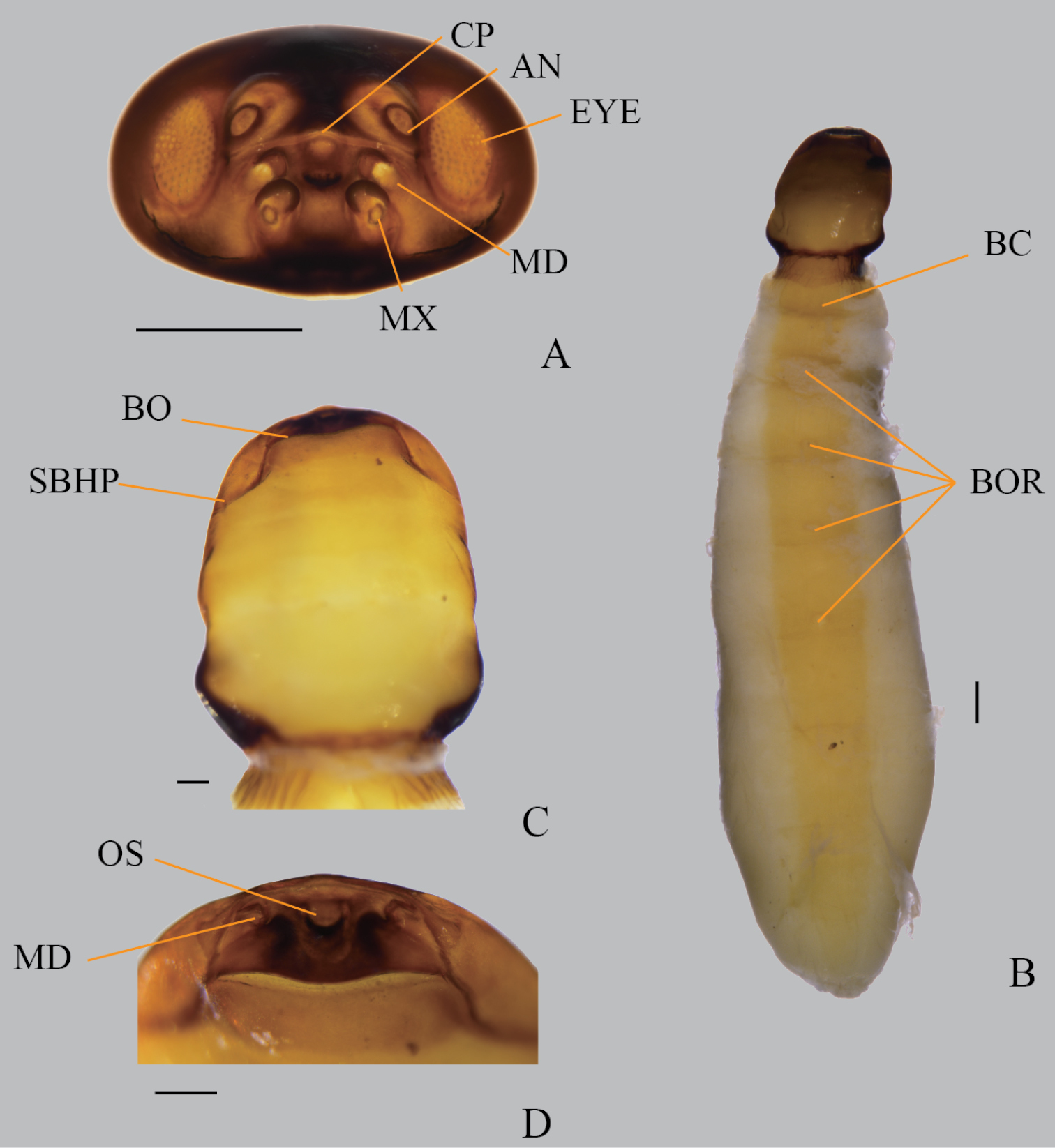
Male pupa head (top left) and adult female of Xenos yangi (Stylopidia, Xenidae) in ventral view (right) and closeup of the cephalothorax (centre and bottom left)

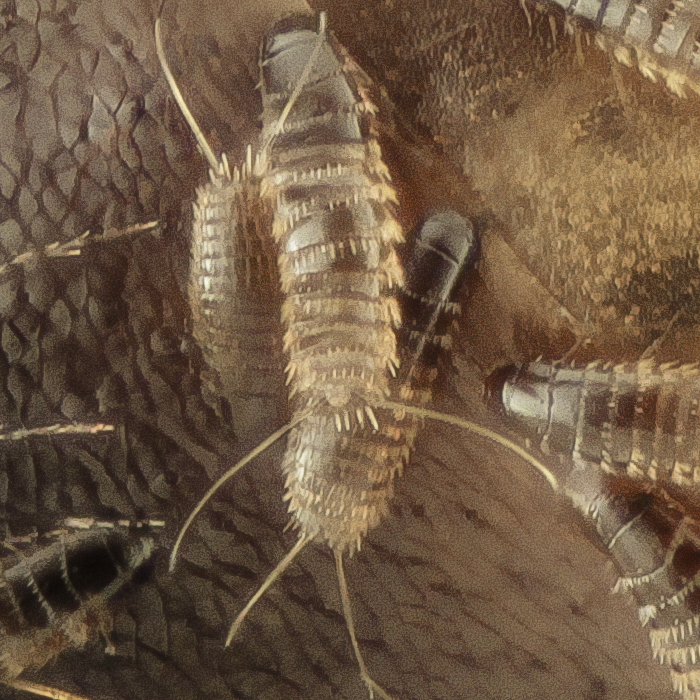
Recently hatched larvae of a stylopid strepsipteran on the bee Andrena nivalis

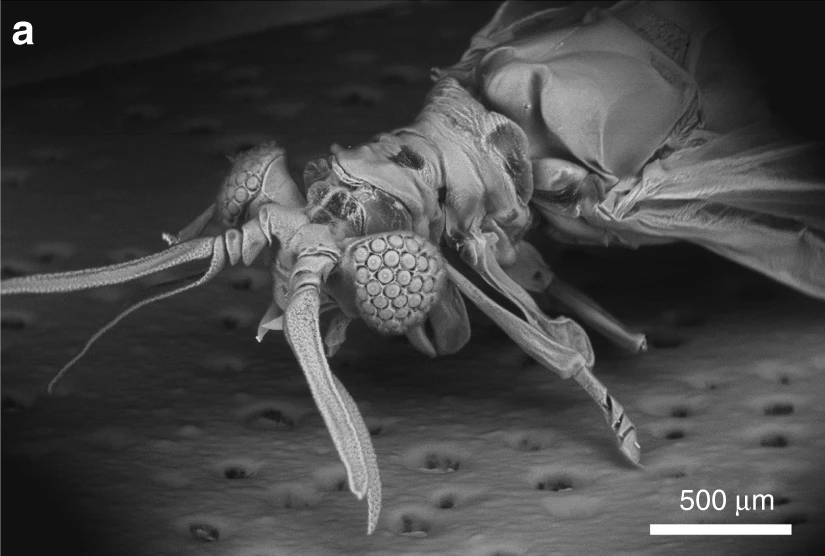
Closeup of the head of male Xenos peckii

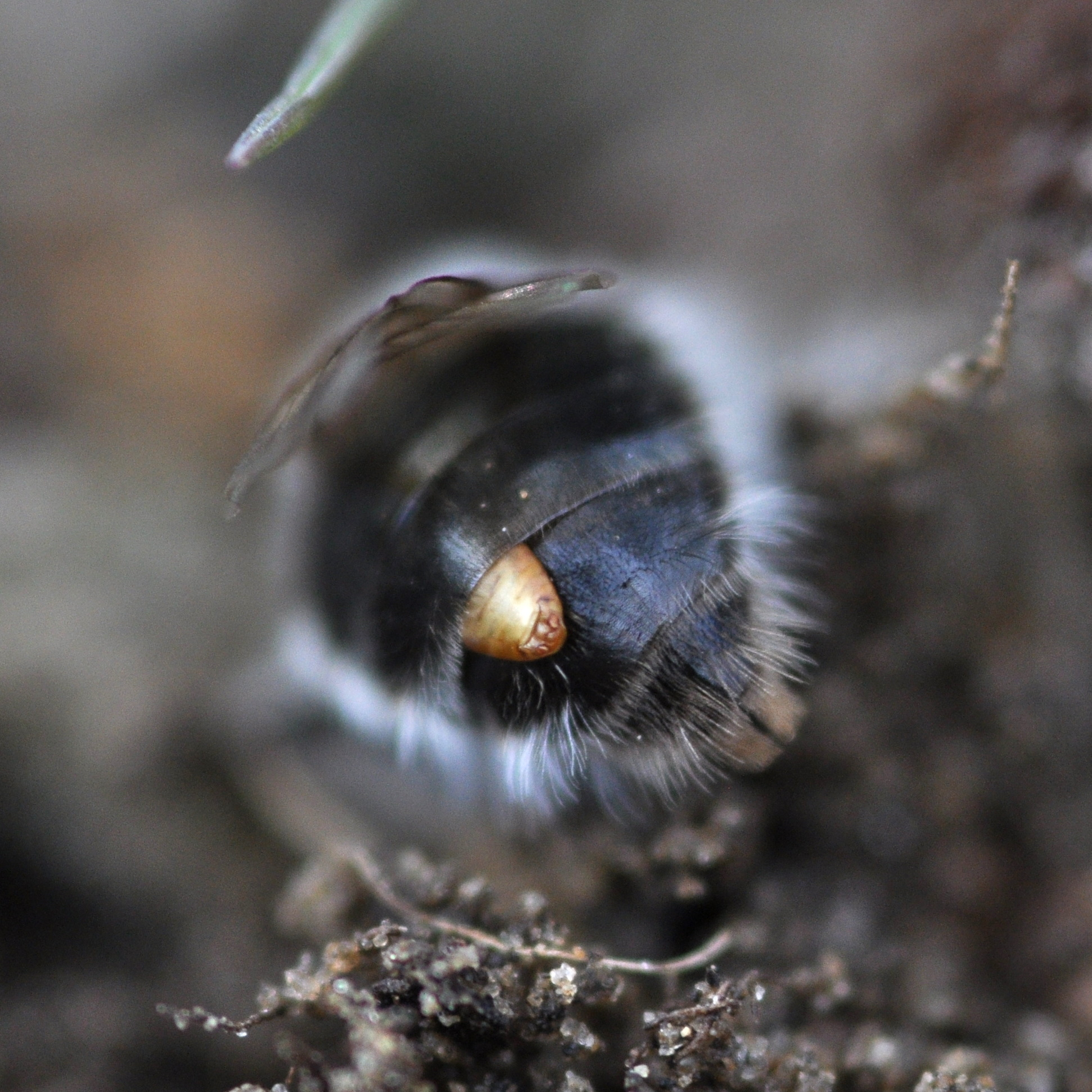
Stylops melittae (Stylopidae) female stylopizing bee Andrena vaga, exposing its cephalothorax

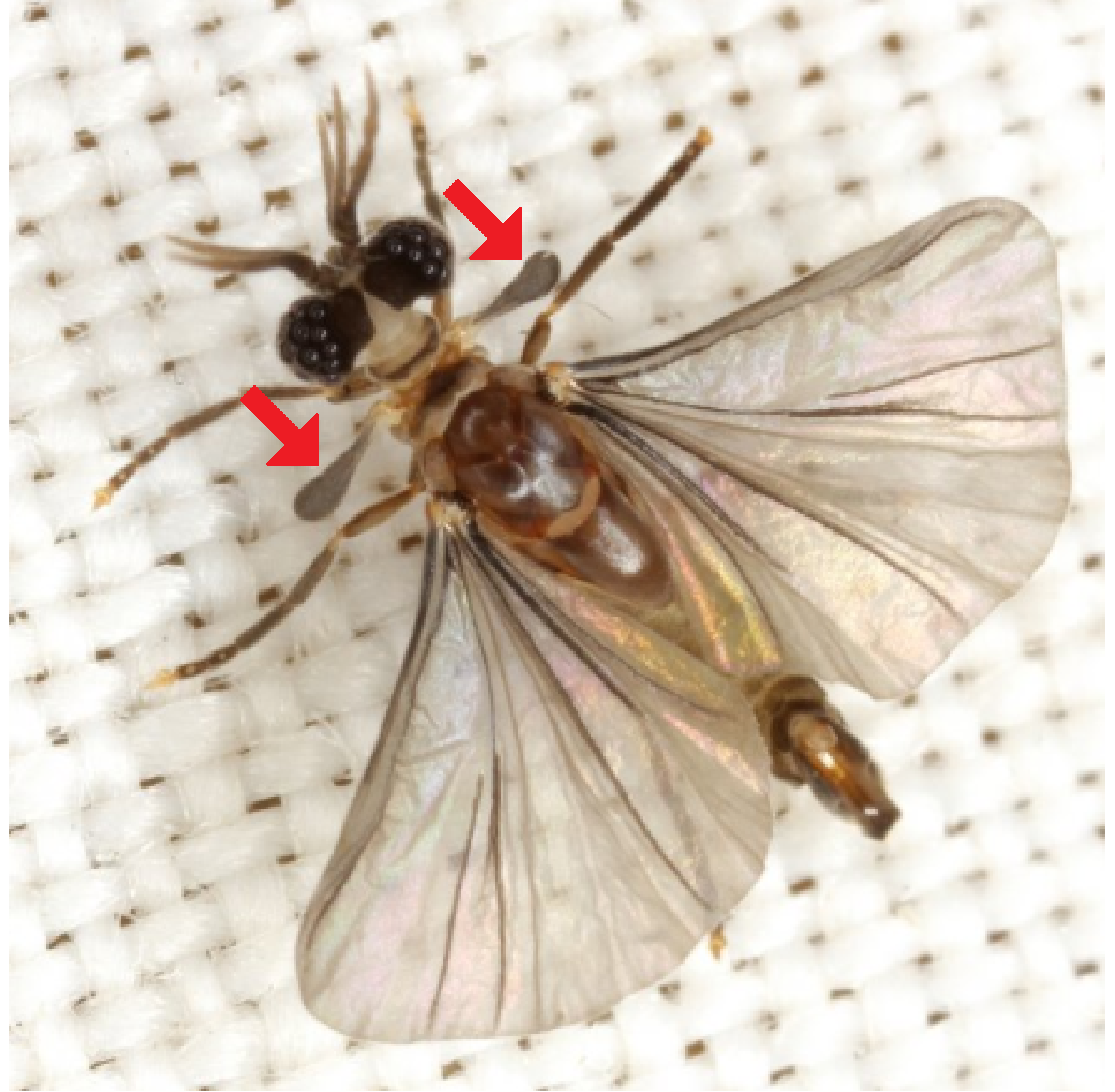
Adult male strepsipteran in dorsal view, halteres highlighted with red arrows

=== Life cycle ===
Traumatic insemination of an endoparasitic female in Stylops ovinae

Virgin females release a pheromone which the males use to locate them. Mating in at least some species is polyandrous, where the female mates with more than one male.

In the Stylopidia, the female's anterior region protrudes out between the segments of the host's abdomen. In all strepsipterans the male mates by rupturing the female's cuticle (in the case of Stylopidia, this is in a deep narrow fissure of the cephalothorax near the birth canal). Sperm passes through the opening directly into the body in a process called traumatic insemination, which has independently evolved in some other insects like bed bugs.

As the female genital apparatus is extremely reduced, missing traits like ovaries and a genital chamber, the eggs are floating freely in the hemolymph, where they hatch into larvae. The planidium larvae can move around freely within the female's haemocoel; this behavior is unique to these insects. The offspring consume their mother from the inside in a process known as haemocoelous viviparity. Each female produces many thousands of planidium larvae. The larvae emerge from the brood opening/canal on the female's head, which protrudes outside the host body.

Larvae have legs and actively seek out new hosts. Their legs are partly vestigial in that they lack a trochanter, the leg segment that forms the articulation between the basal coxa and the femur. The larvae are very active as they only have a limited amount of time to find a host before they exhaust their energy reserves. These first-instar larvae have stemmata (simple, single-lens eyes). When the larvae latch onto a host, they enter it by secreting enzymes that soften the cuticle, usually in the abdominal region of the host. Some species have been reported to enter the eggs of hosts. Larvae of Stichotrema dallatorreanum Hofeneder from Papua New Guinea were found to enter their orthopteran host's tarsus (foot).

Once inside the host, they undergo hypermetamorphosis and transform into a less-mobile, legless larval form. They induce the host to produce a bag-like structure inside which they feed and grow. This structure, made from host tissue, protects them from the immune defences of the host. Larvae go through four more instars, and in each moult the older cuticle separates but is not discarded ("apolysis without ecdysis"), so multiple layers form around the larvae. Male larvae pupate after the last moult, but females directly become neotenous adults. The colour and shape of the host's abdomen may be changed and the host usually becomes sterile. The parasites then undergo pupation to become adults. Adult males emerge from the host bodies, while females stay inside. Females may occupy up to 90% of the abdominal volume of their hosts. Adult males are very short-lived, usually surviving less than five hours, and do not feed.

=== Parasitism ===
Strepsiptera are obligate endoparasites of insects. They have been documented to attack hosts of 36 families within seven insect orders, including members of the orders Zygentoma (silverfish and allies), Orthoptera (grasshoppers, crickets), Blattodea (cockroaches), Mantodea (praying mantis), Heteroptera (bugs), Hymenoptera (wasps, ants and bees), and Diptera (flies). In the strepsipteran family Myrmecolacidae, the males parasitize ants, whereas the females parasitize Orthoptera. Members of Mengenillidae target Zygentoma exclusively, whereas Stylopidia targets only winged insects, with a large number of stylopidians targeting wasps and bees, whereas the largest family of strepsipterans, the Stylopidae, with over 27% of all described strepsipterans, targets bees exclusively.

Very rarely, multiple females may live within a single stylopized host; multiple males within a single host are somewhat more common.

Strepsiptera can influence their host's behaviour. Strepsiptera of the family Myrmecolacidae cause their ant hosts to linger on the tips of grass leaves, increasing the chance of being found by strepsipteran males (in the case of females) and putting them in a good position for male emergence (in the case of males). Parasitized social wasps tend to abandon their nest and to form aberrant aggregations; parasitized solitary bees tend to emerge earlier from their nests.

The species Xenos vesparum can castrate and impede reproductions of their host.

== Taxonomy ==
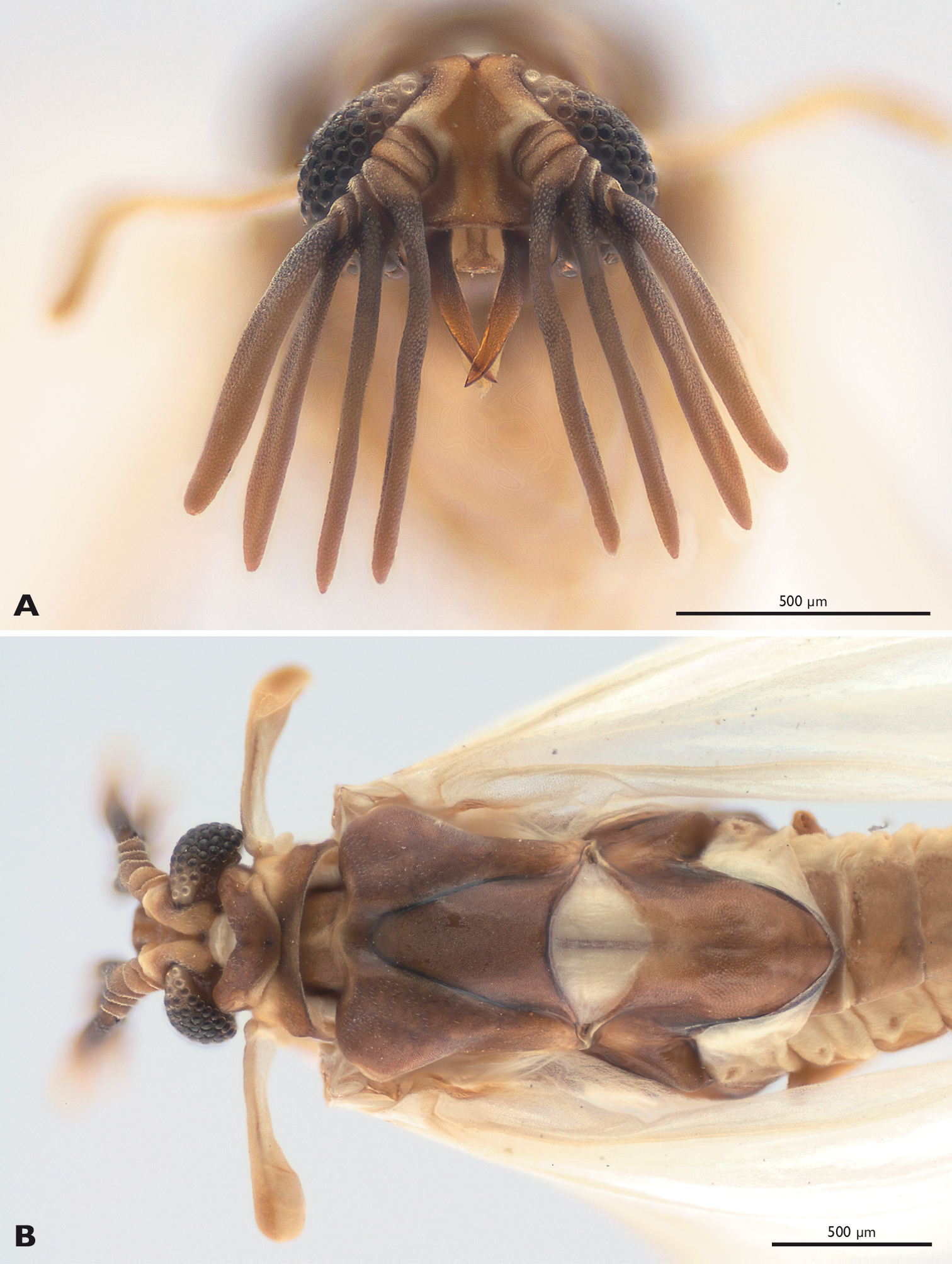
Mengenilla moldrzyki (Mengenilidae)

The order, named by William Kirby in 1813, is named for the hindwings, which are held at a twisted angle when at rest (from Ancient Greek στρέψις (strépsis), meaning "turning around", and πτερόν (pterón), meaning "wing"), wing). The forewings are reduced to halteres.

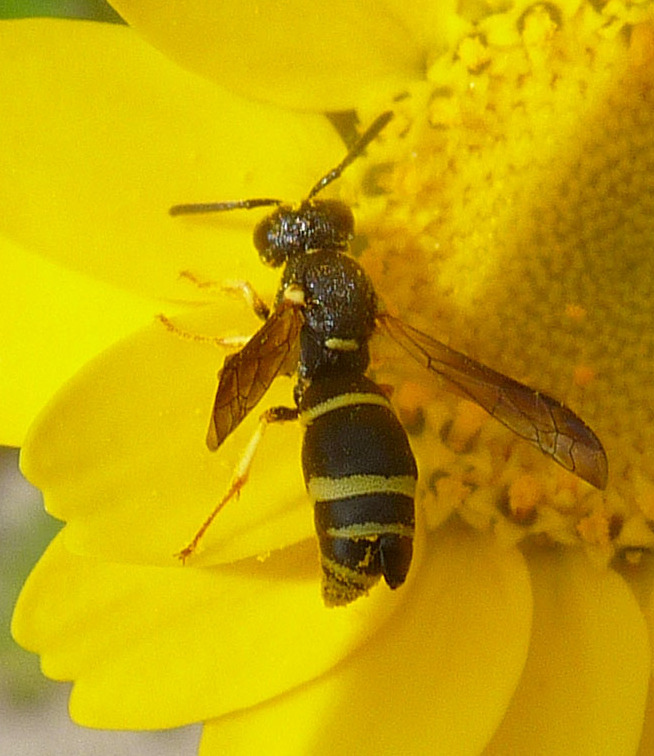
A wasp (Odynerus spinipes) with a small portion of a strepsipteran's body protruding from its abdomen

Strepsiptera were once believed to be the sister group to the beetle families Meloidae and Ripiphoridae, which have similar parasitic development and forewing reduction. Early molecular research suggested their inclusion as a sister group to the flies, in a clade called Halteria, which have one pair of the wings modified into halteres, and failed to support their relationship to the beetles. Further molecular studies, however, suggested they are outside the clade Mecopterida (containing the Diptera and Lepidoptera), but found no strong evidence for affinity with any other extant group. Study of their evolutionary position has been problematic due to difficulties in phylogenetic analysis arising from long branch attraction. Most modern molecular studies, including whole genome sequencing, find strepsipterans as the sister group of beetles (Coleoptera), with both groups together forming the clade Coleopterida. The most basal strepsipteran is the fossil Protoxenos janzeni discovered in Eocene aged Baltic amber, whereas the most basal living strepsipteran is Bahiaxenos relictus, the sole member of the family Bahiaxenidae. The earliest known strepsipteran fossils are those of Cretostylops engeli (Cretostylopdiae) and Kinzelbachilla ellenbergeri, Phthanoxenos nervosus and Heterobathmilla kakopoios (Phthanoxenidae), discovered in middle Cretaceous Burmese amber from Myanmar, around 99 million years old, which all lie outside the crown group, but are all more closely related to modern strepsiperans than Protoxenos is. The finding of a parasitic first instar in the same deposit indicates that the parasitic lifestyle of the group has likely existed nearly unchanged for 100 million years, though their evolutionary history prior to this remains a mystery. The idea that mengellinids' targeting of zygentomans represents the ancestral ecology of the group as a whole has been considered questionable.

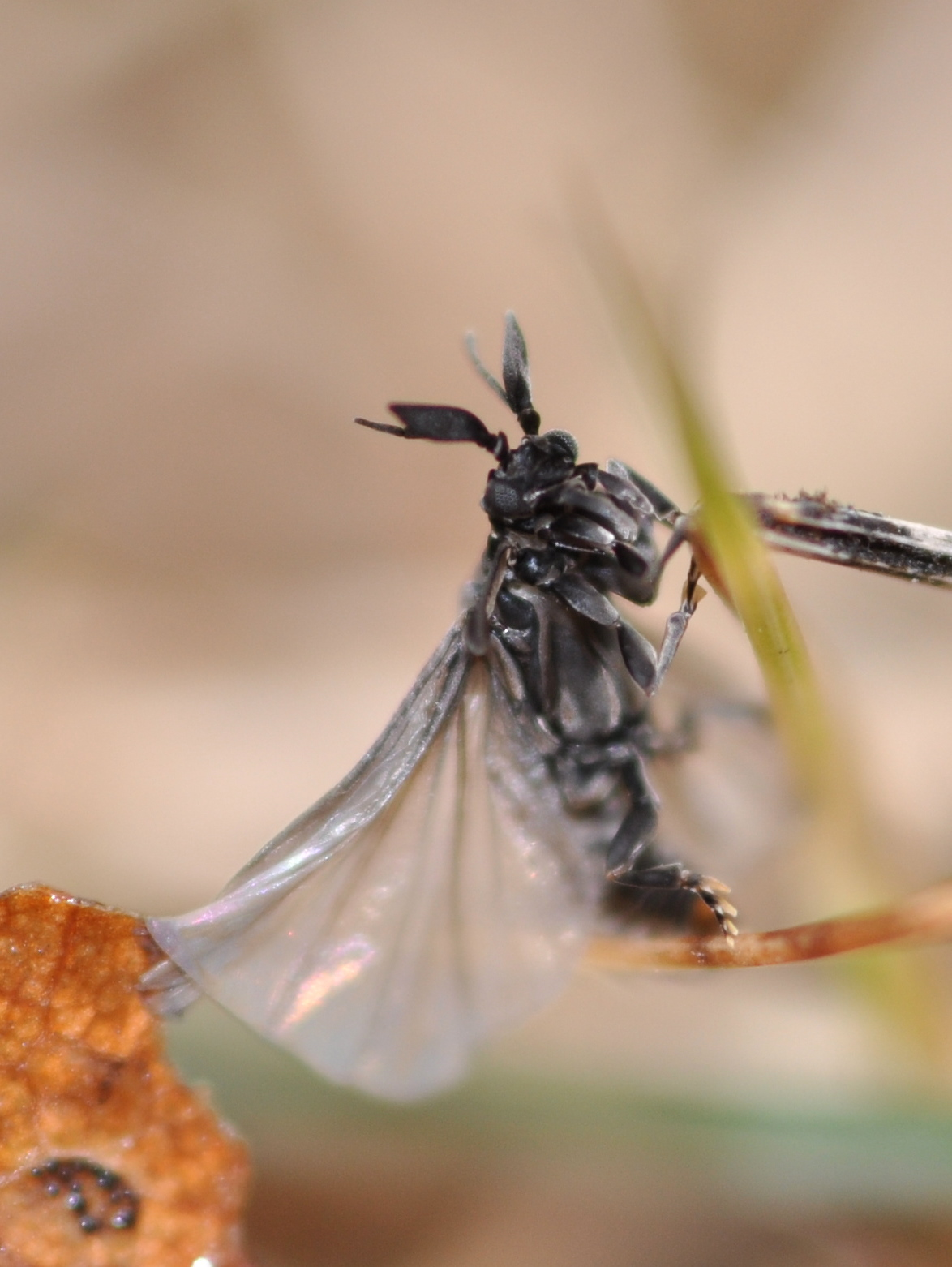
Stylops melittae male

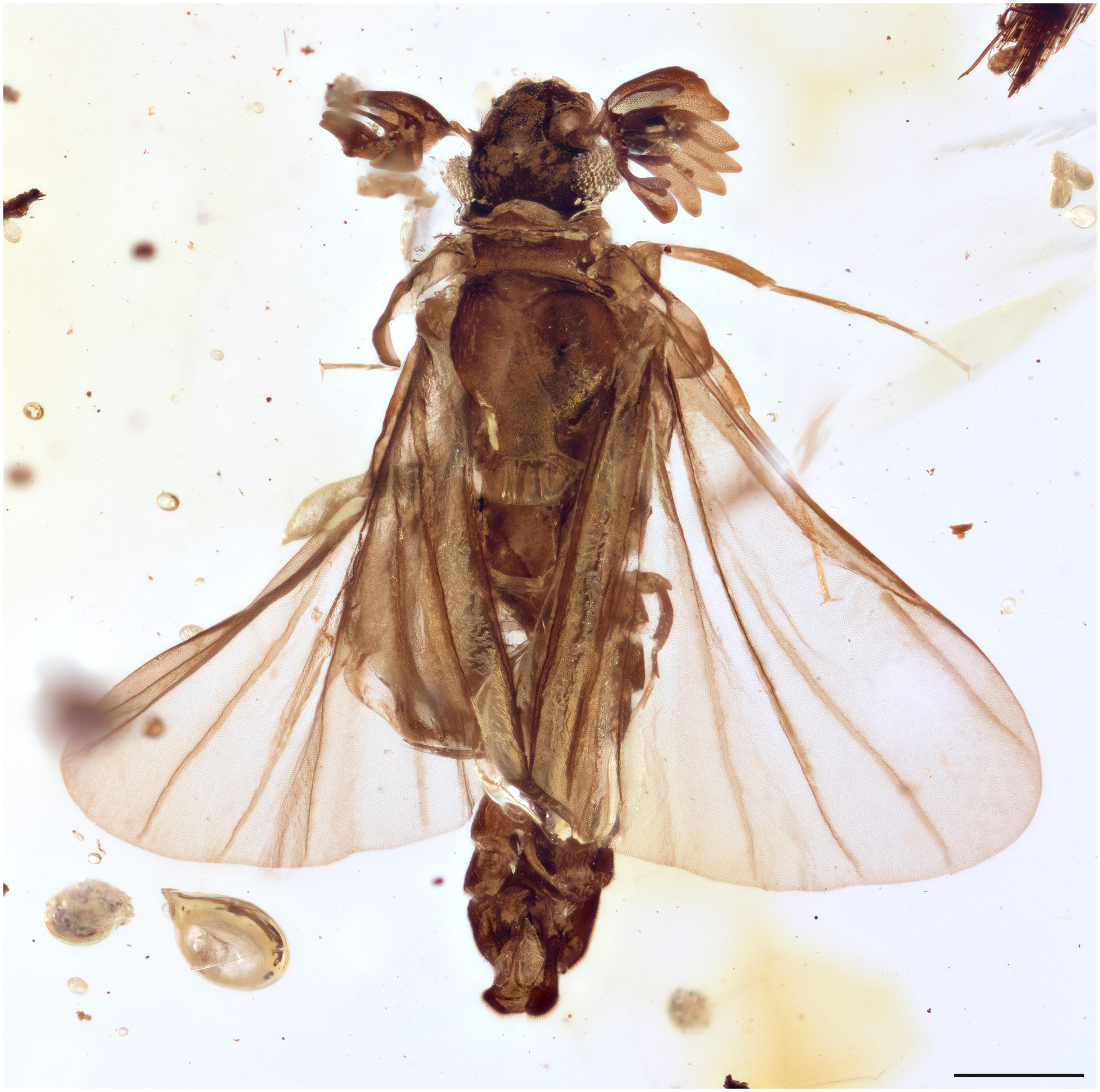
Stem-group strepsipteran Heterobathmilla kakopoios (†Phthanoxenidae) in Burmese amber, around 100 million years old

=== Families ===
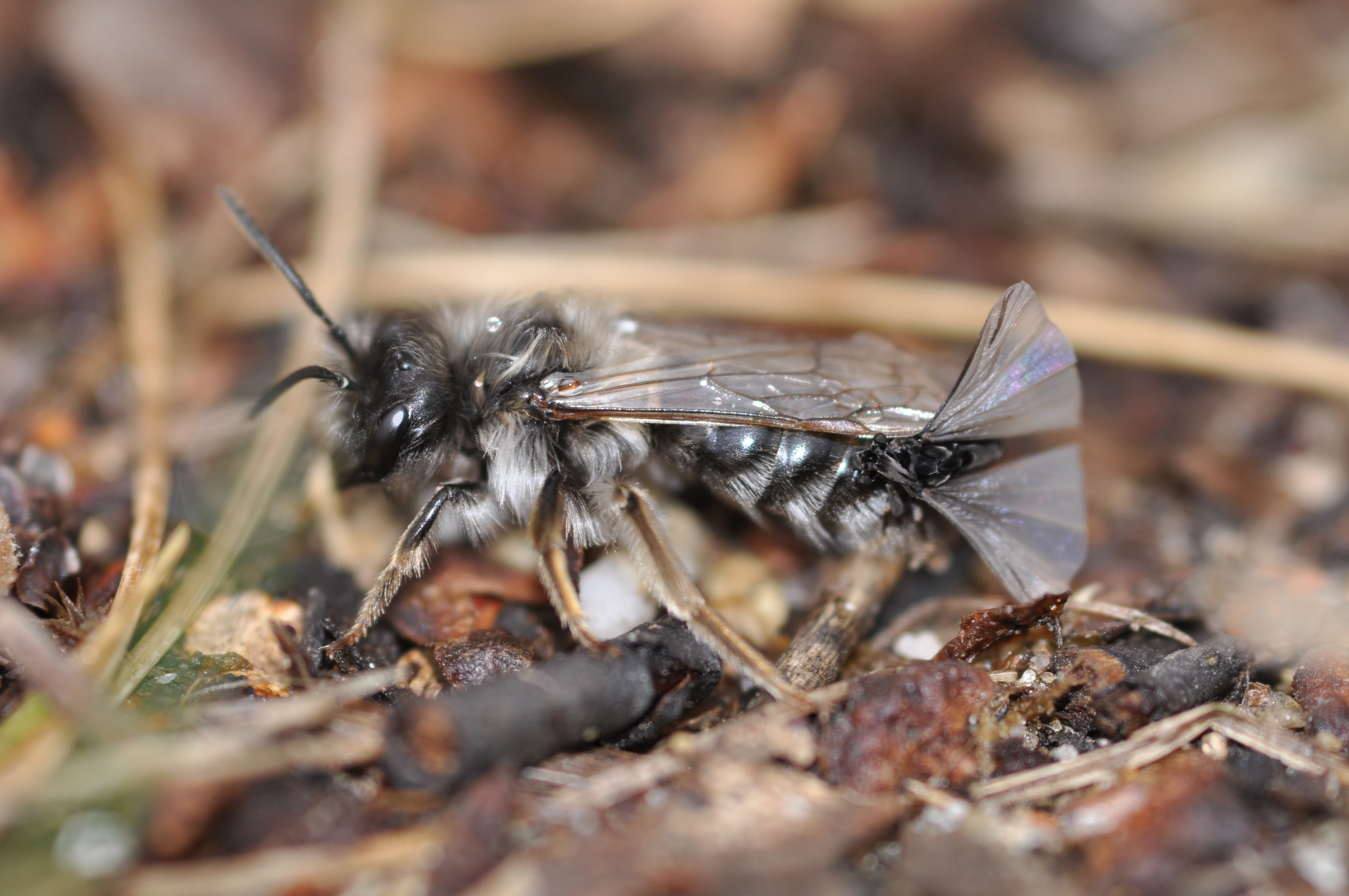
Andrena vaga male bee, with Stylops melittae mating on its abdomen

The vast majority of living strepsipterans are placed within the grouping Stylopidia, which includes the families Corioxenidae, Halictophagidae, Callipharixenidae, Bohartillidae, Elenchidae, Myrmecolacidae, Stylopidae, Protelencholacidae (extinct) and Xenidae. All Stylopidia have endoparasitic females that have multiple genital openings. Two living families, Mengenillidae and Bahiaxenidae, are placed outside of this group, along with several extinct families.

The Stylopidae have four-segmented tarsi and four- to six-segmented antennae, with the third segment having a lateral process. The family Stylopidae may be paraphyletic. The Elenchidae have two-segmented tarsi and four-segmented antennae, with the third segment having a lateral process. The Halictophagidae have three-segmented tarsi and seven-segmented antennae, with lateral processes from the third and fourth segments. The Stylopidae mostly parasitize wasps and bees, the Elenchidae are known to parasitize Fulgoroidea, whereas the Halictophagidae are found on leafhoppers, treehoppers, and mole cricket hosts.

Strepsipteran insects in the genus Xenos parasitize Polistes carnifex, a species of social wasps. These obligate parasites infect the developing wasp larvae in the nest and are present within the abdomens of female wasps when they hatch out. Here they remain until they thrust through the cuticle and pupate (males) or release infective first-instar larvae onto flowers (females). These larvae are transported back to their nests by foraging wasps.

=== Cladogram ===
After Pohl et al. (2020):

- Strepsiptera
  - †Protoxenidae
  - - †Cretostylopidae
    - †Phthanoxenidae
    - - †Mengeidae
      - Bahiaxenidae
      - - Mengenillidae
        - Stylopidia
          - Corioxenidae
          - Stylopiformia
            - Bohartillidae
            - - Halictophagidae
              - - Elenchidae
                - - †Protelencholacidae
                  - - Myrmecolacidae
                    - - Callipharixenidae
                      - - Xenidae
                        - Stylopidae

== Genetics ==
The first strepsipteran species to have been sequenced in full is Mengenilla moldrzyki. The genome sequence is 168 Mb long, with 30,068 inferred protein-coding genes, with over 13,000 being supported by external evidence. Strepsipteran genomes tend to be unusually small. The evolution of strepsipteran sex chromosomes shows that part of them are ancestral to the split between Coleoptera and Strepsiptera.

== Relationship with humans ==
Some insects which have been considered pests may have strepsipteran endoparasites. Inoculation of a pest population with the corresponding parasitoid may sometimes aid in reducing the impact of such pests, although no strepsipterans have ever been tested for use in this capacity, let alone being available for such purposes, either commercially or experimentally.

== See also ==
- Entomophagous parasite
