= Syndrome X =

Syndrome X may refer to:

- Groups of symptoms, so called as placeholder name, when newly discovered:
  - Cardiac syndrome X
  - Metabolic syndrome
  - Neotenic complex syndrome, such as identified in Brooke Greenberg
  - Acute radiation syndrome, upon its recognition in 1945

== See also ==
- Single X, chromosomal disorder AKA Turner syndrome
