= Odaxelagnia =

Sexual arousal from biting or being bitten

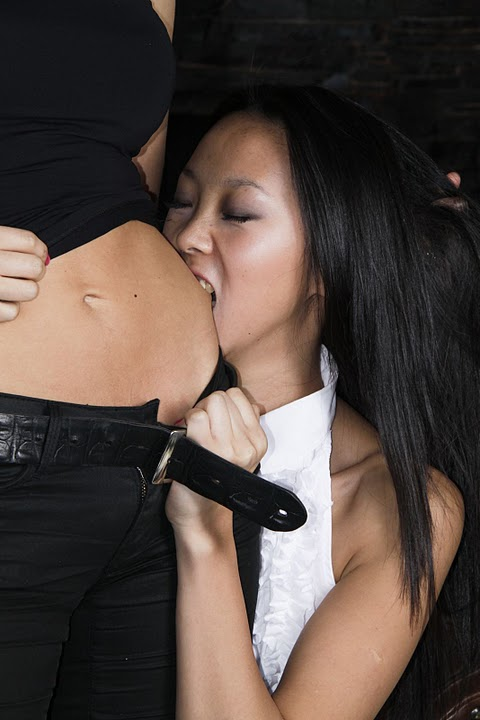
A woman biting another woman's belly

Odaxelagnia (from Greek: ὀδάξ, odáx, "with the teeth" and Greek: λαγνεία, lagneía, "lust") is a paraphilia involving sexual arousal through biting, or being bitten.

Odaxelagnia is considered a mild form of sadomasochism. The bites can be more or less intense and occur in various parts of the body, e.g., on the arms, shoulders, hands, and occasionally on the genitals. Odaxelagnia is sometimes associated with sexual vampirism, but most forms of sexual biting do not involve bloodshed. Alfred Kinsey studied odaxelagnia, reporting that roughly half of all people surveyed had experienced sexual arousal from biting.

== History ==
The Kama Sutra lists eight different forms of sexual biting, varying in method or the type of mark left. These eight types are "hidden bites" (no mark), "swollen bites" (when the skin taken in the mouth and pressed on both sides), "point" and "line of points" (only two teeth are used, nibbles), "coral and the jewel" (teeth and lips are used), "line of jewels" (all teeth are used), "broken cloud" (leaves a roughly circular mark), and "biting of the boar" (many wide marks).

Sexual biting is also mentioned in The Perfumed Garden as an important part of foreplay.

Pompey's courtesan, named Flora, said that she enjoyed biting him.

== Research ==
=== Psychology ===
Biting can be an instinctual reaction to pleasure for some people. The desire to bite ones partner during sex may be related to the phenomenon of cuteness aggression.

=== Prevalence ===
The Kinsey reports found that 26% of both men and women had a definite or frequent erotic response to being bitten, with 29% of women and 24% of men sometimes having a response.

In 1987, Charles Allen Moser and Eugene E. Levitt conducted a study that found, in a sample of men interested in sadomasochism, 31.6% had tried and enjoyed biting or being bitten during sex.

A study published in the September 2022 issue of the Journal of Criminal Justice found that, of the respondents, 30.7% often fantasized about biting and 28.3% were often aroused by biting. In this study, odaxelagnia was the second most common paraphillia in both arousal and fantasies.

In 2025, the Archives of Sexual Behavior published an article by Debby Herbenick that details the prevalence of various rough sexual practices. Biting ranked as the most common rough sexual behavior enacted both by women and by transgender or nonbinary people, and the third most common for men. It also ranked as the third most common received behavior by women, the first most common for men, and the second most common for transgender or nonbinary people.

Given bites	Women		Men		TGNB+	
Given bites	Lifetime	Past Year	Lifetime	Past Year	Lifetime	Past Year
Heterosexual	28.7%	15.1%	32.6%	16.9%	-	-
Bisexual or pansexual	63.6%	45.8%	41.9%	25.4%	-	-
Lesbian or gay	47.7%	21.3%	38.2%	19.0%	-	-
Overall	31.2%	17.1%	33.1%	17.3%	62.7%	38.9%

Received bites	Women		Men		TGNB+	
Received bites	Lifetime	Past Year	Lifetime	Past Year	Lifetime	Past Year
Heterosexual	23.7%	13.1%	29.3%	14.5%	-	-
Bisexual or pansexual	63.5%	42.4%	43.8%	25.8%	-	-
Gay or lesbian	38.0%	18.0%	32.9%	18.7%	-	-
Overall	26.6%	15.3%	29.8%	15.0%	58.7%	29.8%

== Other animals ==
Some animals, such as felines (including domestic cats, big cats, and Savannah cats) equines, and turtles, engage in gentle biting during sex in order to induce ovulation/ejaculation or to keep their partner still. Certain non-human simians also engage in sexual biting, including baboons, chimpanzees and some monkeys. Members of the Mustelidae family (minks, ferrets, martens, and skunks) will bite their mate hard enough to break the skin.

== See also ==
- Love bite
- Vampirism
- Vorarephilia
