= Unazukin =

Brand of toys manufactured by Bandai

Unazukin (うなずきん) are a brand of toys designed by Bandai. According to the official Bandai webpage, the toy is no longer in production. They were developed by Prof. Tomio Watanabe of Okayama Prefectural University as part of studying cuteness.

== Product Description ==
A Unazukin looks like a small "angel" averaging 5 cm (2 inches) high. They are reminiscent of a nesting Matryoshka doll, and have a retro/popart style decoration. Some models are voice activated and react to voice, nodding and shaking their head. Battery powered with an on/off switch, they have four different movements, shaking head back and forth once or twice; and nodding once or twice.

== Series ==
- Sakura
- First Version - Clover, Shine, Bird, Flower, Dot, Stripe
- Gift Version - Happy Birthday, Anniversary, How Are You, Congratulations, Thank You
- Nature Version - Moon, Rainbow, Green, Sun, Star
- World Version - Hopi, Fei, Rani, Irene, Hana
- Flower Version - Rose, Dandelion, Violet, Cherry Blossoms, Poppy, Hydrangea
- Irodori Version - Kuchinashi, Sango, Tsuyukusa, Fuji, Moegi
- Fruit Version - Grape, Strawberry, Green Apple, Orange, Pear
- Birthstone Version - Garnet, Amethyst, Aquamarine, Diamond, Emerald, Pearl, Ruby, Peridot, Sapphire, Opal, Topaz, Lapis Lazuli
- Anniversary Version - Tuxedo, Gown
- Dressy Version - Wedding Couple, King & Queen
