= Biting =

Closing one's teeth on something

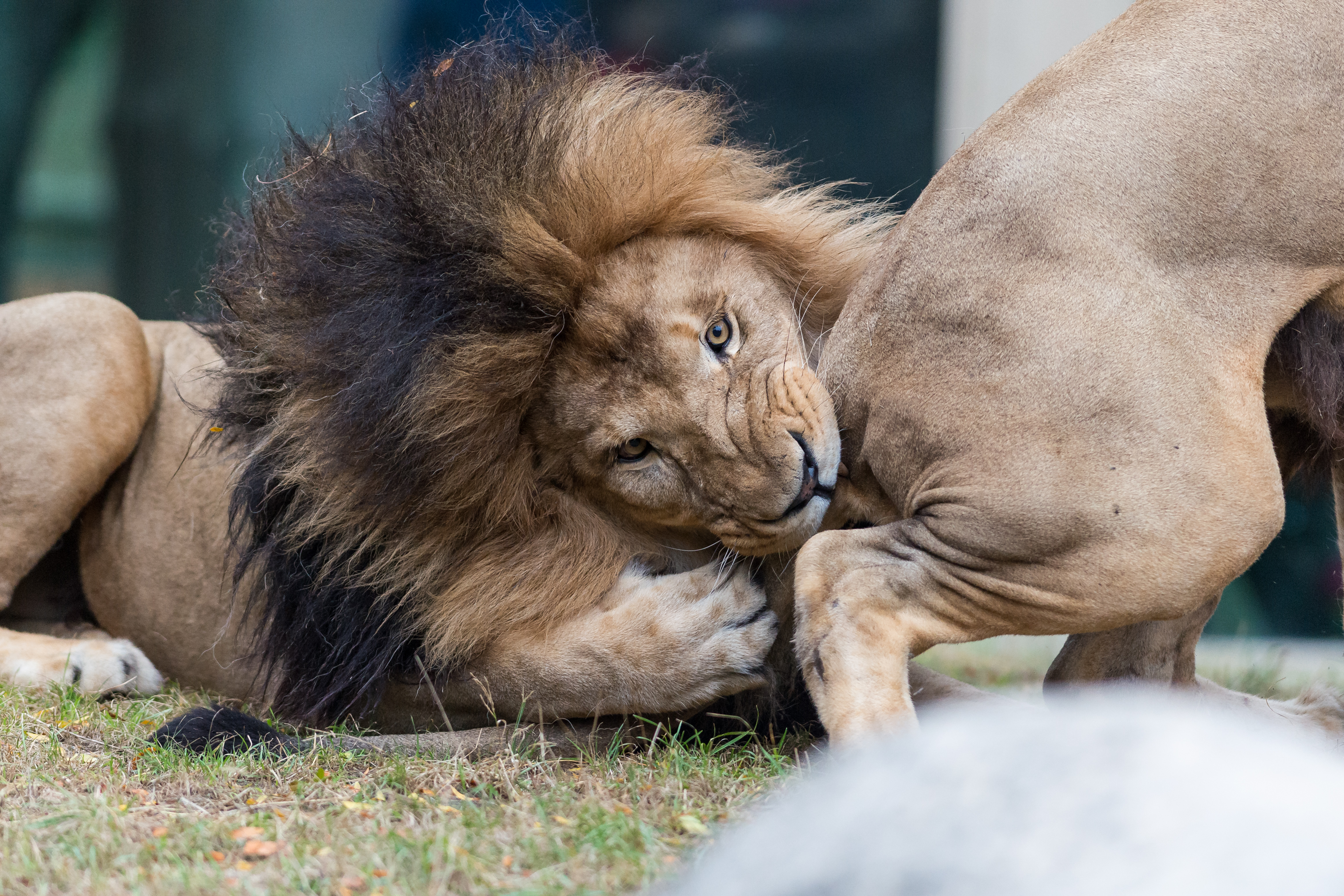
A lion biting another lion's tail as play behavior.

Biting is an action involving a set of teeth closing down on an object. It is a common zoological behavior, being found in toothed animals such as mammals, reptiles, amphibians, fishes, and arthropods. Biting is also an action humans participate in, most commonly when chewing food. Myocytic contraction of the muscles of mastication is responsible for generating the force that initiates the preparatory jaw abduction (opening), then rapidly adducts (closes) the jaw and moves the top and bottom teeth towards each other, resulting in the forceful action of a bite. Biting is one of the main functions in the lives of larger organisms, providing them the ability to forage, hunt, eat, build, play, fight, protect, and much more. Biting may be a form of physical aggression due to predatory or territorial intentions. In animals, biting can also be a normal activity, being used for eating, scratching, carrying objects, preparing food for young, removing ectoparasites or irritating foreign objects, and social grooming. Humans can have the tendency to bite each other whether they are children or adults.

Bites often result in serious puncture wounds, avulsion injuries, fractures, hemorrhages, infections, envenomation, and death. In modern human societies, dog bites are the most common type of bite, with children being the most common victims and faces being the most common target. Some other species that may bite humans include urban animals such as feral cats, spiders, and snakes. Other common bites to humans are inflicted by hematophagous insects and arthropods, such as mosquitoes, fleas, lice, bedbugs, and ticks (whose "bites" are actually a form of stinging rather than true biting).

== Types of teeth ==
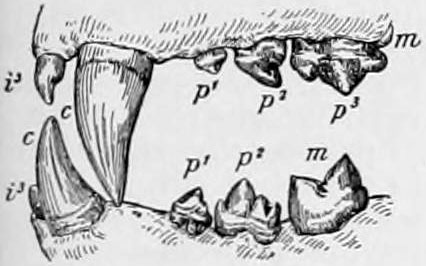
Teeth of a lion, showcasing the front canines, middle carnassials, and back molars

The types of teeth that organisms use to bite vary throughout the animal kingdom. Different types of teeth are seen in herbivores, carnivores, and omnivores as they are adapted over many years to better fit their diets. Carnivores possess canine, carnassial, and molar teeth, while herbivores are equipped with incisor teeth and wide-back molars. In general, tooth shape has traditionally been used to predict dieting habits. Carnivores have long, extremely sharp teeth for both gripping prey and cutting meat into chunks. They lack flat chewing teeth because they swallow food in chunks. An example of this is shown by the broad, serrated teeth of great white sharks which prey on large marine animals. On the other hand, herbivores have rows of wide, flat teeth to bite and chew grass and other plants. Cows spend up to eleven hours a day biting off grass and grinding it with their molars. Omnivores consume both meat and plants, so they possess a mixture of flat teeth and sharp teeth.

== Carrying mechanism ==
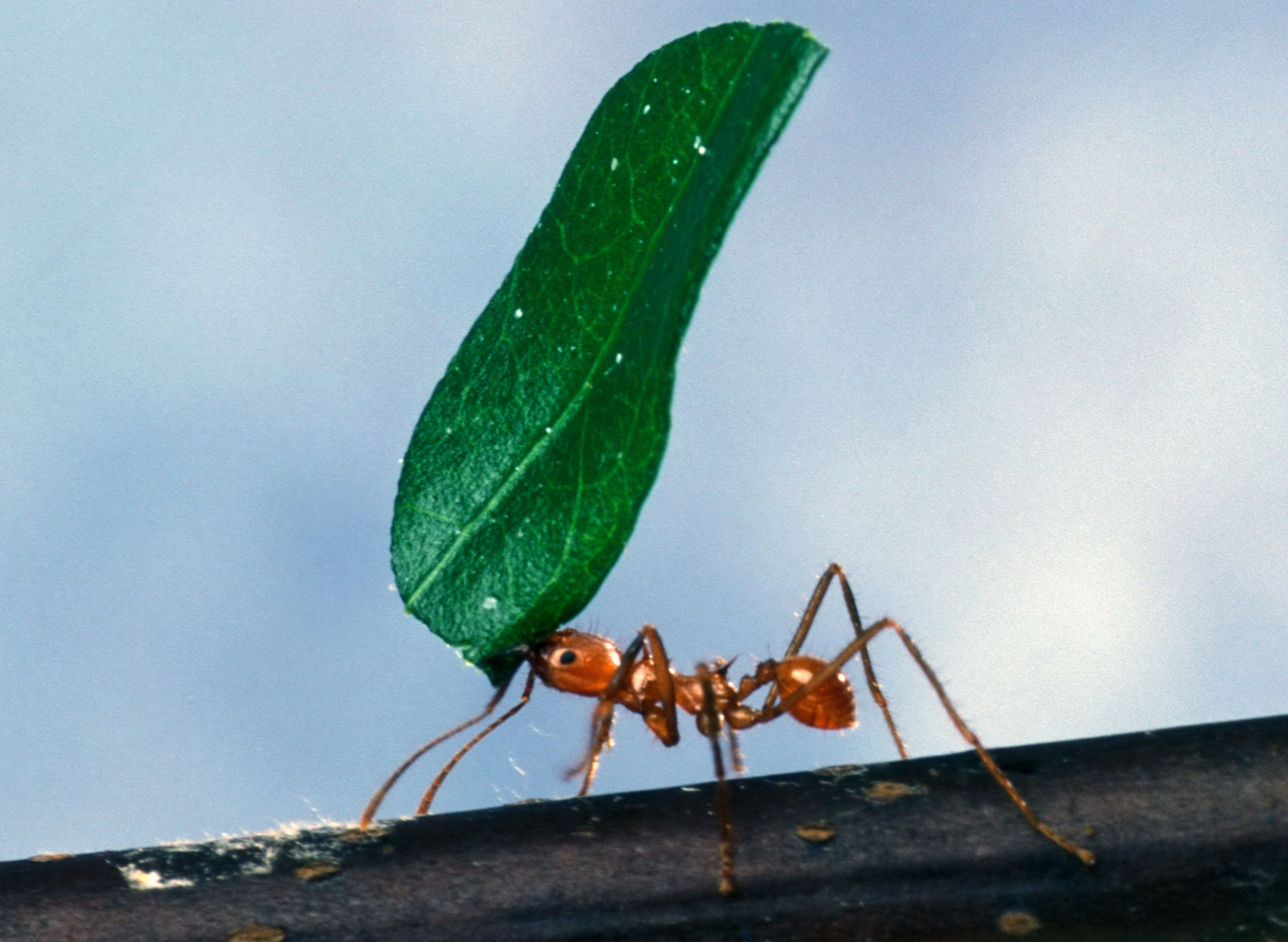
An ant carrying a leaf by biting it.

Biting can serve as a carrying mechanism for species such as beavers and ants, the raw power of their species-specific teeth allowing them to carry large objects. Beavers have a large tooth adapted for gnawing wood. Their jaw muscles are tuned to power through big trees and carry them back to their dam. Ants use their powerful jaws to lift material back to the colony. They can carry several thousand times their weight due to their bite and are adapted to use this to forage for their colonies. Fire ants use their strong bite to get a grip on prey, then inject a toxin via their stinger and carry the prey back to their territory.

== Dangers ==
Some organisms have dangerous bites that inject venom. Many snakes carry a venomous saliva containing at least one of the major groups of toxins, which include cytotoxins, hemotoxins, myotoxins, and neurotoxins. Spider venom polypeptides target specific ion channels, which excites components of the peripheral, central and autonomic nervous systems, causing hyperactive neurotransmitter release and subsequently refractory paralysis. Spider bites, or arachnidism, are mainly a form of predation, but also means of self-defense — when trapped or accidentally tampered with by humans, spiders retaliate by biting. The recluse spider and widow species have neurotoxins and necrotizing agents that paralyze and digest prey.

Humans biting each other can cause a number of diseases with streptococci, staphylococci, and anaerobic organisms being very severe causing infections. These bites are typically deep cutting into the skin where the infection forms.

There are several creatures with non-lethal bites that may cause discomfort or diseases. Mosquito bites may cause allergic wheals that are itchy and may last a few days; in some areas, they can spread blood-borne diseases (e.g. malaria and West Nile fever) via transmission of protozoic or viral pathogens. Similarly, tick bites spread diseases endemic to their location, most famously Lyme disease, but ticks also serve as disease vectors for Colorado tick fever, African tick bite fever, Tick-borne encephalitis, etc.

== In humans ==
Humans may bite out of play or aggression. Bites that occur from adults fighting are usually on the hands and the skeletal section. Infections are a result of bacteria from the mouth spread to another human. Human bites are the third most common type of bites that require a hospital visit. Biting in children is common, however, it may be prevented by methods including redirection, change in the environment and responding to biting by talking about appropriate ways to express anger and frustration. Children older than 30 months who habitually bite may require professional intervention. Some discussion of human biting appears in The Kinsey Report on Sexual Behavior in the Human Female. Biting may also occur in physical fights or in self-defense.

The sexual arousal through biting is known as odaxelagnia.

Criminally, Forensic Dentistry is involved in bite-mark analysis. Due to bite-marks change significantly over time, investigators must call for an expert as soon as possible. Bites are then analyzed to determine whether the biter was human, self-inflicted or not, and whether DNA was left behind from the biter. All measurements must be extremely precise, as small errors in measurement can lead to large errors in legal judgment.

Here follows an example of a human bite on a right forearm, with its evolution and a view of the teeth:

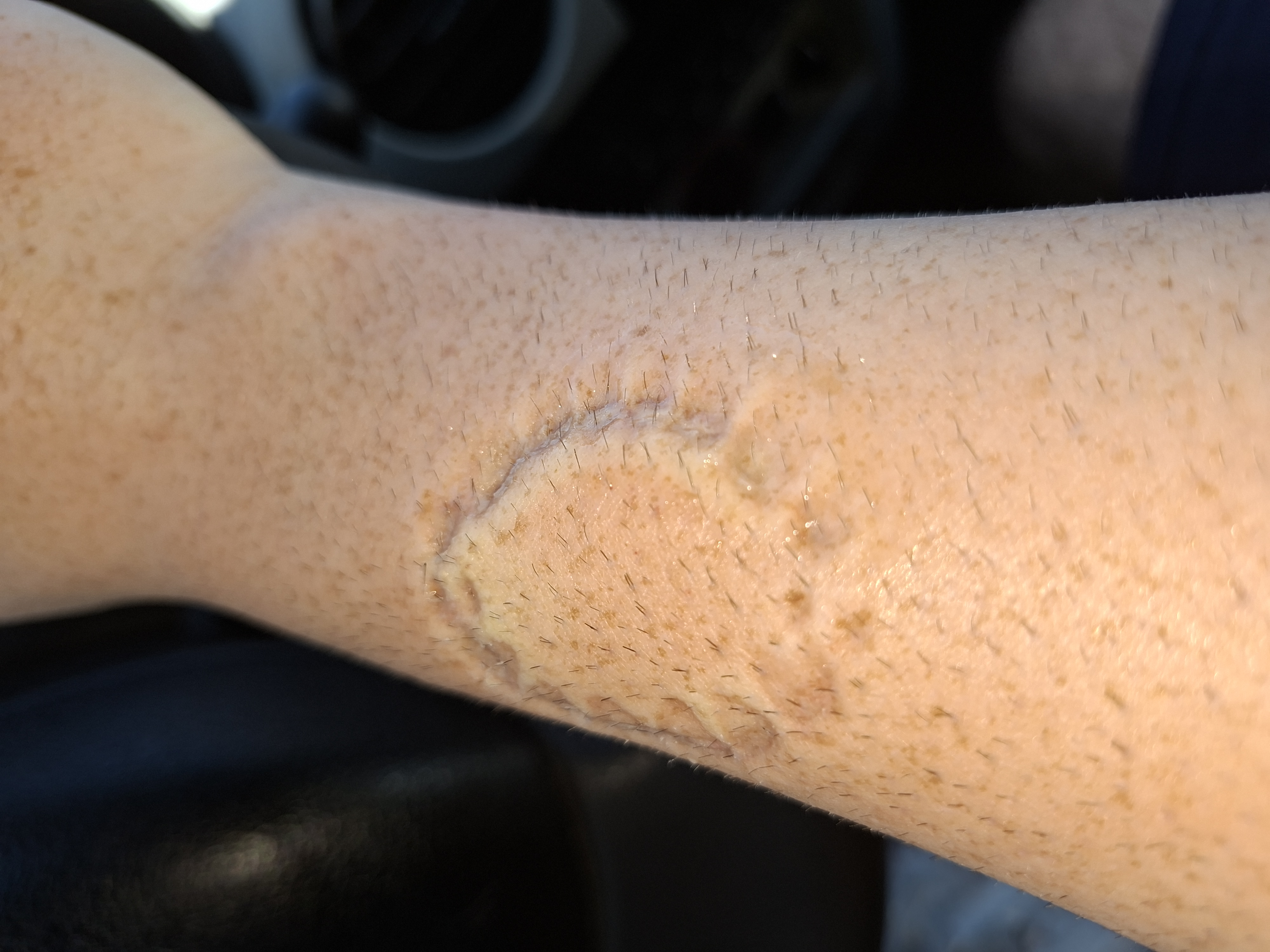
Immediately after

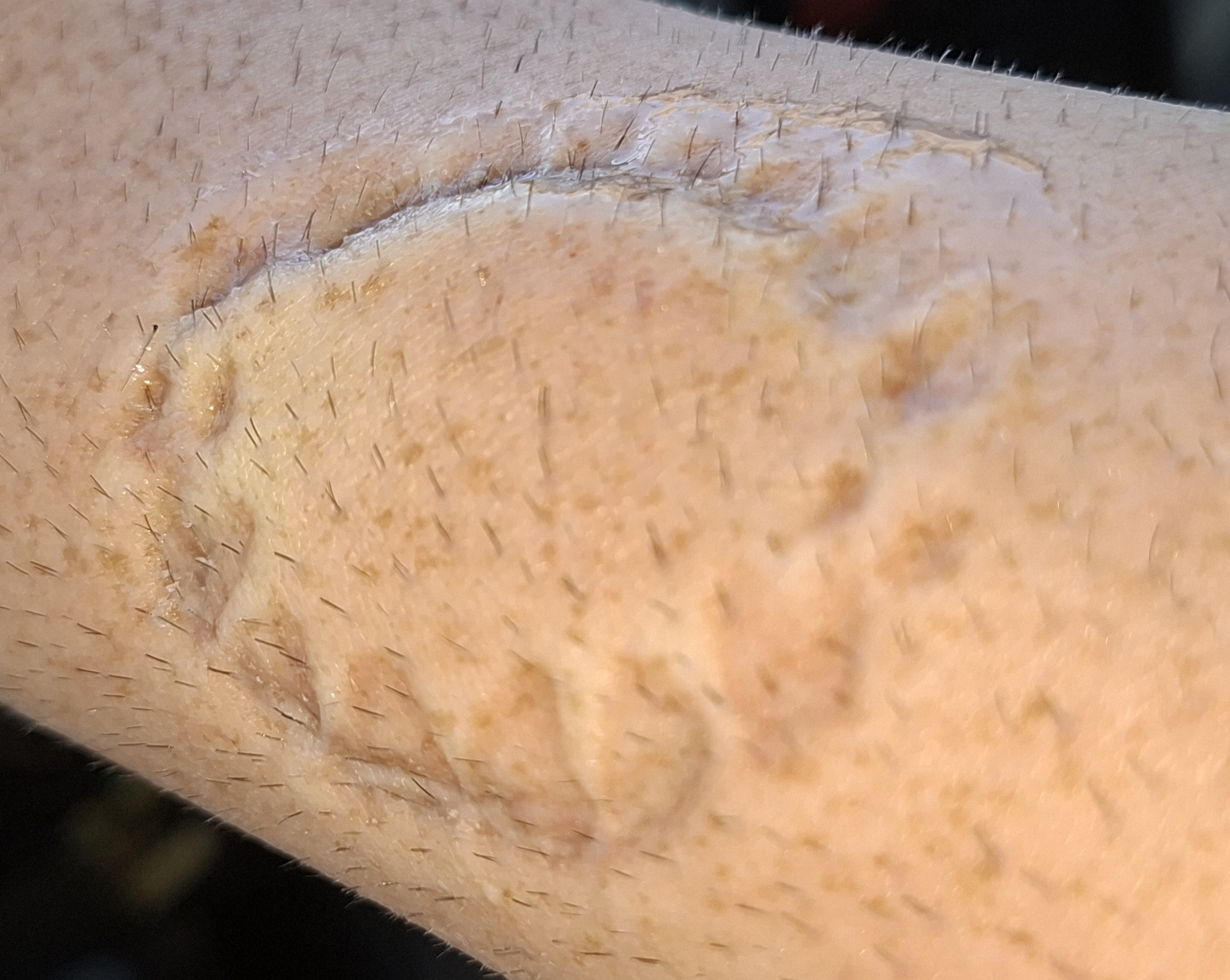
Immediately after, closer look

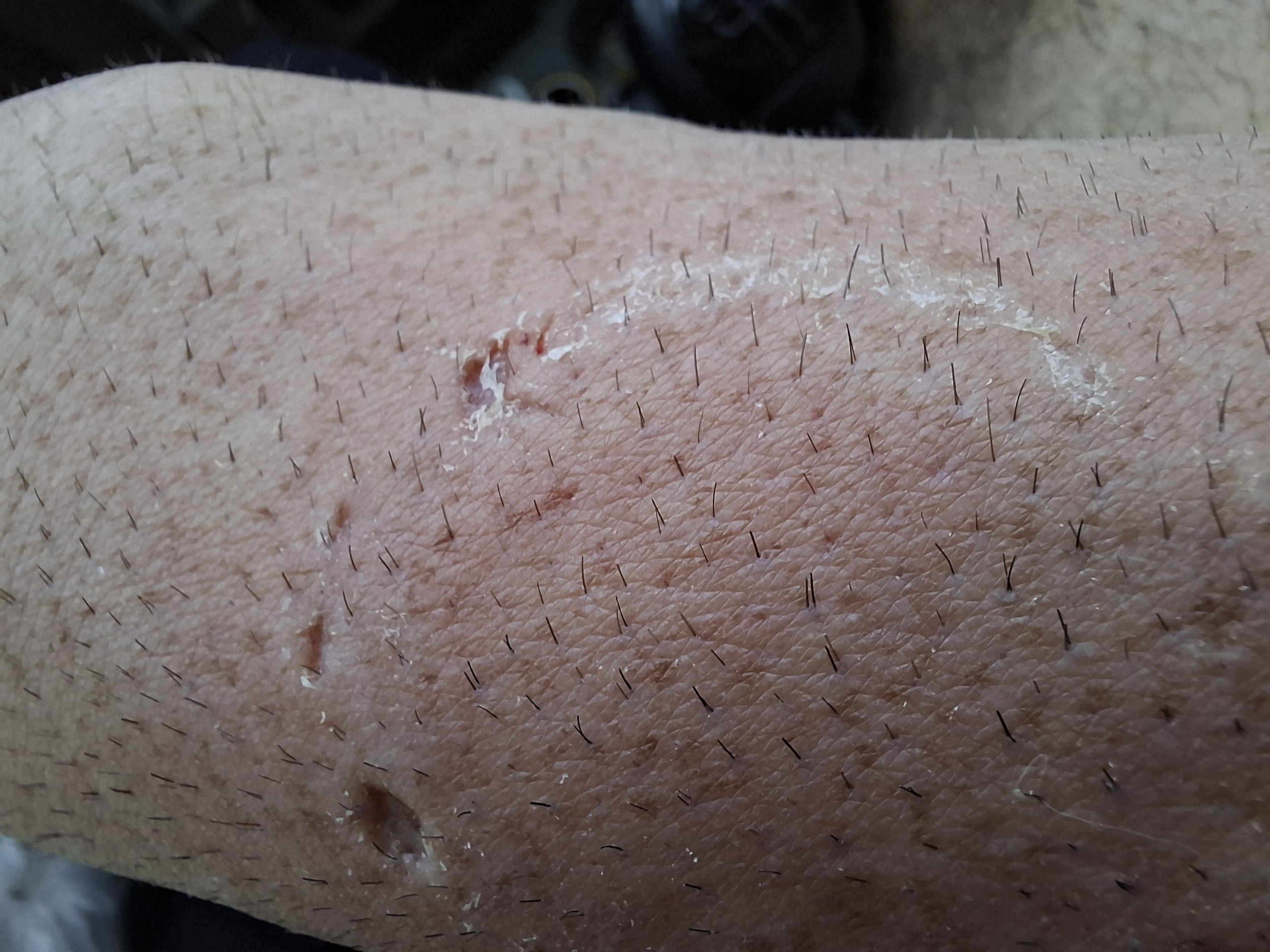
30 minutes of evolution

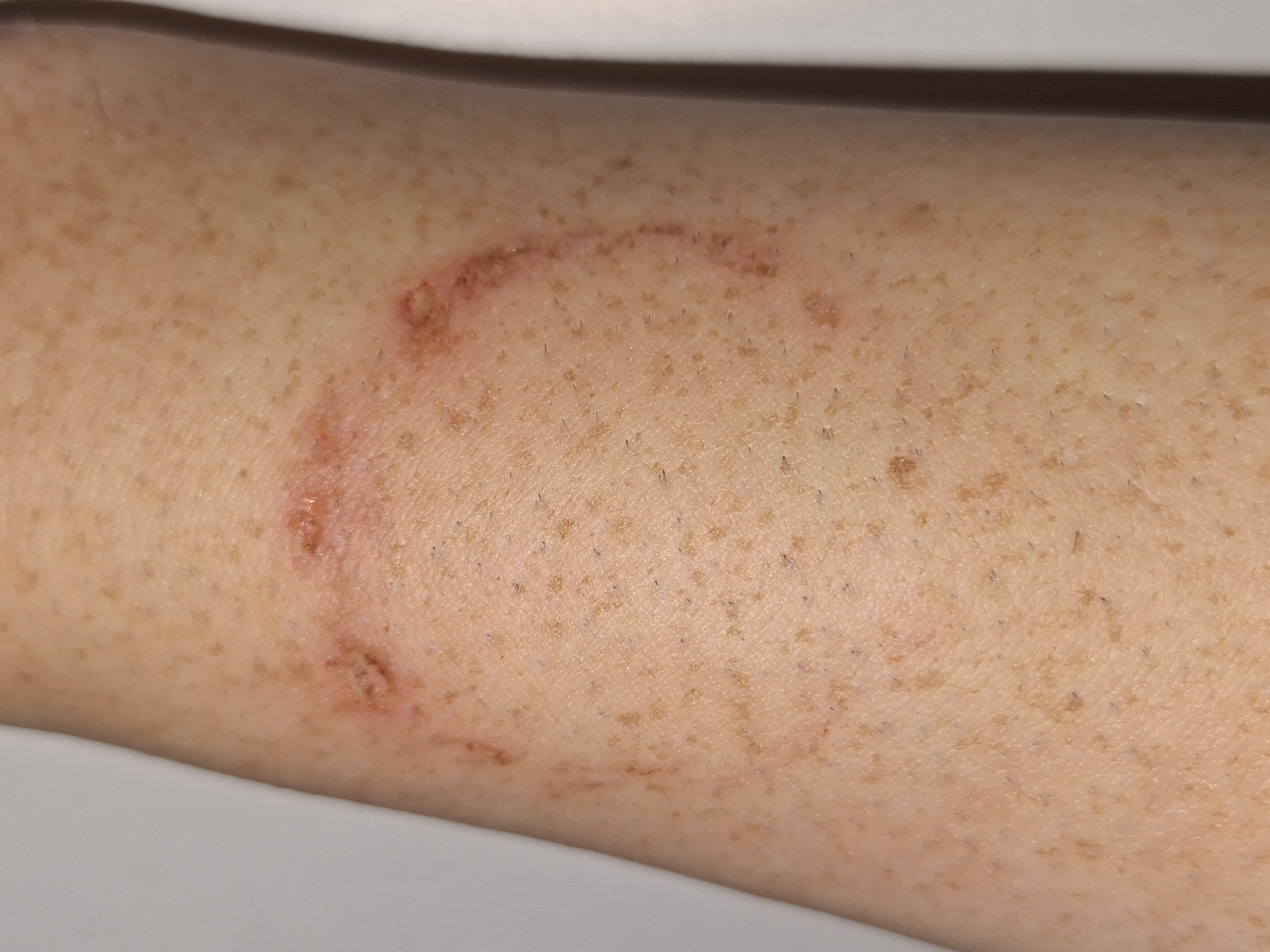
2 days of evolution

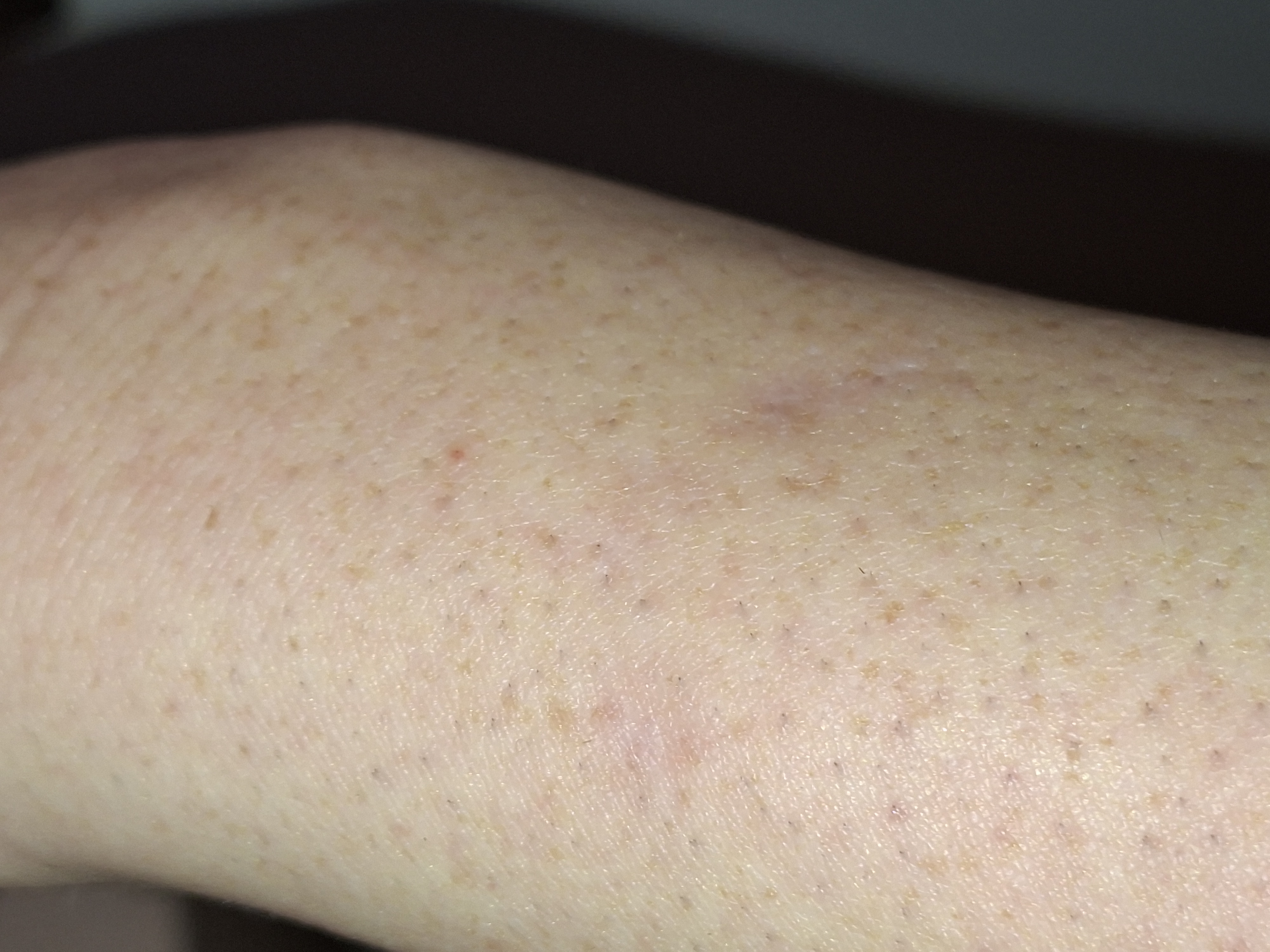
Scar after 6 months

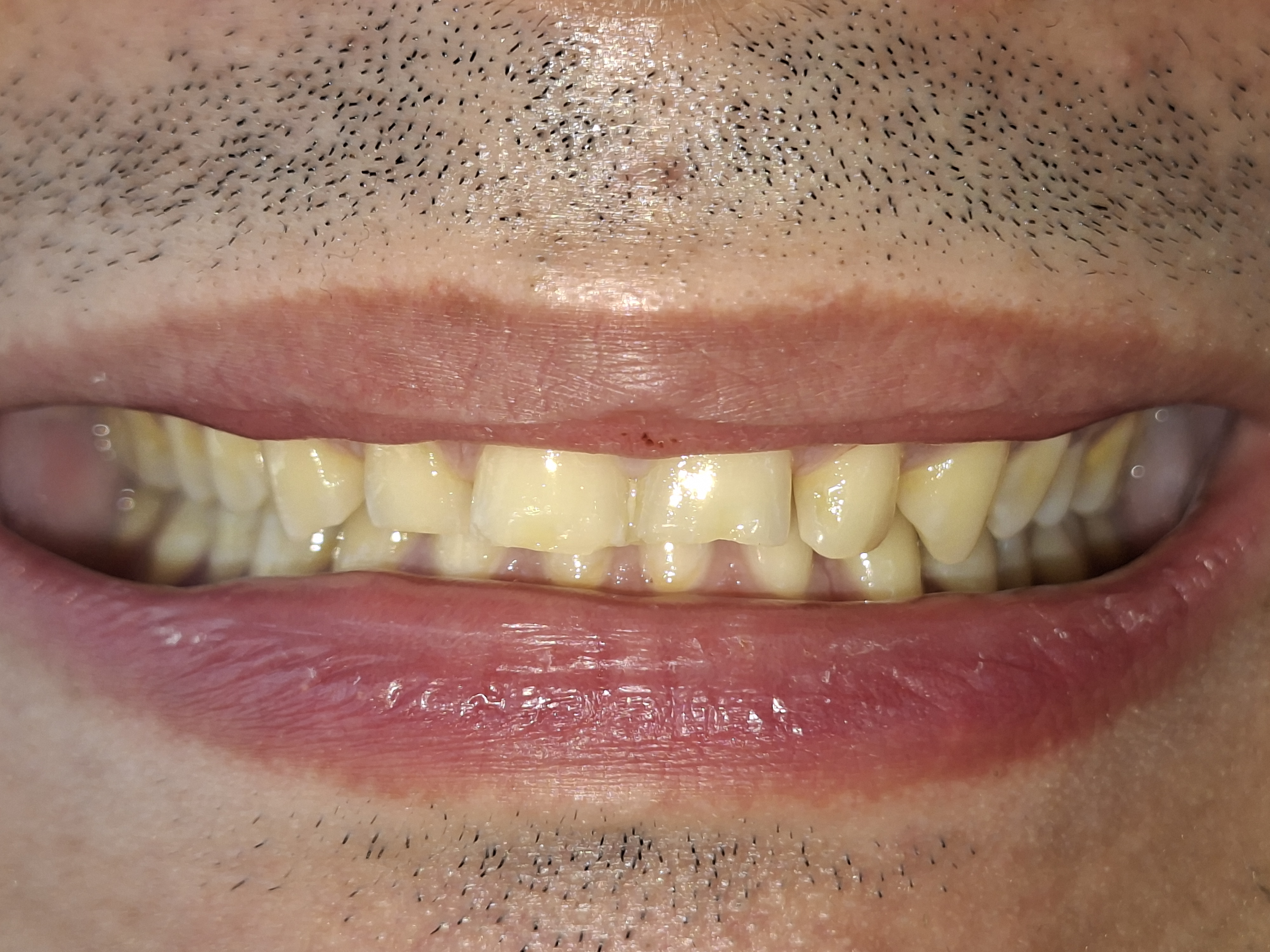
Front view of the teeth

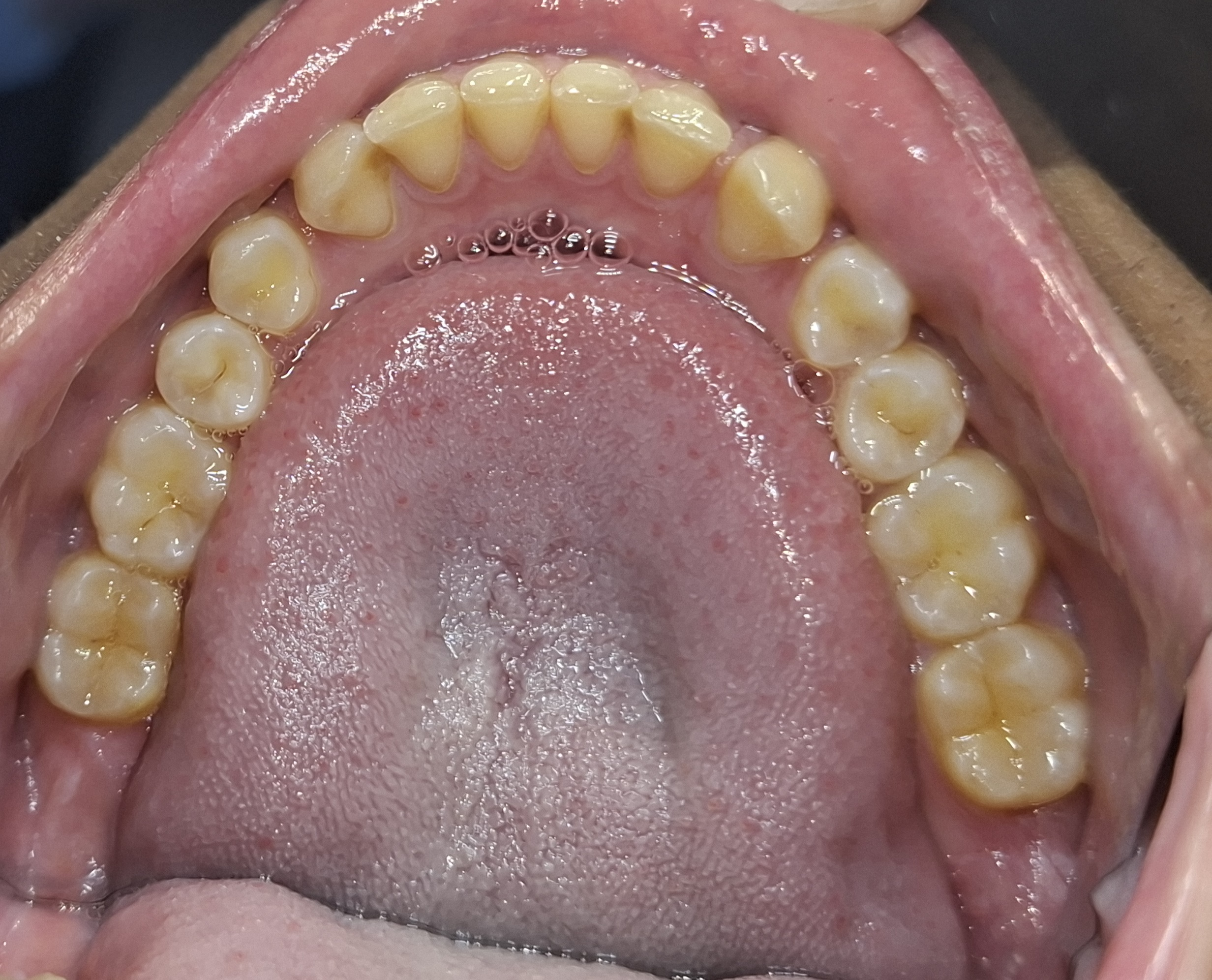
Lower dental view

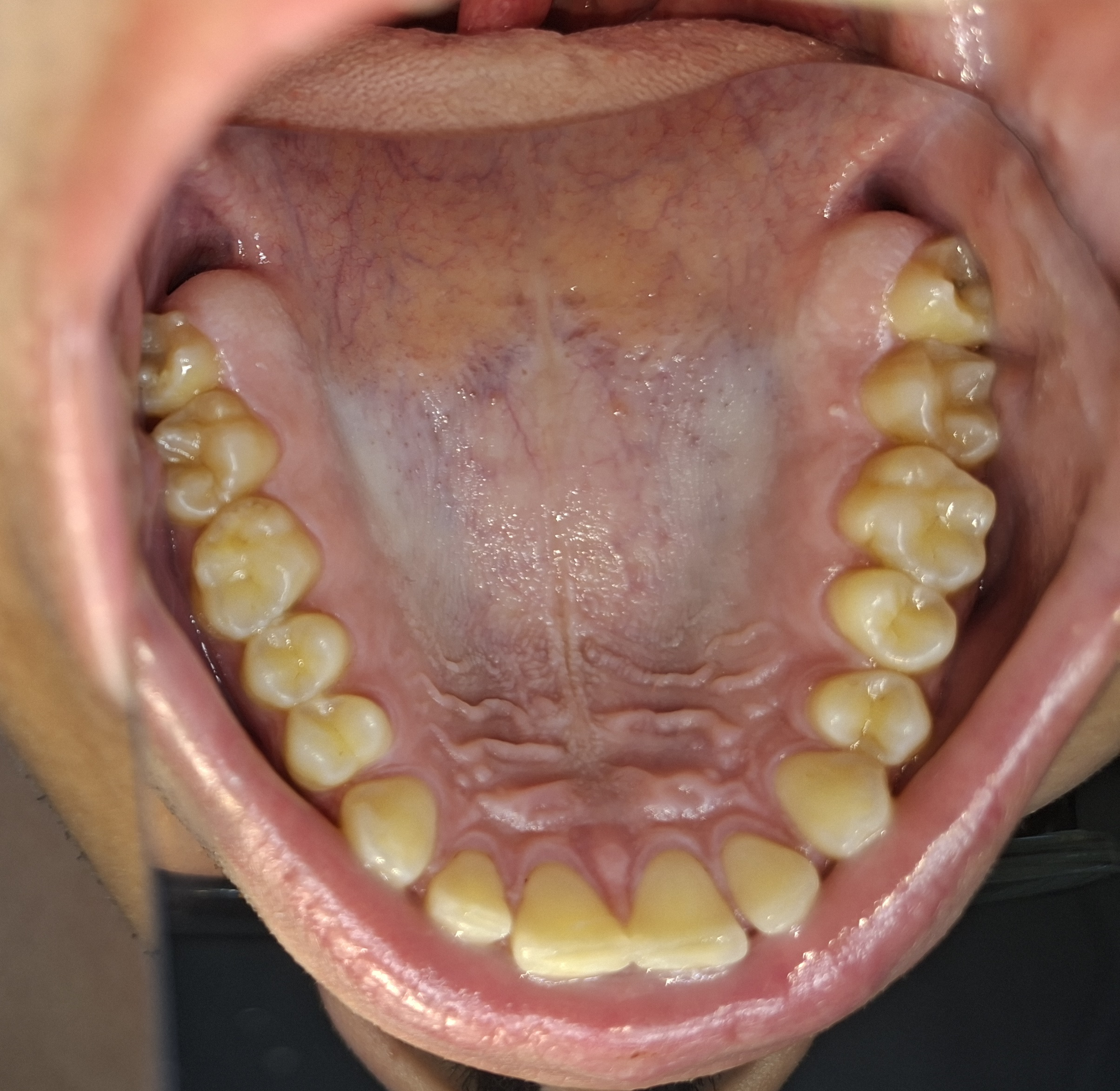
Upper teeth

Human bites have historically been viewed superstitiously, particularly in the American South where there was once a common belief that the bite of a "blue-gum negro" (i.e., a Black person with darkly pigmented gums) was lethally poisonous.

== See also ==
- Chewing
- Bite force quotient
- Animal bite
