= Kewpie doll effect =

Term used in developmental psychology

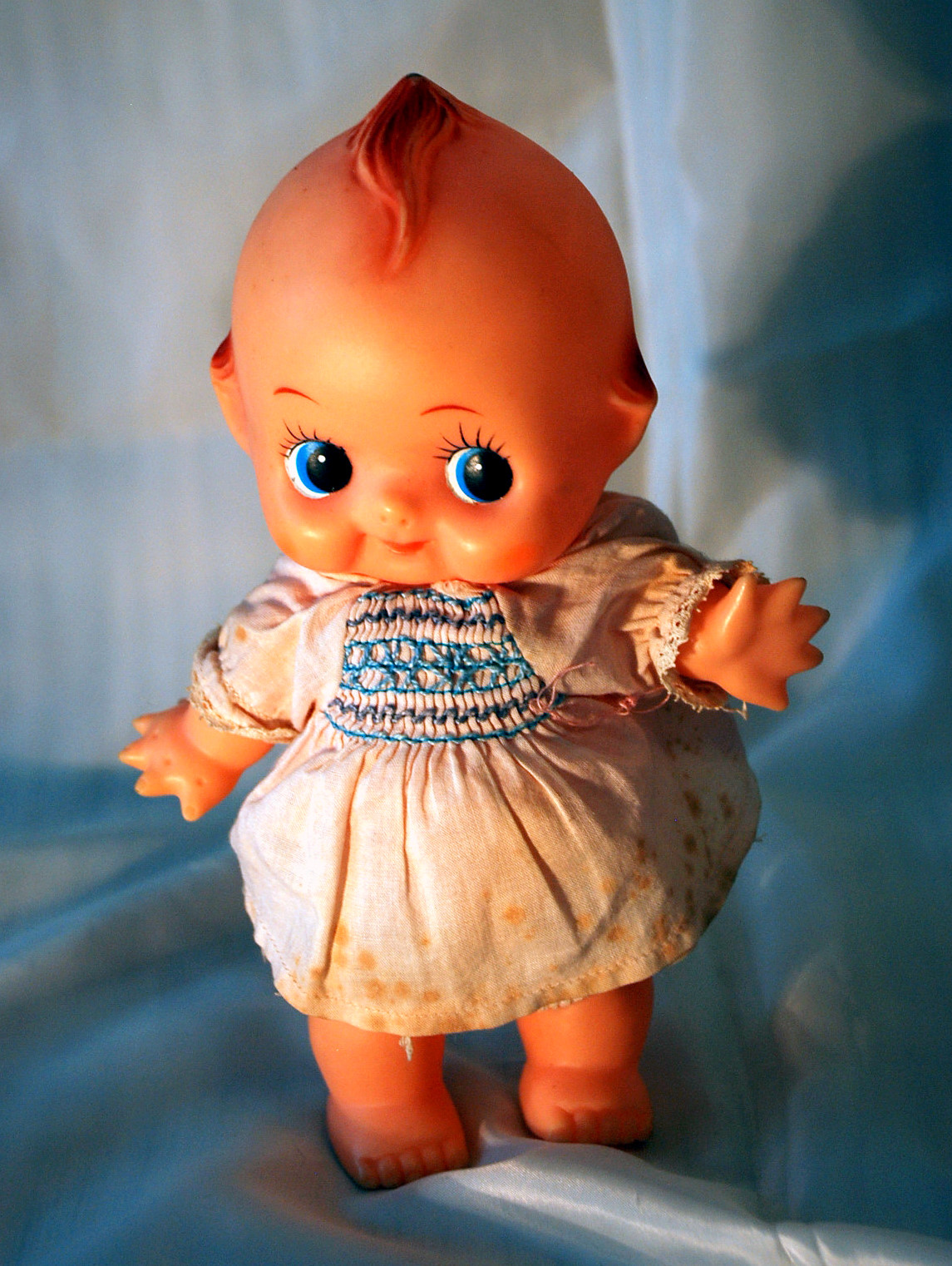
Kewpie doll

The Kewpie doll effect is a term used in developmental psychology derived from research in ethology to help explain how a child's physical features, such as lengthened forehead and rounded face, motivate the infant's caregiver to take care of them. The child's physical features are said to resemble a Kewpie doll.

== Etymology ==
The term Kewpie is short for Cupid, a Roman deity associated with love and passion, from Proto-Indo-European *kup-(e)i, to tremble or shake (with desire).

== Ethological research ==
Ethology links the study of animal behavior and biological perspectives to human behavior and social organization. Ethologist Konrad Lorenz was the first to describe the Kewpie doll effect and propose the effect's possible evolutionary significance, followed by the work of Thomas Alley in 1981.

=== Konrad Lorenz and infant physical appearance ===
In 1943, Konrad Lorenz proposed that an infant's plump, round facial features (i.e. cheeks, ears, and nose) and large forehead prompted caregivers to exhibit increased feelings of attachment to the infant because of the child's adorable appearance. Lorenz believed that the innately cute features of the infant are a preadapted characteristic that increases the individual's chance of survival and the likelihood that their genes will be passed on to further generations, similar to the innate imprinting newborn waterfowl exhibit. Lorenz believed that infants with a Kewpie doll-like appearance would receive more favorable attention from others, and therefore be more likely to thrive in their environment.

=== Perception of infant cuteness ===
Thomas Alley sought to confirm Lorenz's research in 1981. He hoped to establish a link between what Lorenz described as "Kewpie doll" appearance and perceived cuteness. Alley defined cuteness as whether an infant was pleasant to look at. Alley demonstrated that perceived cuteness decreases as the shape of the child's head changes due to aging, meaning that a child with an elongated forehead and rounded features will be perceived as more cute and adorable than children of ages two, three, or four years old. However, Alley did not discuss how a cute and attractive infant would be treated relative to an unattractive infant that does not have Kewpie doll characteristics.

== Implications for caregiver attachment ==
Several studies have shown that cuter, more attractive babies receive more attention from caregivers than unattractive babies. However, infant attractiveness has not been found to be a factor in the development of secure caregiver-child relationships, as most unattractive children and children with cranial and facial deformities establish secure, positive, loving relationships with their caregivers.

=== Mother's behavior toward attractive and unattractive infants ===
Research has shown that mothers of infants who have Kewpie doll-like appearances show more affection, play more often with, and spend more time engaged with their baby than mothers of less attractive babies, despite the common belief that parents will treat their child the same, regardless of appearance.

Psychologists compared the mother-infant interactions of three-month-old babies with craniofacial abnormalities and non craniofacially abnormal infants and observed that the mothers of the infants with abnormalities engaged their baby with smiles less often than the mothers of non craniofacially abnormal babies, spoke to their infants less, and were less responsive to their infants than were the mothers of the non craniofacially abnormal infants.

The results of this study indicate that the appearance, attractiveness, and facial configuration of an infant is a strong predictor of maternal affection and behavior toward the child.

Recent research has shown that the phenomenon of decreased responsiveness and attention was not limited to infants with mild to severe head and face deformities. Families of low socioeconomic status with healthy newborn infants were selected to participate. Photos of their newborns were rated on attractiveness by a panel of university students. Researchers observed mother-infant interactions and recorded the "affectionate interaction" between the baby and mother (how often the mother kissed, smiled at, cuddled, held the baby), the amount of time spent on "routine care-giving" (fed, changed, cleaned up after the baby), and how often the mothers "attended to others" while with the baby.

The researchers compared attractive and unattractive babies and showed that the mothers of more attractive infants had more affectionate interactions with their infants than the mothers of less attractive infants while the mothers of unattractive infants spent more time on routine care-giving and attended to others more often.

The researchers believe they have established a relationship between the attractiveness of an infant and his or her treatment by the caregiver for normal children of different attractiveness.

=== Mother's attitudes toward attractive and unattractive babies ===
Conflict exists in the research concerning mothers' attitudes toward unattractive infants. Some studies establish that mothers of unattractive babies find that their infants interfere more with their lives than do the mothers of attractive infants, and that a mother's attitude toward her child becomes more negative if the child becomes more unattractive, but several studies suggest attractiveness plays no major role in determining maternal attitudes. A study of mothers of infants with craniofacial deformities and normal children stated that mothers of children with deformities reported more positive parenting experiences than mothers of normal babies; however, the researchers in this study believe this may be a reflection and compensation of the decreased attention babies with facial deformities experience.

== In popular science ==
David Brin speculates that many factors, such as enlarging brain size, changing environments and selection pressures, have contributed to changes in facial structure over time.

David Perrett has argued that diet has had an impact on facial features, and leading some to speculate that this trend could continue, and that in the future, humans might have further neotenized features.

== See also ==
- Attachment theory
- Neoteny in humans
