= Hickey =

Mark on the skin made by sucking or biting

- Other names: Kiss mark, love bite, bug bite, love mark
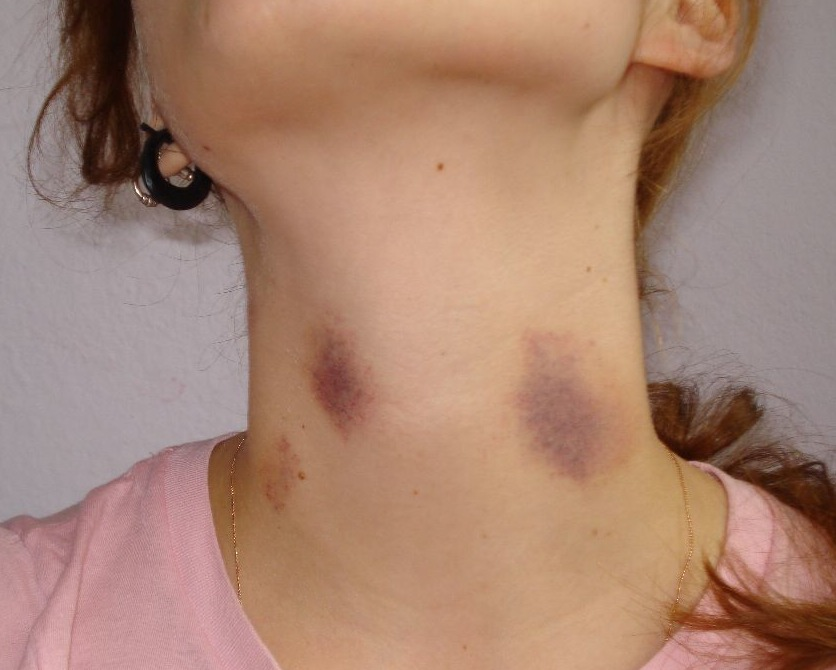
- Hickeys on the neck
- Pronunciation: /ˈhɪki/ HIK-ee
- Specialty: Dermatology
- Duration: 3–14 days
- Causes: Suction on skin

A hickey, also known as love bite, is a bruise or bruise-like, dark red or purple mark caused by sucking or biting the skin of a person, usually their neck. While biting may be part of giving a hickey, sucking is sufficient to burst small superficial blood vessels under the skin to produce bruising. A hickey is sometimes used to mark someone as being the target of a partner's romantic affection or as belonging to them. While mostly considered safe, there have been some reports of serious medical complications as a result of receiving hickeys, such as strokes, vascular or nerve damage.

== History ==
In a looser definition, the fourth-century Hindu text Kama Sutra contains references to biting with relation to kissing.

As a term, "Love bite" is first attested in 1749 in John Cleland's Memoirs of a Woman of Pleasure. The later term 'hickey', originally used in American English and still predominantly in that dialect, is of unclear etymology. Some sources suggests that it derives from the earlier meaning of "pimple, skin lesion" (c. 1915), itself perhaps a sense extension of "small gadget, device; any unspecified object" (1909).
