= Cuteness =

Subjective physical trait

Cuteness is a type of attractiveness commonly associated with youth and appearance, as well as a scientific concept and analytical model in ethology, first introduced by Austrian ethologist Konrad Lorenz. Lorenz proposed the concept of baby schema (Kindchenschema), a set of facial and body features that make a creature appear "cute" and activate ("release") in others the motivation to care for it. Cuteness may be ascribed to people as well as things that are regarded as attractive or charming.

== Juvenile traits ==
Change of head proportions (especially the relative size of the maxilla and mandible) as a function of age

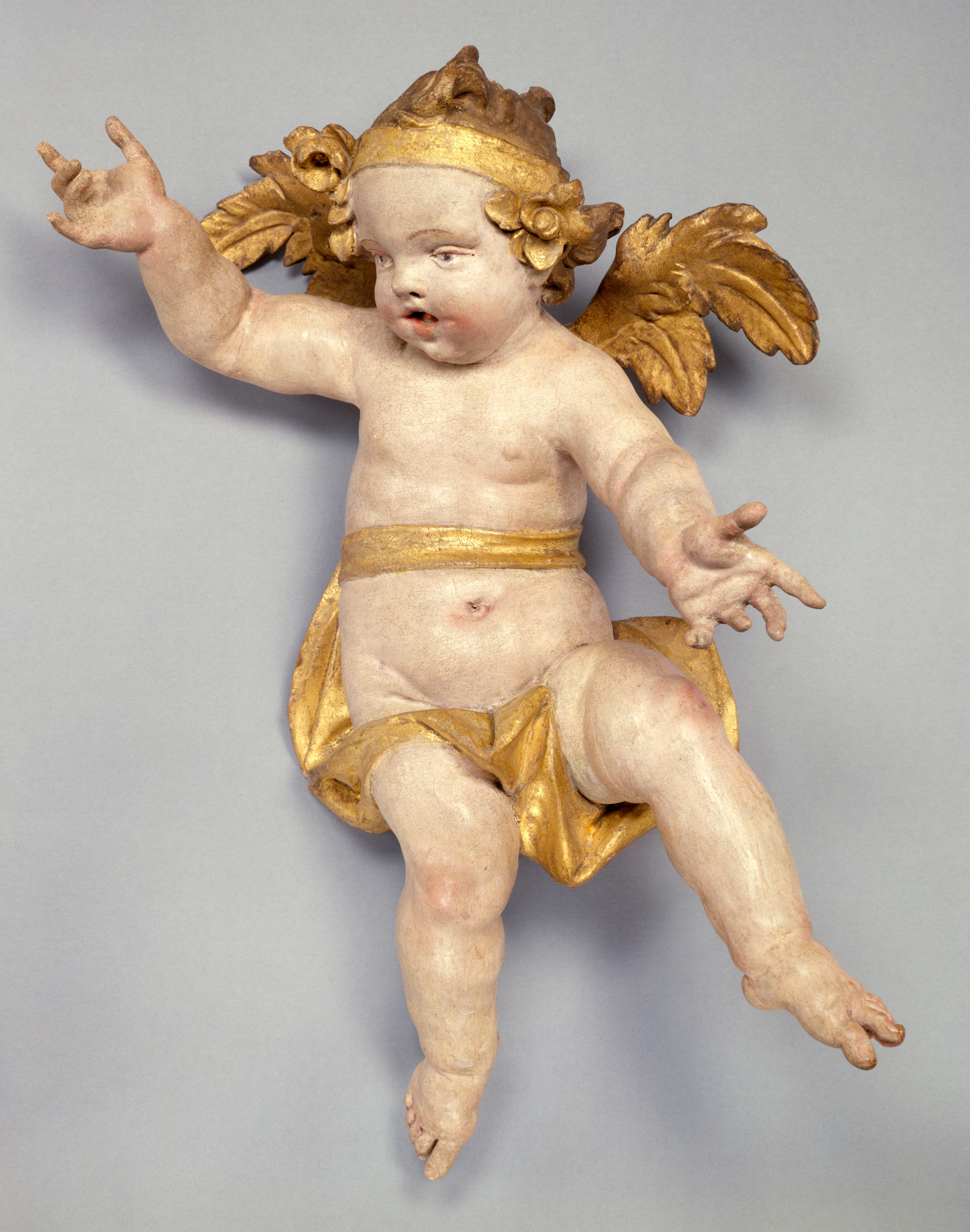
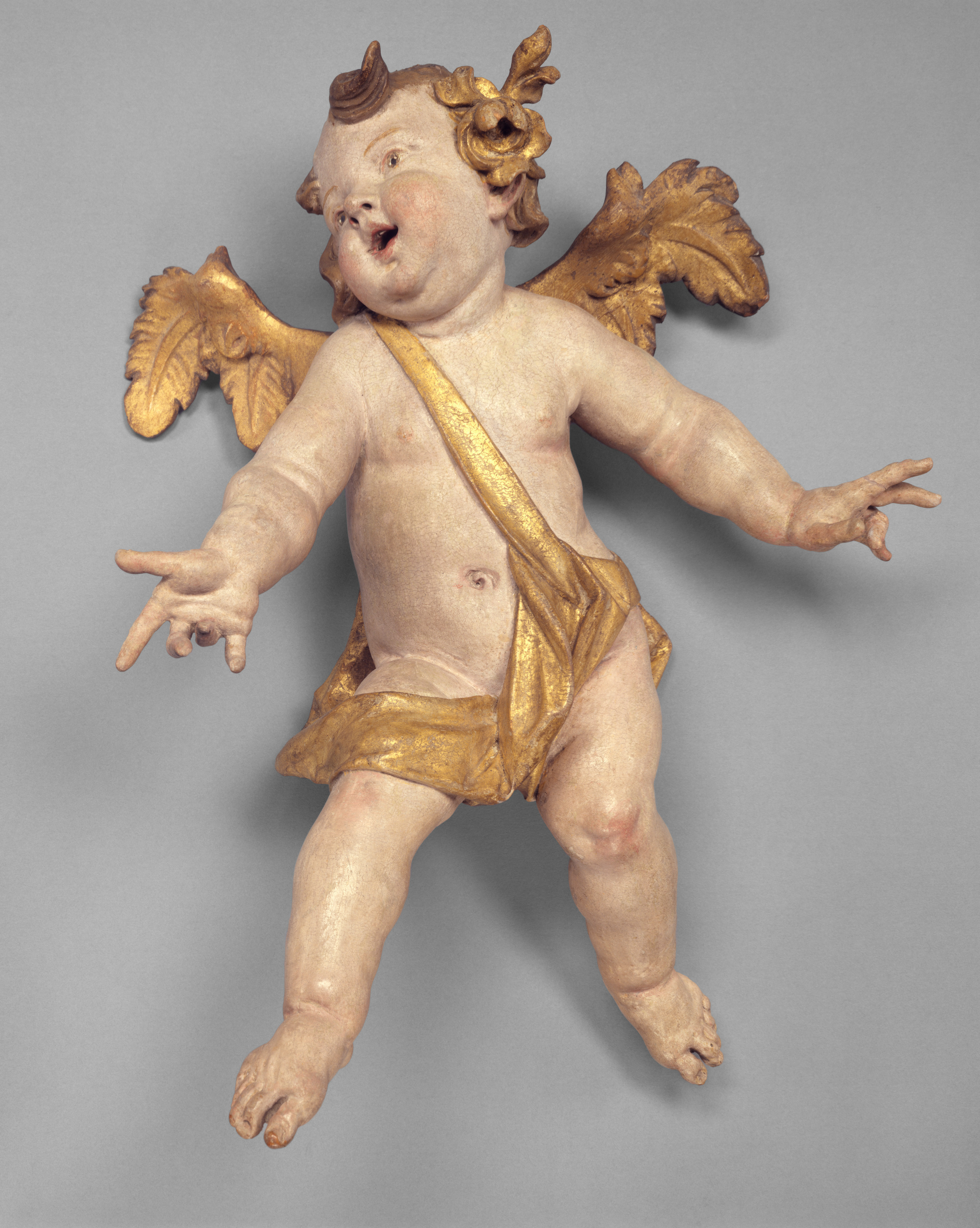
Example of two cute Baroque angels from southern Germany, from the mid-18th century, made of lindenwood, gilded and with original polychromy, in the Metropolitan Museum of Art (New York City)

Doug Jones, a visiting scholar in anthropology at Cornell University, said that the proportions of facial features change with age due to changes in hard tissue and soft tissue, and Jones said that these "age-related changes" cause juvenile animals to have the "characteristic 'cute' appearance" of proportionately smaller snouts, higher foreheads and larger eyes than their adult counterparts. In terms of hard tissue, Jones said that the neurocranium grows a lot in juveniles while the bones for the nose and the parts of the skull involved in chewing food only reach maximum growth later. In terms of soft tissue, Jones said that the cartilaginous tissues of the ears and nose continue to grow throughout a person's lifetime, starting at age twenty-five the eyebrows descend on the "supraorbital rim" from a position above the supraorbital rim to a position below it, the "lateral aspect of the eyebrows" sags with age, making the eyes appear smaller, and the red part of the lips gets thinner with age due to loss of connective tissue.

A study found that the faces of "attractive" Northern Italian Caucasian children have "characteristics of babyness" such as a "larger forehead", a smaller jaw, "a proportionately larger and more prominent maxilla", a wider face, a flatter face and larger "anteroposterior" facial dimensions than the Northern Italian Caucasian children used as a reference.

=== Biological function ===
Konrad Lorenz argued in 1949 that infantile features triggered nurturing responses in adults and that this was an evolutionary adaptation which helped ensure that adults cared for their children, ultimately securing the survival of the species. Some later scientific studies have provided further evidence for Lorenz's theory. For example, it has been shown that human adults react positively to infants who are stereotypically cute. Studies have also shown that responses to cuteness—and to facial attractiveness in general—seem to be similar across and within cultures. In a study conducted by Stephan Hamann of Emory University, he found using an fMRI, that cute pictures increased brain activity in the orbital frontal cortex.

== Growth pattern of children ==
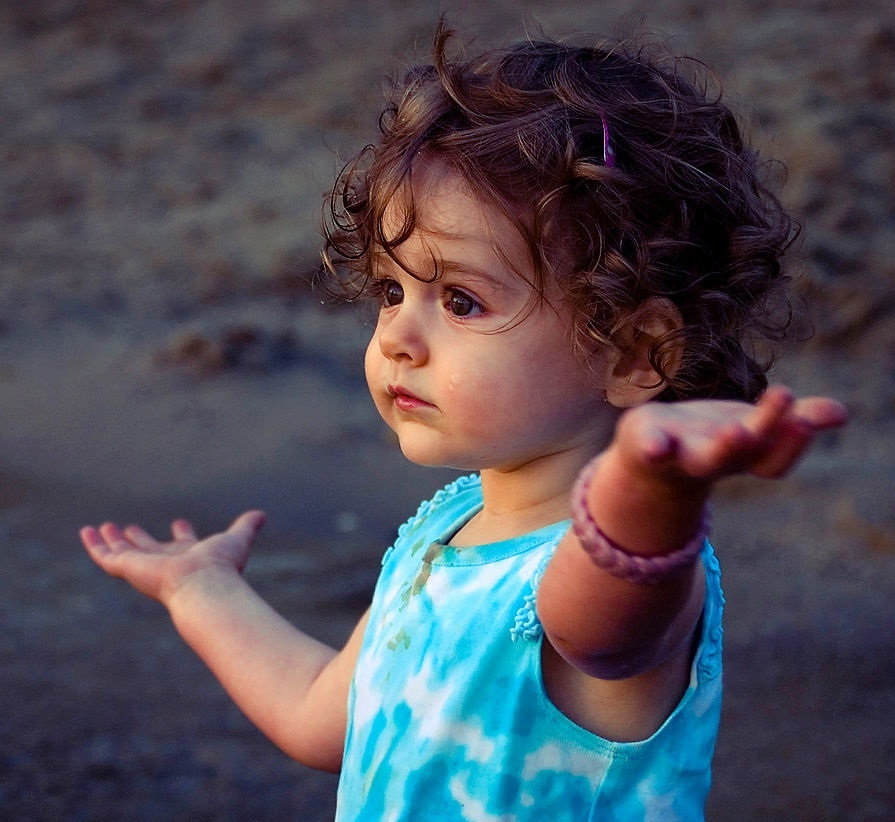
A young child

Desmond Collins, who was an Extension Lecturer of Archaeology at London University, said that the lengthened youth period of humans is part of neoteny.

Physical anthropologist Barry Bogin said that the pattern of children's growth may intentionally increase the duration of their cuteness. Bogin said that the human brain reaches adult size when the body is only 40 percent complete, when "dental maturation is only 58 percent complete" and when "reproductive maturation is only 10 percent complete". Bogin said that this allometry of human growth allows children to have a "superficially infantile" appearance (large skull, small face, small body and sexual underdevelopment) longer than in other "mammalian species". Bogin said that this cute appearance causes a "nurturing" and "care-giving" response in "older individuals".

== Gender differences ==
The perceived cuteness of an infant is influenced by the gender and behavior of the infant. In the Koyama et al. (2006) research, female infants are seen as cute for the physical attraction that female infants display more than male infants, whereas research by Karraker (1990) demonstrates that a caregiver's attention and involvement in the male infant's protection could be solely based on the perception of happiness and attractiveness of the child.

The gender of an observer can determine their perception of the difference in cuteness. In a study by Sprengelmeyer et al. (2009), it was suggested that women were more sensitive to small differences in cuteness than the same aged men. This suggests that reproductive hormones in women are important for determining cuteness.

This finding has also been demonstrated in a study conducted by T. R. Alley in which he had 25 undergraduate students (consisting of 7 men and 18 women) rate the cuteness of infants depending on different characteristics such as age, behavioral traits, and physical characteristics such as head shape, and facial feature configuration.

== Preference in young children ==
Borgi et al. stated that young children demonstrate a preference for faces with a more "infantile facial" arrangement i.e. a rounder face, a higher forehead, bigger eyes, a smaller nose and a smaller mouth. In a study that used three- to six-year-old children, Borgi et al. (2014) asserted that the children showed a viewing time preference toward the eyes of "high infantile" faces of dogs, cats and humans as opposed to "low infantile" faces of those three species.

== Hormones and cuteness variation ==
There are suggestions that hormone levels can affect a person's perception of cuteness. Konrad Lorenz suggests that "caretaking behaviour and affective orientation" towards infants as an innate mechanism, and this is triggered by cute characteristics such as "chubby cheeks" and large eyes. The Sprengelmeyer et al. (2009) study expands on this claim by manipulating baby pictures to test groups on their ability to detect differences in cuteness. The studies show that premenopausal women detected cuteness better than same aged postmenopausal women. Furthermore, to support this claim, women taking birth control pills that raise levels of reproductive hormones detect cuteness better than same aged women not taking the pill.

Sprengelmeyer gathered 24 young women, 24 young men, and 24 older women to participate in his study. He ran three studies in which images of white European babies were shown, and the participants were asked to rate them on a cuteness scale of one to seven. The study found differences among the groups in cuteness discrimination, which ruled out cohort and social influences on perceived cuteness. In the second study it was found that premenopausal women discriminated cuteness at a higher level than their postmenopausal female peers. This finding suggested a biological factor, which was then investigated further in the third study. Here, Sprengelmeyer compared cuteness sensitivity between premenopausal women who were, and were not taking oral contraceptives. The study concluded that post-perceptual processes were impacted by hormone levels (progesterone and estrogen specifically) in females, and thus impacted sensitivity to cuteness.

== Caregiving correlates ==
A study by Konrad Lorenz in the early 1940s found that the shape of an infant's head positively correlated with adult caregiving and an increased perception of "cute". However a study by Thomas Alley found no such correlation and pointed out faulty procedures in that study. Alley's study found that cephalic head shape of an infant did induce a positive response from adults, and these children were considered to be more "cute". In his study, Alley had 25 undergraduate students rate line drawings of an infant's face. The same drawing was used each time, however the cephalic head shape was changed using a cardioidal transformation (a transformation that models cephalic growth in relation to ageing process) to adjust the perceived age; other features of the face were not changed. The study concluded that a large head shape increased perceived cuteness, which then elicited a positive response in adult caretaking. The study also noted that perceived cuteness was also dependent on other physical and behavioural characteristics of the child, including age.

In a study by McCabe (1984) of children whose ages ranged from toddlers to teenagers, the children with more "adult-like" facial proportions were more likely to have experienced physical abuse than children of the same age who had less "adult-like" facial proportions.

A study by Karraker (1990) suggested that "an adult's beliefs about the personality and expected behavior of an infant can influence the adult's interaction with the infant", and gave evidence that in this way "basic cuteness effects may occasionally be obscured in particular infants". Koyama (2006) said that an adult caregiver's perception of an infant's cuteness can motivate the amount of care and protection the caregiver provides, and the admiration demonstrated toward the infant, and concluded that "the adults' protective feeling for children appeared to be a more important criterion for the judgment of a boy's cuteness."

Melanie Glocker (2009) provided experimental evidence that infants' cuteness motivates caretaking in adults, even if they are not related to the infant. Glocker asked individuals to rate the level of cuteness of pictured infants and noted the motivation that these participants had to care for the infants. The research suggested that individuals' rating of the perceived cuteness of an infant corresponded to the level of motivation an individual had to care for this infant. Glocker and colleagues then used functional magnetic resonance imaging (fMRI), to demonstrate that baby faces with higher content of baby schema features, generated more activation in the nucleus accumbens, a small brain area central to motivation and reward. This work elucidated the neural mechanism through which baby schema (Kindchenschema) may motivate ("release") caretaking behavior. Furthermore, cute infants were more likely to be adopted and rated as more "likeable, friendly, healthy and competent" than infants who were less cute. There is an implication that baby schema response is crucial to human development because it lays the foundation for caregiving and the relationship between child and caretaker.

Sherman, Haidt, & Coan (2009), in two experiments, found that exposure to high cuteness stimuli increased performance when playing the Operation game, a task that requires extreme carefulness. The study said that the shift in behavior toward greater carefulness is consistent with the viewpoint that cuteness is something that releases the human caregiving system. The study said that the shift in behavior toward greater carefulness also makes sense as an adaptation for caring for small children.

== Cultural significance ==
Stephen Jay Gould and Nancy Etcoff cited Mickey Mouse as an example of a cartoon character intentionally designed to be cute

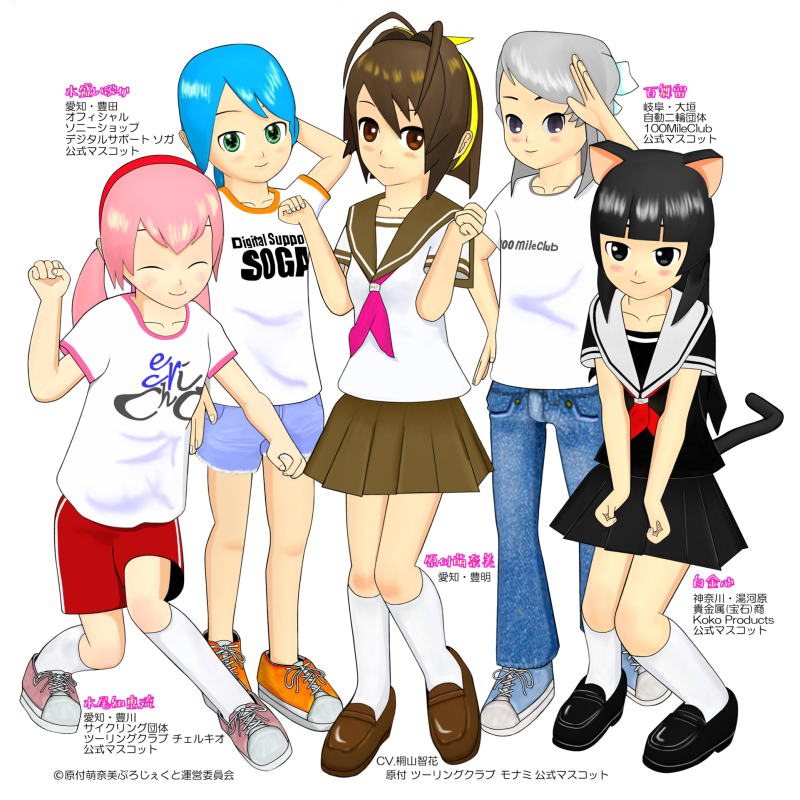
Examples of kawaii character designs

Doug Jones, a visiting scholar in anthropology at Cornell University, said that the faces of monkeys, dogs, birds and even the fronts of cars can be made to appear cuter by morphing them with a "cardioidal" (heart-shaped) mathematical transformation. Jones said that negative cardioidal strain results in faces appearing less mature and cuter by causing facial features at the top of the face to expand outward and upward while causing features at the bottom of the face to contract inward and upward.

Stephen Jay Gould said that over time Mickey Mouse had been drawn to resemble a juvenile more with a relatively larger head, larger eyes, a larger and more bulging cranium, a less sloping and more rounded forehead, shorter, thicker and "pudgier" legs, thicker arms and a thicker snout which gave the appearance of being less protrusive. Gould suggested that this change in Mickey's image was intended to increase his popularity by making him appear cuter and "inoffensive". Gould said that the neotenous changes to Mickey's form were similar to the neotenous changes that occurred in human evolution.

Nancy Etcoff, Ph.D. in psychology from Boston University, said "cartoonists capitalize on our innate preferences for juvenile features", and she mentioned Mickey Mouse and Bambi as examples of this trend. She said Mickey Mouse's bodily proportions "aged in reverse" since his inception, because "[h]is eyes and head kept getting bigger while his limbs kept getting shorter and thicker", culminating in him resembling a "human infant". She further mentioned the "exaggerated high forehead" and the "doe eyes" of Bambi as another example of this trend.

Mark J. Estren, Ph.D. in psychology from the University at Buffalo, said cute animals get more public attention and scientific study due to having physical characteristics that would be considered neotenous from the perspective of human development. Estren said that humans should be mindful of their bias for cute animals, so animals that would not be considered cute are also valued in addition to cute animals.

The perception of cuteness is culturally diverse. The differences across cultures can be significantly associated to the need to be socially accepted. Kawaii is a concept in Japanese popular culture that describes cuteness and innocence. Kawaii aesthetics are commonly found in anime and manga, and elements of it also appear in contemporary Japanese street fashion.

== Cute animals ==
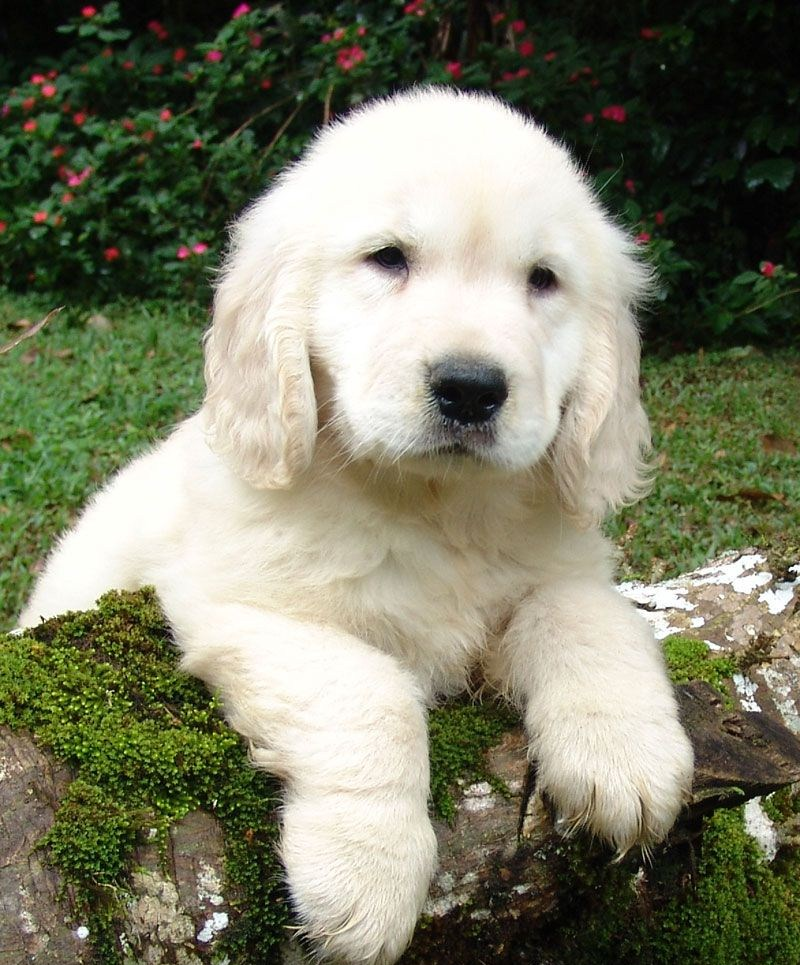
Golden Retriever puppy

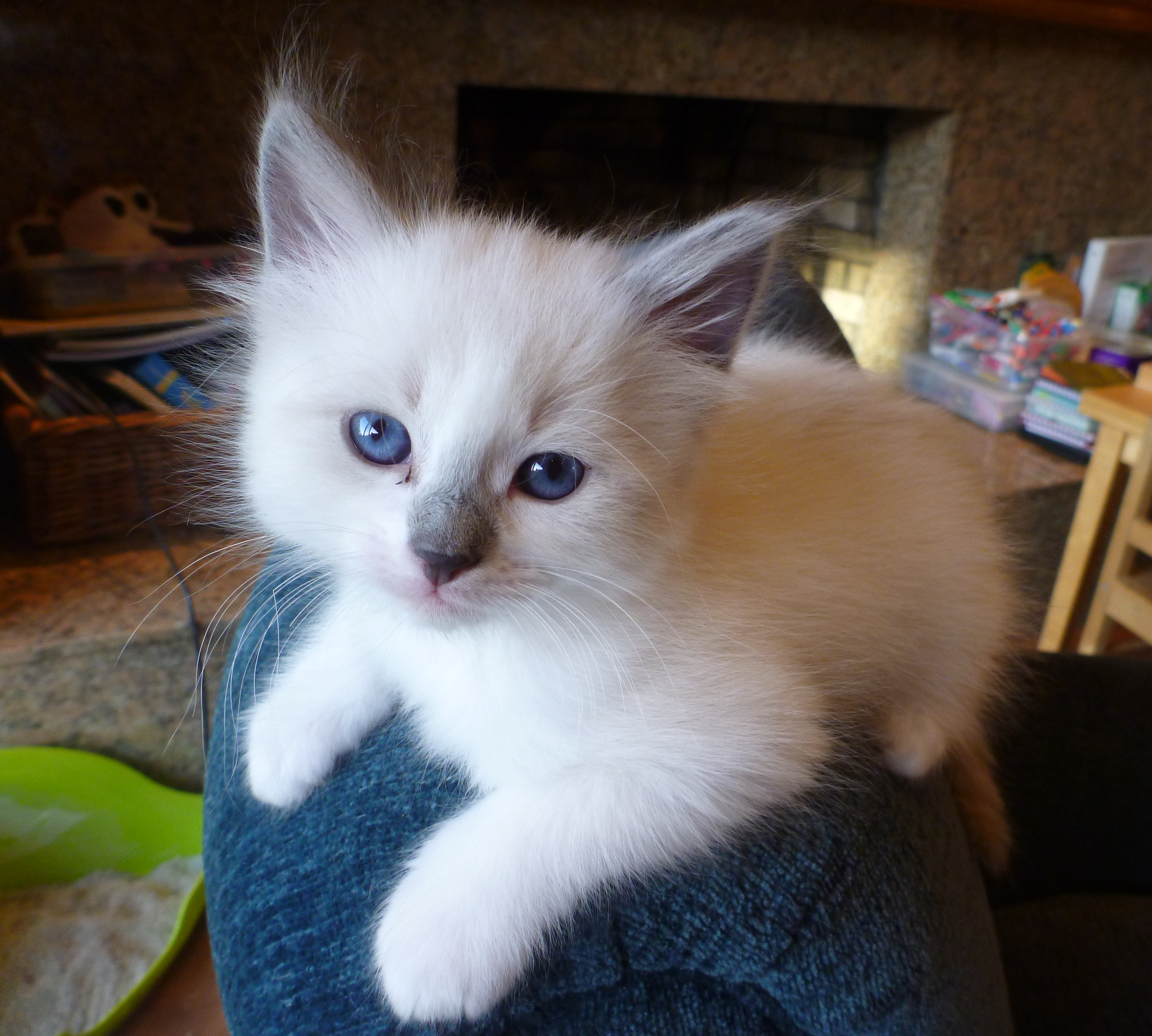
A Ragdoll kitten

Sherman, Haidt, & Coan (2009) used images of puppies and kittens for the study's "high cuteness" stimuli in two experiments.

William R. Miller, assistant professor of biology at Baker University in Kansas, said that most people, upon seeing tardigrades, say that they are the cutest invertebrates.

Kenta Takada (2016) said that Miyanoshita (2008) said that the design of chocolates made to look like rhinoceros beetle larvae is a design that is both cute and disgusting.

Evolutionary biologists suspect that "puppy dog eyes", a trait absent from wild wolves, were unintentionally selected for by humans during the domestication of dogs. In order to obtain pets with particularly cute faces, some breeds of dogs have been bred with increasingly severe cranial deformities called brachycephaly, for example, the French Bulldog, who consequently suffer from Brachycephalic airway obstructive syndrome.

== See also ==
- Beauty
- Cute aggression
- Cute Girls Doing Cute Things
- Kawaii – Japanese concept related to cuteness
- Kewpie doll effect
- Neoteny
