= Cute aggression =

Desire to treat cute things aggressively

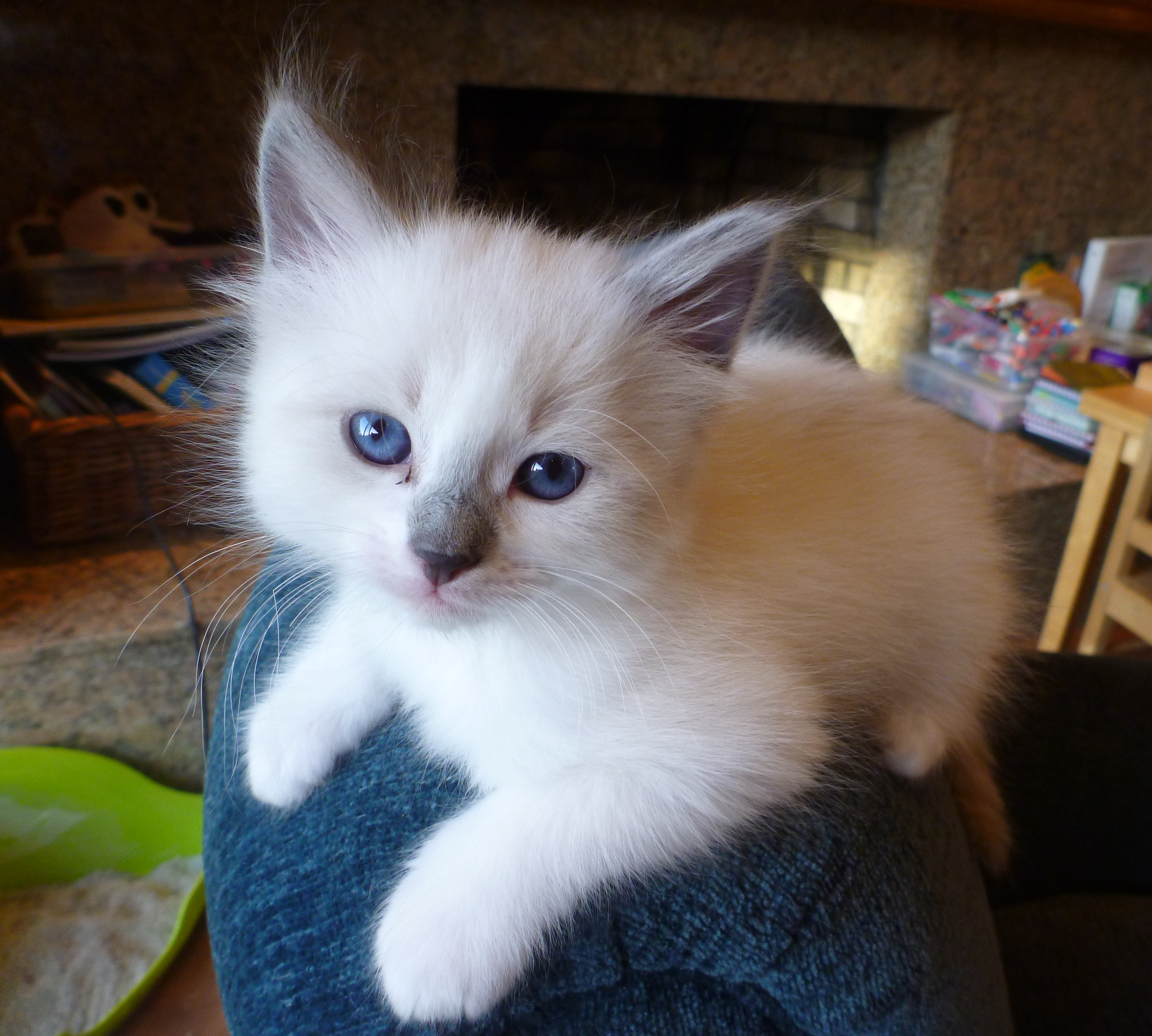
Stimuli like this image can elicit superficially aggressive tendencies mediated by hormonal control.

Cute aggression, also known as gigil, cuteness aggression, or playful aggression, is the urge to squeeze, bite, or otherwise act aggressively toward things perceived as being cute without the desire to cause any harm. It is a common type of dimorphous display, where a person experiences positive and negative expressions simultaneously in a disorganised manner. Individuals experiencing cute aggression may find themselves clenching their jaw or fists, with the urge to squish, pinch, or bite an adorable baby, animal, or object. About half of adults report experiencing cute aggression.

== Terminology ==
Social psychologist Oriana Aragón and colleagues defined the phenomenon of cute aggression in their published research paper in 2015. They also referred to these experiences with the alternative term "playful aggression", defining it as follows:

Playful aggression is in reference to the expressions that people show sometimes when interacting with babies. Sometimes we say things and appear to be more angry than happy, even though we are happy. For example some people grit their teeth, clench their hands, pinch cheeks, or say things like "I want to eat you up!" It would be difficult to ask about every possible behaviour of playful aggression, so we ask generally about things of this kind—calling them playful aggressions.

=== In other languages ===
The concept of cute aggression is reflected in various terms across many languages. The word gigil is used in English and derives from the Tagalog language word for cute aggression. The word geram in Malay is also polysemous, with meanings associated with expressing a love-hate anger toward something cute, evoking urges to squeeze it affectionately, and describes a feeling of dissatisfaction too. The expression man khiaao (มัน-เขี้ยว) in Thai means that an individual wants to "eat them up" as they are "so cute", often in relation to people or animals. The verb man directly translates "to enjoy", and khiaao translates to "fang" or "canine". The Chamorro language contains the term ma'goddai. This describes the strong feelings one gets when admiring someone's pleasantly chubby appearance, causing an urge to pinch, squeeze, or smother the person in kisses.

== Neurological response ==
=== Brain structure ===
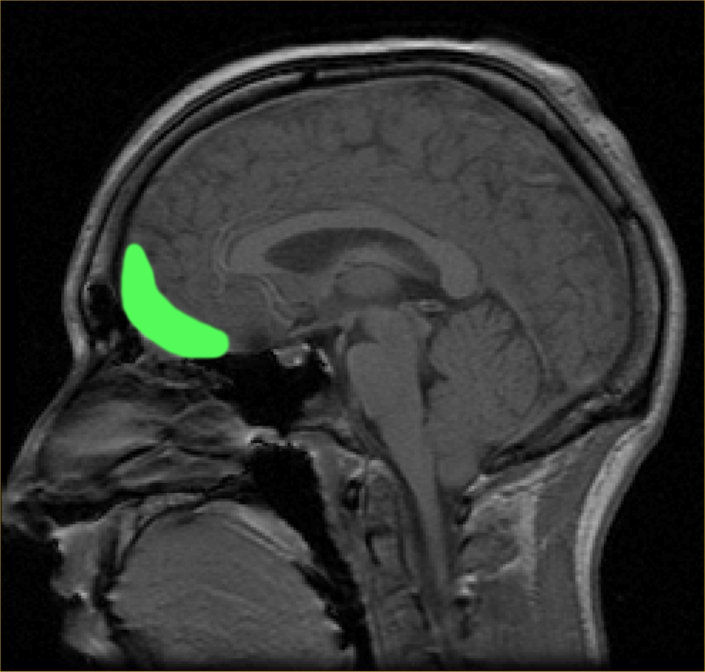
MRI scan of the brain, highlighting the orbitofrontal cortex

Research using EEG scans discovered that emotion centers and reward centers in the brain lit up when participants viewed images of baby animals, and that emotions were stronger for animals perceived as more cute. Specifically, activity in the orbitofrontal cortex (an area associated with emotion and pleasure) increases, as quickly as one-seventh of a second after seeing a baby face.

=== Hormones ===
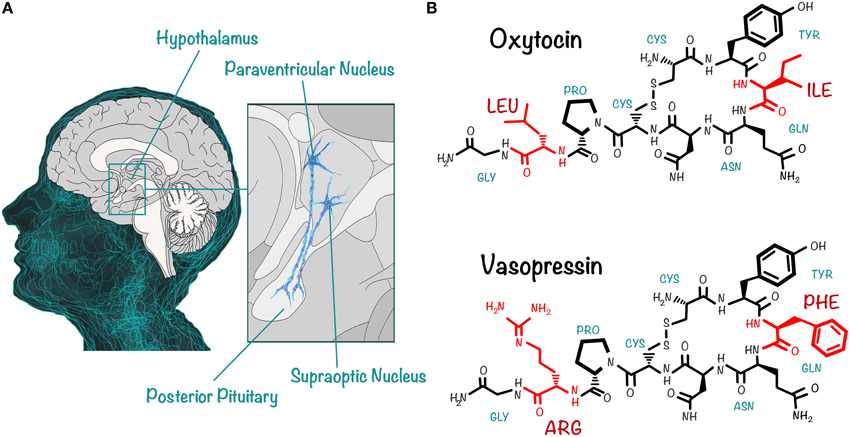
The pituitary neuropeptides oxytocin and vasopressin which have been shown to affect social processes in mammals

The interaction between the neurohormones oxytocin and vasopressin offer proximate explanations for why cute stimuli can elicit contradictory responses of affection and aggression. They are distinct molecules and are evolved components of an adaptive system humans have for long term attachment.

The hormone oxytocin (often called the "cuddle hormone" or the "love hormone") is produced in the hypothalamus in the brain and released into the bloodstream by the pituitary gland upon seeing something cute and neuropeptide surges contribute to feelings of affection. Vasopressin is also produced in the hypothalamus and released from the posterior pituitary in the brain. When released it compels the individual to protect and defend what is considered vulnerable. Many mammals, such as grizzly bears, will display aggressive behaviour to protect their young.

== Evolutionary explanation ==
Evolution suggests that this seemingly paradoxical response may have provided adaptive advantages in human ancestors, aiding in the care and protection of vulnerable offspring.

Humans are an altricial species and rely heavily upon parental care in order for their offspring to survive. Humans have low reproductive rates relative to other species, amplifying the importance of parental care for the survival of their few offspring. Infantile traits like big eyes, round faces, and small size evoke perceptions of cuteness, and trigger innate caregiving instincts in humans. These cute behaviors highlight the child's vulnerability which adults are receptive to. Psychoanalyst John Bowlby in his Evolutionary Theory of Attachment suggests that babies are pre-programmed to elicit attachments from caregivers to increase their chances of survival. He explained how babies use social releasers including smiling, crying, and making eye contact to attract the attention of caregivers. The gradient is most intense with objects that humans perceive to be more cute in comparison to objects that are not as cute, but they still generate a response. The same adoration that humans are compelled to feel for their young may carry over to other animals with similar physiological traits which require care such as puppies and kittens.

Biological response of oxytocin attaches the adults to infants and vasopressin is somehow associated with aggressive feelings. Cute aggression, such as biting, squeezing, and tickling, is related to the intersection of emotional responses and reward centers. Some have postulated that this impulse serves an evolutionary purpose; if a human were to continually stare at their children, in awe over how adorable they are while being negligent to the environment and immediate surroundings, the children could be attacked by a wild animal in the vicinity when the parent is not aware and suffer harm. Others have hypothesized that the feelings of aggression may be a coping mechanism for the brain to regulate overwhelming positive emotions, similar to how people may cry when happy or laugh when uncomfortable.

== Research ==
=== Psychological reactions ===
A study conducted in 2015 by Aragon and colleagues sought to explain whether cute aggression as a dimorphous expression serves as a regulatory mechanism during overwhelming emotional experiences. They outline how dimorphous expressions of emotion feature the distinct pattern of one stimulus event, one appraisal, one emotional experience but two expressive behaviours. Their 143 participant survey results found more infantile babies received higher positive appraisals (M = 66.88) than less-infantile babies (M = 56.68). Participants reported feeling more overwhelmed with positive feelings towards the more-infantile babies (M = 42.74) while expressing more aggressive urges towards them compared to less infantile babies (M = 33.35).

=== Physiological reactions ===
A more recent study conducted by Stravropoulos and colleagues in 2018, used electroencephalography (EEG) scans to investigate brain activity during cute aggression experiences. Fifty-four participants rated their reactions to baby animal images comparing these to adult animals. Higher ratings were given after viewing baby animals and the EEG analysis found in the N200 component, emotional responses peaked around 200 ms after stimulus onset. Participants who reported higher levels of cute aggression showed a stronger reward processing response in the mesolimbic system. The involvement of emotional and reward processing in the brain enables insight to the underlying mechanisms of cute aggression.
