= Brooke Greenberg =

First documented case of neotenic complex syndrome (1993–2013)

- Born: Brooke Megan Greenberg; January 8, 1993; Baltimore, Maryland, United States
- Died: October 24, 2013 (aged 20); Baltimore, Maryland, United States
- Cause of death: Bronchomalacia
- Known for: Neotenic complex syndrome

Brooke Megan Greenberg (January 8, 1993 – October 24, 2013) was an American who became famous for being the first documented case of neotenic complex syndrome. Throughout her life of 20 years, she remained physically and cognitively similar to a toddler despite her increasing age. She was about 30 in (76 cm) tall, weighed about 16 lb (7.3 kg), and had an estimated mental age of nine months to one year.

== Birth and early life ==
Brooke was born on January 8, 1993, to parents Howard and Melanie Greenberg at Sinai Hospital in Baltimore, Maryland. She was delivered by caesarean section, one month before her due date due to "intermittent growth", weighing just four pounds (1.8 kg). She was born with anterior hip dislocation, a condition that caused her legs to be swiveled upward toward her shoulders; it was corrected surgically. Otherwise, Brooke appeared to be a typical infant. She was the third of four girls born to her parents.

In her first six years, she went through a series of unexplained medical emergencies from which she recovered. She had seven perforated stomach ulcers. She also had a seizure. This was followed by what was later diagnosed as a stroke; weeks later, no damage was detected. At age five, Brooke had a mass in her brain that caused her to go into a deep sleep (after confirmation that it was not a coma) for 14 days. The doctors diagnosed the mass as a brain tumor. She later awoke, and physicians found no tumor present. Brooke's pediatrician, Dr. Lawrence Pakula, stated that the source of her sudden illness remains a mystery.

During an interview on the talk show Katie, her father stated that, between the ages of four and five months, she stopped growing. Child Frozen In Time, a documentary about Brooke, was first broadcast on TLC on August 9, 2009.

== Unexplained condition ==
Over several years, the Greenbergs visited many specialists, looking for an explanation for their daughter's strange condition, yet there was no diagnosis of any known genetic syndrome or chromosomal abnormality. In 2001, when Dateline documented Brooke at eight years of age, she was still the size of a six-month-old infant, weighing just 13 lb (5.9 kg) at 30 inches (76 cm) tall. The family still had no explanation. Brooke's mother Melanie said, "They [the specialists] just said she'll catch up. Then we went to the nutritionist, the endocrinologist. We tried the growth hormone…". The growth hormone treatment had no effect. Howard, Brooke's father, said, "I mean, she did not put on an ounce, or she did not grow an inch... That's when I knew there was a problem." After the growth hormone administration failed, the doctors, unable to diagnose a known condition, named her condition Syndrome X.

The Greenbergs made many visits to nearby Johns Hopkins Children's Center and even took Brooke to New York's Mount Sinai Hospital, searching for information about their daughter's condition. When geneticists sequenced Greenberg's DNA, they found that the genes associated with the premature aging diseases were normal, unlike the mutated versions in patients with Werner syndrome and progeria.

== Medical studies ==
In 2006, Richard Walker, an endocrine physiologist at the University of South Florida College of Medicine, said that Brooke's body was not developing as a coordinated unit but as independent parts that were out of synchronization. She was never diagnosed with any known genetic disorder or chromosomal abnormality that would help explain why. Her telomeres seemed to be shortening at the normal rate.

In 2009, Walker said, "There've been very minimal changes in Brooke's brain … Various parts of her body, rather than all being at the same stage, seem to be disconnected." Walker noted that Brooke's brain, for example, was not much more mature than that of a newborn infant. He estimated her mental age at around nine months to a year old. Brooke could make gestures and recognize sounds but could not speak. Her bones were like those of a ten-year-old, and she still had her baby teeth, which had an estimated developmental age of about eight years. Walker said, "We think that Brooke's condition presents us with a unique opportunity to understand the process of aging." "Different parts of her body are developing at different rates, as if they were not a unit but parts of separate organisms," Walker explained.

== Death ==
Brooke Greenberg died on October 24, 2013, at the Herman and Walter Samuelson Children's Hospital at Sinai Medical Center in Baltimore, the same hospital where she was born. Her funeral service took place on October 27, 2013, and that same morning, she was buried at Baltimore Hebrew Cemetery - Berrymans Lane, in Reisterstown, Maryland. The cause of her death was bronchomalacia, a medical condition usually occurring in children, which results in difficulty breathing due to weak cartilage in the walls of the bronchial tubes.

== Comparable cases ==
In May 2015, it was reported that Layla Qualls of Oklahoma looked as if she was 9 or 10 months old, but was 3 years old. She was among seven children worldwide with Syndrome X that are being studied by researchers at the University of California, Los Angeles. She died on January 7, 2020, at the age of 7.

In their ongoing research they found that the blood of Syndrome X children appears to age normally. Layla was also featured in a TLC documentary titled The Girls Who Don't Age. This documentary aired July 18, 2016, on TLC.

In July 2016, it was reported that Alyssa Pennington of New Mexico looks as if she is five years old, but is 12 years old. She is another Syndrome X case.

Another case that has been reported in July 2016 is Jenifer Sandoval of Colorado. Although she looks as if she is four years old, she is 22 years old.

Blood tissue from five other female Syndrome X cases (whose average age was 6.3 years) turned out to be age-appropriate according to a biomarker of aging known as epigenetic clock. The mean epigenetic age of the five pure Syndrome X subjects was 6.7 years (standard error = 1.0) which is not significantly different from the mean chronological age of 6.3 years (standard error = 1.8). Notably, the oldest pure Syndrome X case had an epigenetic age of 14.5 years which was 3.2 years older than her true chronological age. It is not yet known whether the epigenetic age of other tissues is also age appropriate in these cases.

== Neotenic complex syndrome ==
Blood samples from each of the "Syndrome X" girls were sent to Dr. Radoje Drmanac in San Francisco, who did a full genomic sequencing and found the common link shared by the girls, leading the syndrome to be renamed "neotenic complex syndrome".
