= Barry Bogin =

American anthropologist (born 1950)

Barry Bogin (born May 20, 1950) is an American physical anthropologist trained at Temple University who researches physical growth in Guatemalan Maya children, and is a theorist upon the evolutionary origins of human childhood. He is a professor at Loughborough University in the UK, after professorships at the University of Michigan-Dearborn, and Wayne State University. During 1974–1976, he was a visiting professor at the Universidad del Valle de Guatemala.

== Books ==
- Bogin, Barry (2001), Patterns of Human Growth (2nd ed.), Cambridge, UK & New York: Cambridge University Press, ISBN 0-521-56438-7First published 1988. Second edition published 1999, reprinted 2001
- The Family as an Environment for Human Development, edited with N. Wolanski (1996, Kamal Raj Publishers) ISBN 978-81-85264-13-4
- Human Biology: An Evolutionary and Biocultural Approach, edited with S. Stinson, R. Huss-Ashmore, & D. O'Rourke (2000, Wiley) ISBN 978-0-471-13746-7
- The Growth of Humanity (2001, Wiley) ISBN 978-0-471-35448-2
- Methods in Human Growth Research (2005)
