= Neotenic complex syndrome =

Congenital extreme form of developmental delay and neoteny

- Other names: Syndrome X
- Usual onset: Usually detected at or after age 3, but likely present at birth
- Causes: Possibly genetic (de novo mutations)
- Frequency: Extremely rare: fewer than 100 confirmed cases worldwide

Neotenic complex syndrome (NCS) is a possibly genetic syndrome that presents as an extreme form of developmental delay, with the defining characteristic being neoteny of the patient. It was named in 2017 by Dr. Richard F. Walker, who discovered several genes implicated in the syndrome.

Prior to 2015, when whole genome sequencing was used to identify some genes involved in NCS, the condition was labelled "Syndrome X" when it was first discovered in Brooke Greenberg. Thereafter, others with the developmental symptoms were sought out in order to find common genetic aberrations that could provide clues as to cause. To date, seven human females have been diagnosed with NCS. In five patients, coding de novo mutations were found in five different genes which fall into similar functional categories of transcription regulation and chromatin modification.

== Genetics ==
In most of the patients analyzed, researchers identified missense de novo mutations in a set of genes. Mutations in three of these genes (DDX3X, TLK2 and HDAC8) were shared with those found in databases of individuals with developmental delay or autism spectrum disorder. A mutation in one gene (TMEM63B) was identified in a large knockout mouse study as likely to result in disease in humans. In two patients, a small (~150 kb) non-coding region of chromosome X was discovered to have a rare haplotype. This region appears to have regulatory functions (histone acetylation and DNase I hypersensitivity) and is in close proximity to several genes (AP1S2, MRX59, MRXSF, MRXS21, MRXS5 and PGS) involved in intellectual disability. The fact that NCS has so far only been found in females may be by chance or may be due to the X linkage of some of the genes and regions potentially responsible for NCS, in which the lack of a healthy copy on a second X chromosome could render the disease lethal in males.

Whether or not these mutations contribute to NCS is unclear. Not enough research has been conducted, complicated by the rarity of the syndrome. Many genetic differences were noted to be insignificant, and the effects of mutations in some genes are currently beyond scientific understanding.

== History ==
An 1888 article in the newspaper The Diamond Drill of Crystal Falls, Michigan, describes a 17-year-old girl from Stockerau, Vienna, named Maria Schumann. Due to her condition (identified at the time as "microcephaly"), she had never outgrown the mental state or size of an infant, but was of "sound composition". She could not speak or chew, consumed only liquids and pulpy foods despite having all of her teeth, and often slept for 2 days and 2 nights at a time.

== Prominent cases ==
- Brooke Greenberg
