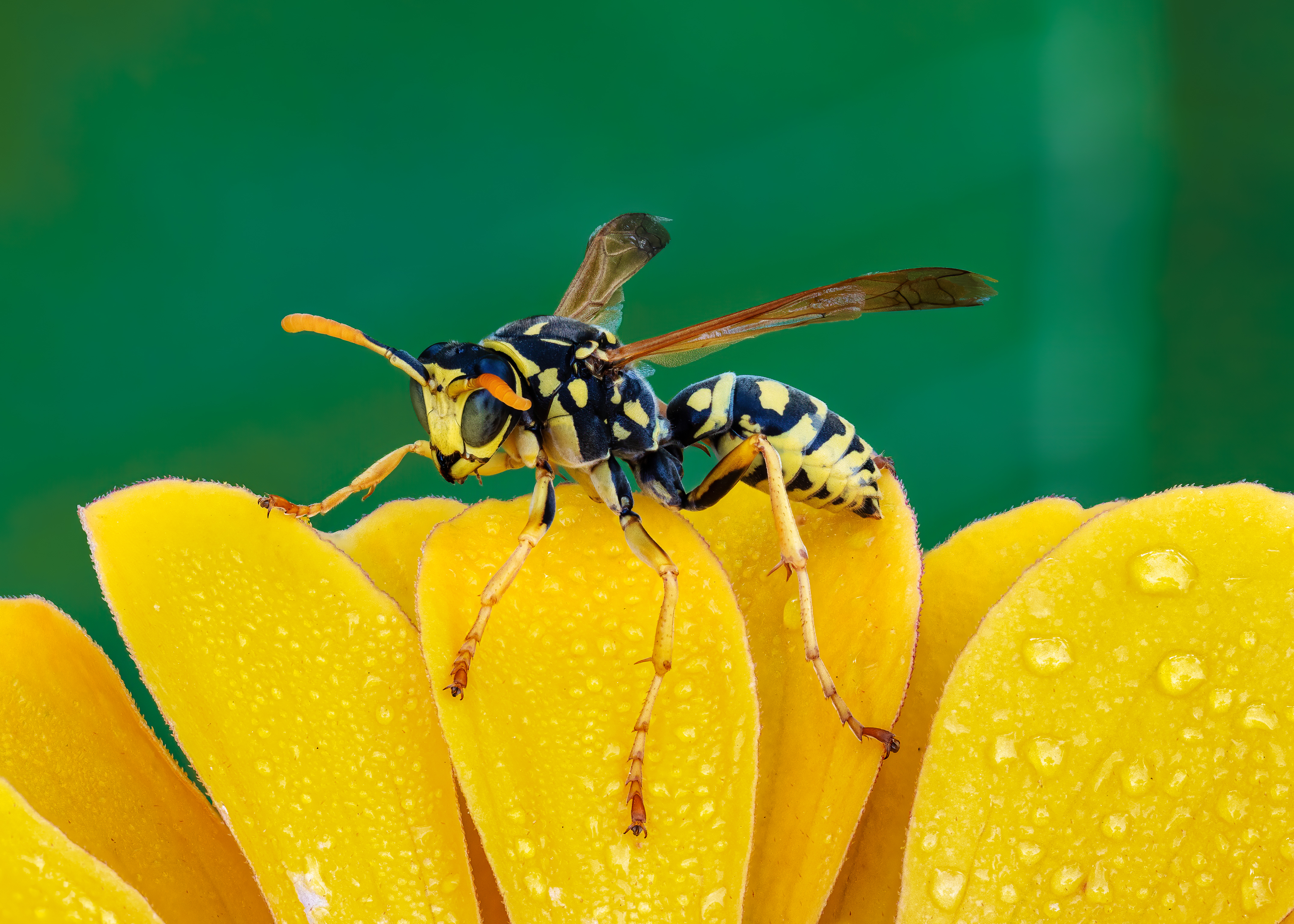
- Polistes gallicus male

Scientific classification
- Kingdom: Animalia
- Phylum: Arthropoda
- Clade: Pancrustacea
- Class: Insecta
- Order: Hymenoptera
- Family: Vespidae
- Subfamily: Polistinae
- Tribe: Polistini
- Genus: Polistes
- Species: P. gallicus

Binomial name
- Polistes gallicus (Linnaeus, 1767)
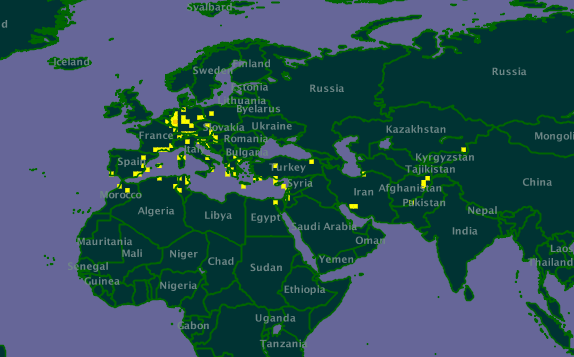
- Distribution of P. gallicus in yellow

Synonyms
- Polistes omissus (Weyrauch, 1938); Vespa gallica Linnaeus, 1767

= Polistes gallicus =

Species of wasp

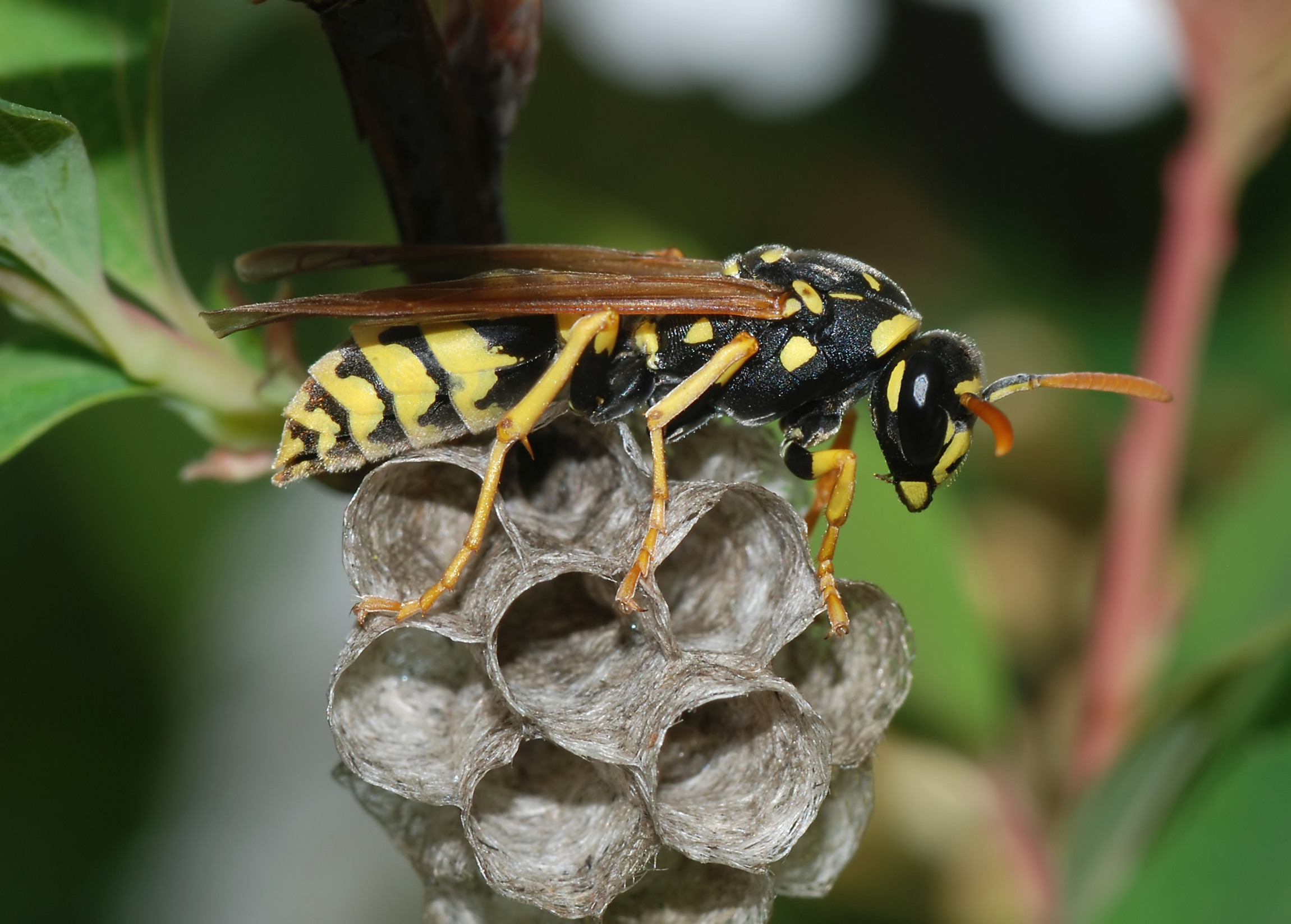
Polistes gallicus female

Polistes gallicus is a species of paper wasp found in various parts of Europe, excluding England, Denmark, and Scandinavia, from warmer climates to cooler regions north of the Alps. Nests of these social insects are created in these various conditions. The Polistes species use an oral secretion to construct their nests, which consist of a combination of saliva and chewed plant fibers. This structural mixture physically protects the nest from various harsh elements and from weathering over time.

== Description and identification ==
P. gallicus, like other members of the subgenus Polistes (Polistes), has recognizable, bright yellow and black markings. They have smaller bodies than many of its allies that overlap in range, and their bodies are largely hairless. The species may be separated from allies through the following traits.

Females are identified by having 12 antennal segments and 6 abdominal segments. The antennae are orange and paler on the ventral surface than in many allies and have yellow-marked scapes. The malar space is short, under 0.75 times the distance between the lateral ocelli, and is black. They have slender mandibles that are mostly colored black with an excentric yellow spot on each. In contrast, the clypeus is yellow and often with a small but distinct black spot or band. As in many species within the subgenus, the mesoscutum has a pair of developed spots. Both the spots on the propodeum and continuous band on the fourth abdominal sternite are wide. Unlike species such as P. dominula, P. gallicus has a mostly black hypopygium.

Males are identified by having 13 antennal segments and 7 abdominal segments. The head is roughly triangular as viewed from the front with a curved clypeus. The apical half of the antennae is entirely orange-yellow, and the final segment is slightly under twice as long as wide. The pronotum has a yellow band that widens toward the sides as well as short, straight hairs. The mesosternum is largely yellow, more so than in some allies. Both the mesoscutum and scutellum typically have distinct spots. The abdomen has the final sternite entirely black.

== Taxonomy and phylogeny ==
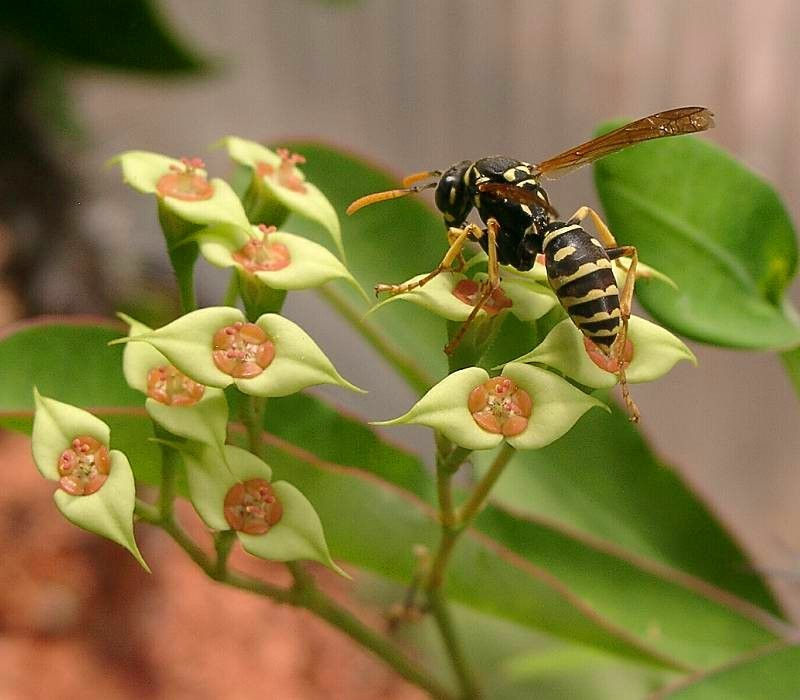
Polistes sp. visiting Euphorbia genoudiana

P. gallicus is a member of the family Vespidae, further classified under the Polistinae (the second-largest of the subfamilies), which consists of various social wasps. Within the larger subfamily Polistnae, Polistes species are categorized by their independent founding behavior, distinguishing them from swarm-founding species. Furthermore, P. gallicus is one of about 200 species of wasps in the genus Polistes.

P. gallicus is one of 27 members of the subgenus Polistes (Polistes), which are typically very similar black-and-yellow species. This similarity has resulted in taxonomic complications in older literature. For instance, many references prior to 1985 misapplied the name to the European paper wasp, P. dominula. In terms of coloration, P. gallicus typically has yellow spots on the mandibles as well as a black hypopygium whereas P. dominula has often entirely black mandibles and always a largely yellow hypopygium. Additionally, many published studies for which no vouchered reference specimens are available cannot be reliably assigned to either species. P. gallicus is also very closely related to P. biglumis and P. mongolicus, which are members of the same species group. The former synonyms, P. foederatus and P. mongolicus, were restored from synonymy following revision of the genus in 2017 and are considered as distinct species again.

== Distribution and habitat ==
The range of P. gallicus extends across much of Europe, where it is a common species. It can be found from northern Italy and southern Switzerland south into northwest Africa and east to Croatia and Corfu. The species inhabits a variety of climates and habitats throughout this range, although it more frequently nests in warm and dry regions, where its nests are built hanging in the open with the cells towards the ground. In cooler regions north of the Alps, its nests are often built in more protective enclosures such as in pipes or metal scraps. Reports of P. gallicus in the New World are the result of misidentification or incorrect synonymy and actually refer to Polistes dominulus.

== Colony cycle ==
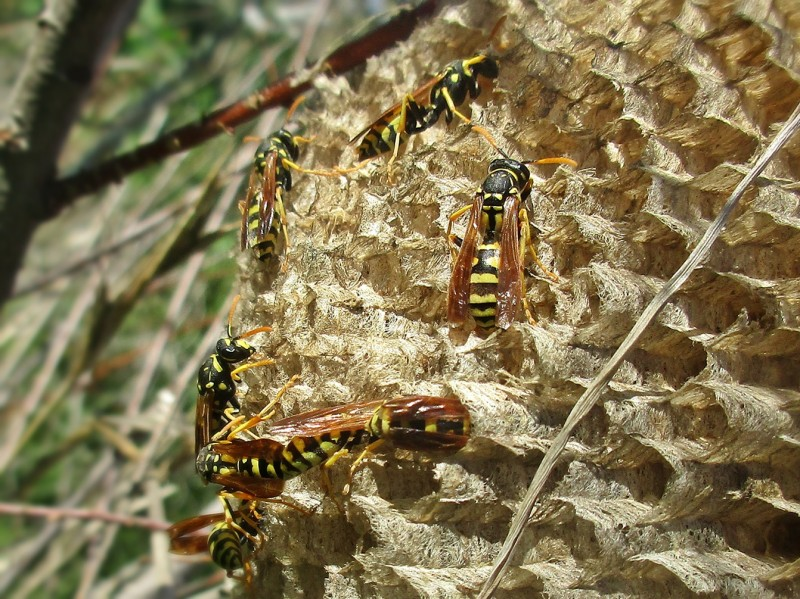
Polistes gallicus nest.

Fertile foundress wasps come out of hibernation in the spring around mid May and build a new nest combining oral secretions with plant fibers, such as from sticks and bush branches, to make a paper pulp. A nest will begin to be constructed by late May to early April. Most nests are built by a single foundress, though in southern regions of Germany and Italy, two or more foundresses have been recorded building a cooperative nest. Each cell is formed in a hexagonal structure and are attached to a surface by a single stalk. The foundress will then lay a single egg directly in each brood cell. After about 2 weeks, the eggs hatch into larvae and are fed chunks of caterpillars, developing through 5 instar stages before pupating by spinning a cocoon to enclose its cell. Metamorphosis takes about 10 to 14 days before a mature adult wasp emerges.

This first brood of each season emerges around May to early June and is exclusively female workers that tend to the nest as subordinates to the foundress. They help maintain the nest, tend to the brood by hunting, and defend the nest if it's threatened. The foundress can now focus her time on laying eggs. Beginning with the second brood, the larvae are able to be better fed by the early workers and emerge as bigger adults. The nest continues to grow into the summer months as more cells are needed for the brood. This summer brood takes a single month to mature. The size of the nest can reach as many as 500 to over 1000 cells in optimum conditions such as sheltered, warmer locations, though they are still smaller than in allied species of Polistes. Such nests may have hundreds of workers.

By around June to July, some of the eggs laid by the foundress are willingly unfertilized so, instead of developing into female workers will more quickly develop into males. The females that emerge from around July to August, instead of contributing to the nest, instead store fat and develop their ovaries to become future foundresses. With the next generation of foundresses developing, the nest tends to decline in activity. When the original foundress dies, some workers may begin laying unfertilized eggs which, if they manage to develop, will be males.

The males that are produced congregate in unisexual clusters not far from the nest until November. They then occasionally mate with the future foundresses from other nests. As winter approaches, the workers and then the males die out, leaving only the newly fertilized foundresses to hibernate overwinter, in various shelters, until the following spring to begin a new colony cycle. This can be as many as two dozen, or more, foundresses.

== Behavior ==
=== Diet ===
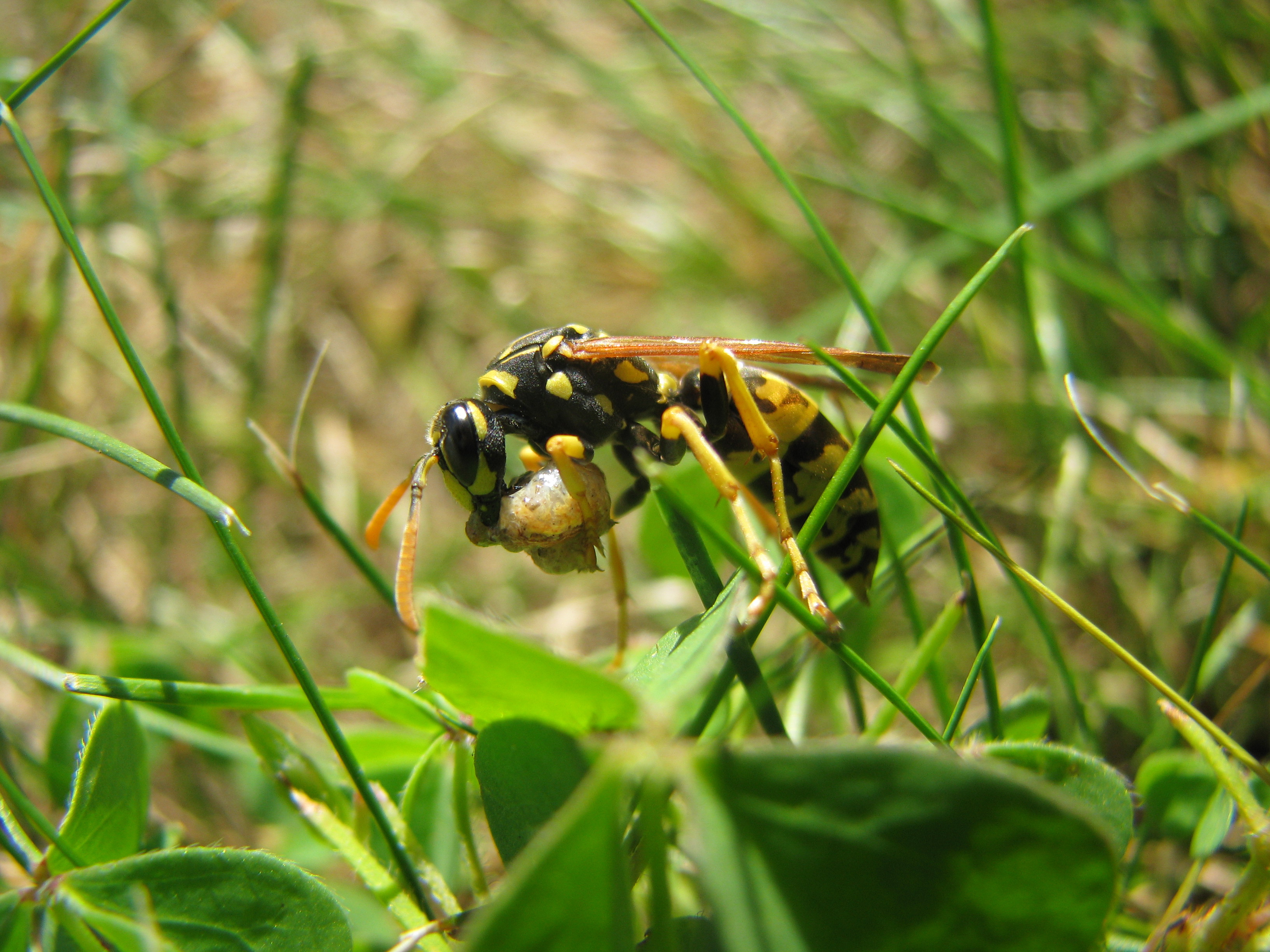
Paper wasp (Polistes dominula) chewing up a caterpillar

The wasp is omnivorous, feeding on fruits, flower's nectar, insects, snails, or larger animals' corpses. It feeds its brood after visiting numerous flowers, collecting nectar in addition to feeding them. Due to its dimensions, this species is suspected to transfer pollen to the stigma from its mostly hairless bodies, resulting in few to no pollen grains remaining on the body after foraging.

=== Dominance hierarchy ===
Hormones play a role in the establishment of dominance hierarchies among P. gallicus. Dominant females tend to have more developed ovaries due to higher activity levels in their endocrine systems. A larger corpora allata also influences the determination of dominance. A higher reproductive capacity is indicative of the dominant female.

=== Reproductive suppression ===
After a hierarchy is established, the dominant wasp remains the sole reproducer in the colony due to the inhibition of endocrine activity within the subordinate wasps. Various factors contribute to the possibility of inhibition, which might also lead to differences in endocrine activity. If subordinates happen to lay eggs after the hierarchy is formed, the dominant foundress will recognize and eat the eggs to ensure all laid eggs are of her own lineage.

=== Kin recognition and conflict ===
P. gallicus recognize their kin through Van der Vecht's gland secretions (VVS), which include a mixture of hydrocarbons that differ both between colonies and between the foundresses versus workers of a single colony. Workers can thus distinguish these differences, both to recognize their own foundress and to recognize wasps from another colony. In the case of alien wasps, workers may respond to these VVS with varying degrees of aggressiveness. Foundresses are also hypothesized to use peak activity in this organ as a repellant to defend the nest before it is populated. These VVS deposits on the nest may additionally indicate ownership to the queen and can inhibit ovarian development in the workers within the colony to prevent competition.

Colonies of P. gallicus typically have one foundress that produces offspring, though all females, including workers, are capable of producing male offspring. This creates a trade-off in terms of reproductive activity between the foundress and her workers. The relatedness of a foundress to her son is 1/2 as compared to a worker to her brother of 1/4. In the case of a foundress that only mated once, a worker's relatedness to a fellow worker's male offspring is 3/8. This closer relatedness to the workers means that workers may favor handling male production instead of the foundress. However, in the case of a foundress that mated more than once, the workers relatedness to a male produced by the foundress instead will be less than that of fellow workers. Because workers favor situations where the male brood are more closely related to them, workers may attempt to prevent other workers from laying eggs if the foundress has mated more than once.

As different colonies may have differences in the relatedness of workers, conflict over sex ratio arises. Fisher's theory of equal investment supports that a colony with a 50:50 sex ratio is the most beneficial due to both males and females having the same expected reproductive success. In colonies with an active foundress, workers may not produce male offspring of their own if it means a healthier colony. Additionally, a foundress may eat the eggs laid by workers to maintain balance if she was unable to prevent workers from laying eggs in the first place. The reverse is expected to occur as well. Indirect evidence also supports the occurrence matricide within colonies, and queen death is noted to be high in P. gallicus.

== Interaction with other species ==
=== Predators ===
Ants are a major threat to colonies prior to the emergence of the first workers. Members of the genera Tapinoma, Pheidole, and Tetramorium are known to be able to decimate a young nest. These ants feed on both larvae and pupae. Advanced predation may result in a foundress having to begin a new nest from scratch or otherwise usurp the nest of another foundress. If there are already workers at the time, the colony swarms to a nearby point to being a new nest or, if there are many workers, the colony may split up to form several smaller nests. However, only the fertile foundress will produce female offspring to complete the colony cycle, and secondary nests will only produce male offspring. If one of the secondary nests is lost, such as to predation, its workers will instead rejoin a sister colony instead of trying to start a colony from scratch for a third time.

=== Parasites ===
Strepsipterans belonging to the genus Xenos are known to infect and parasitize the genus Polistes, with Xenos vesparum especially documented in P. gallicus. Young members of the colony are particularly susceptible while within the brood cell, in contrast to adults that have departed their cell. These Xenos parasites are most visible in pupae and neotenic adults, though may affect all live stages. When parasites have higher prevalence, individual brood members of a nest also tend to be hosts to multiple Xenos parasites. They tend to infect these wasps either through phoretic transport. Here, the parasite's first instar larvae are able to attach to wasps’ abdomens at flowering patches or by infecting masses by releasing close to combs from an infected wasp. Sometimes in brood with high levels of parasitized larval hosts, an adaptation of the parasite to enter the eggs might exist.

=== Defense ===
Polistes species are known to use stings and venom as a means of colony defense. However, this venom seems to be costly to produce as they only release it after the sting in certain situations. Dangerous stimuli must first be perceived before they go out of their way, leaving a nest unattended, to attack. In some situations, P. gallicus is known to exhibit aggressive behavior to wasps of a foreign colony. While venom from a basic standpoint is used by solitary species to capture prey, it has served a greater purpose of defense in social colonies against colony vertebrate and invertebrate offenders.

When it comes to alarm systems, Polistes species can communicate with others through vibrational and visual signals. It might actually be beneficial for a smaller colony of wasps to switch from alarm pheromones, common with these wasps, to these alternative signals when the colony grows in size. Alarm pheromones mixed with the composition of the venom can also be released. However, if this release occurs following the act of ejecting venom by the signaling wasps or if it is due to the actual release of the venom during the sting has yet to be determined .

== Human importance ==
Knowing venom chemistry from these species of wasps can lead to human advantages for pharmaceuticals. The chemical breakdown of venom allows for synthesis in immunology therapy due to the creation of more reliable and effective treatments for people with allergies. Studies which analyzed the way venom interacts with victims provided a mechanism for drugs to permeate cell membranes. Further studies on wasps could provide a mechanism to control overpopulation through the creation of artificial sex attractants.

Allergic reaction-induced IgE-mediated anaphylaxis is commonly a result of hymenopteran stings. The composition of venom from a sting can even affect the types of treatment a patient should be given. Differences have been found between the composition of American and European Polistes venoms. Response to different epitope spectrums depends on the type of Polistes that did the stinging. P. gallicus venom was found to be a combination of four major allergens: Ag5 (antigen 5), hyaluronidase, phospholipase, and protease. This discovery has led to the addition of these allergens into a standard Polistes mix containing venom from North American species to improve diagnosis and therapy for European patients with Polistes allergies.
