= Trilobite (disambiguation) =

A trilobite is a type of extinct marine arthropod.

Trilobite or Trilobites also may refer to:

- Trilobites (genus), an obsolete genus of the arthropods
- Trilobite: Witness to Evolution (2001), book by Richard Fortey
- Electrolux Trilobite, robot vacuum cleaner
- Trilobyte, computer game developer
- The Trilobites, Australian rock band

== See also ==
- Terabyte
- Trilobite beetle (Platerodrilus), an insect
- Trilobite larva, a juvenile stage in certain invertebrates
