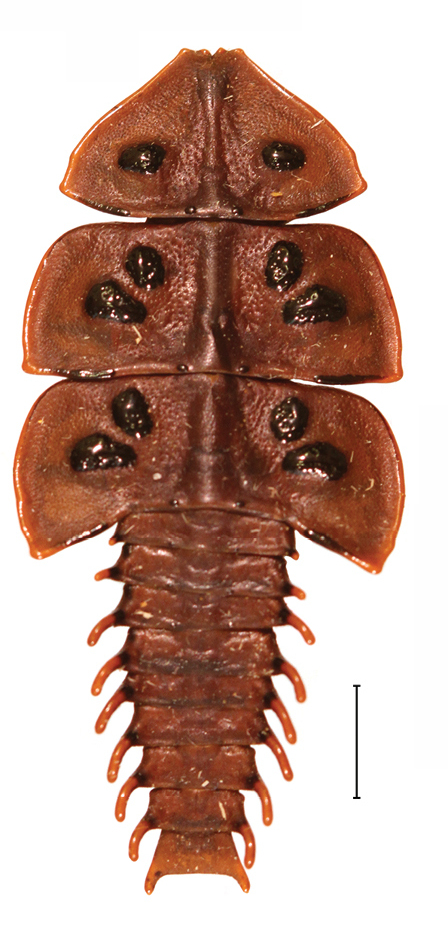
- larva

Scientific classification
- Kingdom: Animalia
- Phylum: Arthropoda
- Class: Insecta
- Order: Coleoptera
- Suborder: Polyphaga
- Infraorder: Elateriformia
- Family: Lycidae
- Tribe: Duliticolini
- Genus: Platerodrilus
- Species: P. ruficollis

Binomial name
- Platerodrilus ruficollis (Pic, 1942)

Synonyms
- Falsocalochromus ruficollis Pic, 1942; Duliticola hoiseni Wong, 1996

= Platerodrilus ruficollis =

Species of beetle

Platerodrilus ruficollis is a species of trilobite beetle found in Maritime Southeast Asia, also known by its junior synonym, Duliticola hoiseni.
