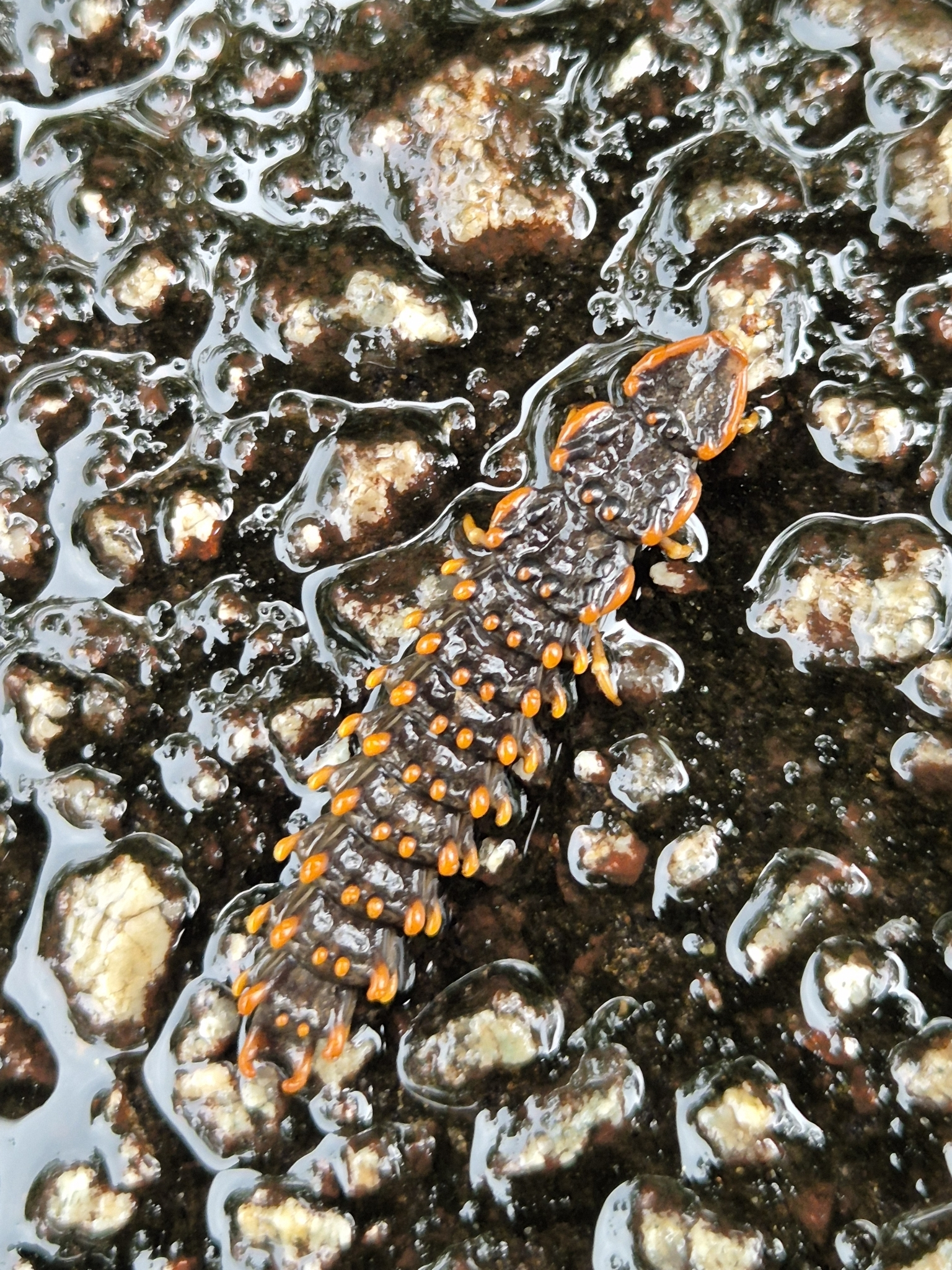
- Female

Scientific classification
- Kingdom: Animalia
- Phylum: Arthropoda
- Class: Insecta
- Order: Coleoptera
- Suborder: Polyphaga
- Infraorder: Elateriformia
- Family: Lycidae
- Genus: Platerodrilus
- Species: P. ngi

Binomial name
- Platerodrilus ngi Bocak & Masek, 2014

= Platerodrilus ngi =

Species of beetle

Platerodrilus ngi is a species of net-winged beetle (Lycidae), which, as with other members of the genus, is considered a trilobite beetle. This common name refers to the larviform female's supposed resemblance to the extinct trilobites; in contrast, male trilobite beetles appear similar to other Lycids, being an extreme example of sexual dimorphism.

P. ngi was described in 2014 on the basis of a specimen collected in Singapore (the holotype) along with a number of other specimens from both Singapore and Pahang, Malaysia. The holotype, a male, was recovered from the Bukit Timah and Central Water Catchment locality. Morphological comparisons found P. ngi to belong in the same clade with P. major, and thus belongs within its species group.

Platerodrilus ngi is diagnosed by dark red coloration present on the pronotum and the "humeral two thirds of [its] elytra" which is distinct from another species in the same species group, P. atronotatus. Additional differences in the antennomeres and phallus further differentiate the two species. The male is 6.9 mm (0.27 in) and covered in "dense short pubescence" (setae), while females reach 30.2 mm (1.19 in) long. Females with "distended" abdomens may be gravid, though this has not been confirmed.

The specific name honors Peter Ng.

The diet of Platerodrilus is thought to consist of materials found within their preferred habitat within rotting wood, which may include fungi such as basidiomycetes, slime molds, rotifers, nematodes, copepods, nauplii, and mites, along with the rotting wood itself. P. ngi may be somewhat adaptable as specimens were found in secondary forests within the Central Catchment Nature Reserve, while other species were only found in primary forests.
