= Neoteny =

Retaining juvenile features into adulthood

Neoteny (/niˈɒtəni/), also called juvenilization, is the delaying or slowing of the physiological or somatic development of an organism, typically an animal. Neoteny in modern humans is more significant than in other primates. In progenesis or paedogenesis, sexual development is accelerated.

Both neoteny and progenesis result in paedomorphism (as having the form typical of children) or paedomorphosis (changing towards forms typical of children), a type of heterochrony. It is the retention in adults of traits previously seen only in the young. Such retention is important in evolutionary biology, domestication, and evolutionary developmental biology. Some authors define paedomorphism as the retention of larval traits, as seen in salamanders.

== History and etymology ==
Diagram of the six types of shift in heterochrony, a change in the timing or rate of any process in embryonic development. Predisplacement, hypermorphosis, and acceleration (red) extend development (peramorphosis); postdisplacement, hypomorphosis, and deceleration (blue) all truncate it (paedomorphosis).

Julius Kollmann created the term "neoteny" in 1885 after he described the axolotl's maturation while remaining in a tadpole-like aquatic stage complete with gills, unlike other adult amphibians like frogs and toads.

The word neoteny is borrowed from the German Neotenie, the latter constructed by Kollmann from the Greek νέος (neos, "young") and τείνειν (teínein, "to stretch, to extend"). The adjective is either "neotenic" or "neotenous". For the opposite of "neotenic", different authorities use either "gerontomorphic" or "peramorphic". Bogin points out that Kollmann had intended the meaning to be "retaining youth", but had evidently confused the Greek teínein with the Latin tenere, which had the meaning he wanted, "to retain", so that the new word would mean "the retaining of youth (into adulthood)".

In 1926, Louis Bolk described neoteny as the major process in humanization. In his 1977 book Ontogeny and Phylogeny, Stephen Jay Gould noted that Bolk's account constituted an attempted justification for "scientific" racism and sexism, but acknowledged that Bolk had been right in the core idea that humans differ from other primates in becoming sexually mature in an infantile stage of body development.

== In humans ==
Neoteny in humans is the slowing or delaying of body development, compared to non-human primates, resulting in features such as a large head, a flat face, and relatively short arms. These neotenic changes may have been brought about by sexual selection in human evolution. In turn, they may have permitted the development of human capacities such as emotional communication. Some evolutionary theorists have proposed that neoteny was a key feature in human evolution. J. B. S. Haldane states a "major evolutionary trend in human beings" is "greater prolongation of childhood and retardation of maturity." Delbert D. Thiessen said that "neoteny becomes more apparent as early primates evolved into later forms" and that primates have been "evolving toward flat face." Doug Jones argued that human evolution's trend toward neoteny may have been caused by sexual selection in human evolution for neotenous facial traits in women by men with the resulting neoteny in male faces being a "by-product" of sexual selection for neotenous female faces.

== In domestic animals ==
Neoteny is seen in domesticated animals such as dogs and mice. This is because there are more resources available, less competition for those resources, and with the lowered competition the animals expend less energy obtaining those resources. This allows them to mature and reproduce more quickly than their wild counterparts. The environment that domesticated animals are raised in determines whether or not neoteny is present in them. Evolutionary neoteny can arise when those conditions occur, and a species becomes sexually mature ahead of its "normal development". Another explanation for neoteny in domesticated animals is selection for behavioral characteristics. Behavior is linked to genetics, which means that when a behavioral trait is selected for, a physical trait may be selected for due to mechanisms like linkage disequilibrium. Often, juvenile behaviors are selected for to more easily domesticate a species; aggressiveness often comes with adulthood when there is a need to compete for resources. Traits that may become neotenized due to decreased aggression may be a shorter muzzle and smaller size. Common neotenous physical traits in domesticated animals (mainly rabbits, dogs, pigs, ferrets, and cats) include floppy ears, changes in the reproductive cycle, curly tails, piebald coloration, fewer or shortened vertebra, large eyes, rounded forehead, large ears, and shortened muzzle.

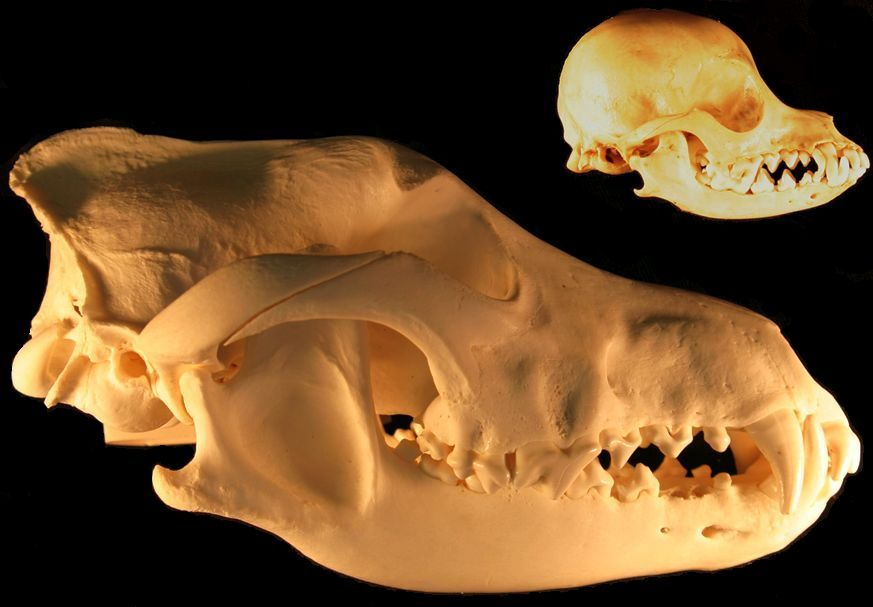
Neoteny and reduction in skull size – grey wolf and chihuahua skulls

When the role of dogs expanded from just being working dogs to include companions, humans started selectively breeding dogs for morphological neoteny, which "strengthened the human-canine bond." Humans bred dogs to have more "juvenile physical traits" as adults, such as short snouts and wide-set eyes which are associated with puppies because people usually consider these traits to be more attractive. Some breeds of dogs with short snouts and broad heads such as the Komondor, Saint Bernard and Maremma Sheepdog are more morphologically neotenous than other breeds of dogs. Cavalier King Charles Spaniels are an example of selection for neoteny because they exhibit large eyes, pendant-shaped ears and compact feet, giving them a morphology similar to puppies as adults.

In 2004, a study that used 310 wolf skulls and over 700 dog skulls representing 100 breeds concluded that the evolution of dog skulls can generally not be described by heterochronic processes such as neoteny, although some pedomorphic dog breeds have skulls that resemble the skulls of juvenile wolves. By 2011, the findings by the same researcher were simply "Dogs are not paedomorphic wolves."

== In other animals ==
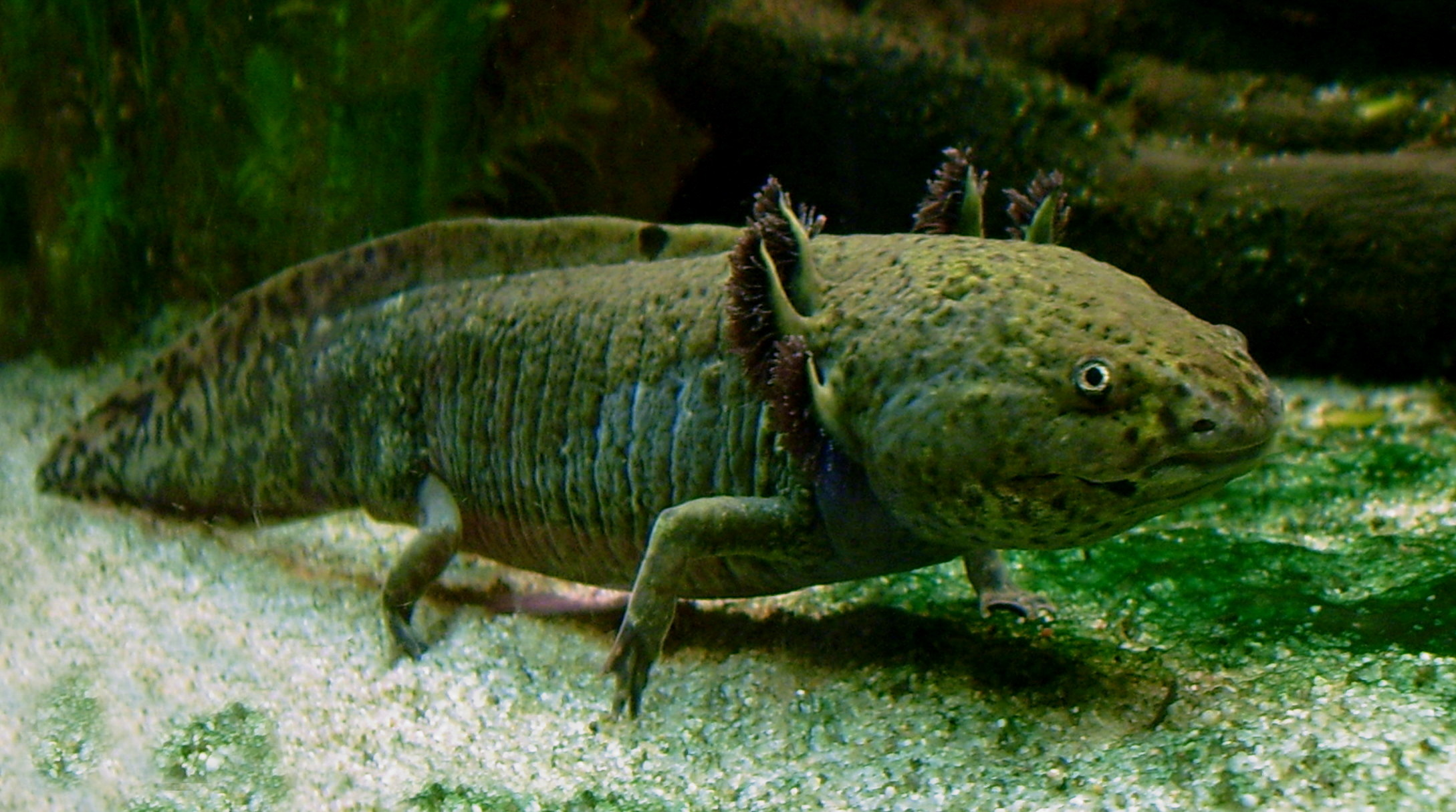
The axolotl (Ambystoma mexicanum) is a neotenous salamander, often retaining gills throughout its life.

Partial neoteny, as in the frog Lithobates clamitans, is the retention of the larval form beyond the usual age of maturation, with possible sexual development (progenesis) and eventual maturation into the adult form. Full neoteny is seen in Ambystoma mexicanum (the axolotl) and some populations of tiger salamander (Ambystoma tigrinum), which remain in larval form throughout their lives.

Neoteny is an ancient, pervasive phenomenon: in urodeles, many extant taxa are neotenic, and both morphological and histological data suggest that the Middle Jurassic taxon Marmorerpeton was neotenic.

Two environments which favor neoteny are high altitudes and cool temperatures, because neotenous individuals have more fitness than individuals which metamorphose into an adult form. The energy required for metamorphosis detracts from individual fitness, and neotenous individuals can utilize available resources more easily. This trend is seen in a comparison of salamander species at lower and higher altitudes; in a cool, high-altitude environment, neotenous individuals survive more and are more fecund than those which metamorphose into adult form. Insects in cooler environments tend to exhibit neoteny in flight because wings have a high surface area and lose heat quickly; in those habitats, it is disadvantageous for insects to metamorphose into adults.

=== Amphibians ===
Many species of salamander, and other amphibians, are environmentally neotenous. Axolotl and olm retain their gills and juvenile aquatic form throughout adulthood, in full neoteny. Gills which are kept after maturation are a common juvenile characteristic in amphibians, such as the tiger salamander and rough-skinned newt.

Lithobates clamitans is partially neotenous, delaying maturation during the winter as fewer resources are available, and it can find resources more easily in its larval form. This encompasses both of the main causes of neoteny; the energy required to survive in the winter as a newly-formed adult is too great, so the organism exhibits neotenous characteristics until it can better survive as an adult.

Many species of mole salamander are neotenous. In the northwestern salamander (Ambystoma gracile), high altitude is the environmental cause of neoteny.

Neoteny occurs in all salamander families. It seems to be a survival mechanism in environments with little iodine. In these circumstances, salamanders can reproduce and survive in the form of a smaller larval stage, which is aquatic and requires less food compared to terrestrial adults. If salamander larvae ingest a sufficient amount of iodine, they quickly metamorphose, gaining the ability to disperse across dry land.

=== Arthropods ===
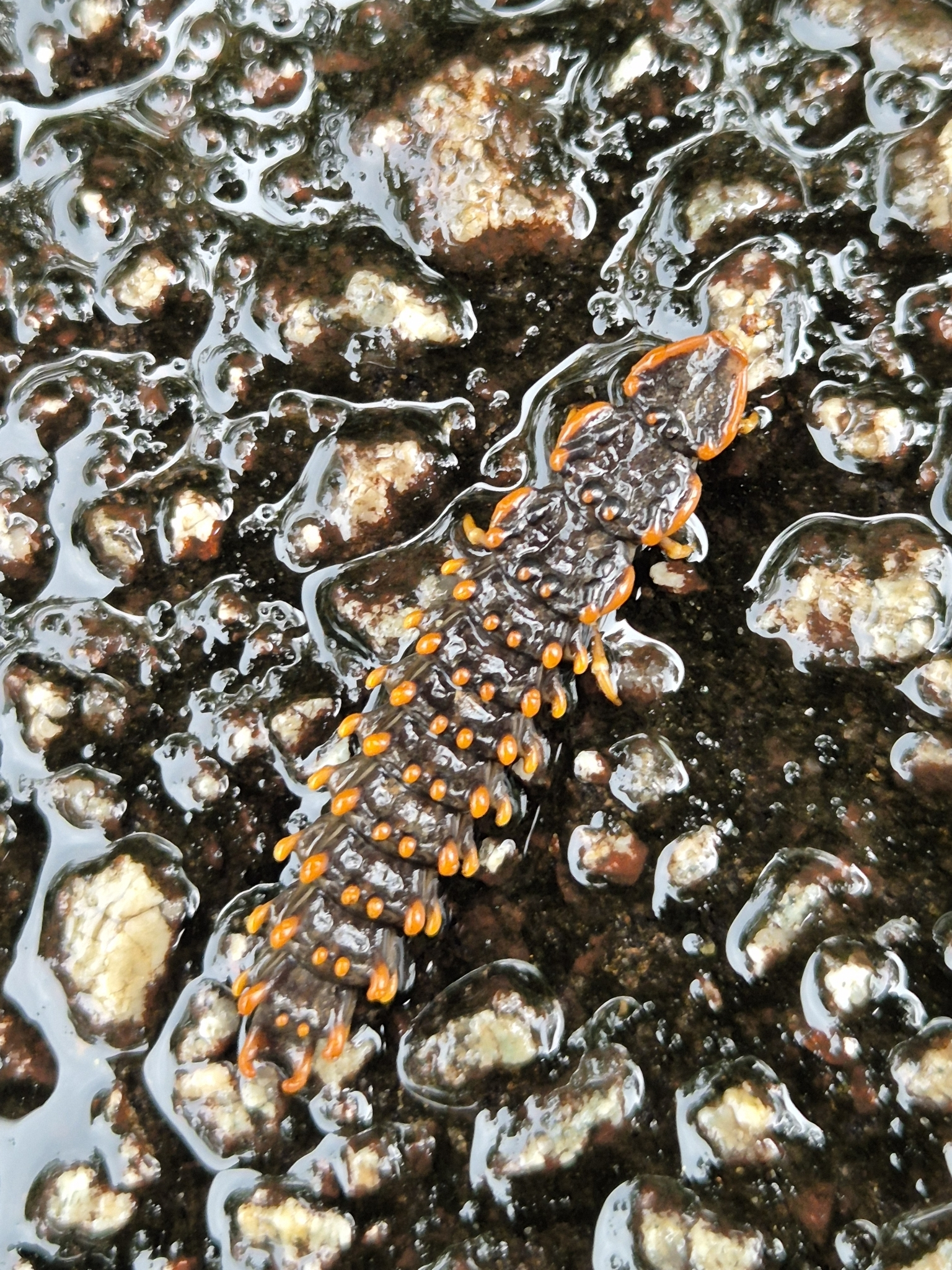
Trilobite beetles (Platerodrilus ngi pictured) are a genus of beetles with larviform females.

Neoteny is commonly seen in flightless insects, such as the females of the order Strepsiptera. Flightlessness in insects has evolved separately a number of times; factors which may have contributed to the separate evolution of flightlessness are high altitude, geographic isolation (islands), and low temperatures. Under these environmental conditions, dispersal would be disadvantageous; heat is lost more rapidly through wings in colder climates. The females of certain insect groups become sexually mature without metamorphosis, and some do not develop wings; these are termed larviform females. Flightlessness in some female insects has been linked to higher fecundity. Aphids are an example of insects which may never develop wings, depending on their environment. If resources are abundant on a host plant, there is no need to grow wings and disperse. If resources become diminished, their offspring may develop wings to disperse to other host plants.

In some groups, such as the insect families Gerridae, Delphacidae and Carabidae, energy costs result in neoteny; many species in these families have small, neotenous wings or none at all. Some cricket species shed their wings in adulthood; in the genus Ozopemon, males (thought to be the first example of neoteny in beetles) are significantly smaller than females due to inbreeding. In the termite Kalotermes flavicollis, neoteny is seen in molting females.

Neoteny is also found in a few species of the isopod family Ischnomesidae, which live in the deep ocean.

=== Amniotes ===
Several birds, such as the manakins Chiroxiphia linearis and Chiroxiphia caudata, exhibit partial neoteny. The males of both species retain juvenile plumage into adulthood, losing it when they are fully mature.

Bonobos share many physical characteristics with humans, including neotenous skulls. The shape of their skull does not change into adulthood (only increasing in size), due to sexual dimorphism and an evolutionary change in the timing of development.

== Subcellular neoteny ==
Neoteny is usually used to describe animal development; however, neoteny is also seen in the cell organelles. It was suggested that subcellular neoteny could explain why sperm cells have atypical centrioles. One of the two sperm centrioles of fruit fly exhibit the retention of "juvenile" centriole structure, which can be described as centriolar "neoteny". This neotenic, atypical centriole is known as the Proximal Centriole-Like. Typical centrioles form via a step by step process in which a cartwheel forms, then develops to become a procentriole, and further matures into a centriole. The neotenic centriole of fruit fly resembles an early procentriole.

== See also ==
- Ageing
- Cuteness
- Kawaii
- Larviform female
- Moe (slang)
- Neotenic complex syndrome
- Neotenin
- Rejuvenation
