= Paraxenos =

Scientific classification
- Kingdom: Animalia
- Phylum: Arthropoda
- Clade: Pancrustacea
- Class: Insecta
- Order: Strepsiptera
- Family: Xenidae
- Genus: Paraxenos; Saunders, 1872

Genus of insect

Paraxenos is a genus of insects in the family Xenidae (Order: Strepsiptera) with 14 species. The genus Paraxenos is defined as having males with four antennal segments, a thin sclerotized prementum separate from the mouthfield sclerites, a relatively wide postfrons not separated from the vertex plates, and a hindwing with a CuP vein.. All known Paraxenos species parasitize wasps in the family Bembicidae. The type species is Paraxenos erberi.

== Distribution ==
This genus is found in Eurasia, Africa, and Australasia, owing to the distribution of bembicid wasps, its hosts. It is likely found in even more places than is known from specimens as insects in this order are notoriously cryptic and difficult to identify. Countries with known specimens include Algeria, Australia, Cyprus, Czech Republic, Democratic Republic of the Congo, Egypt, Germany, Greece, Hungary, India, Italy, Japan, Jordan, Mali, Mongolia, New Guinea, Senegal, Spain, Sri Lanka, and Tajikistan. Many species formerly considered to be in Paraxenos are found worldwide, wherever there are sphecid wasps.

== Taxonomic history ==
First described in 1872 by Sydney S. Saunders as a member of Stylopidae (now divided into multiple families) as “Antennal branches distorted, swollen, compressed; 3rd joint prominent at basal elbow, rectangularly recurved; apex obtuse. Wing nerves insulated on both sides, duplicated” (written originally in Latin). At the time, he described four species: Paraxenos erberi, P. corcyricus, P. sieboldii (synonymous with Xenos sphecidarum), and P. westwoodii. The type species is P. erberi. It is now considered a member of the family Xenidae separate from Stylopidae. Several other genera were formerly considered separate but are now in Paraxenos: Eupathocera, Ophthalmochlus, Homilops, Sceliphronechthrus, Tachytixenos, and Isodontiaphila. Historically considered sister to the genera Pseudoxenos and Xenos, genetic studies showed Paraxenos to be polyphyletic and scattered across the phylogeny of Xenidae. As a result, a number of species were moved to other genera and some were placed into entirely new genera, such as Tuberoxenos. It was previously thought that Strepsiptera largely co-evolved with their hosts, but phylogenetic studies have revealed a significant amount of host-switching and thus a reconsideration of the relationships of the genera within Xenidae was necessary. The family as a whole evolved approximately 54 million years ago. The basal clade of Xenidae, containing the first Paraxenos group of species, is approximately 41 million years old and of Palearctic origin.

== Species list ==
Cook provides a list of all known hosts for Paraxenos in his 2019 catalog. Due to the polyphyly of this genus, Benda et al. proposed a new set of classifications for these. As such, a second list of species formerly in this genus is provided below. There are currently 14 recognized species in Paraxenos:

- Paraxenos araibicus (Benda et al. 2023)
- Paraxenos australiensis (Kifune & Hirashima 1987)
- Paraxenos beaumonti (Pasteels 1951)
- Paraxenos biroi (Székessy 1956)
- Paraxenos erberi (Saunders 1872)
- Paraxenos hofenederi (Pasteels 1956)
- Paraxenos hofenederianus (Luna de Carvalho 1978)
- Paraxenos hungaricus (Székessy 1955)
- Paraxenos krombeini (Kifune & Hirashima 1987)
- Paraxenos nagatomii (Kifune 1985)
- Paraxenos novaeguineae (Székessy 1956)
- Paraxenos occidentalis (Kifune & Hirashima 1987)
- Paraxenos polli (Pasteels 1956)
- Paraxenos rieki (Pasteels 1956)

Species formerly in Paraxenos:

- Tachytixenos indicus: formerly Paraxenos indicus
- Eupathocera argentina: formerly Paraxenos argentinus
- Eupathocera auripedis: formerly Paraxenos auripedis
- Eupathocera bucki: formerly Paraxenos bucki
- Eupathocera duryi: formerly Paraxenos duryi
- Eupathocera fasciati: formerly Paraxenos fasciati
- Eupathocera fuliginosi: formerly Paraxenos fuliginosi
- Eupathocera inclusa: formerly Paraxenos inclusus
- Eupathocera luctuosae: formerly Paraxenos luctuosae
- Eupathocera lugubris: formerly Paraxenos lugubris
- Eupathocera mendozae: formerly Paraxenos mendozae
- Eupathocera piercei: formerly Paraxenos piercei
- Eupathocera striati: formerly Paraxenos striati
- Eupathocera taschenbergi: formerly Paraxenos taschenbergi
- Eupathocera westwoodii: formerly Paraxenos westwoodii
- Sphecixenos abbotti: formerly Paraxenos abbotti
- Sphecixenos astrolabensis: formerly Paraxenos astrolabensis
- Sphecixenos dorae: formerly Paraxenos dorae
- Sphecixenos erimae: formerly Paraxenos erimae
- Sphecixenos esakii: formerly Paraxenos esakii
- Sphecixenos gigas: formerly Paraxenos gigas
- Sphecixenos kurosawai: formerly Paraxenos kurosawai
- Sphecixenos laetus: formerly Paraxenos laetum
- Sphecixenos orientalis: formerly Paraxenos orientalis
- Sphecixenos reticulatus: formerly Paraxenos reticulatus
- Sphecixenos simplex: formerly Paraxenos simplex
- Sphecixenos vanderiisti: formerly Paraxenos vanderiisti
- Pseudoxenos corcyricus: formerly Paraxenos corcyricus
- Tuberoxenos altozambeziensis: formerly Paraxenos altozambeziensis
- Tuberoxenos sinuatus: formerly Paraxenos sinuatus
- Tuberoxenos sphecidarum: formerly Paraxenos sphecidarum
- Tuberoxenos teres: formerly Paraxenos teres
- Tuberoxenos tibetanus: formerly Paraxenos tibetanus
- Paraxenos crassidens: synonymized with Paraxenos erberi

== Biology ==
=== Reproduction ===
All Paraxenos parasitize wasps in the family Bembicidae, and like all Strepsiptera, are obligate parasites. The females remain inside their host’s body until they die and males emerge as free-flying adults to find and inseminate a female. Like many other Strepsiptera, Paraxenos mate by traumatic insemination, in which the male inserts sperm directly into the body of the female by piercing her integument with his penis, although some evidence suggests they may mate by brood canal insemination. In Paraxenos erberi, the male penis is hook-shaped and lacks spines and the female lacks a paragenital organ. The male possesses long, fine, spatulate microtrichia on his tarsomeres in order to adhere to the female during copulation. The larvae emerge mobile (often called planidia in this mobile stage) and must find a host to complete their life cycle. In Paraxenos lugubris (now Eupathocera lugubris), the larvae can only infect wasps in their vulnerable larval stage. In this case, the adult wasps carry the parasites to their offspring (known as vertical transmission) after picking them up on a flower without being infected themselves. Infected individuals (those infected as young) are sterile and do not invest in offspring care at all, instead spending the majority of their time drinking nectar, allowing the Paraxenos lugubris (now Eupathocera lugubris) larvae to jump on to flowers and be transmitted to another adult wasp. The larger the host, the larger the eggs laid by the female and the larger the female. The number of eggs depends on the gregariousness and foraging behavior of the host; females tend to lay fewer eggs when their species’ hosts are more gregarious and more frequent flower-visitors.

=== Host species list ===
A list of hosts parasitized by Paraxenos sp. and species formerly in Paraxenos before 2019 is provided below.

- Sphecixenos abbotti, host: Sphex sp.
- Tuberoxenos altozambeziensis, host: Ammophila sp.
- Paraxenos arabicus, host: Bembix kohli
- Eupathocera argentina, host: Prionyx thomae
- Paraxenos astrolabensis, host: Sphex cognatus
- Eupathocera auripedis, host: Isodontia auripes
- Paraxenos australiensis, host: Bembix musca
- Paraxenos beaumonti, host: Stizus marthae
- Eupathocera bucki, host: Ammophila sp.
- Paraxenos biroi, host: Bembecinus antipodum
- Pseudoxenos corcyricus, host: Odynerus spinipes
- Paraxenos crassidens, host: Bembecinus tridens
- Sphecixenos dorae, host: Sphex nigrohirtum
- Eupathocera duryi, host: Prionyx atratus
- Paraxenos erberi, hosts: Bembecinus hungaricus, Bembecinus peregrinus, Bembecinus tridens, Bembecinus sp., Stizus marthae
- Sphecixenos erimae, host: Sphex fumicatus
- Sphecixenos esakii, hosts: Isodontia nigella, Isodontia maidli
- Eupathocera fasciati, host: Sceliphron fasciatum
- Eupathocera fuliginosi, host: Sphex servillei
- Sphecixenos gigas, host: Sphex schoutedeni
- Paraxenos hofenederi, hosts: Stizus biclypeatus, Stizus ruficornis, Stizus rufiventris
- Paraxenos hofenederianus, host: Stizus distinguendus
- Paraxenos hungaricus, hosts: Bembex oculata, Bembex rostrata
- Eupathocera inclusa, host: Ammophila sp.
- Tachytixenos indicus, host: Tachyetes xenoferus, Tachyetes maculicornis, Tachyetes modestus, Tachyetes vischnu
- Paraxenos krombeini, host: Bembix orientalis
- Sphecixenos kurosawai, host: Sphex madasummae
- Sphecixenos laetus, host: Sceliphron laetum
- Eupathocera luctuosae, host: Sphex luctuosus
- Eupathocera lugubris, hosts: Ammophila extremitata, Ammophila gracilis, Ammophila pruinosa, Ammophila kennedyi, Ammophila fernaldi, Ammophila aberti, Ammophila nasalis, Ammophila breviceps, Eremnophila aureonotata, Ammophila arvensis, Ammophila urnaria, Ammophila fernaldi, Ammophila pictipennis
- Eupathocera mendozae, host: Prionyx neoxenus
- Paraxenos nagatomii, host: Bembecinus bimaculatus
- Paraxenos novaeguineae, host: Bembecinus gazagnairei
- Paraxenos occidentalis, host: Bembix atrifrons
- Sphecixenos orientalis, host: Sceliphron madraspatanum formosanum
- Eupathocera piercei, host: Isodontia costipennis
- Paraxenos polli, host: Nysson braunsii
- Sphecixenos reticulatus, host: Sphex tomentosus
- Paraxenos rieki, host: Stizus basalis
- Sphecixenos simplex, host: Isodontia praslinia
- Tuberoxenos sinuatus, host: Ammophila punctaticeps
- Tuberoxenos sphecidarum, hosts: Podalonia affinis, Podalonia ebenina, Ammophila apicalis, Ammophila campestris, Ammophila heydeni, Ammophila holosericea, Ammophila nasuta, Ammophila pubescens, Ammophila sabulosa, Ammophila sp., Eremochares dives, Prionyx kirbii, Prionyx viduatus, Prionyx niveatus
- Eupathocera striati, host: Prionyx striatus
- Eupathocera taschenbergi, host: Prionyx pumilio
- Tuberoxenos teres, hosts: Ammophila beniniensis, Ammophila ferrugineipes
- Tuberoxenos tibetanus, host: Ammophila sp.
- Sphecixenos vanderiisti, host: Isodontia pelopoeiformis
- Eupathocera westwoodii, host: Sphex ichneumoneus

== Morphology ==
The larvae of Paraxenos (as in other Strepsiptera) are highly miniaturized. In Paraxenos kurosawai (now Sphecixenos kurosawai), the first instar larvae are 0.85mm long, one of the largest among the order in fact. The miniaturization and parasitic lifestyle of this order has resulted in a number of unusual morphological traits. Many muscle cells in the head have their nuclei in the posterior end of the head region due to limited space. Other muscles typically found in the head in other insects are in the thorax of Paraxenos. Their brains are also in their thoracic region. They have a reduced tentorium, reduced and fused mouthparts primarily used to pierce their host’s integument, reduced antennae and maxillary palps, no heart, and reduced eyes that are still capable of color vision. The ventral surfaces of the larvae have outgrowths that appear to assist in adhering to surfaces. The legs also have adhesive pads to stick to their hosts. Paraxenos larvae lack a jumping mechanism due to their phoretic nature. Adult males have four antennal four antennal segments, a thin sclerotized prementum separate from the mouthfield sclerites, a relatively wide postfrons not separated from the vertex plates, and a hindwing with a CuP vein. As in all Strepsiptera, the males have reduced forewings and longer hindwings that appear “twisted”, giving them their name “twisted-wing parasites”. They only live a few hours after emerging from their host to mate. Females are neotenic (also called larviform), meaning they retain larval characters. They spend their entire adult lives inside their hosts.
