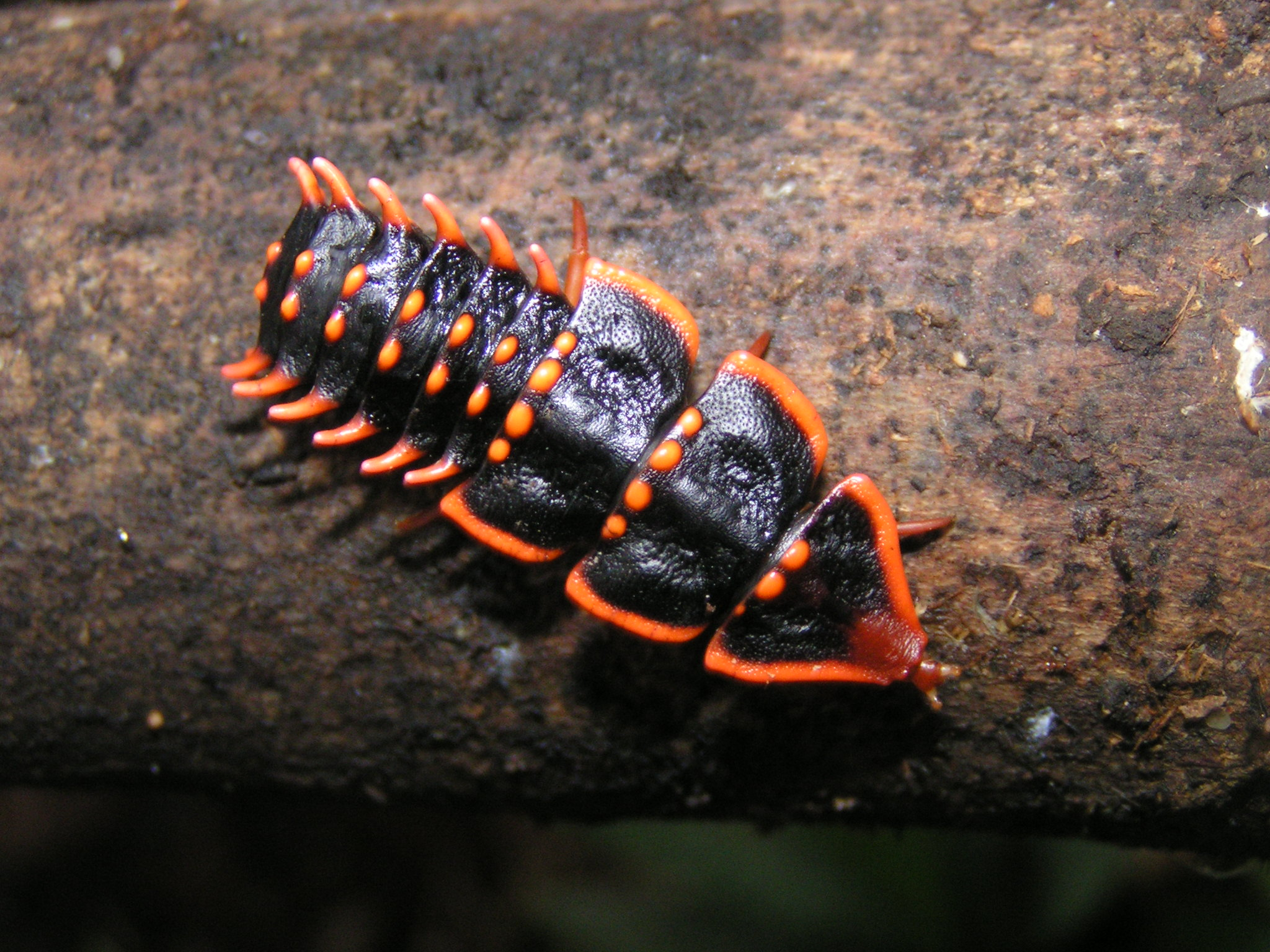

Scientific classification
- Kingdom: Animalia
- Phylum: Arthropoda
- Clade: Pancrustacea
- Class: Insecta
- Order: Coleoptera
- Suborder: Polyphaga
- Infraorder: Elateriformia
- Family: Lycidae
- Genus: Platerodrilus
- Species: P. paradoxus

Binomial name
- Platerodrilus paradoxus (Mjöberg, 1925)

Synonyms
- Duliticola paradoxa Mjöberg, 1925

= Platerodrilus paradoxus =

Species of beetle

Platerodrilus paradoxus is a species of trilobite beetle. It is only known from Malay Peninsula, Borneo, Sumatra and Java Island.
