= Trilobite larva =

Trilobite larva may refer to juvenile forms (larvae) of multiple unrelated groups of animals:

- Trilobites, extinct arthropods
- Xiphosura (horseshoe crabs), including living and fossil species
- Platerodrilus or trilobite beetles, a genus of living insects
