= Specific name (zoology) =

Term used in zoology

In zoological nomenclature, the specific name (also specific epithet, species epithet, or epitheton) is the second part (the second name) within the scientific name of a species (a binomen). The first part of the name of a species is the name of the genus or the generic name. The rules governing the naming of new species are explained in the article species description. For example, the scientific name for humans is Homo sapiens, which is the species name, consisting of two names: Homo is the "generic name" (the name of the genus) and sapiens is the "specific name".

== Etymology ==
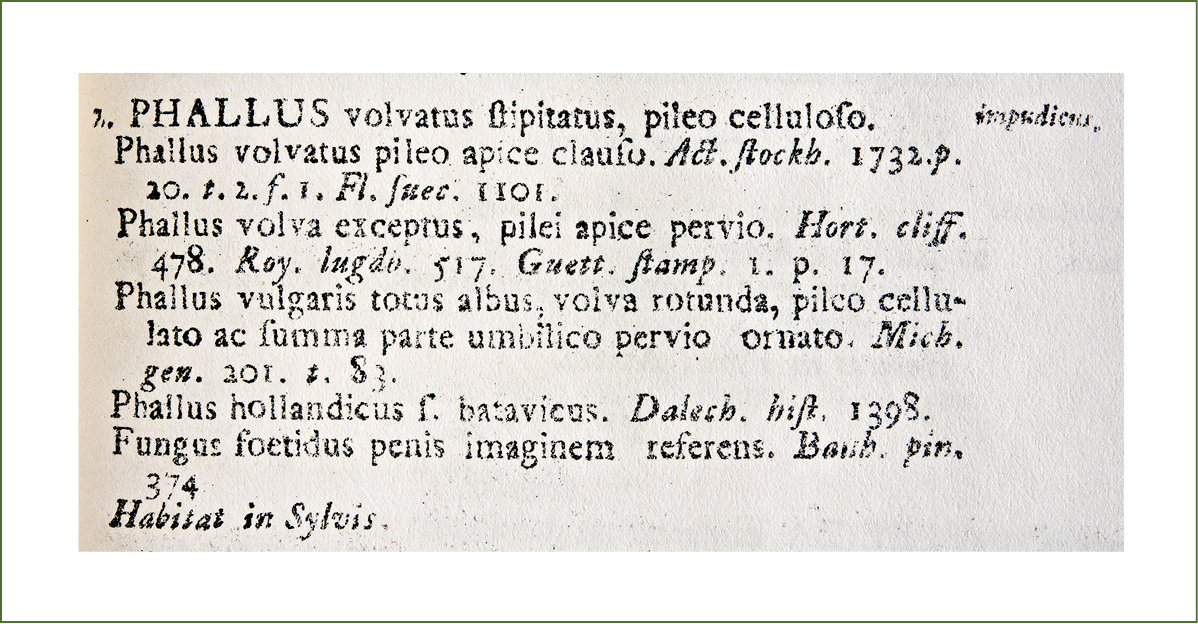
Part of page 1179 of volume 2 of the 1st edition of Linnaeus’s Species Plantarum, describing mushroom species Phallus impudicus. The body text is using polynomial nomenclature, with the trivial name attached in the margin.

Historically, specific name referred to the combination of what are now called the generic and specific names. Carl Linnaeus, who formalized binomial nomenclature, made explicit distinctions between specific, generic, and trivial names. The generic name was that of the genus, the first in the binomial, the trivial name was the second name in the binomial, and the specific the proper term for the combination of the two. For example the binomial name of the tiger, Panthera tigris:

- generic name = Panthera
- trivial name = tigris
- specific name = Panthera tigris

This was the proper usage from the 18th century into the late 20th century, although many authors seemed to be unaware of the distinctions between trivial and specific names and inconsistent and erroneous usage even appeared in the International Code of Zoölogical Nomenclature.

== The grammar of species names ==
Grammatically, a binomen (and a trinomen, also) must be treated as if it were a Latin phrase, no matter which language the words were originally taken from. (This gives some justification to the popular usage of the phrase "Latin name" instead of the more correct phrase "scientific name".) The specific name must adhere to certain conventions of Latin grammar. The specific name can be formed as:

- A noun in apposition to the genus name, for example, the scientific name of the lion, Panthera leo. In these cases, the word for the genus and the word for the species do not necessarily have to agree in gender. Species names which are nouns in apposition are sometimes the vernacular name of the organism in Latin or Ancient Greek, or the name (specific or generic) of another organism which the organism itself resembles.
- A noun in the genitive case (i.e. belonging to).
  - This is common in parasites: Xenos vesparum ("Stranger of the wasps").
  - Proper nouns which are names of people and places are often used in the genitive case. For example, the name of the coelacanth, Latimeria chalumnae which means "Latimeria of Chalumna", is a reference to the area near the mouth of the Chalumna River in the Indian Ocean, where the coelacanth was first found, i.e. its type locality.
- An adjective which must agree in case and gender with the genus: Felis silvestris ("the forest cat")

== Differences from botany ==
In botanical nomenclature, "name" always refers to the whole name (of a species or otherwise), whereas in zoological nomenclature it can refer to either part of the binomen. Thus Hedera helix (common ivy, English ivy) is the name of the species; Hedera is the name of the genus; but helix is called the specific epithet, not the specific name.
