= Larviform female =

Morphological phenomenon in insects

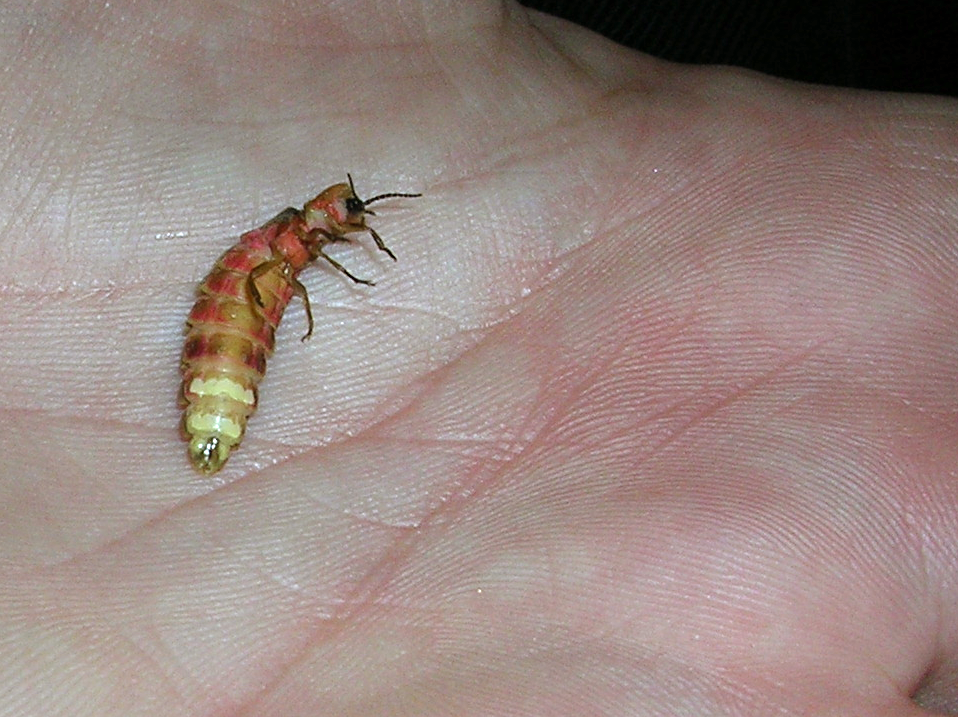
A larviform female of the Lampyridae. Unlike actual larvae, she has compound eyes.

Larviform female is a biological phenomenon occurring in some insect species, where the females in the adult stage of metamorphosis resemble the larvae to various degrees, while the male appears more morphologically adult (as imagoes). The resemblance may mean the larviform female has the same coloring as the larvae and/or similar body plans, and may be the result of the female arresting development at earlier stages of ecdysis than males. The female may not pupate at all, as in Xenos vesparum. Typically, the female is wingless and generally larger than the male. Larviform females still reach sexual maturity. Larviform females occur in several insect groups, including most Strepsiptera and bagworm moths, many elateroid beetles (e.g., Lampyridae, Lycidae, and Phengodidae), and some gall midges.

Larviform females are an area of interest in the study of the evolution of insect metamorphosis.

Since these females have lower ability to disperse, this may help explain high endemism in some groups, such as Lampyridae.

== See also ==
- Lampyridae
- Phengodidae
- Rhagophthalmidae
- Thylodrias contractus
- Hypermetamorphosis
- Neoteny
