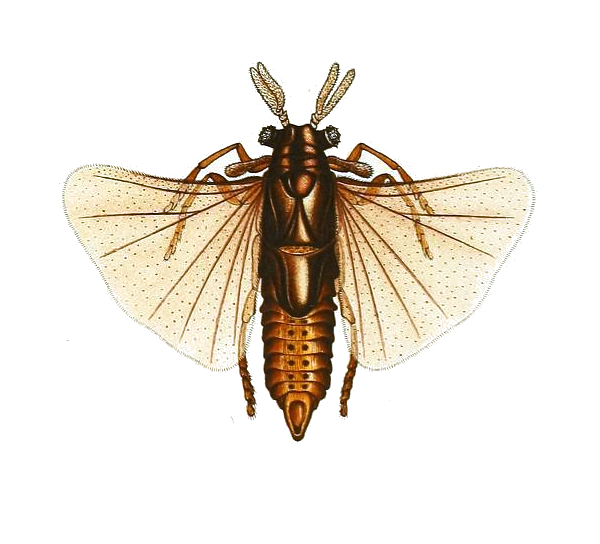
- Male Xenos vesparum in its winged insect stage

Scientific classification
- Kingdom: Animalia
- Phylum: Arthropoda
- Clade: Pancrustacea
- Class: Insecta
- Order: Strepsiptera
- Suborder: Stylopidia
- Family: Xenidae
- Genus: Xenos
- Species: X. vesparum

Binomial name
- Xenos vesparum Rossi, 1793

= Xenos vesparum =

Species of wasp-parasitizing insect

Xenos vesparum is a parasitic insect species of the order Strepsiptera that are endoparasites of paper wasps in the genus Polistes (most commonly Polistes dominula) that was first described in 1793. Like other members of this family, X. vesparum displays a peculiar lifestyle, and demonstrates extensive sexual dimorphism.

== Morphology ==
Males and female of this species show remarkable sexual dimorphism according to their mating system. Both develop inside the abdomen, where males pupate and emerge, while females permanently reside inside.

=== Males ===
Adult males are free-living, flying insects, whose extremely short (<5 hours) adult lives are solely dedicated to finding a mate, which they are thought to locate by scent. After locating a mate (who is protruding from the host wasp's abdomen), the male lands on the wasp's abdomen, holding on with its legs and wings, while avoiding the brushing of the wasp's hindlegs, which could potentially dislodge it. The male then inseminates the female by either spreading sperm around the female's genital opening, where it eventually reaches the haemocoel (body cavity), or by directly penetrating the female's cuticle (hypodermic insemination), injecting the sperm directly into the haemocoel. The male then dies several minutes after mating. Their small size coupled with their extremely short lifespan has made male X. vesparum very difficult to study.

Males also develop very unusual eyes compared to other insects. The eyes consist of a very small number of ommatidia (around 65, but each eye can vary by 10-15), while most insect eyes have thousands per eye which are closely packed together. The ommatidia are irregularly distributed across the eye and are well separated by cuticle. The function of these eyes is unknown, because mate finding, which is their only purpose as adults, seems to be done by scent and the structure of the eyes indicate that they are modified larval eyes. Interestingly, they are externally quite similar to the eyes of phacopid trilobites.

The forewings of these insects are modified into small, club-like organs called pseudohalteres. These are to help the insect maintain equilibrium in flight, and function similarly to halteres found in Dipterans.

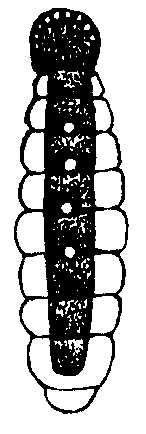
female

=== Females ===
Female X. vesparum are markedly different from their male counterparts. They display a high degree of neoteny, and are permanent endoparasites of their hosts. They reside in the wasp's body cavity and never develop mouthparts, legs, eyes or wings, and their only form of genitalia is the ventral opening where males can inseminate them, as well as being the point of larval escape. Females can often survive overwinter inside hibernating female wasps, which will emerge the following spring with underdeveloped ovaries, and will only be able to serve as vessels to spread the parasite's larvae as they are now effectively castrated.

== Life cycle ==
The first life stage of this species are, alongside adult males, the only free living stages of these insects' lives. Called "triungulins", these larvae exit the mother's genital opening via the ability to detect light, and are deposited either in a feeding/mating area for the wasps, or directly into the nest, depending on where the mother's host wasp was when releasing the larvae. In the case of the former, they then must locate a foraging wasp using chemical cues, and then grasp on to it and be carried back to the nest. Once back in the nest, the triungulins seek out an appropriate host, which are immature wasps at various stages of development. This process is known to be nonrandom, because preference for infecting females has been recorded. The penetration of the host's abdomen is done without creating a wound, instead the larva enters the wasp's abdomen via mechanical separation of the host's cuticle. This step is essential in delaying or avoiding the initial immune response that would come with creation of a wound. The triungulin then moults into its second stage without ecdysis, a feature only seen in strepsipterans.

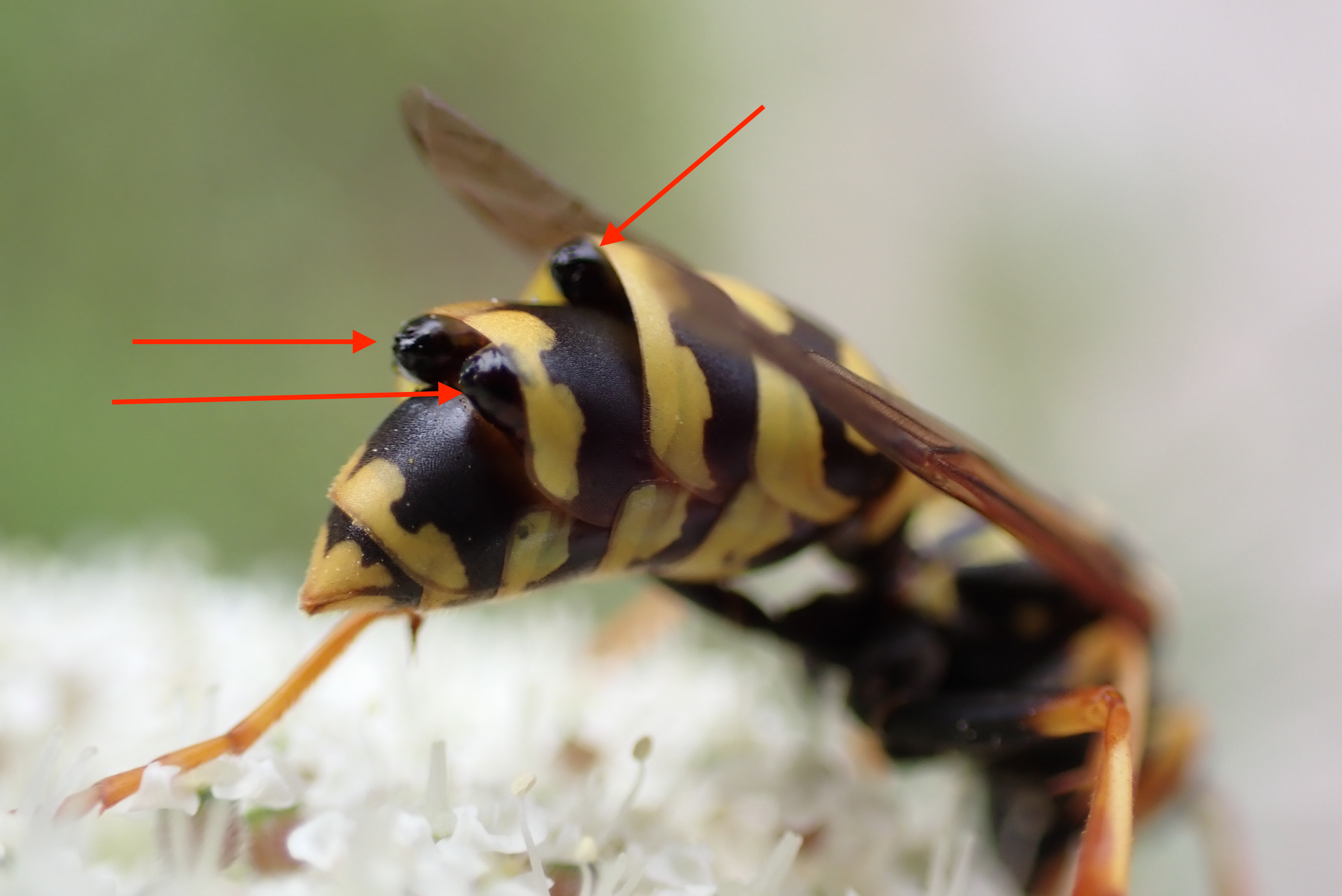
Polistes sp. parasitized by three Xenos vesparum parasites

The second and third larval stages grow extensively, but slowly, possibly to avoid ill effects to the host, whose survival is paramount to the parasite's survival. During these life stages, X. vesparum are able to passively and actively avoid the host's immune system. The exact mechanism for this is unknown, but it is possible that the parasite's surface has chemical properties that allow it to remain concealed from the host immune system, and the ability to moult without ecdysis is likely a method to retain this protection and is a preadaptation for its endoparasitic lifestyle.

The fourth and final life cycle stage is the development to the free living male or neotenic female form, followed by their whole or partial emergence respectively. The male pupates and develops into the final free living form, and his pupae extrudes from the wasp's abdomen, providing an emergence route for the adult male. Conversely, the female develops into the final neotenic form and extrudes from the host abdomen far enough for the genital opening to be reached by a mate, as well as far enough to allow larvae to escape. In both cases, this extrusion of the female parasite or male pupa from the host abdomen is referred to as "stylopization", referring to the family of these insects.

== Effects on host ==
=== Host manipulation ===
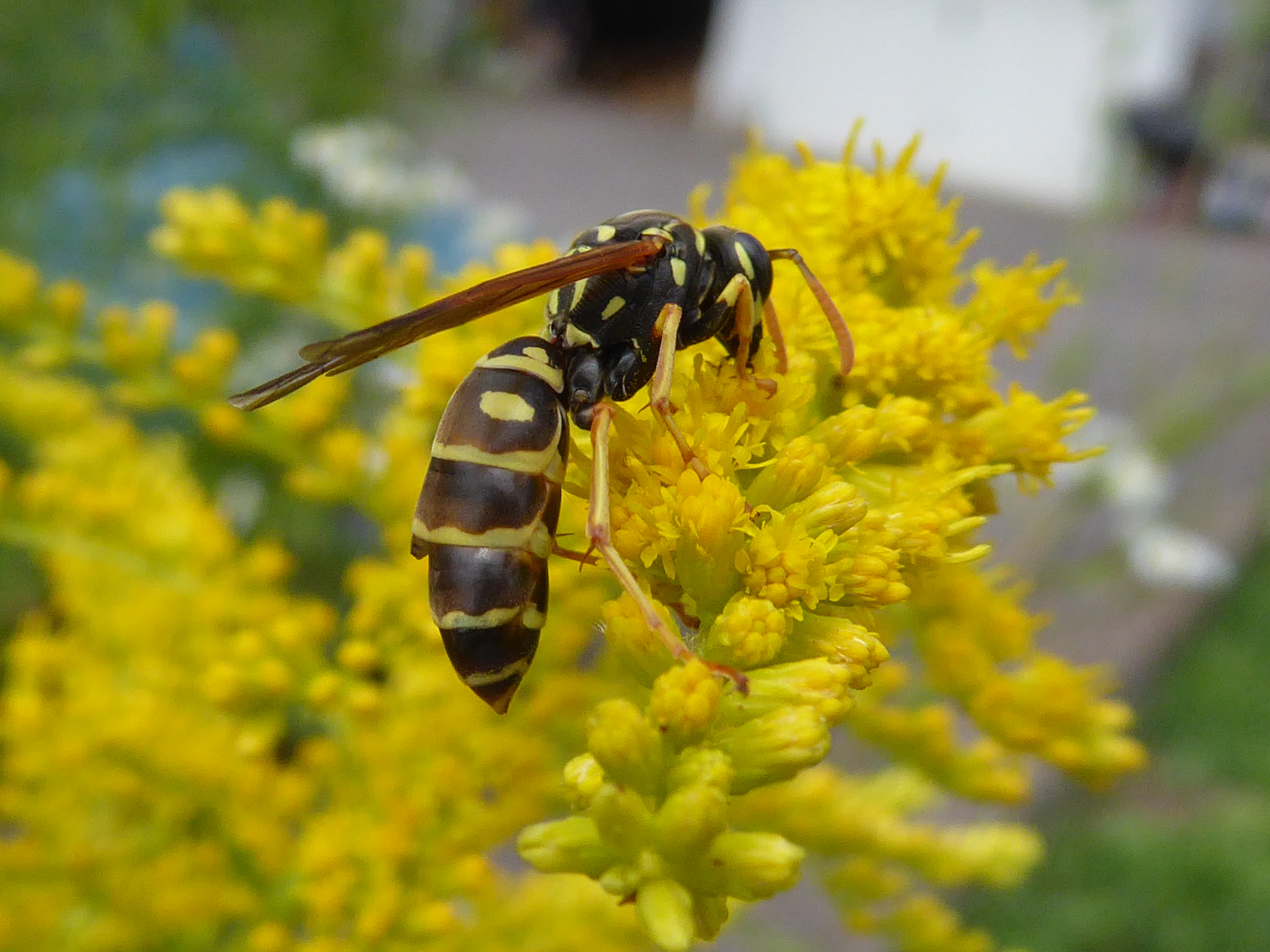
Polistes sp. parasitized by Xenos vesparum

Female worker wasps infected with X. vesparum appear to have their behaviour modified because they act as if they are future queens and cease working, abandoning the nest before the uninfected future foundresses and males do, and form aggregations outside of the nest. When the uninfected future queens leave the nest to go to these mating grounds, it provides an area where uninfected and infected wasps mix, and this is often where release of infective larvae occurs. Because the parasite does not modify male wasp behaviour, it is a "dead end" for female X. vesparum as the male wasps do not join in these large aggregations and provide little opportunity for the parasite to receive a mate. Additionally, the male wasp dies before winter, eliminating the chance of the larvae spreading in hibernating aggregations. However, if infected with a male parasite, the male wasp is not a "dead end" because the free living male parasite can emerge and fly to a suitable mate within the mating aggregations. This may explain the recorded preference X. vesparum larvae have for infecting female wasps.

A trend noted in paper wasps infected by this parasite is that they appear to exhibit a strong preference to congregating on Campsis radicans (trumpet creeper) bushes. This indicates a likely case of coevolution between parasite and host because the wasps are manipulated to prefer trumpet creeper bushes which provide shelter and excellent nutrition for the wasp, increasing its chance of survival, and by extension, increasing the parasite's chances as well. In addition, the preference towards a specific plant type allows a greater chance of the parasite spreading because many foraging wasps are congregated in one spot, providing a vector for released infective larvae to reach the nest and infect young wasps.

=== Host castration ===
Parasitized female wasps feature undeveloped ovaries as well as lowered levels of juvenile hormones and they abandon the colony without performing any of their caste's duties, meaning the host is castrated and reproductively "dead", leading some to describe X. vesparum a parasitoid as it applies to female wasps. The effects on the male wasp's reproductive health is less understood. It appears that, at least for light to moderate parasite loads, the reproductive health of parasitized male wasps is virtually unaffected, while the effects of highly parasitized individuals (>4 parasites) is unknown.
