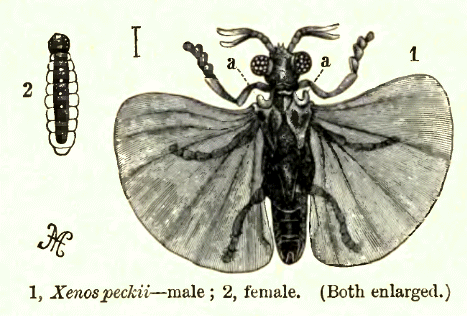

Scientific classification
- Domain: Eukaryota
- Kingdom: Animalia
- Phylum: Arthropoda
- Class: Insecta
- Order: Strepsiptera
- Suborder: Stylopidia
- Family: Xenidae
- Genus: Xenos; Rossi, 1793

= Xenos (insect) =

Genus of insects

Xenos is a genus of insects belonging to the family Xenidae. The word derives from the Greek word for strange. The type species of the genus is Xenos vesparum, first described by Pietro Rossi in 1793. The females are permanent entomophagous endoparasites of Polistes paper wasps, spending their whole lives in the wasp's abdomen.

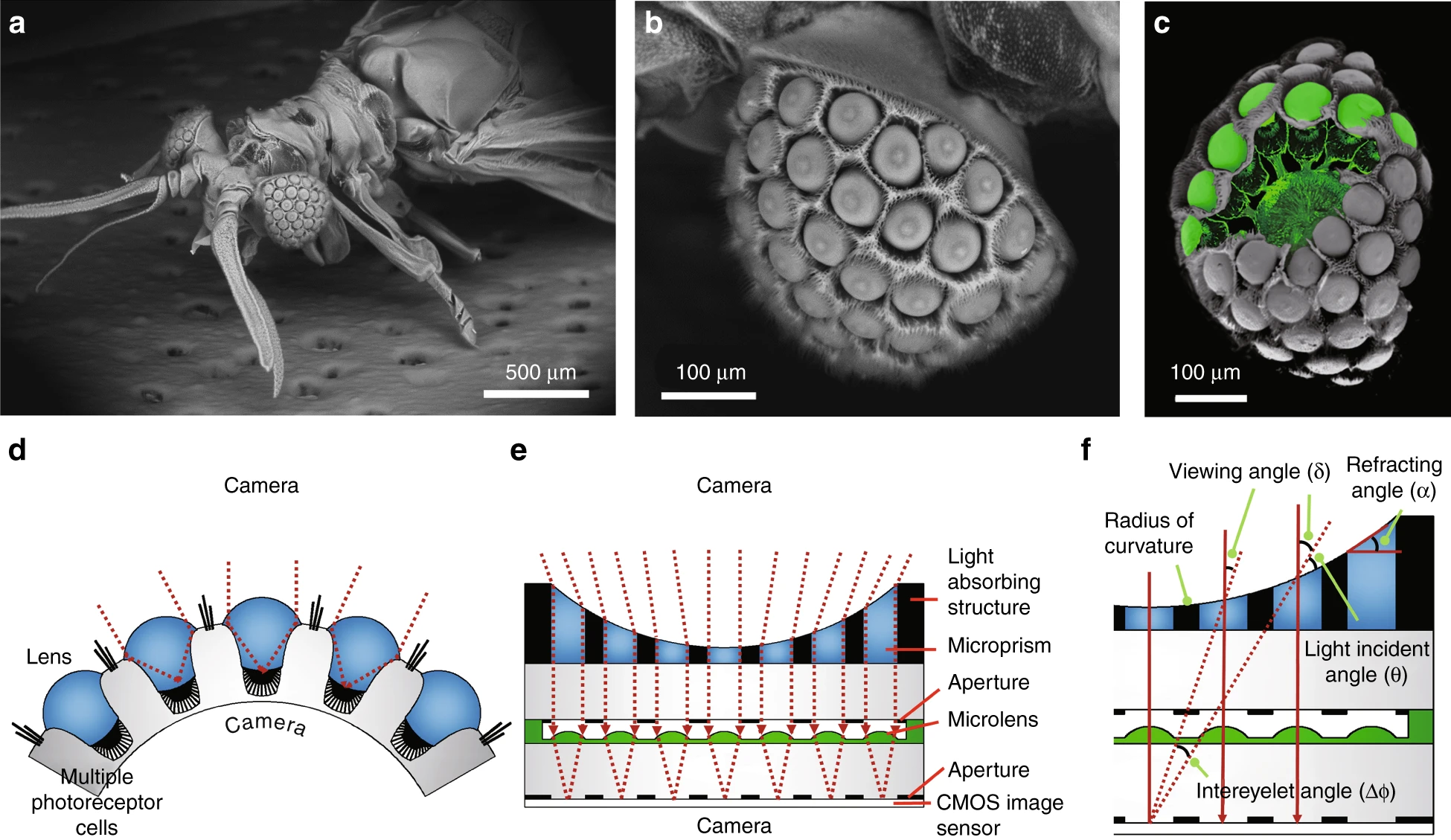

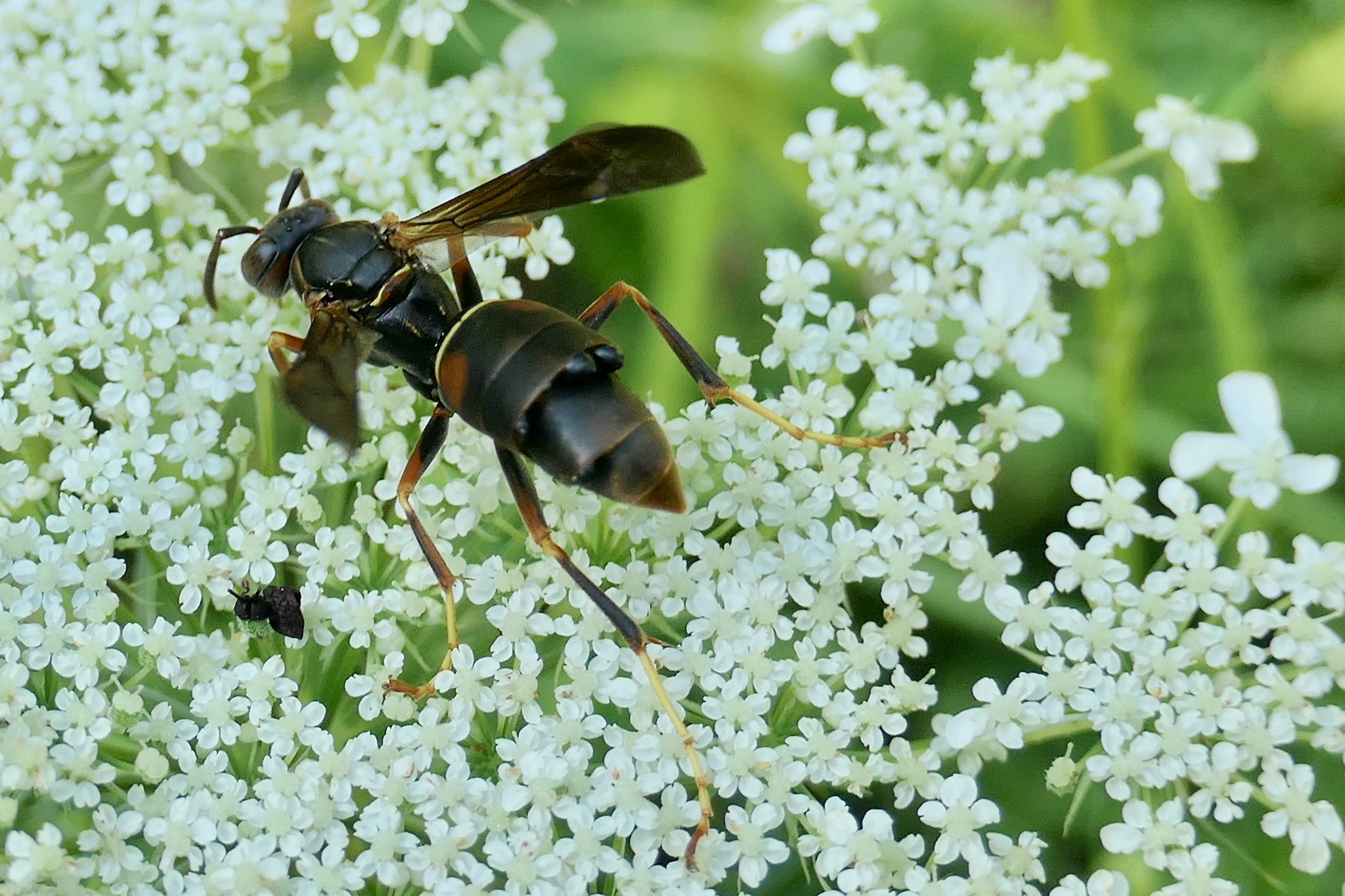
Four male pupae are visible partially emerged from the wasp's abdomen; likely Xenos peckii, which is a parasite of the paper wasp Polistes fuscatus.

== Species ==
These 33 species belong to the genus Xenos:

- Xenos afer Pasteels, 1950 (Africa)
- Xenos americanus (Brèthes, 1923) (South America)
- Xenos argentinus Brèthes, 1923 (South America)
- Xenos boharti Hofmann, 1965 (South America)
- Xenos bohlsi Hoffmann, 1914 (South America)
- Xenos bonairensis Brèthes, 1923 (South America)
- Xenos circularis Kifune & Maeta, 1985 (Asia)
- Xenos colombiensis Cook, Mayorga-Ch & Sarmiento, 2020
- Xenos dianshuiwengi Yang, 1999
- Xenos formosanus Kifune & Maeta, 1985 (Asia)
- Xenos hamiltoni Kathirithamby & Hughes, 2006 (Central America and Mexico)
- Xenos hebraei Kinzelbach, 1978 (Palearctic)
- Xenos hospitus Oliveira & Kogan, 1962 (South America)
- Xenos hunteri (Pierce, 1909) (North America)
- Xenos indespectus Oliveira & Kogan, 1962 (South America)
- Xenos iviei Kifune, 1983
- Xenos kifunei Cook & Mathison, 1997 (North America)
- Xenos moutoni Buysson, 1903 (Southern Asia and temperate Asia)
- Xenos niger Pasteels, 1950 (Africa)
- Xenos nigrescens Brues, 1903 (North America and South America)
- Xenos oxyodontes Nakase & Kato, 2013 (Southern Asia)
- Xenos pallidus Brues, 1903 (North America)
- Xenos peckii Kirby, 1813
- Xenos peruensis Kifune, 1979 (South America)
- Xenos provesparum Kifune, 1986 (Southern Asia and tropical Asia)
- Xenos ropalidiae (Kinzelbach, 1975)
- Xenos rostratus Trois, 1984 (South America)
- Xenos rubiginosi (Pierce, 1909) (North America)
- Xenos stuckenbergi Pasteels, 1956 (Africa)
- Xenos vesparum Rossi, 1793 (Palearctic and Africa)
- Xenos yamaneorum Kifune & Maeta, 1985 (Asia)
- Xenos yangi Dong, Liu & Li, 2022
- Xenos zavattarii (Pierce, 1911) (Africa)
