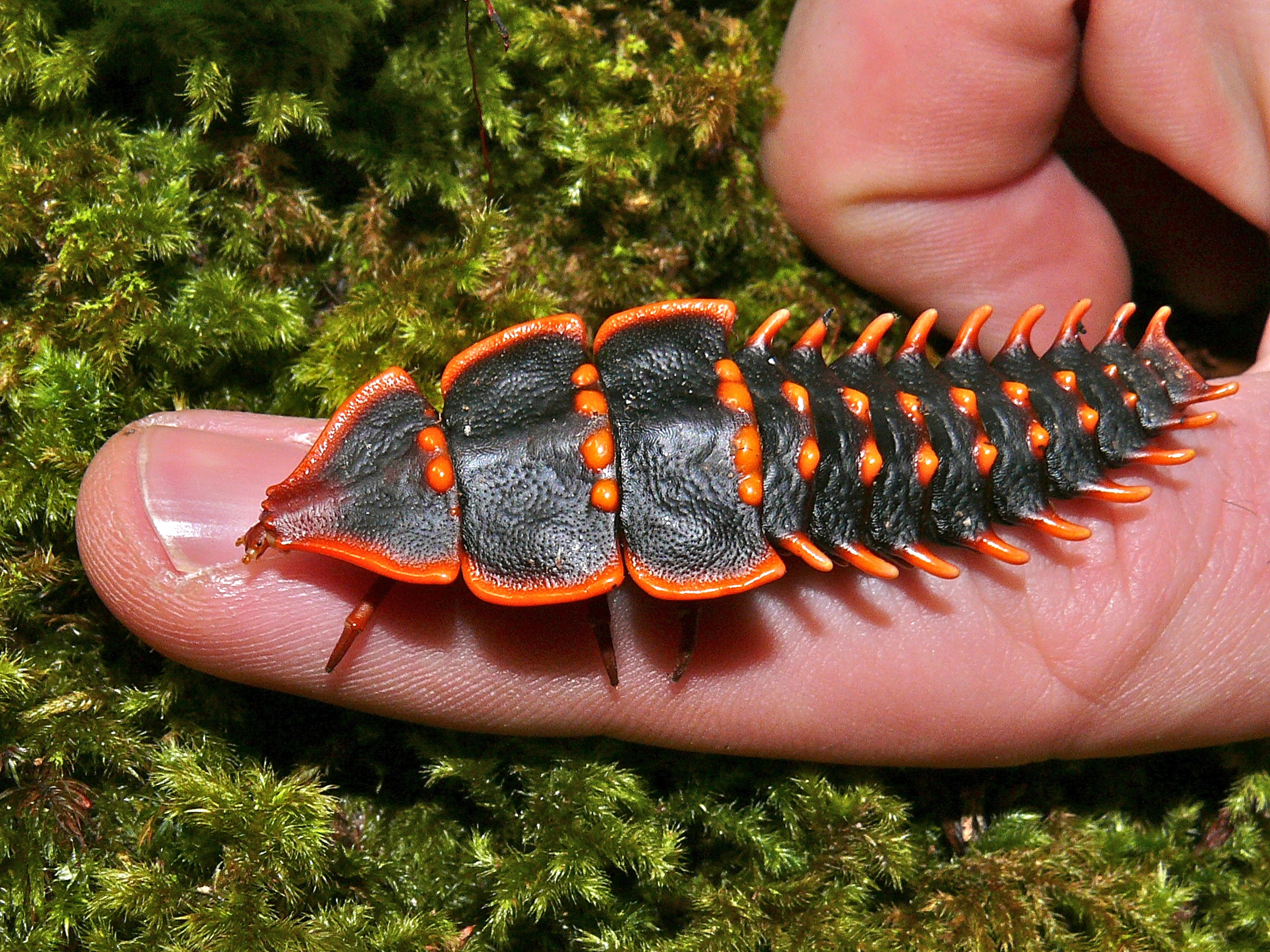
- Platerodrilus ngi female

Scientific classification
- Kingdom: Animalia
- Phylum: Arthropoda
- Class: Insecta
- Order: Coleoptera
- Suborder: Polyphaga
- Infraorder: Elateriformia
- Family: Lycidae
- Subfamily: Leptolycinae; Leng & Mutchler, 1922

= Leptolycinae =

Subfamily of beetles

Leptolycinae is a subfamily of the Lycidae or "net-winged beetles" erected by Leng and Mutchler in 1922. This subfamily includes notable genera such as Platerodrilus, which are sometimes called "trilobite beetles".

== Tribes and genera ==
BioLib includes three extant tribes and the fossil tribe †Burmolycini Bocak, Light & Ellenberger, 2019.

=== Dexorini ===
Auth. Kleine, 1933

1. Dexoris Waterhouse, 1878
2. Elgodexoris Bocak & Bocakova, 1987
3. Lampyrolycus Burgeon, 1937
4. Lolodorfus Bocakova, 2014
5. Mimolibnetis Pic, 1936

=== Duliticolini ===
Auth. Mjöberg, 1925

1. Atamania (beetle) Kazantzev, 2004
2. Autaphes Kazantzev, 2004
3. Microeron Kazantzev, 2004
4. Miniduliticola Kazantsev, 2003
5. Platerodrilus Pic, 1921
6. Sinodulia Kazantsev, 2003

=== Leptolycini ===
Auth. Leng & Mutchler, 1922

1. Alyculus Kazantsev, 1999
2. Ceratoprion Gorham, 1884
3. Cessator Kazantsev, 2009
4. †Electropteron Kazantsev, 2012
5. Flabellocaenia Pic, 1929
6. Leptolycus Leng & Mutchler, 1922 - type genus
