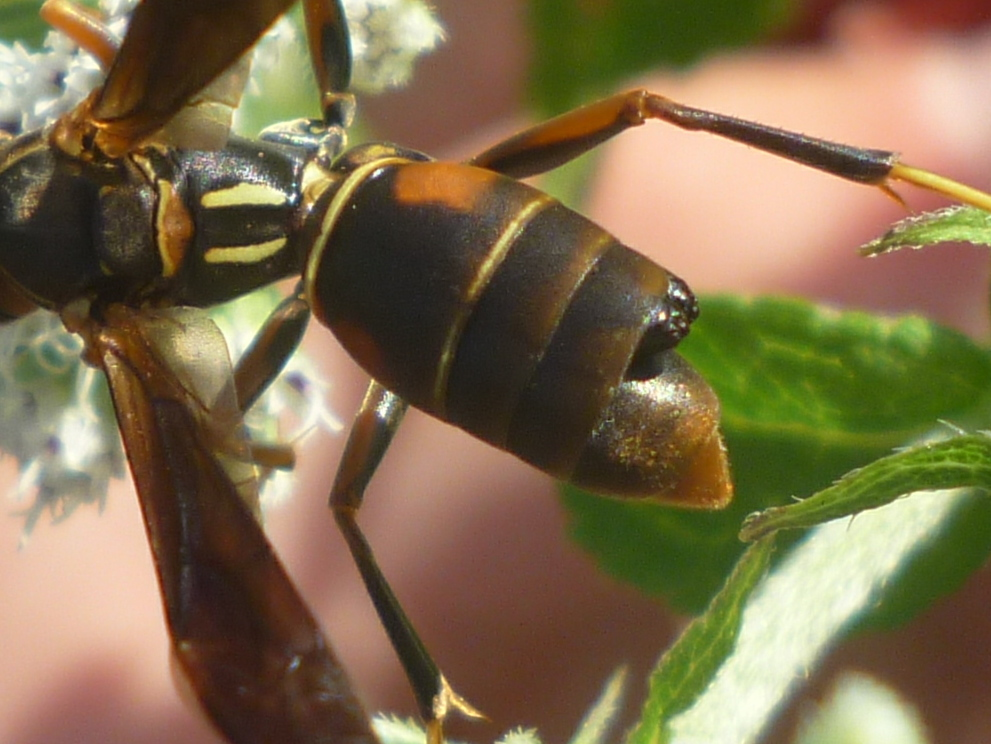
- Xenos peckii pupae on a paper wasp (New York)

Scientific classification
- Kingdom: Animalia
- Phylum: Arthropoda
- Clade: Pancrustacea
- Class: Insecta
- Order: Strepsiptera
- Suborder: Stylopidia
- Family: Xenidae; Saunders, 1872

= Xenidae =

Family of insects

Xenidae is a family of twisted-winged insects in the order Strepsiptera. There are about 13 genera and more than 120 described species in Xenidae.

== Genera ==
These 13 genera belong to the family Xenidae:

- Brasixenos Kogan & Oliveira, 1966
- Deltoxenos Benda et al, 2022
- Eupathocera Pierce, 1908
- Leionotoxenos Pierce, 1909
- Macroxenos Schultze, 1925
- Nipponoxenos (Kifune & Maeta, 1975)
- Paragioxenos Ogloblin, 1923
- Paraxenos Saunders, 1872
- Pseudoxenos Saunders, 1872
- Sphecixenos Benda et al, 2022
- Tachytixenos Pierce, 1911
- Tuberoxenos Benda et al, 2022
- Xenos Rossi, 1793
