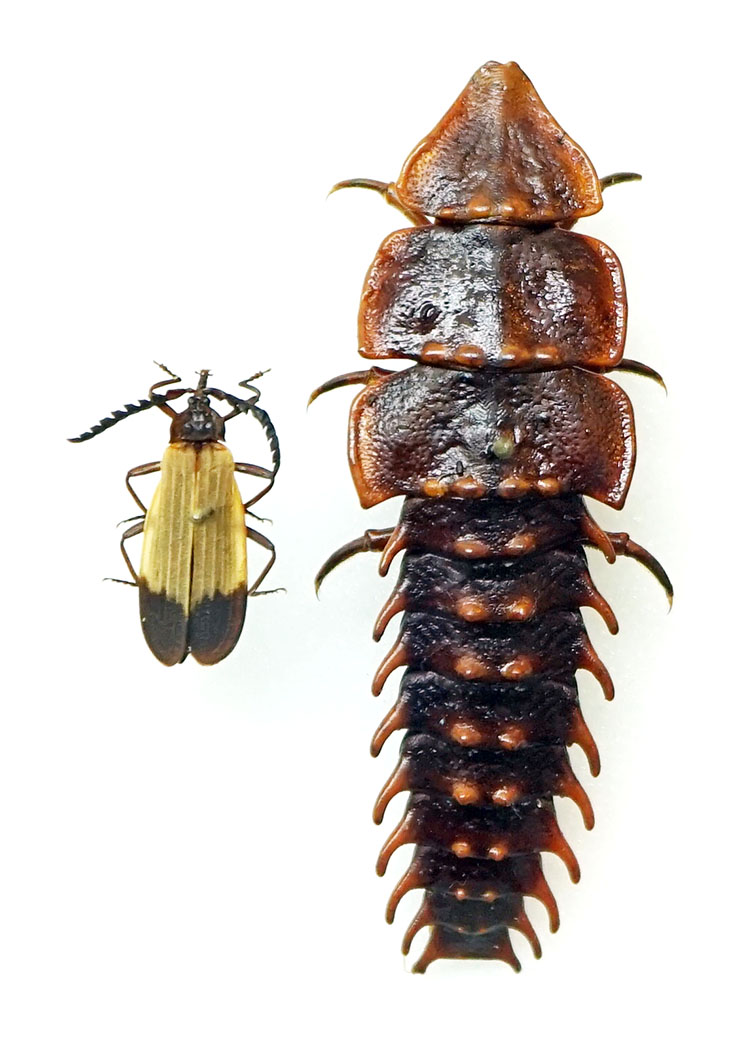
- Male and female of Platerodrilus

Scientific classification
- Kingdom: Animalia
- Phylum: Arthropoda
- Clade: Pancrustacea
- Class: Insecta
- Order: Coleoptera
- Suborder: Polyphaga
- Infraorder: Elateriformia
- Family: Lycidae
- Subfamily: Leptolycinae
- Tribe: Duliticolini
- Genus: Platerodrilus; Pic, 1921

Species
- see text

Synonyms
- Duliticola Mjöberg, 1925; Falsocalochromus Pic, 1942; Platerodriloplesius Wittmer, 1944; Platrilus Kazantsev, 2009

= Platerodrilus =

Genus of beetles

Platerodrilus is a genus of beetles of the family Lycidae. They commonly appear in the literature under the name Duliticola, which is an obsolete junior synonym. The females retain a larval form as adults (larviform females) and are about 40–80 mm in length. The females and larvae have a flattened, dark body with large scales over the head, resembling trilobites, hence the informal names trilobite beetle, trilobite larva or Sumatran trilobite larva. The females feed on rotting wood, fungi, slime molds, and other small organisms that help break down decaying matter. Males are much smaller, 8–9 mm, resemble other lycid beetles, and likely feed on nectar for energy to fly and mate. Species are found in tropical forests of India and Southeast Asia.

Although the females resemble the prehistoric trilobite, the trilobite beetle evolved approximately 47 million years ago, 200 million years after trilobites had gone extinct. As only the females have this appearance the search for the species' males remained a mystery until Swedish zoologist Eric Mjöberg published a research paper describing them in 1925.

== Species ==
- "P. paradoxus group"
  - Platerodrilus foliaceus Masek & Bocak, 2014
  - Platerodrilus paradoxus (Mjöberg, 1925)
    - =Duliticola paradoxa Mjöberg, 1925
- "P. major group"
  - Platerodrilus major Pic, 1921
  - Platerodrilus ngi Masek & Bocak, 2014
  - Platerodrilus wittmeri Masek & Bocak, 2014
- "P. sinuatus group"
  - Platerodrilus ijenensis Masek & Bocak, 2014
  - |Platerodrilus luteus Masek & Bocak, 2014
  - Platerodrilus maninjauensis Masek & Bocak, 2014
  - Platerodrilus montanus Masek & Bocak, 2014
  - Platerodrilus palawanensis Masek & Bocak, 2014
  - Platerodrilus ranauensis Masek & Bocak, 2014
  - Platerodrilus sibayakensis Masek & Bocak, 2014
  - Platerodrilus sinabungensis Masek & Bocak, 2014
  - Platerodrilus sinuatus Pic, 1921
  - Platerodrilus talamauensis Masek & Bocak, 2014
  - Platerodrilus tujuhensis Masek & Bocak, 2014
- Ungrouped
  - Platerodrilus bicolor (Wittmer, 1966)
    - =Platerodriloplesius bicolor Wittmer, 1966
  - Platerodrilus crassicornis (Pic, 1923)
    - =Platrilus crassicornis (Pic, 1923)
  - Platerodrilus hirtus (Wittmer, 1938)
    - =Platrilus hirtus (Wittmer, 1938)
  - Platerodrilus korinchiana
  - Platerodrilus robinsoni Blair, 1928
  - Platerodrilus ruficollis (Pic, 1942)
    - =Falsocalochromus ruficollis Pic, 1942
    - =Duliticola hoiseni Wong, 1996
Specimens of Platerodrilus

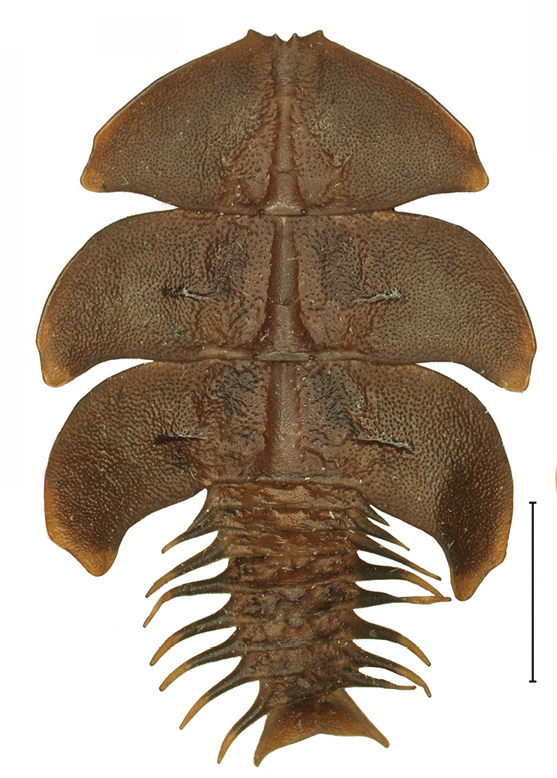
P. foliaceus

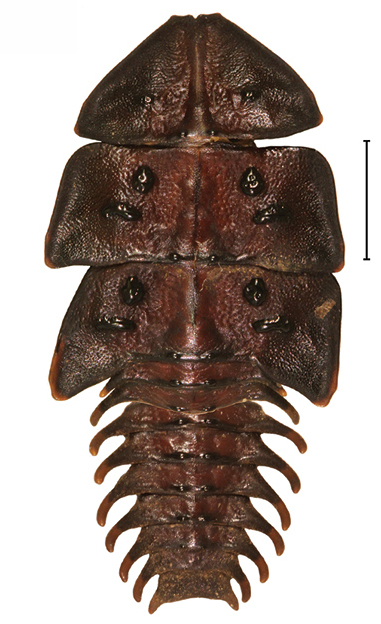
P. maninjauensis

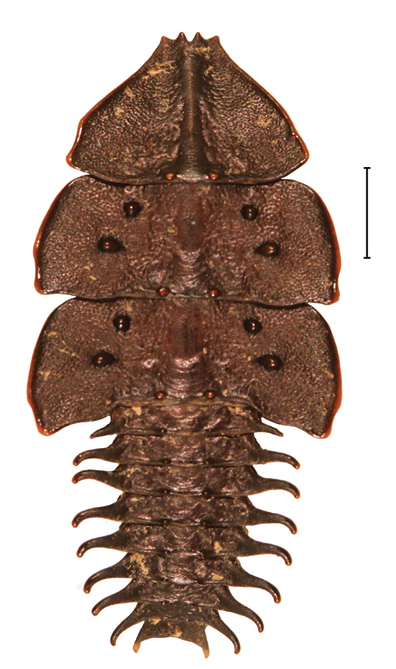
P. montanus

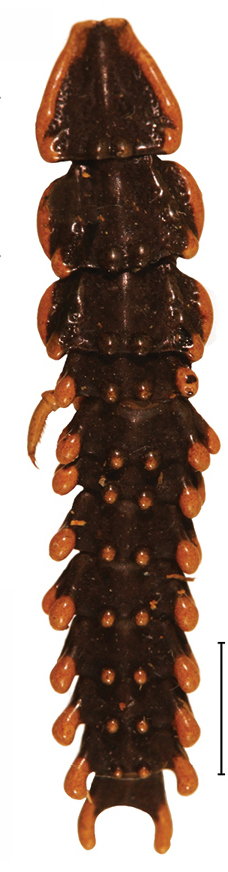
P. ngi

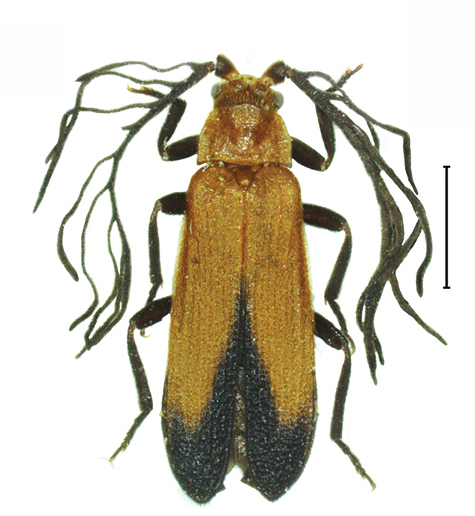
P. palawanensis, adult male

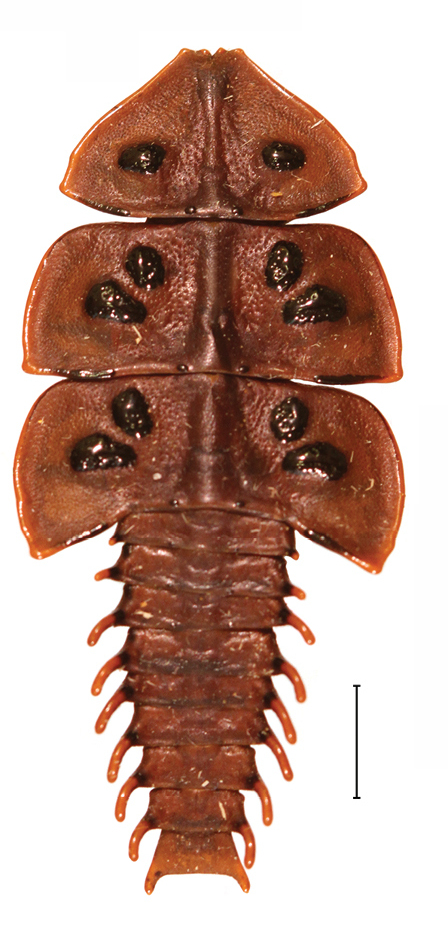
P. ruficollis

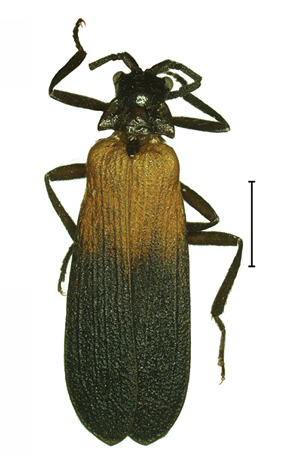
P. sinabungensis, adult male

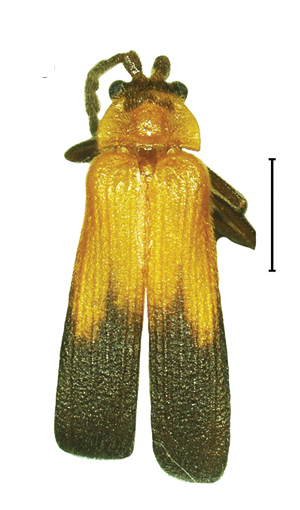
P. talamauensis, adult male

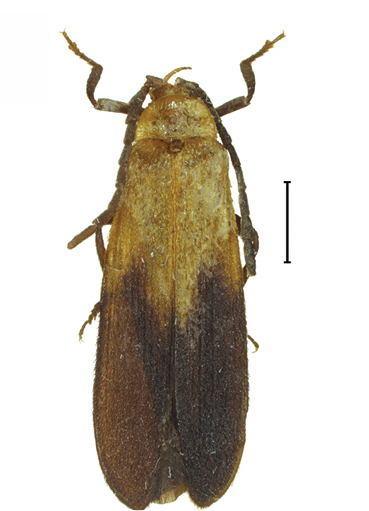
P. wittmeri

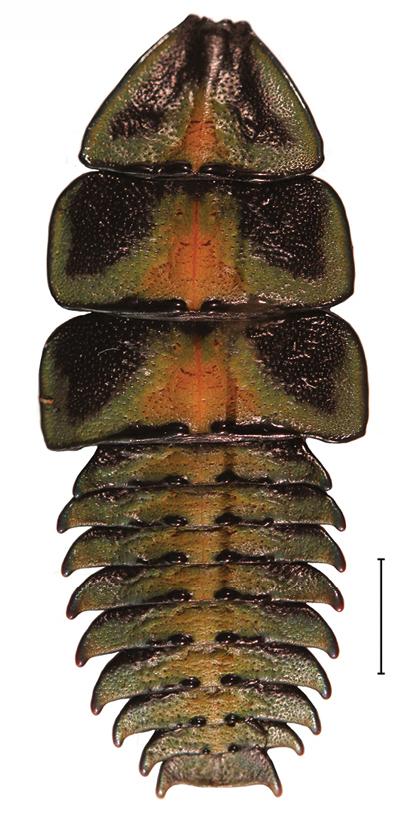
P. sp.

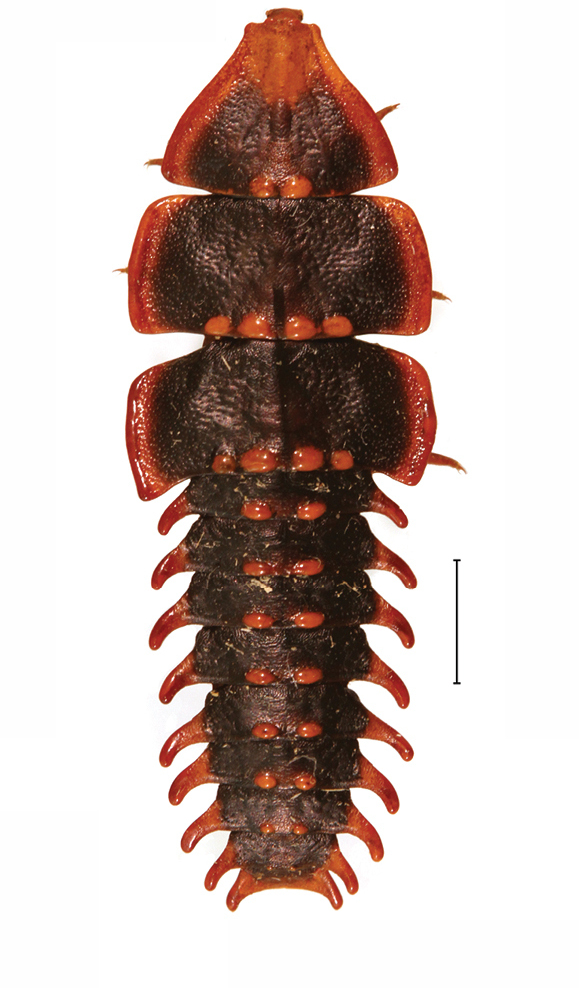
P. sp.

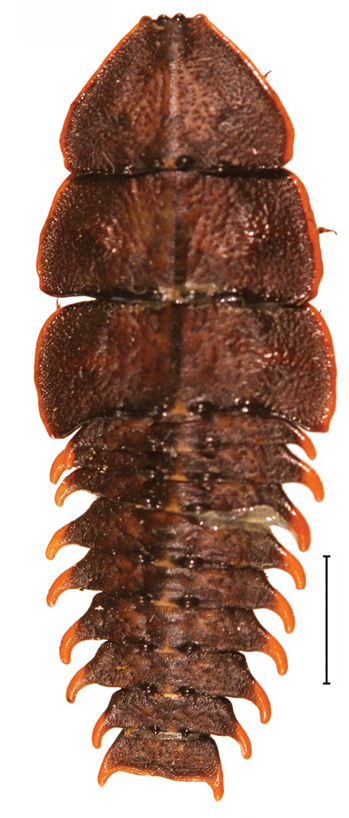
P. sp.

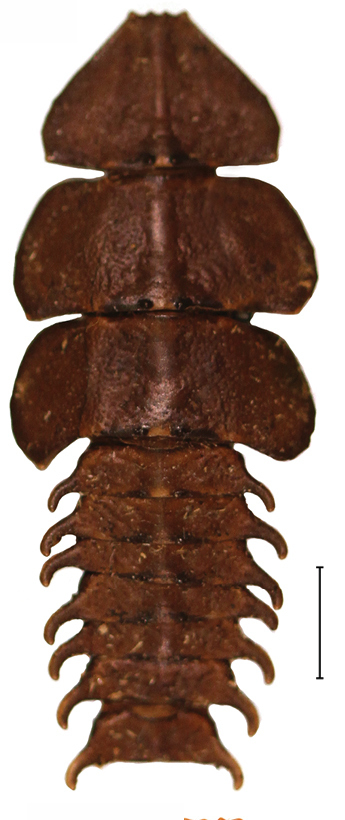
P. sp.
