= List of Chimarra species =

This is a list of 576 species in the genus Chimarra, little black caddisflies.

== Chimarra species ==
- Chimarra abacensis ^{g}
- Chimarra aberrans Martynov, 1935^{i c g}
- Chimarra abyssinica Banks, 1913^{i c g}
- Chimarra aciculata Morse, 1974^{i c g}
- Chimarra acinaciformis Flint, 1998^{i c g}
- Chimarra actinifera Schmid, 1958^{i c g}
- Chimarra acula Flint, 1998^{i c g}
- Chimarra acuta Ross, 1959^{i c g}
- Chimarra adamsae Blahnik, 1998^{i c g}
- Chimarra adella Denning, 1952^{i c g}
- Chimarra adelphe Blahnik, 1998^{i c g}
- Chimarra adiatulla Malicky, 1993^{i c g}
- Chimarra adnama Malicky, 1993^{i c g}
- Chimarra africana Enderlein, 1929^{i c g}
- Chimarra aiyura Korboot, 1965^{i c g}
- Chimarra akana Gibbs, 1973^{i c g}
- Chimarra akantha Blahnik, 1997^{i c g}
- Chimarra akarawitta Schmid, 1958^{i c g}
- Chimarra akkaorum Chantaramongkol & Malicky, 1989^{i c g}
- Chimarra alata Bueno-Soria, 1983^{i c g}
- Chimarra alayoi Botosaneanu, 1980^{i c g}
- Chimarra albomaculata Kolbe, 1888^{i c g}
- Chimarra alcicorne Malicky, 1995^{i c g}
- Chimarra alleni Chantaramongkol & Malicky, 1989^{i c g}
- Chimarra alticola Banks, 1937^{i c g}
- Chimarra altmani Blahnik, 1998^{i c g}
- Chimarra amarganth Malicky, 1989^{i c g}
- Chimarra ambaja Mosely, 1939^{i c g}
- Chimarra ambulans Barnard, 1934^{i c g}
- Chimarra amica Blahnik & Holzenthal, 1992^{i c g}
- Chimarra aminadab Malicky, 1993^{i c g}
- Chimarra anakwoswasi Malicky, 1995^{i c g}
- Chimarra aneca Malicky & Chantaramongkol, 1993^{i c g}
- Chimarra angolensis Marlier, 1965^{i c g}
- Chimarra angustipennis Banks, 1903^{i c g}
- Chimarra anoaclana (Malicky, 1978)^{i c g}
- Chimarra anticheira Vilarino & Calor^{g}
- Chimarra antigua Flint, 1967^{i c g}
- Chimarra antilliana Flint, 1968^{i c g}
- Chimarra argax Malicky, 1989^{i c g}
- Chimarra argeia Malicky & Chantaramongkol, 1997^{i c g}
- Chimarra argentella Ulmer, 1906^{i c g}
- Chimarra argentinica Ulmer, 1909^{i c g}
- Chimarra ariadne Malicky, 1997^{i c g}
- Chimarra arima Blahnik, 1998^{i c g}
- Chimarra ariomana Malicky, 1993^{i c g}
- Chimarra armata Jacquemart, 1961^{i c g}
- Chimarra assamensis Kimmins, 1957^{i c g}
- Chimarra atara Malicky & Chantaramongkol, 1993^{i c g}
- Chimarra aterrima Hagen, 1861^{i c g b}
- Chimarra atilanoi Blahnik, 1998^{i c g}
- Chimarra atnia Malicky & Chantaramongkol, 1993^{i c g}
- Chimarra atripennis Banks, 1931^{i c g}
- Chimarra augusta Morse, 1971^{i c g}
- Chimarra aurantibasis Flint, 1998^{i c g}
- Chimarra aureofusca Kimmins, 1957^{i c g}
- Chimarra aureopunctata Flint, 1967^{i c g}
- Chimarra auriceps Hagen, 1858^{i c g}
- Chimarra auricoma Kimmins, 1957^{i c g}
- Chimarra auripilis Navas, 1933^{i c g}
- Chimarra aurivittata Flint, 1971^{i c g}
- Chimarra auronitens Ulmer, 1906^{i c g}
- Chimarra australica Ulmer, 1916^{i c g}
- Chimarra australis Navas, 1923^{i c g}
- Chimarra aviceps Flint, 1998^{i c g}
- Chimarra babarensis ^{g}
- Chimarra babuyana Mey, 1998^{i c g}
- Chimarra bacillorum Mey, 1990^{i c g}
- Chimarra baculifera Marlier, 1965^{i c g}
- Chimarra banksi (Ulmer, 1907)^{i c g}
- Chimarra barinita Flint, 1998^{i c g}
- Chimarra barrettae (Banks, 1900)^{i c g}
- Chimarra batukaua Malicky, 1995^{i c g}
- Chimarra beameri Denning, 1950^{i c g}
- Chimarra beckeri Flint, 1998^{i c g}
- Chimarra belizensis Blahnik, 1998^{i c g}
- Chimarra berenike Malicky, 1998^{i c g}
- Chimarra berghei Marlier, 1951^{i c g}
- Chimarra bertrandi Scott, 1974^{i c g}
- Chimarra bettinae Marlier & Marlier, 1982^{i c g}
- Chimarra beylaensis Gibon, 1986^{i c g}
- Chimarra biatec Malicky, 1993^{i c g}
- Chimarra bicolor (Banks, 1901)^{i c g}
- Chimarra bicoloroides Flint, 1967^{i c g}
- Chimarra bidens Ulmer, 1909^{i c g}
- Chimarra bidentata Blahnik, 1998^{i c g}
- Chimarra bimbltona Malicky, 1979^{i c g}
- Chimarra biramosa Kimmins, 1957^{i c g}
- Chimarra bisectilis Flint, 1998^{i c g}
- Chimarra bispinosa Gibbs, 1973^{i c g}
- Chimarra biungulata Kimmins, 1964^{i c g}
- Chimarra blepharophera Flint, 1998^{i c g}
- Chimarra boraceia Flint, 1998^{i c g}
- Chimarra braconoides (Walker, 1860)^{i c g}
- Chimarra brasiliana Ulmer, 1905^{i c g}
- Chimarra braueri ^{g}
- Chimarra briseis Malicky, 1998^{i c g}
- Chimarra burmana Kimmins, 1957^{i c g}
- Chimarra burmeisteri Flint, 1998^{i c g}
- Chimarra butleri Denning, 1962^{i c g}
- Chimarra cachina Mosely, 1942^{i c g}
- Chimarra cakaudrovensis ^{g}
- Chimarra calawiti Mey, 1995^{i c g}
- Chimarra callasae Gibon, 1982^{i c g}
- Chimarra calundoensis Marlier, 1965^{i c g}
- Chimarra camella Blahnik, 1997^{i c g}
- Chimarra camerunensis Marlier, 1980^{i c g}
- Chimarra camposae Flint, 1998^{i c g}
- Chimarra camura Blahnik, 1997^{i c g}
- Chimarra canoaba Flint, 1998^{i c g}
- Chimarra cara Mosely, 1936^{i c g}
- Chimarra caribea Flint, 1968^{i c g}
- Chimarra carolae Flint, 1998^{i c g}
- Chimarra cartwrighti ^{g}
- Chimarra cascada Blahnik, 1998^{i c g}
- Chimarra centralis Ross, 1959^{i c g}
- Chimarra centrispina Flint, 1998^{i c g}
- Chimarra cereris Barnard, 1934^{i c g}
- Chimarra ceylanica Kimmins, 1957^{i c g}
- Chimarra cheesmanae Kimmins, 1962^{i c g}
- Chimarra chela Blahnik, 1997^{i c g}
- Chimarra chiangmaiensis Chantaramongkol & Malicky, 1989^{i c g}
- Chimarra chicapa Marlier, 1965^{i c g}
- Chimarra chocoensis Blahnik, 1998^{i c g}
- Chimarra chrysosoma Flint, 1998^{i c g}
- Chimarra cipoensis Flint, 1998^{i c g}
- Chimarra circularis Hagen, 1859^{i c g}
- Chimarra cirrifera Flint, 1998^{i c g}
- Chimarra clara Mosely, 1939^{i c g}
- Chimarra claviloba Flint, 1974^{i c g}
- Chimarra cognata Kimmins, 1957^{i c g}
- Chimarra coheni Blahnik, 1998^{i c g}
- Chimarra colmillo Blahnik & Holzenthal, 1992^{i c g}
- Chimarra coma Malicky & Chantaramongkol, 1993^{i c g}
- Chimarra concava Kimmins, 1957^{i c g}
- Chimarra concolor Ulmer, 1905^{i c g}
- Chimarra confusa Ulmer, 1907^{i c g}
- Chimarra congestla Malicky, 1993^{i c g}
- Chimarra conica Flint, 1983^{i c g}
- Chimarra consimilis Martynov, 1912^{i c g}
- Chimarra cornuta Ross, 1959^{i c g}
- Chimarra costaricensis Flint, 1998^{i c g}
- Chimarra creagra Flint, 1981^{i c g}
- Chimarra crena Bueno-Soria, 1983^{i c g}
- Chimarra crenobia Mey, 1995^{i c g}
- Chimarra crepidata Kimmins, 1957^{i c g}
- Chimarra cressae Blahnik, 1998^{i c g}
- Chimarra crinobia Mey, 1995^{i c g}
- Chimarra crocifera Morse, 1974^{i c g}
- Chimarra cubanorum Botosaneanu, 1980^{i c g}
- Chimarra cultellata Flint, 1983^{i c g}
- Chimarra cumata Malicky & Chantaramongkol, 1993^{i c g}
- Chimarra curfmani Ross, 1959^{i c g}
- Chimarra cyclopica Kimmins, 1962^{i c g}
- Chimarra danaokana Mey, 1998^{i c g}
- Chimarra decimlobata Flint, 1991^{i c g}
- Chimarra deksamensis Malicky, 1999^{i c g}
- Chimarra demeter Malicky, 2000^{i c g}
- Chimarra dentosa Ross, 1948^{i c g}
- Chimarra devoensis ^{g}
- Chimarra devva Malicky & Chantaramongkol, 1993^{i c g}
- Chimarra diakis Flint, 1971^{i c g}
- Chimarra diannae Flint & Sykora, 1993^{i c g}
- Chimarra didyma Flint, 1998^{i c g}
- Chimarra digitata Martynov, 1935^{i c g}
- Chimarra dioni Gibon, 1986^{i c g}
- Chimarra dirke Malicky & Thamsenanupap in Malicky, 2000^{i c g}
- Chimarra discolor Kimmins, 1957^{i c g}
- Chimarra distermina Flint, 1998^{i c g}
- Chimarra divergena Gibbs, 1973^{i c g}
- Chimarra dolabrifera Flint & Reyes-Arrunategui, 1991^{i c g}
- Chimarra dominicana Flint, 1968^{i c g}
- Chimarra donamariae Denning & Sykora, 1968^{i c g}
- Chimarra duckworthi Flint, 1967^{i c g}
- Chimarra dudosa Blahnik, 1998^{i c g}
- Chimarra dulitensis Kimmins, 1955^{i c g}
- Chimarra dybowskina Navás, 1931^{i c g}
- Chimarra eccaio Malicky, 1993^{i c g}
- Chimarra elga Mosely, 1939^{i c g}
- Chimarra elia Ross, 1944^{i c g}
- Chimarra elviomar Malicky, 1993^{i c g}
- Chimarra embia Ross, 1959^{i c g}
- Chimarra emima Ross, 1959^{i c g}
- Chimarra ensifera Flint, 1998^{i c g}
- Chimarra erectiloba Flint, 1998^{i c g}
- Chimarra espinosa Blahnik, 1998^{i c g}
- Chimarra evoluta Kimmins, 1957^{i c g}
- Chimarra exapia Malicky & Chantaramongkol, 1993^{i c g}
- Chimarra excavata Kimmins, 1957^{i c g}
- Chimarra falcata Kimmins, 1962^{i c g}
- Chimarra falcifera Jacquemart, 1966^{i c g}
- Chimarra falculata Lago & Harris, 1987^{i c g}
- Chimarra fallax (Ulmer, 1912)^{i c g}
- Chimarra fansipangensis Mey, 1998^{i c g}
- Chimarra fenestrata Kimmins, 1964^{i c g}
- Chimarra feria Ross, 1941^{i c g}
- Chimarra fernandezi Flint, 1981^{i c g}
- Chimarra feuerborni Ulmer, 1951^{i c g}
- Chimarra fijiana ^{g}
- Chimarra fimbriata Flint, 1974^{i c g}
- Chimarra fittkaui Flint, 1971^{i c g}
- Chimarra flaviventris Kimmins, 1957^{i c g}
- Chimarra flinti Bueno-Soria, 1985^{i c g}
- Chimarra florida Ross, 1944^{i c g}
- Chimarra foliata Kimmins, 1959^{i c g}
- Chimarra forcipata Blahnik, 1997^{i c g}
- Chimarra formosana Ulmer, 1915^{i c g}
- Chimarra froehlichi Flint, 1998^{i c g}
- Chimarra fulmeki Ulmer, 1951^{i c g}
- Chimarra furcata Jacquemart, 1961^{i c g}
- Chimarra furti Mey, 1998^{i c g}
- Chimarra fusca Kimmins, 1957^{i c g}
- Chimarra fuscipes Kimmins, 1958^{i c g}
- Chimarra garciai Botosaneanu, 1980^{i c g}
- Chimarra gemmal Malicky, 1989^{i c g}
- Chimarra georgensis Barnard, 1934^{i c g}
- Chimarra geranoides Flint, 1998^{i c g}
- Chimarra gibba Blahnik, 1998^{i c g}
- Chimarra gigama Malicky, 1989^{i c g}
- Chimarra gilvimacula Flint, 1998^{i c g}
- Chimarra godagama Schmid, 1958^{i c g}
- Chimarra gondela Flint, 1974^{i c g}
- Chimarra goroca Sykora, 1967^{i c g}
- Chimarra gressitti Sykora, 1967^{i c g}
- Chimarra guanacasteca Blahnik & Holzenthal, 1992^{i c g}
- Chimarra guapa Botosaneanu, 1977^{i c g}
- Chimarra guatemalensis Blahnik, 1998^{i c g}
- Chimarra gunungkawi Malicky, 1995^{i c g}
- Chimarra guyanensis Flint, 1998^{i c g}
- Chimarra haesitationis Botosaneanu, 1994^{i c g}
- Chimarra haimuoi Malicky, 1995^{i c g}
- Chimarra haimuoiba Malicky, 1995^{i c g}
- Chimarra haimuoibon Malicky, 1995^{i c}
- Chimarra haimuoihai Malicky, 1995^{i c g}
- Chimarra haimuoimot Malicky, 1995^{i c g}
- Chimarra haimuoinam Malicky, 1995^{i c g}
- Chimarra hairouna Botosaneanu, 1990^{i c g}
- Chimarra hamularis Sun, 1997^{i c g}
- Chimarra heliaca Mey, 1998^{i c g}
- Chimarra heligma Blahnik, 1997^{i c g}
- Chimarra helomyzida ^{g}
- Chimarra henryi Kimmins, 1957^{i c g}
- Chimarra heppneri Blahnik, 1997^{i c g}
- Chimarra hezron Malicky, 1993^{i c g}
- Chimarra hienghene Malicky, 1981^{i c g}
- Chimarra holzenthali Lago & Harris, 1987^{i c g}
- Chimarra hoogstraali Ross, 1956^{i c g}
- Chimarra horok Malicky, 1989^{i c g}
- Chimarra houvichka Schmid, 1960^{i c g}
- Chimarra htinorum Chantaramongkol & Malicky, 1989^{i c g}
- Chimarra hyoeides Flint, 1983^{i c g}
- Chimarra immaculata Ulmer, 1911^{i c g}
- Chimarra indigota Mosely, 1941^{i c g}
- Chimarra inflata Blahnik, 1998^{i c g}
- Chimarra ino Marlier, 1981^{i c g}
- Chimarra intermedia Jacquemart, 1961^{i c g}
- Chimarra intexta Mosely, 1931^{i c g}
- Chimarra inthanonensis Chantaramongkol & Malicky, 1989^{i c g}
- Chimarra irwini Flint, 1998^{i c g}
- Chimarra izabala Blahnik, 1998^{i c g}
- Chimarra jacobsoni Ulmer, 1951^{i c g}
- Chimarra jamaicensis Flint, 1968^{i c g}
- Chimarra janzeni Blahnik & Holzenthal, 1992^{i c g}
- Chimarra jaroschi Malicky, 1994^{i c g}
- Chimarra jemima Blahnik & Holzenthal, 1992^{i c g}
- Chimarra jiraprapa Chantaramongkol & Malicky, 1986^{i c g}
- Chimarra jisipu Malicky, 1989^{i c g}
- Chimarra joliveti Jacquemart, 1979^{i c g}
- Chimarra jugescens Flint, 1998^{i c g}
- Chimarra juliae Flint, 1998^{i c g}
- Chimarra kabashana (Marlier, 1943)^{i c g}
- Chimarra kadavuensis ^{g}
- Chimarra kailishchandrai Malicky, 1997^{i c g}
- Chimarra karenorum Chantaramongkol & Malicky, 1989^{i c g}
- Chimarra karoyanitensis ^{g}
- Chimarra kenyana Ulmer, 1931^{i c g}
- Chimarra khamuorum Chantaramongkol & Malicky, 1989^{i c g}
- Chimarra khasia Kimmins, 1957^{i c g}
- Chimarra kimminsi ^{g}
- Chimarra koki Botosaneanu, 1996^{i c g}
- Chimarra kokodana Kimmins, 1962^{i c g}
- Chimarra kontilos Blahnik, 1997^{i c g}
- Chimarra koualeensis Joahnson & Mary, 2009^{g}
- Chimarra krugeri Jacquemart, 1963^{i c g}
- Chimarra kuala Olah, 1993^{i c g}
- Chimarra kumaonensis Martynov, 1935^{i c g}
- Chimarra kwansiensis Hwang, 1957^{i c g}
- Chimarra lacroixi Navas, 1921^{i c g}
- Chimarra laguna Ross, 1951^{i c g}
- Chimarra lahuorum Chantaramongkol & Malicky, 1989^{i c g}
- Chimarra lakhwinderae ^{g}
- Chimarra langleyae Blahnik, 1998^{i c g}
- Chimarra lankana Kimmins, 1957^{i c g}
- Chimarra lannaensis Chantaramongkol & Malicky, 1989^{i c g}
- Chimarra lata Blahnik & Holzenthal, 1992^{i c g}
- Chimarra lavensis ^{g}
- Chimarra lavuaorum Chantaramongkol & Malicky, 1989^{i c g}
- Chimarra lejea Mosely, 1948^{i c g}
- Chimarra leopoldi Jacquemart, 1981^{i c g}
- Chimarra leta Mosely, 1936^{i c g}
- Chimarra leucophlebia Navás, 1932^{i c g}
- Chimarra levuensis ^{g}
- Chimarra lewisi Kimmins, 1957^{i c g}
- Chimarra lichiuensis Hsu & Chen, 1996^{i c g}
- Chimarra limon Blahnik, 1998^{i c g}
- Chimarra lissuorum Chantaramongkol & Malicky, 1989^{i c g}
- Chimarra litugena Malicky & Chantaramongkol, 1993^{i c g}
- Chimarra litussa Malicky & Chantaramongkol, 1993^{i c g}
- Chimarra lobata Flint, 1967^{i c g}
- Chimarra lojaensis Flint, 1998^{i c g}
- Chimarra longistylis Jacquemart & Statzner, 1981^{i c g}
- Chimarra longiterga Blahnik & Holzenthal, 1992^{i c g}
- Chimarra lorengau Malicky, 1994^{i c g}
- Chimarra loriana Navas, 1933^{i c g}
- Chimarra lotta Malicky, 1993^{i c g}
- Chimarra lufirae Jacquemart, 1961^{i c g}
- Chimarra lukawaei Jacquemart, 1961^{i c g}
- Chimarra lupialae Jacquemart, 1961^{i c g}
- Chimarra luzonica Banks, 1913^{i c g}
- Chimarra lwirona Statzner, 1976^{i c g}
- Chimarra macara Flint, 1998^{i c g}
- Chimarra machadoi ^{g}
- Chimarra machaerophora Flint, 1968^{i c g}
- Chimarra macuatensis ^{g}
- Chimarra majuscula Blahnik, 1997^{i c g}
- Chimarra malaisei Kimmins, 1957^{i c g}
- Chimarra maldonadoi Flint, 1964^{i c g}
- Chimarra malickyi ^{g}
- Chimarra manni Banks, 1924^{i c g}
- Chimarra margaritae Flint, 1991^{i c g}
- Chimarra marginata (Linnaeus, 1767)^{i c g}
- Chimarra maritza Flint, 1998^{i c g}
- Chimarra massana Malicky, 1994^{i c g}
- Chimarra matura Malicky & Chantaramongkol, 1993^{i c g}
- Chimarra mauritania Jacquemart, 1960^{i c g}
- Chimarra mawsmaiensis ^{g}
- Chimarra mayottensis Joahnson & Mary, 2009^{g}
- Chimarra medioloba Flint, 1971^{i c g}
- Chimarra meorum Chantaramongkol & Malicky, 1989^{i c g}
- Chimarra merengue Blahnik, 1997^{i c g}
- Chimarra mesodonta Vilarino & Calor^{g}
- Chimarra mexicana (Banks, 1900)^{i c g}
- Chimarra minca Flint, 1998^{i c g}
- Chimarra mindanensis Mey, 1998^{i c g}
- Chimarra minga Flint, 1998^{i c g}
- Chimarra minima Ulmer, 1907^{i c g}
- Chimarra minuta Martynov, 1935^{i c g}
- Chimarra mitis (Hagen, 1858)^{i c g}
- Chimarra mlabriorum Chantaramongkol & Malicky, 1989^{i c g}
- Chimarra moesta Banks, 1924^{i c g}
- Chimarra momma Malicky & Chantaramongkol, 1993^{i c g}
- Chimarra mommaides Mey, 1998^{i c g}
- Chimarra mongelutonga Malicky, 1979^{i c g}
- Chimarra monorum Chantaramongkol & Malicky, 1989^{i c g}
- Chimarra montana Kimmins, 1955^{i c g}
- Chimarra monticola Kimmins in Mosely & Kimmins, 1953^{i c g}
- Chimarra morio Burmeister, 1839^{i c g}
- Chimarra moselyi Denning, 1948^{i c g}
- Chimarra munozi Blahnik & Holzenthal, 1992^{i c g}
- Chimarra muoibay Malicky, 1995^{i c g}
- Chimarra muoichin Malicky, 1995^{i c g}
- Chimarra muoitam Malicky, 1995^{i c g}
- Chimarra mushuvae Marlier, 1951^{i c g}
- Chimarra mussaua Malicky, 1994^{i c g}
- Chimarra mycterophora Flint, 1998^{i c g}
- Chimarra nahesson Malicky & Chantaramongkol, 1993^{i c g}
- Chimarra naitasirensis ^{g}
- Chimarra nakkiensis ^{g}
- Chimarra nasuta Flint, 1998^{i c g}
- Chimarra nathani ^{g}
- Chimarra neblina Blahnik, 1997^{i c g}
- Chimarra nemet Malicky, 1993^{i c g}
- Chimarra neofimbriata Flint, 1974^{i c g}
- Chimarra nepalensis Kimmins, 1964^{i c g}
- Chimarra nervosa (Brauer, 1867)^{i c g}
- Chimarra nigra Kimmins, 1964^{i c g}
- Chimarra nigrella Mey, 1995^{i c g}
- Chimarra nigrorosea Schmid, 1960^{i c g}
- Chimarra noebia Malicky & Chantaramongkol, 1993^{i c g}
- Chimarra nonna Malicky, 1993^{i c g}
- Chimarra oaxaca Blahnik, 1998^{i c g}
- Chimarra obscura (Walker, 1852)^{i c g b}
- Chimarra obscurella Banks, 1924^{i c g}
- Chimarra okuihorum Mey, 1998^{i c g}
- Chimarra onima Flint, 1991^{i c g}
- Chimarra opaca Mey, 1998^{i c g}
- Chimarra ophiognatha Mey, 1998^{i c g}
- Chimarra ortiziana Flint, 1967^{i c g}
- Chimarra otuzcoensis Flint & Reyes-Arrunategui, 1991^{i c g}
- Chimarra ovalis Ross, 1959^{i c g}
- Chimarra pablito Flint, 1998^{i c g}
- Chimarra palawana Malicky, 1994^{i c g}
- Chimarra papuana Kimmins, 1962^{i c g}
- Chimarra paracreagra Blahnik, 1998^{i c g}
- Chimarra parana Flint, 1972^{i c g}
- Chimarra paraortiziana Blahnik & Holzenthal, 1992^{i c g}
- Chimarra parasocia Lago & Harris, 1987^{i c g}
- Chimarra paria Flint, 1998^{i c g}
- Chimarra pataplan Malicky, 1989^{i c g}
- Chimarra patosa Ross, 1956^{i c g}
- Chimarra pedalis Banks, 1931^{i c g}
- Chimarra peineta Blahnik & Holzenthal, 1992^{i c g}
- Chimarra pelaezi Bueno-Soria, 1985^{i c g}
- Chimarra persimilis Banks, 1920^{i c g}
- Chimarra peruviana Flint, 1998^{i c g}
- Chimarra petersorum Flint, 1998^{i c g}
- Chimarra petri Gibbs, 1973^{i c g}
- Chimarra petricola Flint, 1998^{i c g}
- Chimarra peytoni Flint, 1998^{i c g}
- Chimarra philipponi Gibon, 1986^{i c g}
- Chimarra picea Navas, 1924^{i c g}
- Chimarra piliferosa Flint, 1998^{i c g}
- Chimarra pilosella Navás, 1932^{i c g}
- Chimarra pipake Malicky & Chantaramongkol, 1993^{i c g}
- Chimarra piraya Flint, 1983^{i c g}
- Chimarra platyrhina Flint, 1981^{i c g}
- Chimarra plaumanni Flint, 1983^{i c g}
- Chimarra pollex Blahnik & Holzenthal, 1992^{i c g}
- Chimarra pondoensis Barnard, 1941^{i c g}
- Chimarra poolei Flint, 1981^{i c g}
- Chimarra potamophila Mey, 1995^{i c g}
- Chimarra potosi Blahnik, 1998^{i c g}
- Chimarra primula Denning, 1950^{i c g}
- Chimarra prisna Chantaramongkol & Malicky, 1986^{i c g}
- Chimarra prodhoni Gibon, 1985^{i c g}
- Chimarra prolata Blahnik, 1997^{i c g}
- Chimarra protuberans Blahnik, 1998^{i c g}
- Chimarra psychodida ^{g}
- Chimarra puertoricensis Flint, 1964^{i c g}
- Chimarra pulchra Hagen, 1861^{i c g}
- Chimarra pulla Navás, 1932^{i c g}
- Chimarra pumila Banks, 1920^{i c g}
- Chimarra purisca Flint, 1998^{i c g}
- Chimarra pusilla Blahnik, 1997^{i c g}
- Chimarra puya Flint, 1998^{i c g}
- Chimarra pylaea Denning, 1941^{i c g}
- Chimarra quadratiterga Blahnik, 1998^{i c g}
- Chimarra quadrifurcata Botosaneanu, 1994^{i c g}
- Chimarra quadrispinosa Jacquemart & Statzner, 1981^{i c g}
- Chimarra quaternaria Flint, 1971^{i c g}
- Chimarra quina Flint, 1998^{i c g}
- Chimarra quitacalzon Blahnik, 1998^{i c g}
- Chimarra rafita Blahnik, 1998^{i c g}
- Chimarra ram Malicky, 1993^{i c g}
- Chimarra rama Malicky & Chantaramongkol, 1993^{i c g}
- Chimarra ramakien Malicky & Chantaramongkol, 1993^{i c g}
- Chimarra ravanna Malicky & Chantaramongkol, 1993^{i c g}
- Chimarra recta Ulmer, 1930^{i c g}
- Chimarra retrorsa Flint, 1974^{i c g}
- Chimarra rhamphodes Blahnik, 1998^{i c g}
- Chimarra rhodesi Kimmins, 1957^{i c g}
- Chimarra ridleyi Denning, 1941^{i c g}
- Chimarra rifati ^{g}
- Chimarra robynsi (Jacquemart, 1967)^{i c g}
- Chimarra rongliensis ^{g}
- Chimarra rosalesi Flint, 1981^{i c g}
- Chimarra rosavensis ^{g}
- Chimarra rossi Bueno-Soria, 1985^{i c g}
- Chimarra ruficeps Ulmer, 1913^{i c g}
- Chimarra sabrona Kimmins, 1962^{i c g}
- Chimarra sadayu Malicky, 1993^{i c g}
- Chimarra saganeitina Navás, 1932^{i c g}
- Chimarra sandhamma Schmid, 1958^{i c g}
- Chimarra sarophora Flint, 1998^{i c g}
- Chimarra sassandrae Gibon, 1982^{i c g}
- Chimarra saudia Malicky, 1986^{i c g}
- Chimarra schiza Ross, 1959^{i c g}
- Chimarra schlingeri ^{g}
- Chimarra schmidi Kimmins, 1962^{i c g}
- Chimarra schwendingeri Chantaramongkol & Malicky, 1989^{i c g}
- Chimarra scopula Flint, 1974^{i c g}
- Chimarra scopulifera Kimmins, 1957^{i c g}
- Chimarra scopuloides Flint, 1974^{i c g}
- Chimarra securigera Flint, 1998^{i c g}
- Chimarra sedlaceki Sykora, 1967^{i c g}
- Chimarra segmentipennis (Hwang, 1957)^{i c g}
- Chimarra sensillata Flint, 1981^{i c g}
- Chimarra septemlobata Flint, 1991^{i c g}
- Chimarra septifera Flint, 1974^{i c g}
- Chimarra sepulchralis Hagen, 1858^{i c g}
- Chimarra setosa Ross, 1959^{i c g}
- Chimarra shanorum Chantaramongkol & Malicky, 1989^{i c g}
- Chimarra shaowuensis Hwang, 1957^{i c g}
- Chimarra shiva Malicky & Chantaramongkol, 1993^{i c g}
- Chimarra siami Jacquemart, 1979^{i c g}
- Chimarra signata Banks, 1936^{i c g}
- Chimarra sikkimensis ^{g}
- Chimarra simpliciforma Flint, 1971^{i c g}
- Chimarra sinuata Hwang, 1957^{i c g}
- Chimarra sinuosa Kimmins, 1962^{i c g}
- Chimarra sita Malicky & Chantaramongkol, 1993^{i c g}
- Chimarra skaidan Malicky, 1989^{i c g}
- Chimarra skiborskii Mey, 1995^{i c g}
- Chimarra socia Hagen, 1861^{i c g}
- Chimarra solisi Blahnik & Holzenthal, 1992^{i c g}
- Chimarra soloi ^{g}
- Chimarra somereni Marlier, 1951^{i c g}
- Chimarra spangleri Bueno-Soria, 1985^{i c g}
- Chimarra spatulata Ross, 1959^{i c g}
- Chimarra spinifera Kimmins, 1957^{i c g}
- Chimarra spinulifera Flint, 1968^{i c g}
- Chimarra spitzeri Malicky, 1994^{i c g}
- Chimarra straminea Flint, 1998^{i c g}
- Chimarra strongyla Blahnik, 1998^{i c g}
- Chimarra suadulla Malicky & Chantaramongkol, 1993^{i c g}
- Chimarra supanna Malicky, 1993^{i c g}
- Chimarra suryasena Schmid, 1960^{i c g}
- Chimarra suthepensis Chantaramongkol & Malicky, 1989^{i c g}
- Chimarra sylvestris Gibon, 1985^{i c g}
- Chimarra sythoffi Ulmer, 1951^{i c g}
- Chimarra szunyoghyi Olah, 1986^{i c g}
- Chimarra tagalica Banks, 1937^{i c g}
- Chimarra tamba Flint, 1998^{i c g}
- Chimarra tamsi Mosely, 1936^{i c g}
- Chimarra tapanti Blahnik, 1998^{i c g}
- Chimarra tawitawi Malicky, 1994^{i c g}
- Chimarra telihigola Schmid, 1958^{i c g}
- Chimarra teresae Flint, 1998^{i c g}
- Chimarra texana Banks, 1920^{i c g b}
- Chimarra thaiorum Chantaramongkol & Malicky, 1989^{i c g}
- Chimarra thienemanni Ulmer, 1951^{i c g}
- Chimarra tibialis (Navas, 1922)^{i c g}
- Chimarra tipulida ^{g}
- Chimarra toga Malicky & Chantaramongkol, 1993^{i c g}
- Chimarra togoana (Ulmer, 1907)^{i c g}
- Chimarra tokotaai ^{g}
- Chimarra tortuosa Blahnik, 1997^{i c g}
- Chimarra toubaensis Gibon, 1985^{i c g}
- Chimarra travei Jacquemart, 1963^{i c g}
- Chimarra triangularis Kimmins, 1963^{i c g}
- Chimarra triangulata Hsu & Chen, 1996^{i c g}
- Chimarra trispina Jacquemart, 1961^{i c g}
- Chimarra truncatiloba Flint, 1974^{i c g}
- Chimarra tsudai Ross, 1956^{i c g}
- Chimarra tucuna Flint, 1998^{i c g}
- Chimarra uara Flint, 1971^{i c g}
- Chimarra ulmeri Kimmins, 1962^{i c g}
- Chimarra uncata Morse, 1974^{i c g}
- Chimarra uncula Mey, 1998^{i c g}
- Chimarra upia Malicky, 1993^{i c g}
- Chimarra uppita Malicky & Chantaramongkol, 1993^{i c g}
- Chimarra uranka Mosely in Mosely & Kimmins, 1953^{i c g}
- Chimarra uschtu Malicky, 1989^{i c g}
- Chimarra usitatissima Flint, 1971^{i c g}
- Chimarra utahensis Ross, 1938^{i c g}
- Chimarra utra Blahnik, 1998^{i c g}
- Chimarra uvana Kimmins, 1957^{i c g}
- Chimarra uvirana Marlier, 1951^{i c g}
- Chimarra valoma Malicky, 1994^{i c g}
- Chimarra vanuensis ^{g}
- Chimarra vasoudeva Schmid, 1960^{i c g}
- Chimarra veisarensis ^{g}
- Chimarra ventrospina ^{g}
- Chimarra vibena Malicky & Chantaramongkol, 1993^{i c g}
- Chimarra villalobosi Bueno-Soria, 1985^{i c g}
- Chimarra virgencita Blahnik & Holzenthal, 1992^{i c g}
- Chimarra vitiensis ^{g}
- Chimarra vuda ^{g}
- Chimarra waensis Gibon, 1985^{i c g}
- Chimarra wiharawela Schmid, 1958^{i c g}
- Chimarra wilcuma Blahnik, 1998^{i c g}
- Chimarra wilsoni Flint, 1967^{i c g}
- Chimarra woldai Blahnik, 1998^{i c g}
- Chimarra wushikangensis Hsu & Chen, 1996^{i c g}
- Chimarra xenillion Neboiss, 1986^{i c g}
- Chimarra xingu Blahnik, 1997^{i c g}
- Chimarra xus Blahnik, 1998^{i c g}
- Chimarra yaloma Malicky, 1994^{i c g}
- Chimarra yanura Blahnik & Holzenthal, 1992^{i c g}
- Chimarra yaorum Chantaramongkol & Malicky, 1989^{i c g}
- Chimarra yaoshanensis Hwang, 1957^{i c g}
- Chimarra ypsilon Flint, 1983^{i c g}
- Chimarra yskal Malicky, 1989^{i c g}
- Chimarra zagroensis Chvojka, 1996^{i c g}
- Chimarra zamora Blahnik, 1998^{i c g}
- Chimarra zoria Mosely, 1939^{i c g}

Data sources: i = ITIS, c = Catalogue of Life, g = GBIF, b = Bugguide.net
