= Chimarra antigua =

Scientific classification
- Kingdom: Animalia
- Phylum: Arthropoda
- Clade: Pancrustacea
- Class: Insecta
- Order: Trichoptera
- Family: Philopotamidae
- Genus: Chimarra
- Species: C. antigua

Binomial name
- Chimarra antigua Flint, 1967

Species of insect

Chimarra antigua is a species of fingernet caddisfly in the family Philopotamidae. It is found in Middle Americas.
