= List of Wormaldia species =

This is a list of 100 species in Wormaldia, a genus of fingernet caddisflies in the family Philopotamidae.

== Wormaldia species ==
- Wormaldia algirica Lestage, 1925^{i c g}
- Wormaldia ambigua Navas, 1916^{i c g}
- Wormaldia amyda Ross, 1956^{g}
- Wormaldia anilla (Ross, 1941)^{i c g}
- Wormaldia arcopa Denning in Denning & Sykora, 1966^{i c g}
- Wormaldia arizonensis (Ling, 1938)^{i c g}
- Wormaldia arriba Sipahiler, 1999^{i c g}
- Wormaldia artillac Sipahiler, 1999^{i c g}
- Wormaldia asterusia Malicky, 1972^{g}
- Wormaldia balcanica Kumanski, 1979^{i c g}
- Wormaldia beaumonti Schmid, 1952^{g}
- Wormaldia bilamellata Sun, 1997^{i c g}
- Wormaldia bulgarica Novak, 1971^{i c g}
- Wormaldia cantabrica Gonzalez & Botosaneanu, 1983^{i c g}
- Wormaldia charalambi Malicky, 1980^{i c g}
- Wormaldia chinensis (Ulmer, 1932)^{i c g}
- Wormaldia clavella Mey, 1995^{i c g}
- Wormaldia congina Malicky & Chantaramongkol, 1993^{i c g}
- Wormaldia copiosa (McLachlan, 1868)^{i c g}
- Wormaldia coreana Kumanski, 1992^{i c g}
- Wormaldia cornuta Bueno-Soria & Holzenthal, 1986^{i c g}
- Wormaldia corvina (McLachlan, 1884)^{i c g}
- Wormaldia dampfi Ross & King in Ross, 1956^{i c g}
- Wormaldia dissita Gibbs, 1973^{i c g}
- Wormaldia dorsata Ross & King in Ross, 1956^{i c g}
- Wormaldia echinata Tobias, 1995^{i c g}
- Wormaldia endonima Ross & King in Ross, 1956^{i c g}
- Wormaldia ephestion Schmid, 1991^{i c g}
- Wormaldia esperonis Ross & King in Ross, 1956^{i c g}
- Wormaldia extensa Kimmins, 1955^{i c g}
- Wormaldia fletcheri Kimmins, 1959^{i c g}
- Wormaldia fujinoensis Kobayashi, 1980^{i c g}
- Wormaldia gabriella (Banks, 1930)^{i c g}
- Wormaldia gardensis Sipahiler, 1999^{i c g}
- Wormaldia gesugta Schmid, 1968^{i c g}
- Wormaldia hamata Denning, 1951^{i c g}
- Wormaldia hemsinensis Sipahiler, 1987^{i c g}
- Wormaldia ikizdere Sipahiler, 2000^{i c g}
- Wormaldia insignis (Martynov, 1912)^{i c g}
- Wormaldia inthanonensis Malicky & Chantaramongkol, 1993^{i c g}
- Wormaldia joosti Kumanski, 1980^{i c g}
- Wormaldia juliani Kumanski, 1979^{i c g}
- Wormaldia kadowakii Kobayashi, 1980^{i c g}
- Wormaldia kakopetros Malicky, 1972^{g}
- Wormaldia kakopteros Malicky, 1972^{i c g}
- Wormaldia khourmai Schmid, 1959^{i c g}
- Wormaldia kimminsi Botosaneanu, 1960^{i c g}
- Wormaldia kyana (Mosely, 1939)^{i c g}
- Wormaldia lacerna Denning, 1958^{i c g}
- Wormaldia langohri Botosaneanu & Giudicelli, 2001^{g}
- Wormaldia laona Denning, 1989^{i c g}
- Wormaldia longicerca Kumanski, 1992^{i c g}
- Wormaldia longicornuta Mey, 1996^{i c g}
- Wormaldia longispina Tian & Li in Chen, 1993^{i c g}
- Wormaldia luma Bueno-Soria & Holzenthal, 1986^{i c g}
- Wormaldia lusitanica Gonzalez & Botosaneanu, 1983^{i c g}
- Wormaldia matagalpa Flint, 1995^{i c g}
- Wormaldia mediana McLachlan, 1878^{i c g}
- Wormaldia melanion Schmid, 1991^{i c g}
- Wormaldia moesta (Banks, 1914)^{i c b}
- Wormaldia moselyi Kimmins, 1953^{g}
- Wormaldia muoihai Malicky, 1995^{i c g}
- Wormaldia muoimot Malicky, 1995^{i c g}
- Wormaldia nigrorosea Schmid, 1991^{i c g}
- Wormaldia niiensis Kobayashi, 1985^{i c g}
- Wormaldia occidea (Ross, 1938)^{i c g}
- Wormaldia occipitalis (Pictet, 1834)^{i c g}
- Wormaldia oconee Morse in Morse, Hamilton & Hoffman, 1989^{i c g}
- Wormaldia pachita Denning, 1956^{i c g}
- Wormaldia palma Flint, 1991^{i c g}
- Wormaldia pauliani Ross, 1956^{i c g}
- Wormaldia planae Ross & King in Ross, 1956^{i c g}
- Wormaldia prolixa Flint, 1991^{i c g}
- Wormaldia pulla (McLachlan, 1878)^{i c g}
- Wormaldia quadriphylla Sun in Yang, Sun & Wang, 1997^{i c g}
- Wormaldia recta (Ulmer, 1930)^{i c}
- Wormaldia relicta (Martynov, 1935)^{i c g}
- Wormaldia rufiventris Ulmer, 1908^{i c g}
- Wormaldia saekiensis Kobayashi, 1980^{i c g}
- Wormaldia saldetica Botosaneanu & Gonzalez, 1984^{i c g}
- Wormaldia serratosioi Vaillant, 1974^{i c g}
- Wormaldia shawnee (Ross, 1938)^{i c g}
- Wormaldia simulans Kimmins, 1955^{i c g}
- Wormaldia sinocornuta Mey, 1996^{i c g}
- Wormaldia spinifera Hwang, 1957^{i c g}
- Wormaldia spinosa Ross, 1956^{g}
- Wormaldia strota (Ross, 1938)^{i c g}
- Wormaldia subnigra McLachlan, 1865^{i c g}
- Wormaldia sumuharana Kobayashi, 1980^{i c g}
- Wormaldia tarasca Bueno-Soria & Holzenthal, 1986^{i c g}
- Wormaldia therapion Schmid, 1991^{i c g}
- Wormaldia thyria Denning, 1950^{i c g}
- Wormaldia triangulifera McLachlan, 1878^{i c g}
- Wormaldia uonumana Kobayashi, 1980^{i c g}
- Wormaldia vargai Malicky, 1981^{i c g}
- Wormaldia variegata Mosely, 1930^{i c g}
- Wormaldia viganoi Moretti & Taticchi, 1992^{g}
- Wormaldia yakuensis Kobayashi, 1980^{i c g}
- Wormaldia yavuzi Sipahiler, 1996^{i c g}
- Wormaldia yunotakiensis Kobayashi, 1980^{i c g}

Data sources: i = ITIS, c = Catalogue of Life, g = GBIF, b = Bugguide.net
