= Chimarra texana =

Scientific classification
- Kingdom: Animalia
- Phylum: Arthropoda
- Clade: Pancrustacea
- Class: Insecta
- Order: Trichoptera
- Family: Philopotamidae
- Genus: Chimarra
- Species: C. texana

Binomial name
- Chimarra texana Banks, 1920

Synonyms
- Chimarra betteni Denning, 1941

Species of caddisfly

Chimarra texana is a species of fingernet caddisfly in the family Philopotamidae. It is found in North America.
