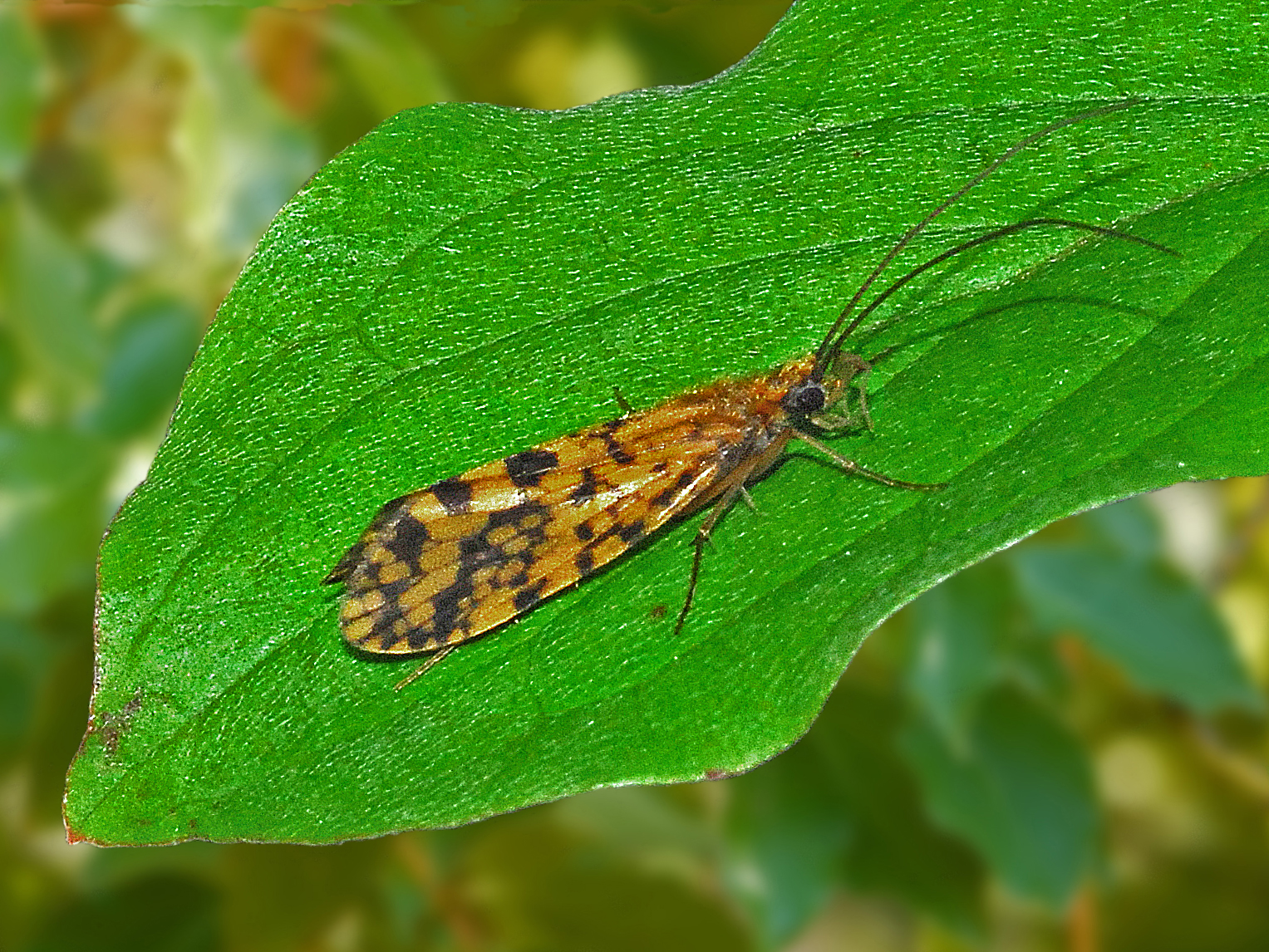
- Adult of Philopotamus montanus montanus

Scientific classification
- Kingdom: Animalia
- Phylum: Arthropoda
- Clade: Pancrustacea
- Class: Insecta
- Order: Trichoptera
- Family: Philopotamidae
- Genus: Philopotamus
- Species: P. montanus

Binomial name
- Philopotamus montanus (Donovan, 1813)

Synonyms
- Philopotamus scopulorum Stephens, 1836; Phryganea charpentieri Zetterstedt, 1840; Philopotamus tigrinus Brauer, 1857

= Philopotamus montanus =

Species of caddisfly

Philopotamus montanus, common name yellow spotted sedge, is a species of caddisfly belonging to the family Philopotamidae.

== Subspecies ==
Subspecies include:

- Philopotamus montanus arvernicus F. Vaillant, 1974
- Philopotamus montanus caurelensis Gonzalez & Terra, 1979
- Philopotamus montanus cesareus McLachlan, 1884
- Philopotamus montanus chrysopterus Morton, 1884
- Philopotamus montanus insularis R. McLachlan, 1878
- Philopotamus montanus montanus (Donovan, 1813)
- Philopotamus montanus perversus McLachlan, 1884
- Philopotamus montanus pyrenaicus McLachlan, 1878
- Philopotamus montanus scoticus McLachlan, 1862
- Philopotamus montanus siculus H.A. Hagen, 1860

== Distribution and habitat ==
This species is native to Europe. It extends over whole Europe eastwards to Northwestern and Northern Russia. The aquatic stages of Philopotamus montanus can be found mainly in small rivers in uplands, in brooks and rivulets and in stony streams, often with rapids, as this species prefers high current velocities.

== Description ==
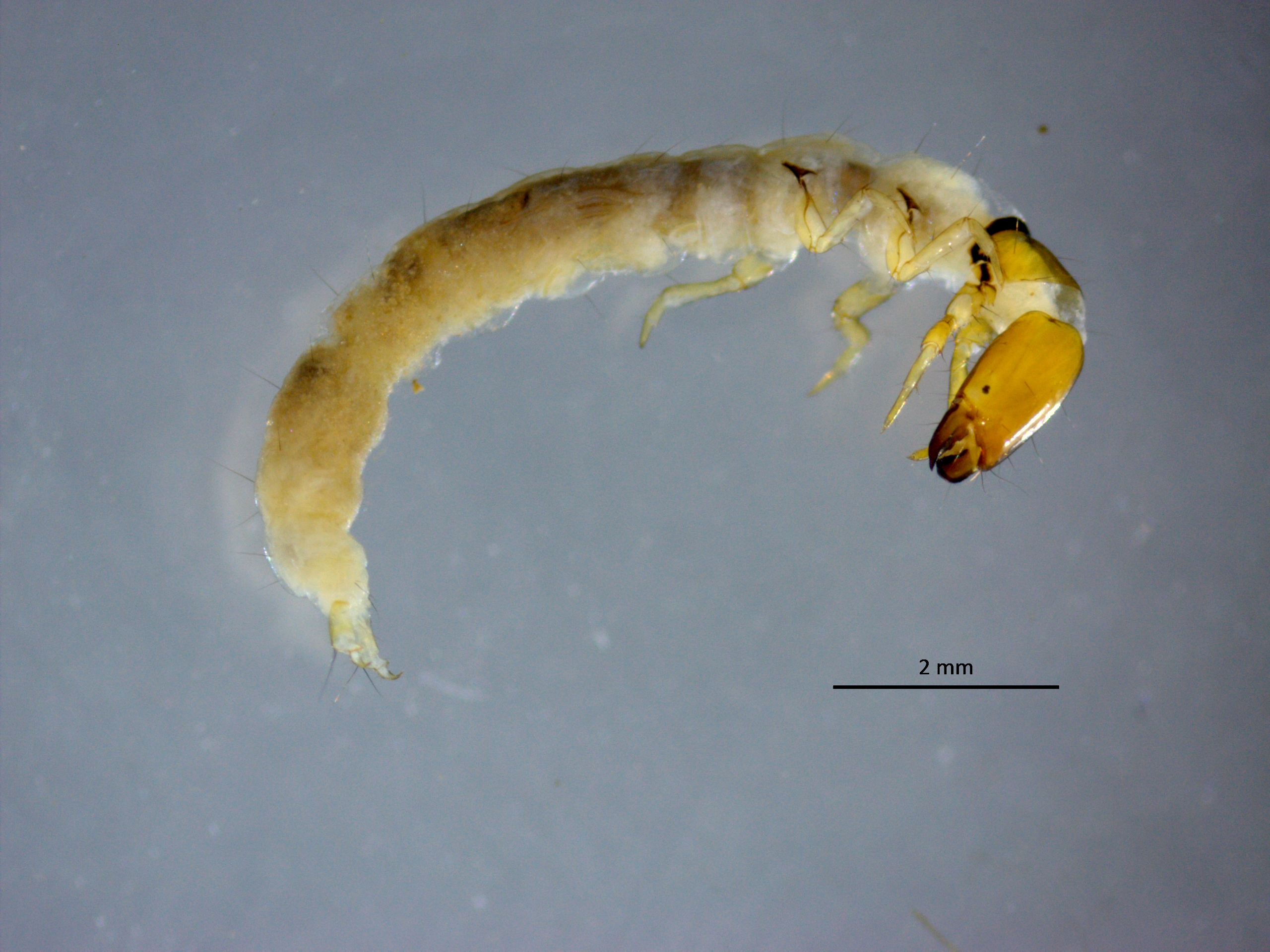
Larva of Philopotamus montanus

Philopotamus montanus can reach a body length of about 4–9 mm (0.16–0.35 in), with a wingspan of about 12–20 mm (0.47–0.79 in). These medium sized caddisflies are usually light brown or yellowish colored, with many dark brown spots.

== Biology ==
Philopotamus montanus has one generation a year (univoltine). Larvae build long, tubular nets attached to rocks. They are filter-feeders, mainly feeding on small, particulate matter, fine particles and diatoms. Adults of these caddisflies are on the wing from February to October.

== Bibliography ==
- Barnard, P. and Ross, E. (2012) The Adult Trichoptera (Caddisflies) of Britain and Ireland. RES Handbook Volume 1, Part 17.
- Botosaneanu L., Cianficconi F., Moretti G.P., 1986 - Autumnal aspects of the caddisfly fauna (Trichoptera) of Sicily, with description of a remarkable relict species. Mitteil. Entom. Gesell. Basel, 36: 145-154.
- Botosaneanu L., Schmid F., 1973 - Les Trichoptères du Muséum d'Histoire Naturelle de Genève. Revue suisse de Zoologie, 80(1): 221-256.
- Edington, J.M. and Hildrew, A.G. (1995) A Revised Key to the Caseless Caddis Larvae of the British Isles: with notes on their ecology. Freshwater Biological Association Special Publication No. 53.
- Graf, W., Murphy, J., Dahl, J., Zamora-Muñoz, C. and López-Rodríguez, M.J. (2008) Distribution and Ecological Preferences of European Freshwater Species. Volume 1: Trichoptera. Astrid Schmidt-Kloiber & Daniel Hering (eds). Pensoft, Sofia-Moscow.
- O’Connor, J.P. (2015) A Catalogue and Atlas of the Caddisflies (Trichoptera) of Ireland. Occasional Publication of the Irish Biogeographical Society, No. 11.
