= Gunungiella =

Scientific classification
- Kingdom: Animalia
- Phylum: Arthropoda
- Clade: Pancrustacea
- Class: Insecta
- Order: Trichoptera
- Family: Philopotamidae
- Genus: Gunungiella; Ulmer, 1913

Species
- See text

Genus of caddisflies

Gunungiella is a genus of caddisfly that belongs to the family Philopotamidae (fat-net caddisflies). Members of this genus have been found throughout the Oriental realm and surrounding regions including India, Pakistan, China, Sri Lanka, Malaysia, Indonesia, Vietnam, Thailand and the Philippines.

The genitalia of species of this genus are highly varied making taxonomic classification difficult.

== Taxonomy ==
Gunungiella is a caddisfly that belongs to the family Philopotamidae within the subfamily Philopotaminae. This genus is considered to be a highly differentiated lineage of Philopotamids being derived from Wormaldia.

=== Species ===
Currently, there are more than 80 species that have been described. A selected list of species can be found below:

- Gunungiella aanafizzga Malicky, 1993
- Gunungiella arinada Malicky, 1995
- Gunungiella bacmaensis Johanson & Pham, 2026
- Gunungiella balsahana Mey, 1998
- Gunungiella bongai Oláh & Malicky, 2010
- Gunungiella cao Oláh & Malicky, 2010
- Gunungiella dung Oláh & Malicky, 2010
- Gunungiella dvatrimchi Schmid, 1968
- Gunungiella dvitiya Schmid, 1968
- Gunungiella ekavimchi Schmid, 1968
- Gunungiella flabellata Peng, Ge & Sun, 2022
- Gunungiella guni Malicky, 2009
- Gunungiella hueensis Johanson & Pham, 2026
- Gunungiella kakatua Huisman, 1993
- Gunungiella lencao Oláh & Malicky, 2010
- Gunungiella madakumbura Schmid, 1958
- Gunungiella nimitra Chantaramongkol & Malicky, 1986
- Gunungiella obendio Oláh & Malicky, 2010
- Gunungiella phulocensis Johanson & Pham, 2026
- Gunungiella paruh Huisman, 1993
- Gunungiella sosau Oláh & Malicky, 2010
- Gunungiella thuba Oláh & Malicky, 2010
- Gunungiella wangi Peng, Ge & Sun, 2022
- Gunungiella vietnamensis Johanson & Pham, 2026
