= Wormaldia moesta =

Scientific classification
- Kingdom: Animalia
- Phylum: Arthropoda
- Clade: Pancrustacea
- Class: Insecta
- Order: Trichoptera
- Family: Philopotamidae
- Genus: Wormaldia
- Species: W. moesta

Binomial name
- Wormaldia moesta (Banks, 1914)

Species of caddisfly

Wormaldia moesta is a species of fingernet caddisfly in the family Philopotamidae.
