= Chimarra abacensis =

Scientific classification
- Kingdom: Animalia
- Phylum: Arthropoda
- Clade: Pancrustacea
- Class: Insecta
- Order: Trichoptera
- Family: Philopotamidae
- Genus: Chimarra
- Species: C. abacensis

Binomial name
- Chimarra abacensis Johanson & Olah, 2012

Species of insect

Chimarra abacensis is a species of fingernet caddisfly in the family Philopotamidae.
