= Chimarra aneca =

Scientific classification
- Kingdom: Animalia
- Phylum: Arthropoda
- Clade: Pancrustacea
- Class: Insecta
- Order: Trichoptera
- Family: Philopotamidae
- Genus: Chimarra
- Species: C. aneca

Binomial name
- Chimarra aneca Malicky & Chantaramongkol, 1993

Species of insect

Chimarra anecas are a species of fingernet caddisfly in the family Philopotamidae. These insects are found in freshwater habitats and their larvae construct cases made of sand, gravel, or plant debris. They play an important role in aquatic ecosystems, serving as a food source for fish and other aquatic organisms. They are commonly found in South Asia.
