= Chimarra alleni =

Scientific classification
- Kingdom: Animalia
- Phylum: Arthropoda
- Clade: Pancrustacea
- Class: Insecta
- Order: Trichoptera
- Family: Philopotamidae
- Genus: Chimarra
- Species: C. alleni

Binomial name
- Chimarra alleni Chantaramongkol & Malicky, 1989

Species of insect

Chimarra alleni is a species of fingernet caddisfly in the family Philopotamidae. It is found in South Asia.
