= Chimarra adella =

Scientific classification
- Kingdom: Animalia
- Phylum: Arthropoda
- Clade: Pancrustacea
- Class: Insecta
- Order: Trichoptera
- Family: Philopotamidae
- Genus: Chimarra
- Species: C. adella

Binomial name
- Chimarra adella Denning, 1952

Species of insect

Chimarra adella is a species of fingernet caddisfly in the family Philopotamidae. It is found in North America, typically in the United States.
