= Chimarra antilliana =

Scientific classification
- Kingdom: Animalia
- Phylum: Arthropoda
- Clade: Pancrustacea
- Class: Insecta
- Order: Trichoptera
- Family: Philopotamidae
- Genus: Chimarra
- Species: C. antilliana

Binomial name
- Chimarra antilliana Flint, 1968

Species of insect

Chimarra antilliana is a genus of fingernet caddisflies in the family Philopotamidae. It is found in Dominica.
