= Chimarra argeia =

Scientific classification
- Kingdom: Animalia
- Phylum: Arthropoda
- Clade: Pancrustacea
- Class: Insecta
- Order: Trichoptera
- Family: Philopotamidae
- Genus: Chimarra
- Species: C. argeia

Binomial name
- Chimarra argeia Malicky & Chantaramongkol, 1997

Species of insect

Chimarra argeia is a species of fingernet caddisfly in the family Philopotamidae. It is found in South Asia, most commonly Thailand.
