= Chimarra amarganth =

Scientific classification
- Kingdom: Animalia
- Phylum: Arthropoda
- Clade: Pancrustacea
- Class: Insecta
- Order: Trichoptera
- Family: Philopotamidae
- Genus: Chimarra
- Species: C. amarganth

Binomial name
- Chimarra amarganth Malicky, 1989

Species of insect

Chimarra amarganth is a species of fingernet caddisfly in the family Philopotamidae. It is found in Europe and Northern Asia.
