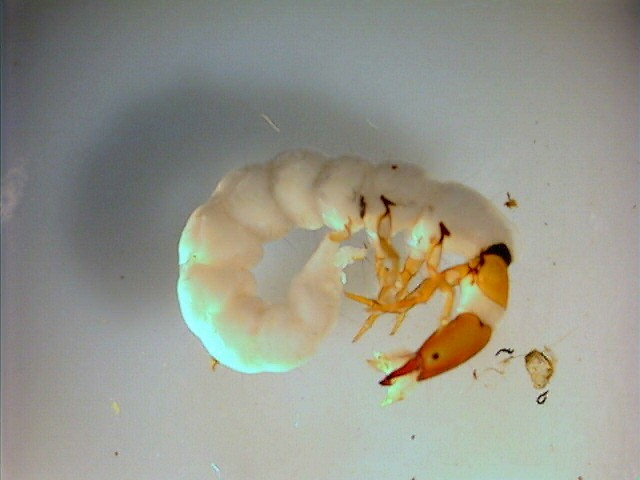

Scientific classification
- Kingdom: Animalia
- Phylum: Arthropoda
- Clade: Pancrustacea
- Class: Insecta
- Order: Trichoptera
- Family: Philopotamidae
- Genus: Chimarra
- Species: C. aterrima

Binomial name
- Chimarra aterrima Hagen, 1861

Synonyms
- Chimarra buenoi Navás, 1934

= Chimarra aterrima =

Species of insect

Chimarra aterrima is a species of fingernet caddisfly in the family Philopotamidae. It is found in North America.
