= Chimarra aciculata =

Scientific classification
- Kingdom: Animalia
- Phylum: Arthropoda
- Clade: Pancrustacea
- Class: Insecta
- Order: Trichoptera
- Family: Philopotamidae
- Genus: Chimarra
- Species: C. aciculata

Binomial name
- Chimarra aciculata Morse, 1974

Species of insect

Chimarra aciculata is a species of fingernet caddisfly in the family Philopotamidae. It is found in Southern Africa.
