= Chimarra obscura =

Scientific classification
- Kingdom: Animalia
- Phylum: Arthropoda
- Clade: Pancrustacea
- Class: Insecta
- Order: Trichoptera
- Family: Philopotamidae
- Genus: Chimarra
- Species: C. obscura

Binomial name
- Chimarra obscura (Walker, 1852)

Synonyms
- Chimarra plutonis (Banks, 1911)

Species of caddisfly

Chimarra obscura is a species of fingernet caddisfly in the family Philopotamidae. It is found in North America.
