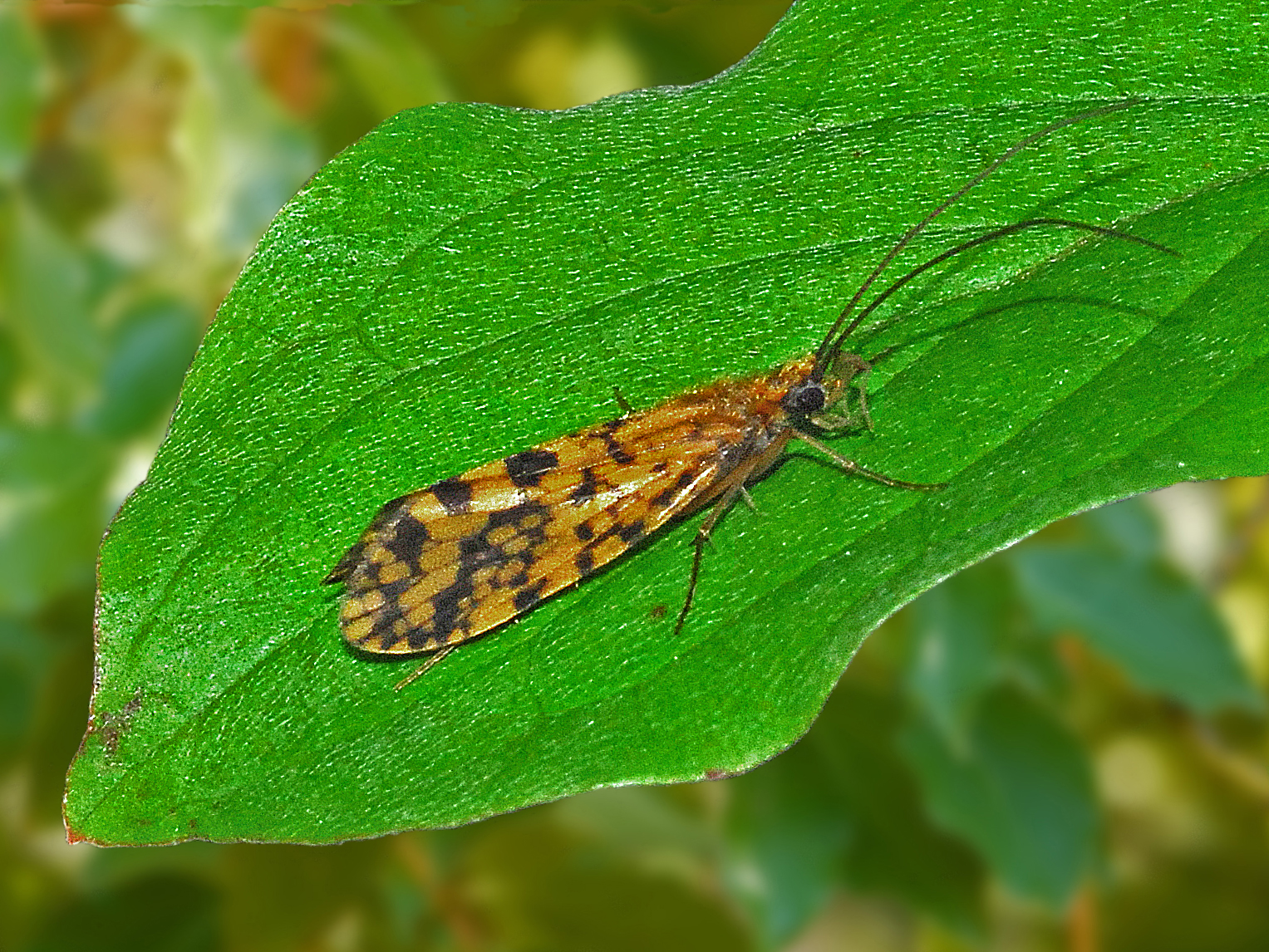
- Adult of Philopotamus montanus montanus

Scientific classification
- Kingdom: Animalia
- Phylum: Arthropoda
- Clade: Pancrustacea
- Class: Insecta
- Order: Trichoptera
- Family: Philopotamidae
- Subfamily: Philopotaminae
- Genus: Philopotamus; Stephens, 1829

= Philopotamus =

Genus of caddisflies

Philopotamus is a genus of insects in the family Philopotamidae.

The genus was described in 1829 by Stephens.

The genus has cosmopolitan distribution.

Species:

- Philopotamus montanus (Donovan 1813)
