= Dolophilodes distinctus =

Scientific classification
- Kingdom: Animalia
- Phylum: Arthropoda
- Clade: Pancrustacea
- Class: Insecta
- Order: Trichoptera
- Family: Philopotamidae
- Genus: Dolophilodes
- Species: D. distinctus

Binomial name
- Dolophilodes distinctus (Walker, 1852)

Species of caddisfly

Dolophilodes distinctus is a species of caddisfly in the Philopotamidae family. The larvae are found in streams in eastern North America where they build net-like retreats.

== Description ==
Adult caddisflies are small moth-like insects; the adult Dolophilodes distinctus has brown wings with darker brown markings. Adult females emerging in summer are winged while those emerging in March are often brachypterous (have vestigial wings). These sometimes breed on the snow that is lying on the ground at this time of year.

== Distribution ==
Dolophilodes distinctus is native to eastern North America. It is a common species whose range extends from Minnesota and Newfoundland southwards to Georgia. They are usually found in clear montane streams.

== Ecology ==
Like other members of Philopotamidae, the larvae of D. distinctus is free-living and builds a net to intercept the fine organic particles drifting downstream. In streams in Ontario, this species was found in shallow streams with small pools joined by riffles. In one stream with clear hard water, the stream bed was limestone gravel interspersed with sand and patches of clay, and in a different, brown-water, stream it was granite gravel mixed with assorted size cobbles. In the limestone gravel location, larvae at various stages of development were found to be present all year, with peak numbers in August, and emergence occurring for much of the time between late June and late August; some emergence possibly happened in mid-winter as well.

The larva builds a net consisting of an elongated sac made of a meshwork of fine silk strands. The longitudinal strands are stout and the transverse strands are finer and closer together. In the final instar, the sac may be up to 60 mm (2.4 in) long and 4.5 mm (0.2 in) in diameter, with extra silk threads at the upstream end to anchor it to the stream bed and nearby rocks. It has been estimated that the net made by the final instar larva is composed of over a kilometre of silk and has 100 million rectangular mesh openings.

The net is usually built underneath a rock where a current of water flows through it. The downstream end of the net is free to move and has an opening to permit a respiratory current to flow through, and groups of nets are often built besides each other. The larva moves about inside the net and feeds on the fine organic matter and diatoms that get caught in the mesh structure. Much of its time is spent scraping this deposit off the net with specialised mouthparts.
