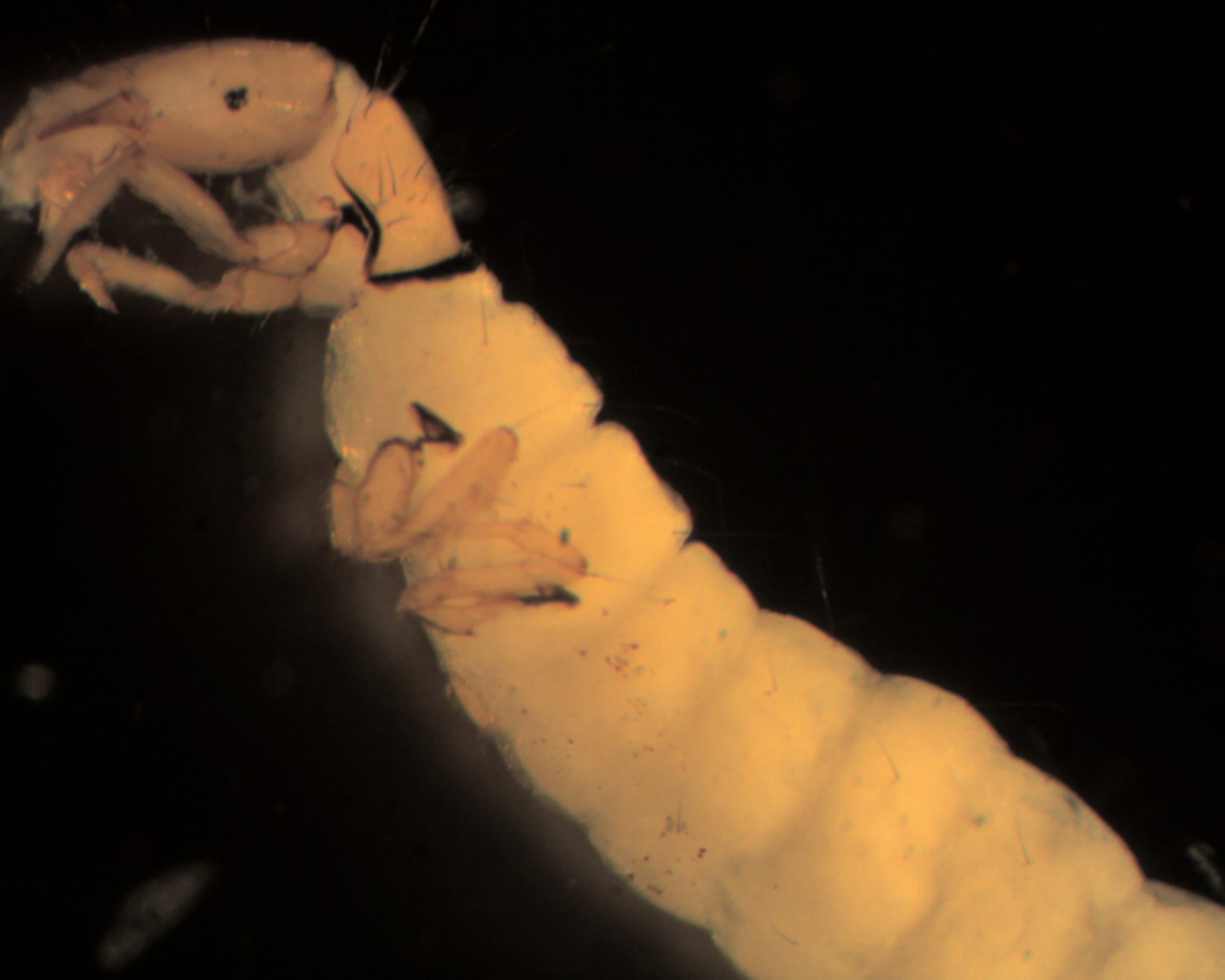

Scientific classification
- Kingdom: Animalia
- Phylum: Arthropoda
- Clade: Pancrustacea
- Class: Insecta
- Order: Trichoptera
- Family: Philopotamidae
- Genus: Wormaldia; McLachlan, 1865

Diversity
- at least 140 species

Synonyms
- Dolophilus McLachlan, 1868

= Wormaldia =

Wormaldia Temporal range: Cenomanian–Recent

Genus of caddisflies

Wormaldia is a genus of fingernet caddisflies in the family Philopotamidae. There are more than 140 described species in Wormaldia. Fossil species have been described from the Late Cretaceous Burmese amber of Myanmar.

== See also ==
- List of Wormaldia species
