= Middle America (Americas) =

Subregion in the Northern Hemisphere tropics of the Americas

Coordinates: 17.4000°N 91.0000°W

- Area: 2,728,827 km^{2} (1,053,606 sq mi)
- Population (2022): 224,017,764
- Countries: 21: Antigua and Barbuda; Bahamas; Barbados; Belize; Costa Rica; Cuba; Dominica; Dominican Republic; El Salvador; Grenada; Guatemala; Haiti; Honduras; Jamaica; Mexico; Nicaragua; Panama; Saint Kitts and Nevis; Saint Lucia; Saint Vincent and the Grenadines; Trinidad and Tobago
- Dependencies: 18: Anguilla (UK); Aruba (NL); Bonaire (NL); British Virgin Islands (UK); Cayman Islands (UK); Curaçao (NL); Guadeloupe (FR); Martinique (FR); Montserrat (UK); Navassa Island (Note: Administered by the United States, claimed by Haiti.) (US); Puerto Rico (US); Saba (NL); Saint Barthélemy (FR); Saint Martin (FR); Sint Eustatius (NL); Sint Maarten (NL); Turks and Caicos Islands (UK); U.S. Virgin Islands (US)
- GDP: $1.416 229 trillion (PPP, 2005 est.)
- Major languages: Spanish, English, French, Mayan, Nahuatl, Antillean Creole, Haitian Creole, and others
- Time zones: UTC−04:00 (Barbados) to UTC−08:00 (Baja California)
- Largest cities: 10 largest cities in Middle America (2015): 1. Mexico City; 2. (Cuba) Havana; 3. (Mexico) Ecatepec de Morelos; 4. (Mexico) Guadalajara; 5. (Mexico) Puebla; 6. (Mexico) Juárez; 7. (Mexico) León; 8. (Mexico) Tijuana; 9. (Honduras) Tegucigalpa; 10. (Mexico) Zapopan

Middle America is a subregion in the Northern Hemisphere tropics of the Americas. It usually includes Mexico, the seven countries of Central America, and the 13 island countries and 18 territories of the Caribbean. Together with Northern America, they form the continent of North America.

Colombia and Venezuela of Caribbean South America are sometimes included in this subregion. The Caribbean is occasionally excluded from this subregion while The Guianas are infrequently included.

== Geography ==
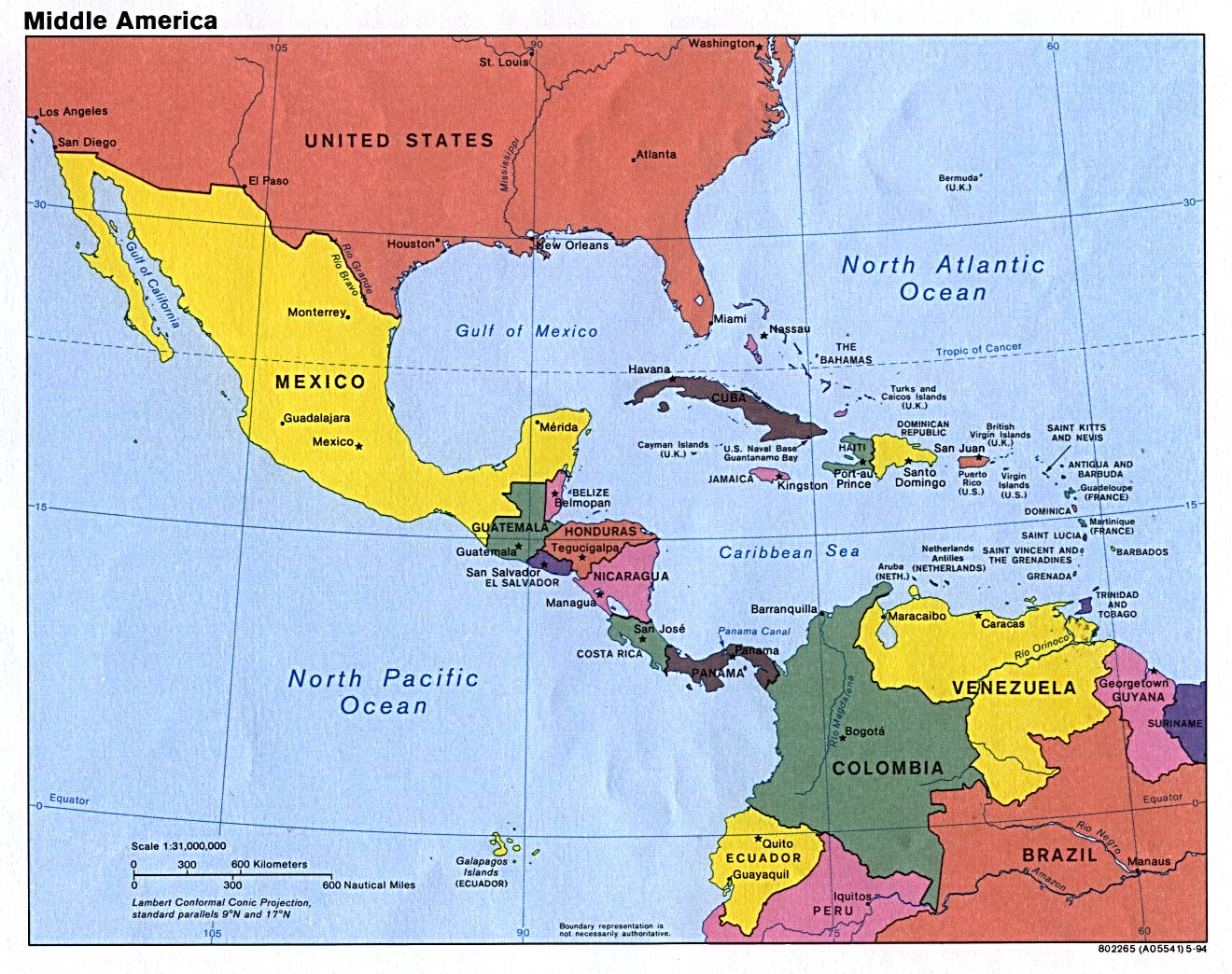
Political map of Middle America

Physiographically, Middle America marks the territorial transition between Northern America and South America, connecting yet separating the two. On the west, the Middle American mainland comprises the tapering, isthmian tract of the American landmass between the southern Rocky Mountains in the southern United States and the northern tip of the Andes in Colombia, separating the Pacific Ocean on the west and the Atlantic Ocean (viz. the Gulf of Mexico and Caribbean Sea) on the east, while the Greater and Lesser Antilles form an island arc in the east. The region developed subaerially southward from North America as a complex volcanic arc-trench system during the Early Cretaceous period, eventually forming the land bridge during the Pliocene epoch when its southern end (at Panama) collided with South America through tectonic action.

== Countries and territories ==
Small island nations are excluded. Puerto Rico is in italics due to not being independent.

| Country / Territory | Population | Area (km^{2}) | Density (people per km^{2}) | Capital |
|---|---|---|---|---|
| Mexico | 127,575,529 | 1,943,945 | 65.6 | Mexico City |
| Guatemala | 17,581,472 | 107,158 | 164.1 | Guatemala City |
| Cuba | 11,333,483 | 109,883 | 103.1 | Havana |
| Haiti | 11,263,770 | 27,557 | 408.7 | Port-au-Prince |
| Dominican Republic | 10,738,958 | 48,329 | 222.2 | Santo Domingo |
| Honduras | 9,746,117 | 111,888 | 87.1 | Tegucigalpa |
| Nicaragua | 6,545,502 | 119,994 | 54.5 | Managua |
| El Salvador | 6,453,553 | 20,720 | 311.5 | San Salvador |
| Costa Rica | 5,047,561 | 51,049 | 98.9 | San José |
| Panama | 4,246,439 | 74,333 | 57.1 | Panama City |
| Jamaica | 2,948,279 | 10,831 | 272.2 | Kingston |
| Puerto Rico | 3,205,691 | 9,100 | 352.2 | San Juan |
| Belize | 390,353 | 22,805 | 17.1 | Belmopan |
| Bahamas | 389,482 | 9,997 | 39.0 | Nassau |
| Total | 217,193,906 | 2,667,589 | 81.4 | |

== Other uses ==
Occasionally, the term Middle America is used synonymously with Central America (compare with Middle Africa and Central Africa). In English, the term is uncommonly used as a synonym of the term Mesoamerica (or Meso-America), which generally refers to an ancient culture region situated in Middle America extending roughly from central Mexico to northern Costa Rica. In addition, some residents of the region (e.g., Costa Ricans and Nicaraguans) may be referred to as Meso-Americans or Central Americans, but not, however, as Middle Americans, which refers to a particular constituency in the United States.

== See also ==
- Americas (terminology)
- Aridoamerica
- Latin America and the Caribbean
- Middle America Trench
- Oasisamerica
- Southern Cone
- West Indies
