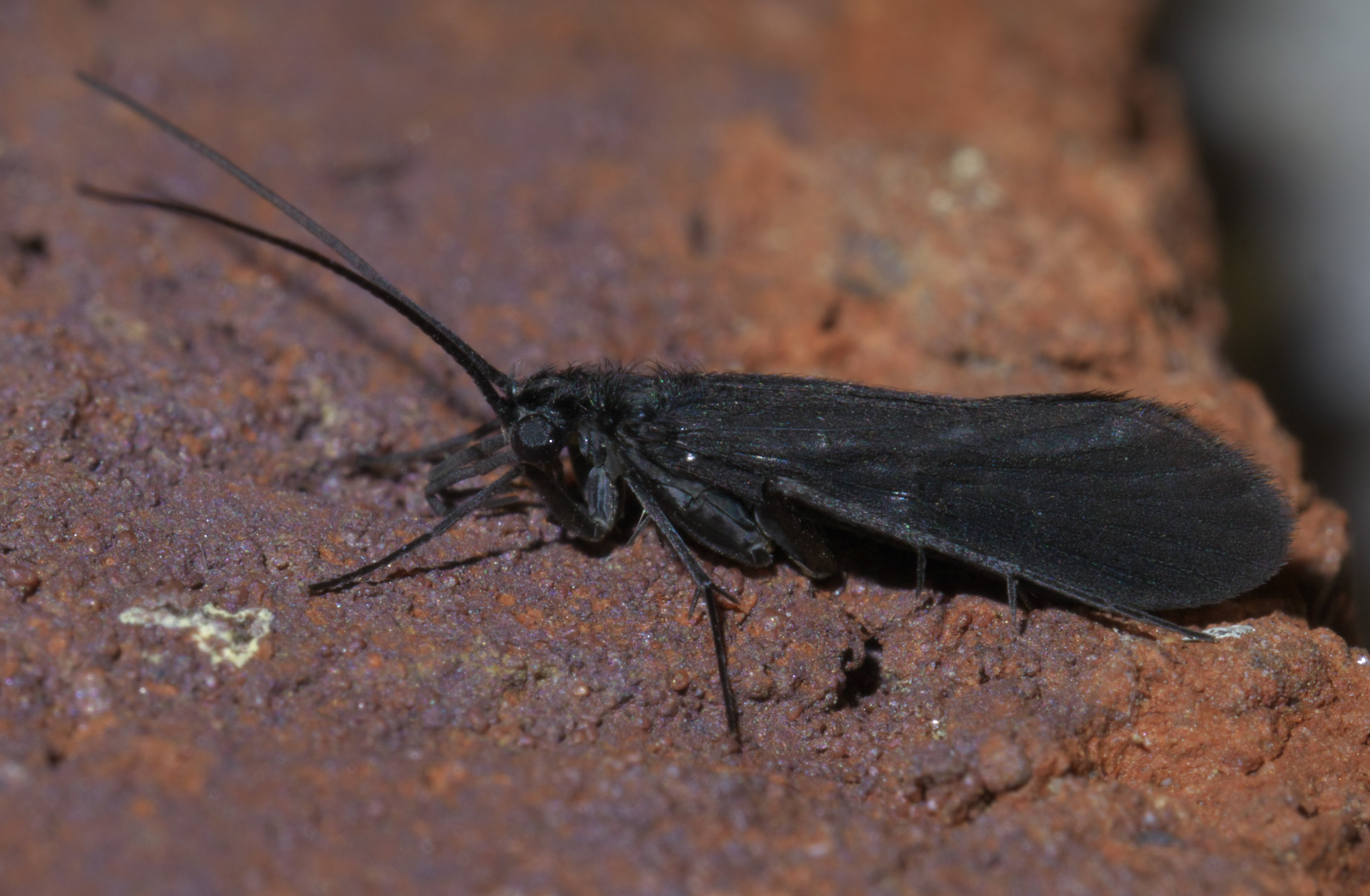

Scientific classification
- Kingdom: Animalia
- Phylum: Arthropoda
- Clade: Pancrustacea
- Class: Insecta
- Order: Trichoptera
- Family: Philopotamidae
- Genus: Chimarra; Stephens, 1829

Subgenera
- Chimarra (Chimarra) Stephens, 1829; Chimarra (Chimarrita) Blahnik, 1997; Chimarra (Curgia) Walker, 1860

Diversity
- at least 630 species

= Chimarra =

Genus of caddisflies

Chimarra is a genus of little black caddisflies in the family Philopotamidae. There are more than 630 described species in Chimarra.

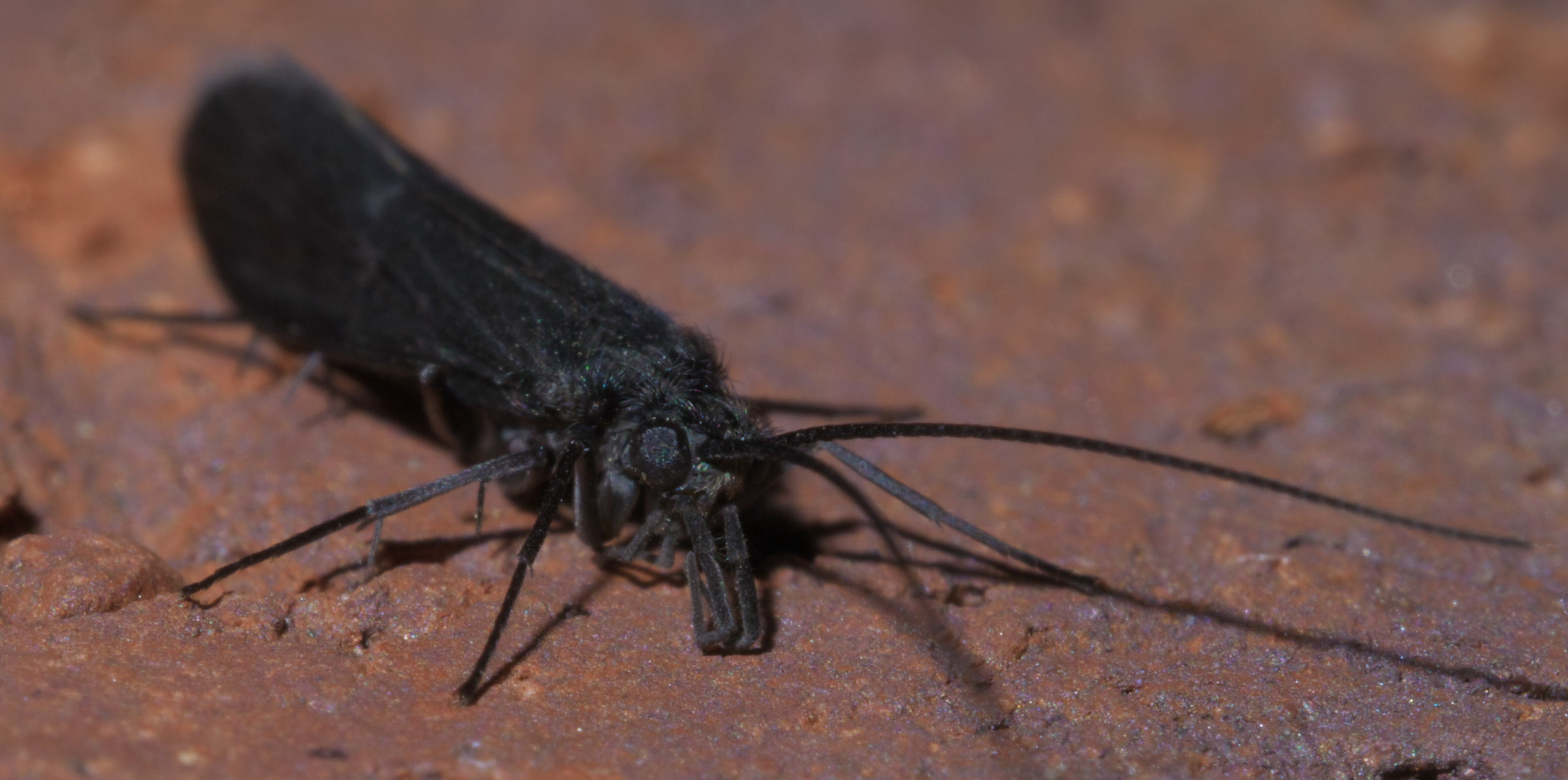
Little black caddisflies, Chimarra

== See also ==
- List of Chimarra species
