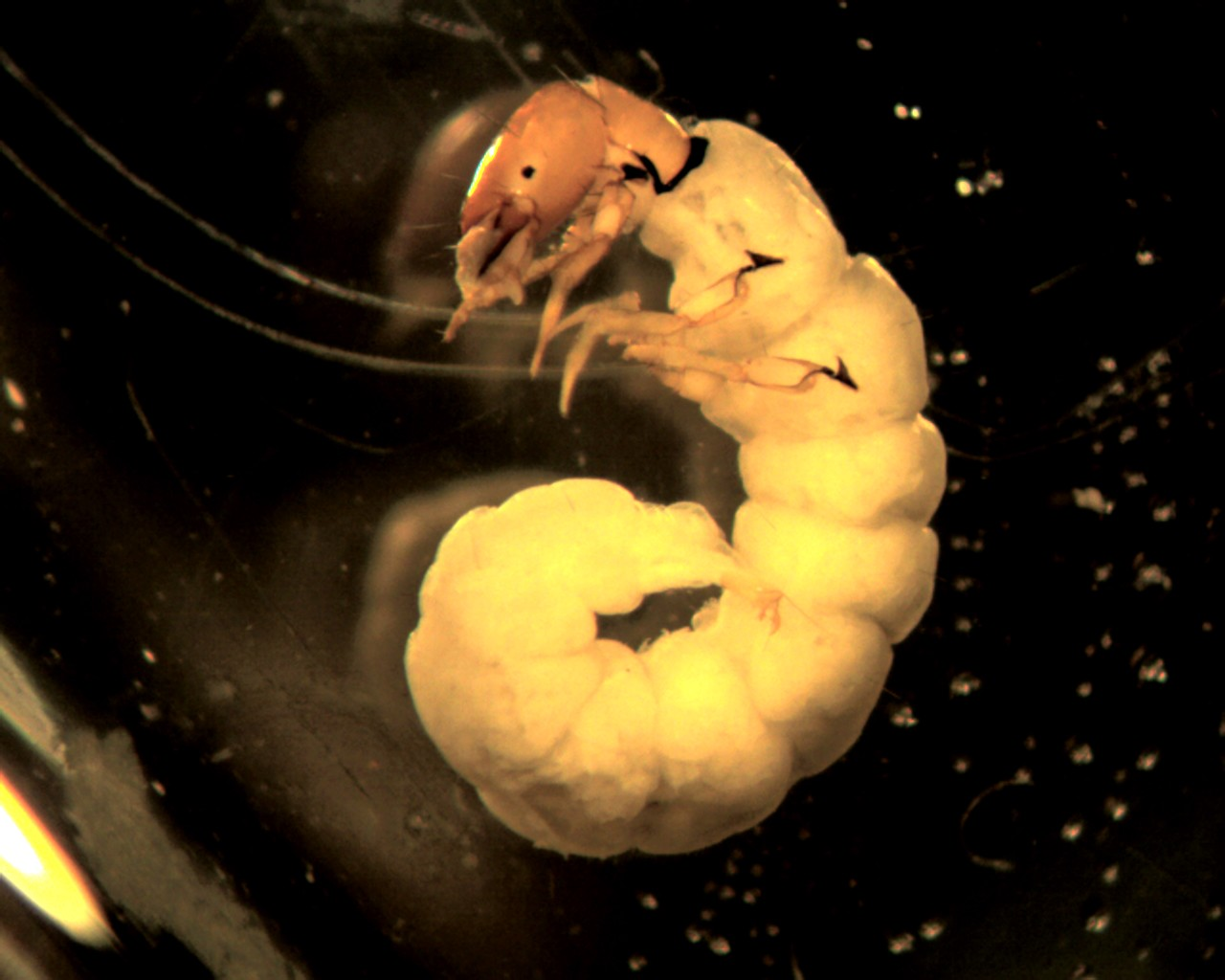
- Dolophilodes sp. larva

Scientific classification
- Kingdom: Animalia
- Phylum: Arthropoda
- Clade: Pancrustacea
- Class: Insecta
- Order: Trichoptera
- Suborder: Annulipalpia
- Superfamily: Philopotamoidea
- Family: Philopotamidae; Stephens, 1829

Subfamilies
- see text

= Philopotamidae =

Family of caddisflies

Philopotamidae is a family of insects in the order Trichoptera, the caddisflies. They are known commonly as the finger-net caddisflies.

The aquatic larvae of these caddisflies spin mesh nets of silk in flowing water to catch food. A larva can spin over a kilometer of extremely thin silk to create its intricate net.

Subfamilies and genera include:

- Subfamily Chimarrinae
  - Chimarra
  - Chimarrhodella
- Subfamily Paulianodinae
  - Paulianodes
- Subfamily Philopotaminae
  - Cabreraia
  - Cryptobiosella
  - Doloclanes
  - Dolomyia
  - Dolophilodes
  - Dolopsyche
  - Edidiehlia
  - Gunungiella
  - Hydrobiosella
  - Kisaura
  - Neobiosella
  - Philopotamus
  - Wormaldia
  - Xenobiosella

== See also ==
- Dolophilodes distinctus
