= George Salt =

George Salt FRS (12 December 1903, Loughborough, Leicestershire – 17 February 2003, Cambridge, UK) was an English entomologist and ecologist. He was elected a Fellow of the Royal Society in 1956.

== Biography ==
Born as the oldest brother of three siblings, George Salt in April 1911 moved with his family to Calgary in Alberta, Canada. When he was nine years old he began delivering newspapers after school, continued this employment through his high school years, and consistently contributed his earnings to the family income. He enjoyed outdoor activities with his two younger brothers and, when he was nine years old, began collecting the Lepidoptera of Alberta. He did his secondary school study at Calgary's Crescent Heights Collegiate Institute. George and his three siblings graduated from the University of Alberta. He paid his own university expenses by vacation work.

In autumn 1924 he matriculated as a graduate student at Harvard University, where he studied under the famous entomologist William Morton Wheeler. For his doctoral dissertation George Salt investigated the parasitism by wasps belonging to the genus Stylops, specifically the effects of such parasitism on the secondary sexual characteristics, viscera, and behaviour of bees in the genus Andrena. He had two interludes during his graduate study at Harvard. After completing his first term, he worked in Cuba at the Harvard Biological Station, where he did research on sugarcane borers and ant mimicry. Two years later he was employed as an entomologist by the United Fruit Company to investigate ways of controlling the banana pests Colaspis hypochlora (a leaf beetle) and Castniomera atymnius humboldti (a moth) in Colombia. A survey of the damage caused by C. hypochlora showed that poorly drained areas were centres of the beetle infestation; study of its larval stages showed that carabao grass (Paspalum conjugatum) is an important food source for C. hypochlora. Improved drainage and carefully planned weeding resulted in partial eradication of the grass and considerable reduction in the damage caused by the beetle.

He returned to England in 1928 when William R. Thompson, the director of the Imperial Institute of Entomology, offered him the senior post under the directorship to do research at the institute's laboratory at Farnham Royal, Buckinghamshire. The goal of the research was biocontrol of agricultural pests by using parasites of the pests. In order to control western Canadian infestations by wheat stem sawflies belonging to the species Cephus cinctus, George Salt identified and studied nine primary parasites of Cephus pygmaeus.

At King's College, Cambridge, George Salt was elected in 1933 to a Fellowship. In the zoology department of the University of Cambridge, he was University Lecturer from 1937 to 1965 and the Reader in Animal Ecology from 1965 to 1971, when he retired as Emeritus. In 1939 he married Joyce Laing. They had two sons, Michael (born 1943) and Peter (born 1947). During WW II George Salt did research on biocontrol of wire worms which threatened Britain's cereal crops. This research led to the development of the Salt-Hollick soil washing machine. He spent the academic year 1948–1949 on sabbatical in East Africa, where he used the Salt-Hollick machine to study soil ecology. As a skilled amateur Alpine mountaineer, he made an extensive collection of insects at high altitude and "did ecological work in six mountainous regions: Kilimanjaro, Mt Kenya, the Ruwenzori, the Aberdares, both North and South Usambaras, and Mt Lemagrut near the Ngorongoro crater." On Mount Kilimanjaro he discovered eight new genera and over 60 new species.

For the academic year 1958–1959 he was on sabbatical. During six months of his sabbatical, he did research in West Pakistan on biocontrol of cotton pests. There he focused especially on Rogas testaceus, a wasp species parasitizing the spotted bollworm.

In 1970 George Salt published a monograph Cellular Defence Reactions of Insects, which described experimental analyses of the mechanisms by which some insects disable their parasites. The monograph, written as part of a series intended for biologists who were not overly specialized, introduced George Salt's research to a wider audience.

In 1986 Roderick C. Fisher published a paper on George Salt's influence on the development of experimental insect parasitology.

In retirement, George Salt did much excellent work in calligraphy and water colour painting. He gave his papers to King's College, Cambridge in 1998 and 2001. He died at Cambridge in February 2003 aged 99.

== Selected publications ==
- Salt, George; Myers, John Golding (1926). I. Report on Sugar-cane Borers at Soledad, Cuba. Harvard University Press.
- Salt, George (1931). "Parasites of the Wheat-stem Sawfly, Cephus pygmaeus, Linnaeus, in England". Bulletin of Entomological Research. 22 (4): 479–545. doi:10.1017/S0007485300035355. ISSN 0007-4853.
- Salt, George (1934). "Experimental studies in insect parasitism. II.―Superparasitism". Proceedings of the Royal Society of London. Series B, Containing Papers of a Biological Character. 114 (790): 455–476. Bibcode:1934RSPSB.114..455S. doi:10.1098/rspb.1934.0019.
- Salt, George (1935). "Experimental studies in insect parasitism III—host selection". Proceedings of the Royal Society of London. Series B, Biological Sciences. 117 (805): 413–435. Bibcode:1935RSPSB.117..413S. doi:10.1098/rspb.1935.0037. S2CID 85170029.
- Salt, George (1937). "The sense used by Trichogramma to distinguish between parasitized and unparasitized hosts". Proceedings of the Royal Society of London. Series B, Biological Sciences. 122 (826): 57–75. Bibcode:1937RSPSB.122...57S. doi:10.1098/rspb.1937.0010.
- Salt, George (1938). "Experimental Studies in Insect Parasitism. VI.—Host Suitability". Bulletin of Entomological Research. 29 (3): 223–246. doi:10.1017/S0007485300035574.
- Salt, George (1940). "Experimental Studies in Insect Parasitism. VII. The Effects of different Hosts on the Parasite Trichogramma evanescent Westw.(Hym. Chalicidoidea.)". Proceedings of the Royal Entomological Society of London. 15 (10–12): 81–95. doi:10.1111/j.1365-3032.1940.tb00575.x.
- Salt, George; Hollick, F. S. J. (1944). "Studies of wireworm populations". Annals of Applied Biology. 31: 52–64. doi:10.1111/j.1744-7348.1944.tb06208.x.
- Salt, George (1963). "The defence reactions of insects to metazoan parasites". Parasitology. 53 (3–4): 527–642. doi:10.1017/S0031182000073960. PMID 14080003. 1963
- Salt, George (1968). "The Resistance of Insect Parasitoids to the Defence Reactions of Their Hosts". Biological Reviews. 43 (2): 200–232. doi:10.1111/j.1469-185X.1968.tb00959.x. PMID 4869949. S2CID 21251615. 1968
