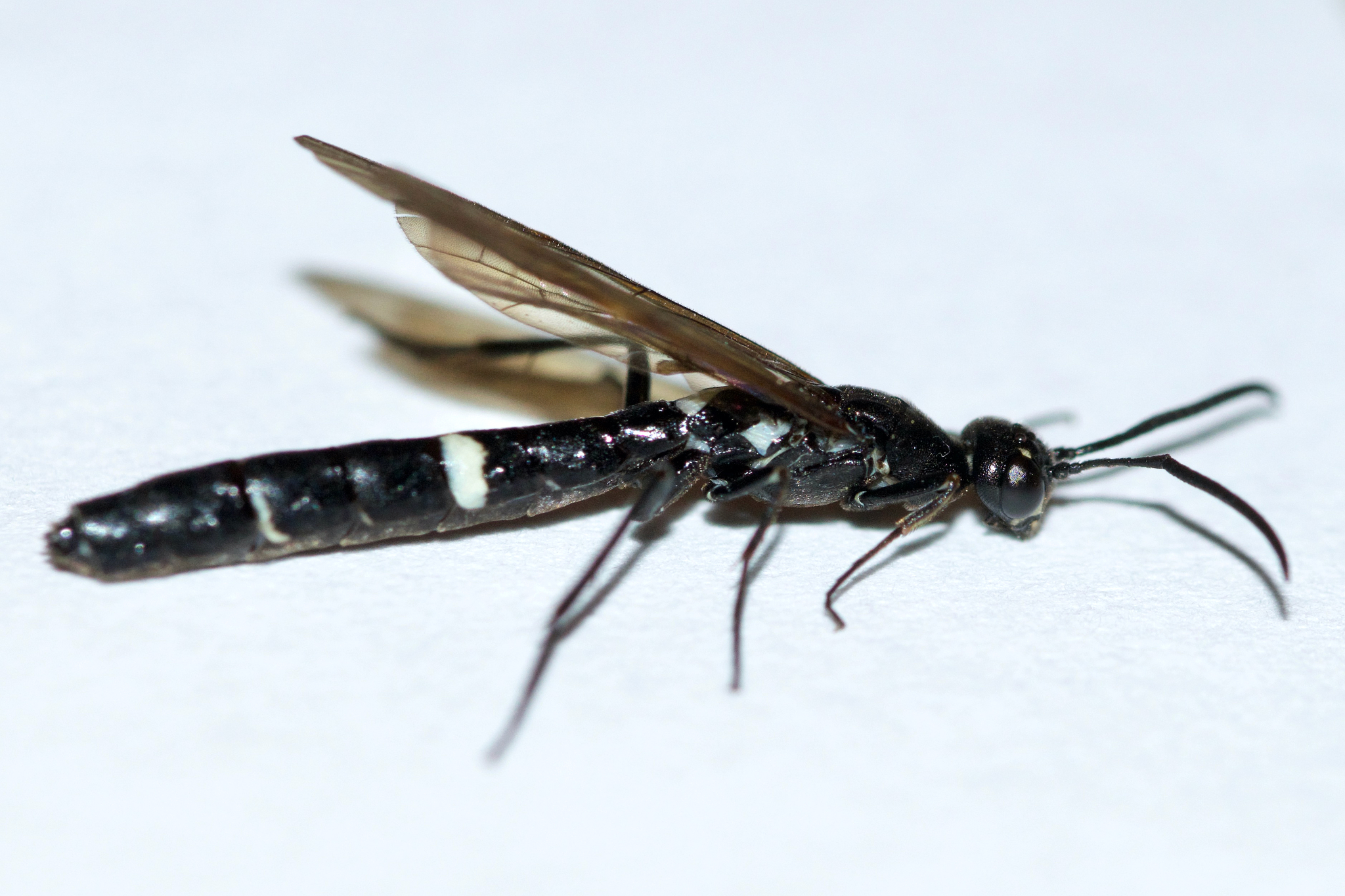

Scientific classification
- Domain: Eukaryota
- Kingdom: Animalia
- Phylum: Arthropoda
- Class: Insecta
- Order: Hymenoptera
- Family: Cephidae
- Genus: Phylloecus
- Species: P. trimaculatus

Binomial name
- Phylloecus trimaculatus Say, 1824

= Phylloecus trimaculatus =

Species of sawfly

Phylloecus trimaculatus, the rose shoot sawfly, is a species of stem sawfly in the family Cephidae occurring from southern Canada and the eastern U.S. to the Great Plains.

Adults emerge in late April and lay eggs inside the stems of Rosa and Rubus species. The larvae then feed throughout the summer. In the autumn the larvae drop to the ground to overwinter.
