= Janus integer =

Scientific classification
- Domain: Eukaryota
- Kingdom: Animalia
- Phylum: Arthropoda
- Class: Insecta
- Order: Hymenoptera
- Family: Cephidae
- Genus: Janus
- Species: J. integer

Binomial name
- Janus integer (Norton)

Species of sawfly

Janus integer, the currant stem girdler, is a species of stem sawfly in the family Cephidae native to North America.
