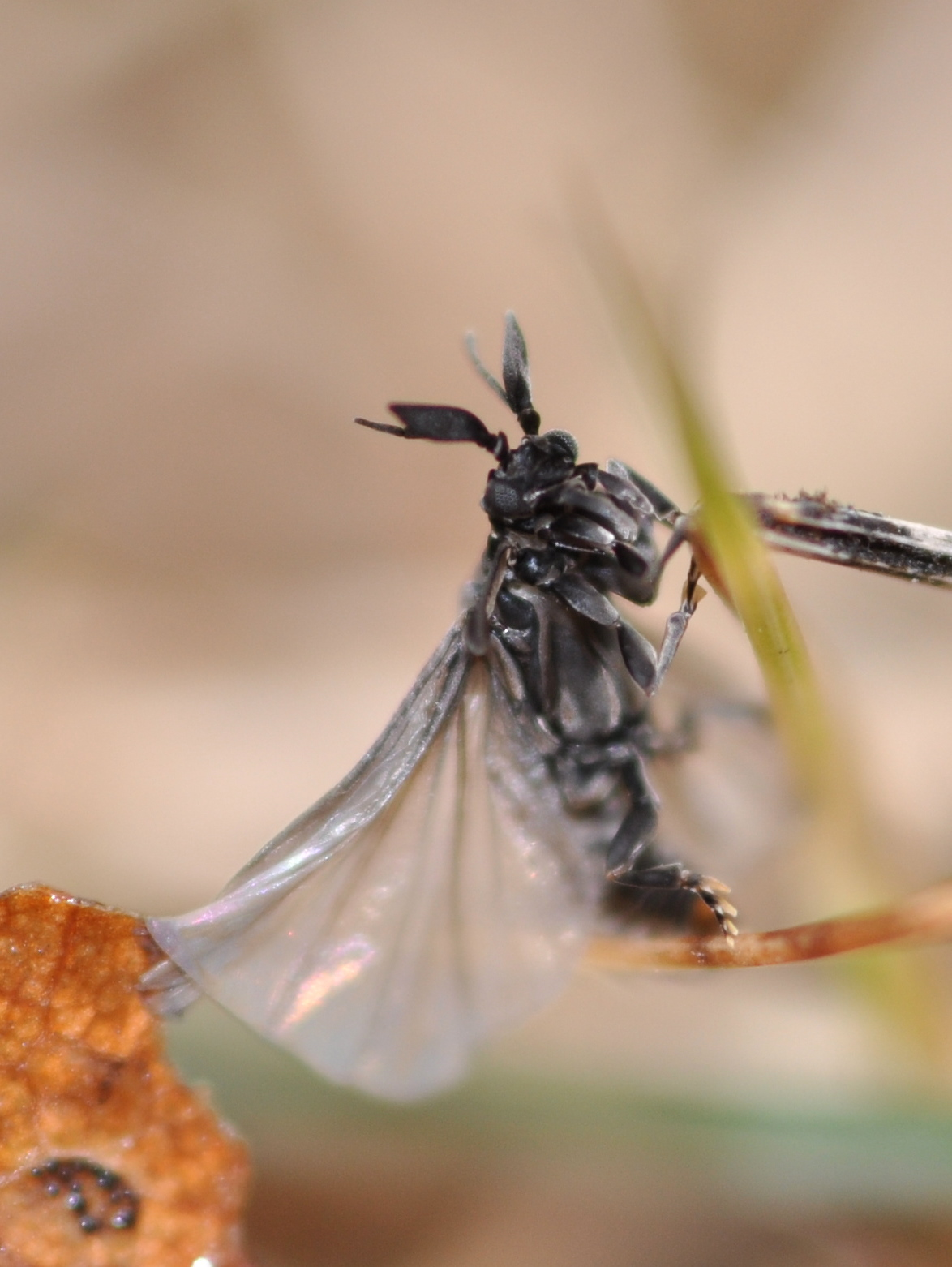
- Male
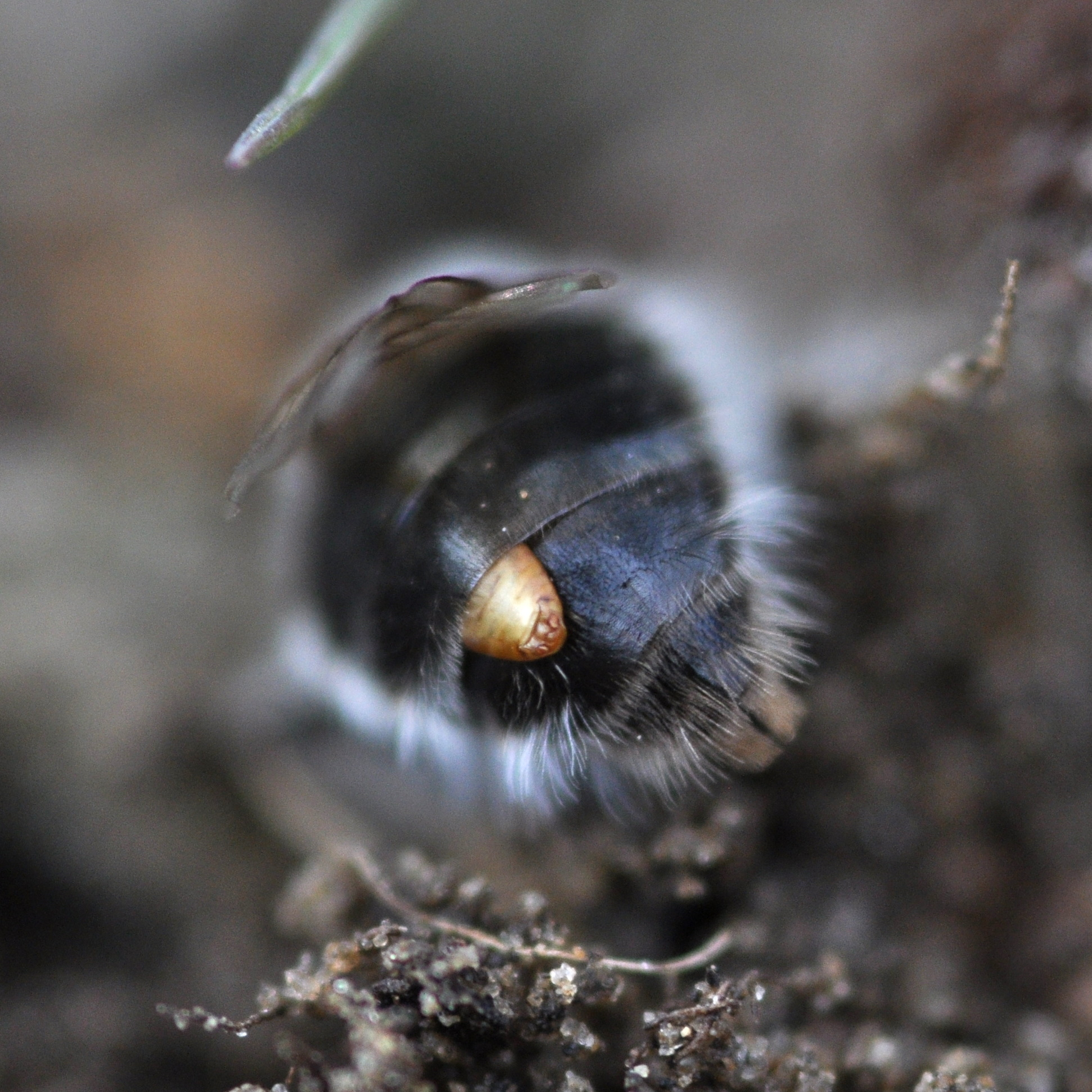
- Female Stylops sp. in hindparts of Andrena vaga

Scientific classification
- Kingdom: Animalia
- Phylum: Arthropoda
- Class: Insecta
- Order: Strepsiptera
- Family: Stylopidae
- Genus: Stylops
- Species: S. melittae

Binomial name
- Stylops melittae Kirby, 1802

Synonyms
- Stylops kirbii Leach, 1817; Stylops kirbyi Kinzelbach, 1978; Stylops spencei Kinzelbach, 1971; Stylops spencii Pickering, 1836

= Stylops melittae =

Species of insect

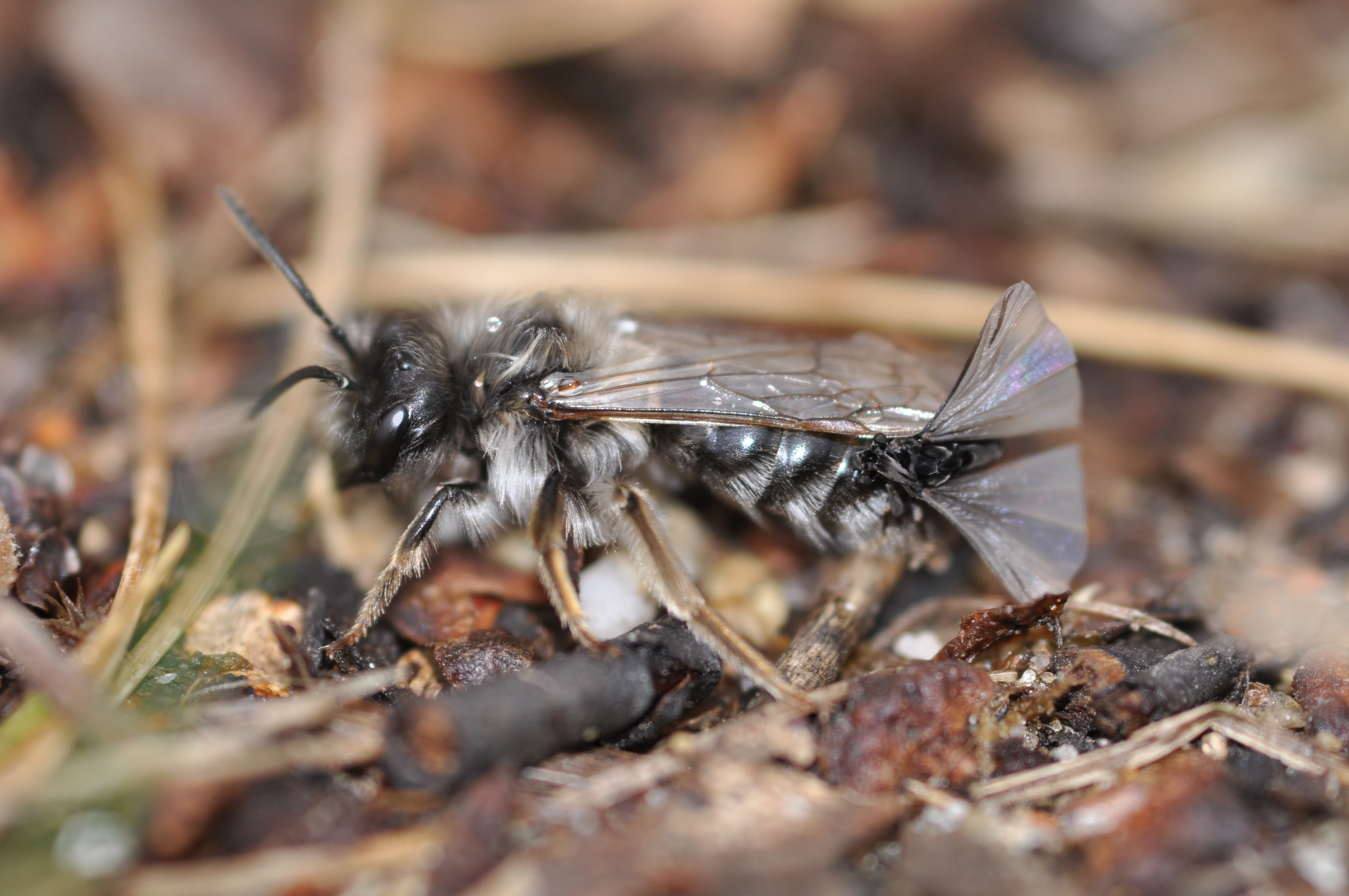
Andrena vaga male bee, with Stylops sp. mating on its abdomen

Stylops melittae is a species of the order Strepsiptera of flying insects, that parasitize various species of sand bees (Andrena).

== Biology ==
The female Stylops melittae gives birth to a large number of motile primary larvae, that are strewn upon blossoms. From there they can be delivered along with the pollen at the nest construction of the sand bees for which the species is specialized. In the nest construction the primary larvae penetrate into the host larvae and molt into exclusively endoparasitic secondary larvae. These roam about feeding in the host, and after a few further moltings establish themselves in the abdomen, and with their anterior portion break through between two abdominal segments of the host's skin, where they pupate. The exit point lays mostly between the 4th and 5th, more rarely between the 3rd and 4th, abdominal segment.

There are substantially more females (77–92%) than males (2–23%). The females remain all their lives in this puparium where they will be visited by the males for the purpose of copulation. Therefore, the females release a pheromone (3,5,9-trimethyldodecanal) produced by cephalothoracic gland and attract the males.

Stylops melittae can emerge in two generations, but most emerge in just one generation, so that stylops-infested sand bees are encountered mostly just in the early months of the year March through May.

== Influence on the host species ==
Stylops melittae primarily parasitizes species of sand bees that use the blossoms of multiple plants (that is, those that are polylectic); sand bee species specialized for blossoms of a single or few plant species, are more rarely affected. This distribution regarding host specificity would not be expected.

Stylops melittae has a markedly variable appearance. The proportions of the cephalothorax of the female have a great range of variability and consequently at times sequences of apparently host-specific species have been described, that have since been subsumed under single species.

Female sand bees become parasitized far more often than males.

Stylops-parasitized female sand bees are sterile and express themselves in behavior and appearance rather like their male counterparts of the species. The pollen gathering apparatus is reduced, the abdomen is flatter, and also the coloration is reminiscent of male individuals. Furthermore the stylops-parasitized female bees leave the maternal nest a few days earlier than do uninfested female individuals, similarly as do healthy male individuals. The earlier flight of the infested females gives the parasite more time for the development of the primary larvae. Stylops-parasitized females are no longer active after they have dug out their nest, while healthy females then fly out to provide for their offspring.

The less often infested male sand bees are by their appearance less affected, but are rather reminiscent of the female animals.

== In science and culture ==
William Kirby was responsible for classifying the Strepsiptera as a separate order of insects. On the foundation of the Entomological Society of London in 1833 William Kirby was made Honorary Life President and Stylops melittae (then known as Stylops kirbyi) was adopted as the society’s symbol. The seal was first used for a letter by the society to William Kirby, which was signed by the president and thirty members in 1836 to thank him for presenting the society with a cabinet containing his entire insect collection. The society's badge has remained almost unchanged since its first use.
