= Halictoxenos borealis =

Scientific classification
- Domain: Eukaryota
- Kingdom: Animalia
- Phylum: Arthropoda
- Class: Insecta
- Order: Strepsiptera
- Family: Stylopidae
- Genus: Halictoxenos
- Species: H. borealis

Binomial name
- Halictoxenos borealis Kifune, Hirashima & Maeta, 1982

Species of insect

Halictoxenos borealis is a species of the order Strepsiptera of flying insects, that parasitize sweat bees (Lasioglossum).

Nakase and Kato (2021) found that the parasitised bees (Lasioglossum apristum) changed their behaviour and visit flowers not to forage but to release the first-instar larvae of their parasite Halictoxenos borealis.

It seems that only female Halictoxenos borealis made their host bees visit flowers. Parasitised bees kept visiting nectarless flowers (Hydrangea serrata in this study), even though this behaviour might have had negative effect on them.

Bees that were parasitized by a female strepsipteran during the larval-releasing stage, may encourage the discharge of mobile first-instar larvae onto flowers. This behavior benefits the parasite. Only once the larvae have reached a specific stage of development may streptopteran parasites affect the behavior of their host. It is only adult females who parasite, no males nor immature females’ parasite the bees.
