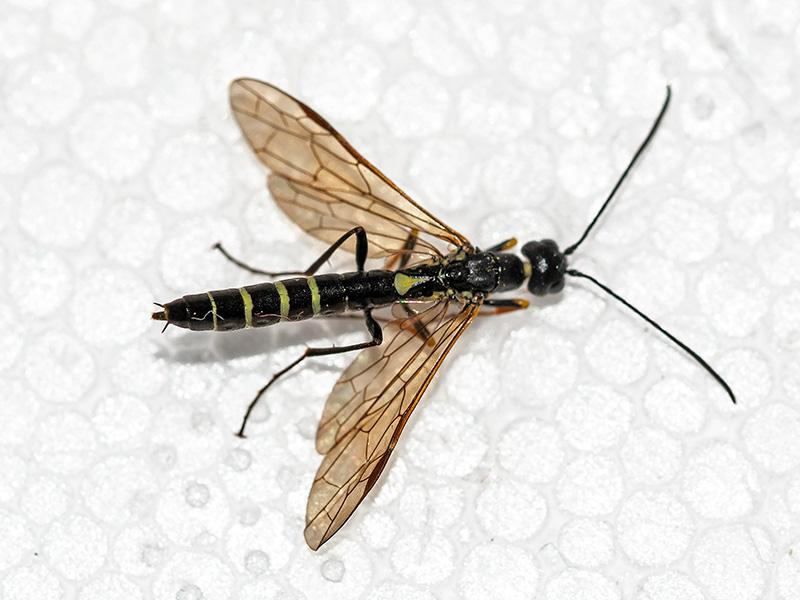

Scientific classification
- Kingdom: Animalia
- Phylum: Arthropoda
- Clade: Pancrustacea
- Class: Insecta
- Order: Hymenoptera
- Family: Cephidae
- Genus: Calameuta
- Species: C. filiformis

Binomial name
- Calameuta filiformis (Eversmann, 1847)

Synonyms
- List: Cephus filiformis Eversmann, 1847; Astatus analis Klug, 1803; Cephus analis (Klug, 1803); Calameuta amurensis Gussakovskij, 1935; Calameuta arundinis (Giraud, 1863); Cephus arundinis Giraud, 1863; Calameuta rugosa Dovnar-Zapolskij, 1931; Cephus arundinis Giraud, 1963; Cephus elongatus Snellen Van Vollenhoven, 1858; Cephus elongatus Vollenhoven, 1858; Cephus infernalis Dovnar-Zapolskij, 1926; Cephus marginatus Kawall, 1864; Cephus quadricinctus Dahlbom, 1835

= Calameuta filiformis =

Species of sawfly

Calameuta filiformis, the dark-legged stem-sawfly, is a species of sawfly. It is one of two Calameuta species found in Britain and Ireland. The dark-legged stem-sawfly is 9–12 mm (0.35–0.47 in) long. The hind tibia is completely black, distinguishing it from C. pallipes, which has yellow hind tibia. C. filliformis is found in Wales, England, and Scotland. It is typically seen near marshes, fens, and wet woodland.
