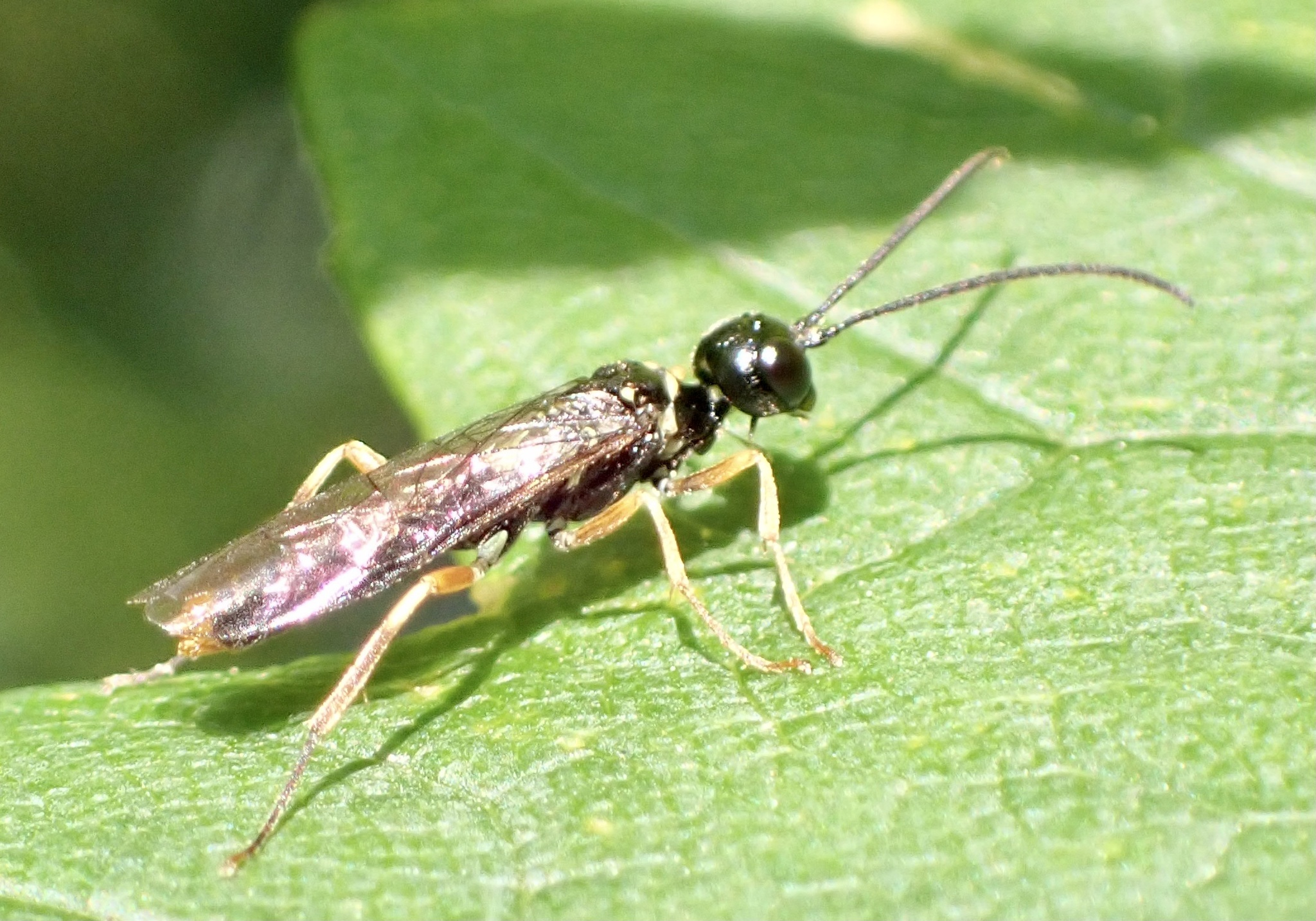
- Janus luteipes

Scientific classification
- Kingdom: Animalia
- Phylum: Arthropoda
- Class: Insecta
- Order: Hymenoptera
- Family: Cephidae
- Subfamily: Cephinae
- Tribe: Hartigiini
- Genus: Janus; Stephens, 1829

= Janus (sawfly) =

Genus of sawflies

Janus is a genus of stem sawflies in the family Cephidae. There are about five described species in Janus.

== Species ==
These five species belong to the genus Janus:

- Janus abbreviatus (Say)^{i c g}
- Janus compressus (Fabricius, 1793)^{g}
- Janus cynosbati (Linnaeus, 1758)^{g}
- Janus integer (Norton)^{i c g b} (currant stem girdler)
- Janus luteipes (Lepeletier, 1823)^{g}

Data sources: i = ITIS, c = Catalogue of Life, g = GBIF, b = Bugguide.net
