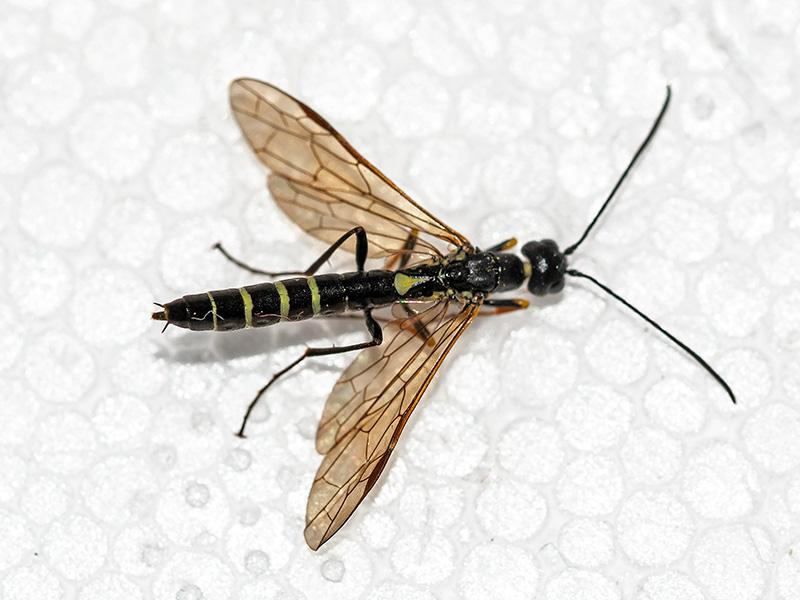
- Calameuta filiformis

Scientific classification
- Kingdom: Animalia
- Phylum: Arthropoda
- Clade: Pancrustacea
- Class: Insecta
- Order: Hymenoptera
- Family: Cephidae
- Genus: Calameuta; Konow, 1896

= Calameuta =

Genus of sawflies

Calameuta is a genus of insects belonging to the family Cephidae.

The genus was first described by Friedrich Wilhelm Konow in 1896.

The species of this genus are found in Europe and North America.

Species:

- Calameuta antigae (Konow, 1894)
- Calameuta aurea (Benson, 1935)
- Calameuta clavata
- Calameuta festiva Benson, 1954
- Calameuta filiformis (Eversmann, 1847)
- Calameuta filum (Gussakovskij, 1935)
- Calameuta grombczewskii (Jakowlew, 1891)
- Calameuta haemorrhoidalis (Fabricius, 1781)
- Calameuta idolon (Rossi, 1794)
- Calameuta middlekauffi
- Calameuta moreana (Pic, 1916)
- Calameuta pallipes (Klug, 1803)
- Calameuta punctata (Klug, 1803)
- Calameuta tazzekae Lacourt, 1991
