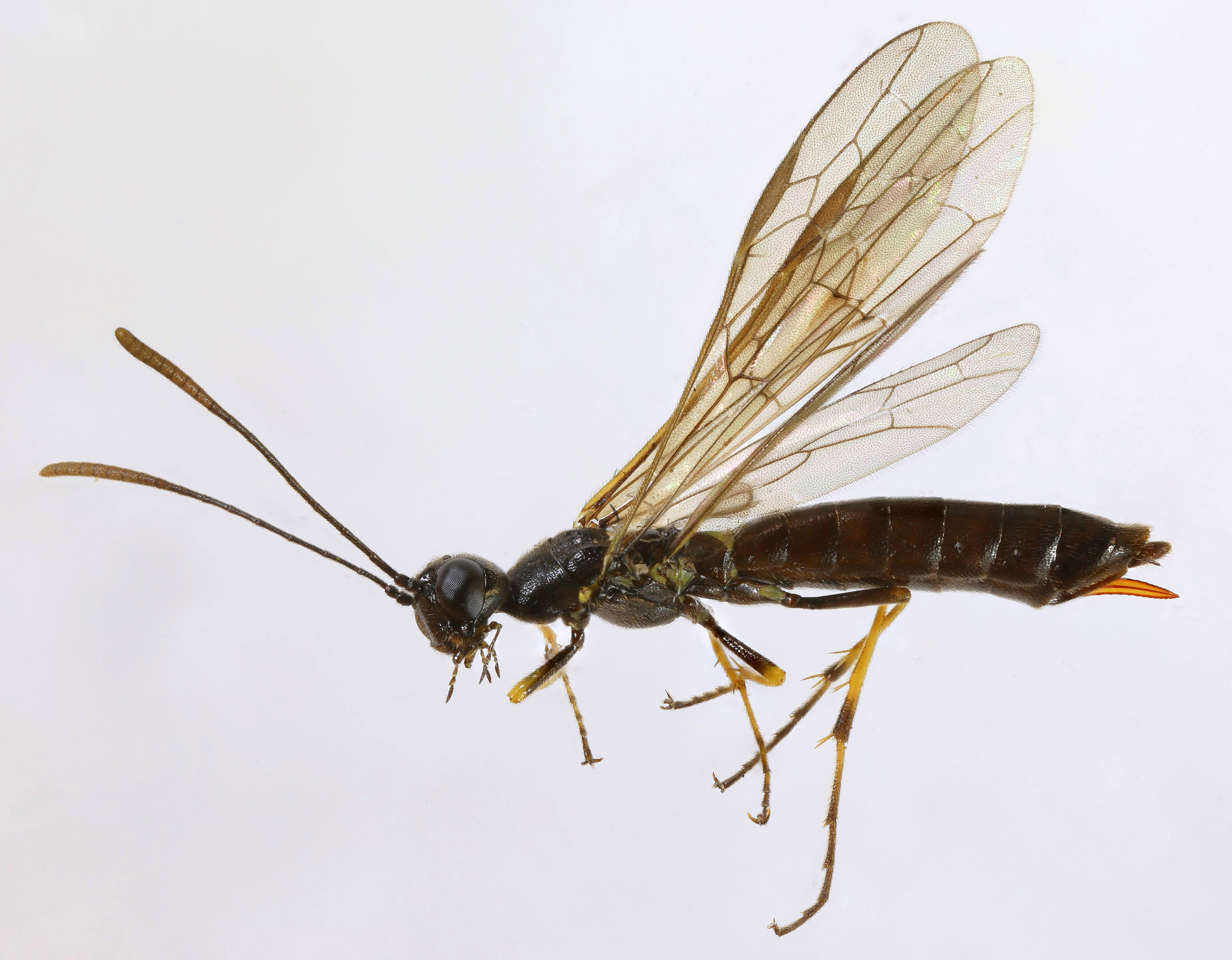
- Calameuta pallipes, Marford Quarry, North Wales

Scientific classification
- Domain: Eukaryota
- Kingdom: Animalia
- Phylum: Arthropoda
- Class: Insecta
- Order: Hymenoptera
- Family: Cephidae
- Genus: Calameuta
- Species: C. pallipes

Binomial name
- Calameuta pallipes (Klug, 1803)

= Calameuta pallipes =

Species of sawfly

Calameuta pallipes is a Palearctic species of sawfly.
