= Trachelus =

Scientific classification
- Domain: Eukaryota
- Kingdom: Animalia
- Phylum: Arthropoda
- Class: Insecta
- Order: Hymenoptera
- Family: Cephidae
- Genus: Trachelus; Jurine, 1807

Genus of sawflies

Trachelus is a genus of sawflies belonging to the family Cephidae.

Species:

- Trachelus flavicornis
- Trachelus libanensis
- Trachelus tabidus
