= Joyce Laing =

British entomologist

Joyce Laing (later Joyce Salt 1910 – 25 May 2002) was a British entomologist and one of the first women to win a Stoney Scholarship from the British Federation of University Women.

== Early life ==
Laing was born in Stockton, Durham, England in 1910. After completing high school, Laing won an essay prize and travelled to Canada in 1930, visiting the then Duke of Windsor's (Edward VIII) ranch in Alberta.

Laing enrolled in Newnham College, at the University of Cambridge in 1930, taking her B.A. and M.A. She was a Fellow of Newnham College from 1933 to 1937 and a Balfour Student. Women who were at Newnham College with her included Edith Whetham, Elizabeth Caldwell, Dorothy Hill and Jean Mitchell.

Laing earned her PhD from Cambridge in 1937 with a thesis on Host-finding by insect parasites, and won a Stoney Scholarship of the British Federation of University Women, to study in Australia or New Zealand. Laing undertook her postdoctoral research at the University of Queensland in Australia, studying the biology of parasites and fruit flies for almost a year. Laing had studied at Newnham College alongside Australian geologist Dorothy Hill, and both women took their PhD at Cambridge. Laing would continue her professional relationship with Hill, in the UQ Science Students Association, which took students on fieldwork trips, most notably around Moreton Bay.

Laing returned to England in 1938, and married one of her former Cambridge advisors, entomologist and academic, George Salt (1903–2003) in 1939. They had two sons, Michael and Peter. Joyce Salt was active in the Newnham College alumni community.

Joyce and George remained at Cambridge for the rest of their lives, except for brief periods in Africa and Pakistan. Laing died on 25 May 2002. She was survived by her husband and sons.

== Published works ==
Salt, G. and Laing, J. (1935). Discriminative Ability of a Parasitoid. Nature, 135 (3419): 792. doi:10.1038/135792b0

Laing, J. (1935). On the Ptilinum of the Blow-fly (Calliphora erythrocephala). Journal of cell science, s2-77 (308): 497–521. doi:10.1242/jcs.s2-77.308.497

Laing, J. (1937). Host-Finding by Insect Parasites – Observations on the Finding of Hosts by Alysia manducator, Mormoniella vitripennis and Trichogramma evanescens. Journal of animal ecology, 6(2): 298–317. doi:10.2307/1186 (over 290 citations)
