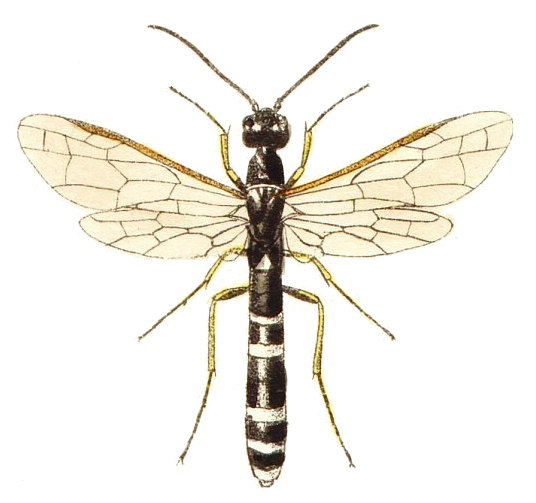
- Phylloecus linearis

Scientific classification
- Domain: Eukaryota
- Kingdom: Animalia
- Phylum: Arthropoda
- Class: Insecta
- Order: Hymenoptera
- Family: Cephidae
- Subfamily: Cephinae
- Tribe: Hartigiini
- Genus: Phylloecus; Newman, 1838

Species
- see text

Synonyms
- Hartigia Schiødte, 1839

= Phylloecus =

Genus of sawflies

Phylloecus (formerly Hartigia) is a genus of sawflies belonging to the family Cephidae.

The genus was first described by Edward Newman in 1838. In 2014, the genus Hartigia Schiødte, 1839 was reclassified as a junior synonym of Phylloecus.

== Species ==
The following species are included in the genus:

- Phylloecus agilis (F. Smith, 1874)
- Phylloecus albotegularis (Wei & Nie, 1996)
- Phylloecus algiricus André, 1881
- Phylloecus bicinctus Provancher, 1875
- Phylloecus cheni (Wei & Nie, 1999)
- Phylloecus coreanus (Takeuchi, 1938)
- Phylloecus cowichanus (Ries, 1937)
- Phylloecus elevatus (Maa, 1944)
- Phylloecus epigonus (Zhelochovtsev, 1961)
- Phylloecus etorofensis (Takeuchi, 1955)
- Phylloecus fasciatus (Cresson, 1880)
- Phylloecus faunus Newman, 1838
- Phylloecus kamijoi (Shinohara, 1999)
- Phylloecus linearis (Schrank, 1781)
- Phylloecus mexicanus (Guerin, [1844])
- Phylloecus minutus (Wei & Nie, 1997)
- Phylloecus niger (M. Harris, [1779])
- Phylloecus nigratus (Dovnar-Zapolskij, 1931)
- Phylloecus nigritus (Forsius, 1918)
- Phylloecus nigrotibialis (Wei & Nie, 1977)
- Phylloecus pyrrha (Zhelochovtsev, 1968)
- Phylloecus riesi (D. R. Smith, 1986)
- Phylloecus sibiricola Jakovlev, 1891
- Phylloecus simulator (Kokujev, 1910)
- Phylloecus stackelbergi (Gussakovskij, 1945)
- Phylloecus stigmaticalis (Wei & Nie, 1996)
- Phylloecus trimaculatus (Say, 1824)
- Phylloecus viator (F. Smith, 1874)
- Phylloecus xanthostoma (Eversmann, 1847)
- Phylloecus zhengi (Wei & Nie, 1996)
