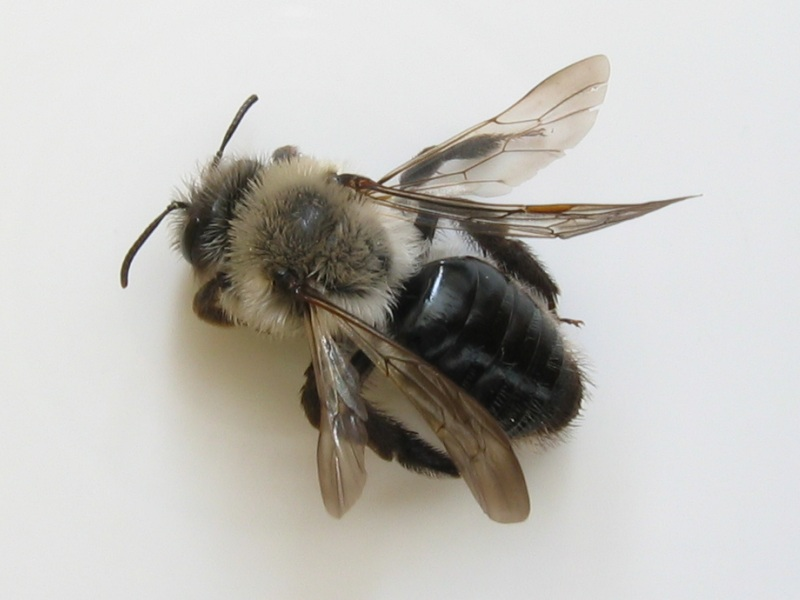

Scientific classification
- Domain: Eukaryota
- Kingdom: Animalia
- Phylum: Arthropoda
- Class: Insecta
- Order: Hymenoptera
- Family: Andrenidae
- Genus: Andrena
- Species: A. vaga

Binomial name
- Andrena vaga Panzer, 1799

Synonyms
- Andrena pratensis Müller 1776; Andrena ovina Klug 1810; Andrena nitidiventris Blanchard 1850; Andrena atricula Bischoff, 1922

= Andrena vaga =

Species of insect

Andrena vaga, the grey-backed mining bee, is a species of solitary bee which is found in most of Europe but which is very rare in Great Britain, where it may be recolonizing in the south-east after previously being extirpated. It specialises in feeding on the pollen of willows.

== Description ==
A. vaga is a large mining bee, 13-15mm in length, which has the entire thorax clothed in grey hairs, sometimes showing a slight buff tinge, the scopae and hind femorae have white hairs. It also has patches of white hairs on the abdomen sides. On closer examination the surface of the cuticle can be seen to be shiny metallic black. The face is covered with brownish hairs It resembles the ashy mining bee (Andrena cineraria). Males have the entire upper surface of the thorax covered in grey hair and pale hair on the hind tibia. When it can be seen, sternite 8 will show a downwards curve at its tip. The males have the sides and top of the face coloured white, with the bottom having long white hairs, it has long mandibles and rounded cheeks.

== Distribution ==
A. vaga is found in Europe as far north as 66°N, although it is found only in southern Scandinavia, east to Iran, Kyrgyzstan and Kazakhstan. In Great Britain, A. vaga was only known from only four records prior to 2009, almost all from south-east England, with the latest being in 1946, then in the 21st century it was recorded again in south-eastern England, in Kent and Hampshire, where they were recorded as breeding, and the species was recorded as moving to inland sites from the coast, suggesting that it was spreading.

== Habitat ==
A. vaga occurs in pastures and meadows, often near water, as well as heathland and woody gladesand coastal areas with loose soil, always in the vicinity of various species of willows (Salix).

== Biology ==
A. vaga is univoltine, the adults are on the wing in early Spring, during March and April, sometimes as early as late February in more southerly warmer regions. They are oligolectic and feed on and collect the pollen from willow trees of the genus Salix. Where it is common A. vaga often forms large nest aggregations which may have as many as 10,000 nests. The nests are excavated in rather hard ground, often where there is sparse vegetation and where the substrate has either and even or sloping surface; the female excavated a vertical nest burrow. These are often located in sites which are subject to flooding and floods can have a significant impact on the populations of this species.

In mainland Europe the cuckoo-bee Nomada lathburiana is a cleptoparasite of A. vaga. Sphecodes gibbus has been suggested as another cleptoparasite of this species but that is regarded as unlikely. The strepsipteran Stylops melittae has been recorded as a parasitoid of A. vaga.

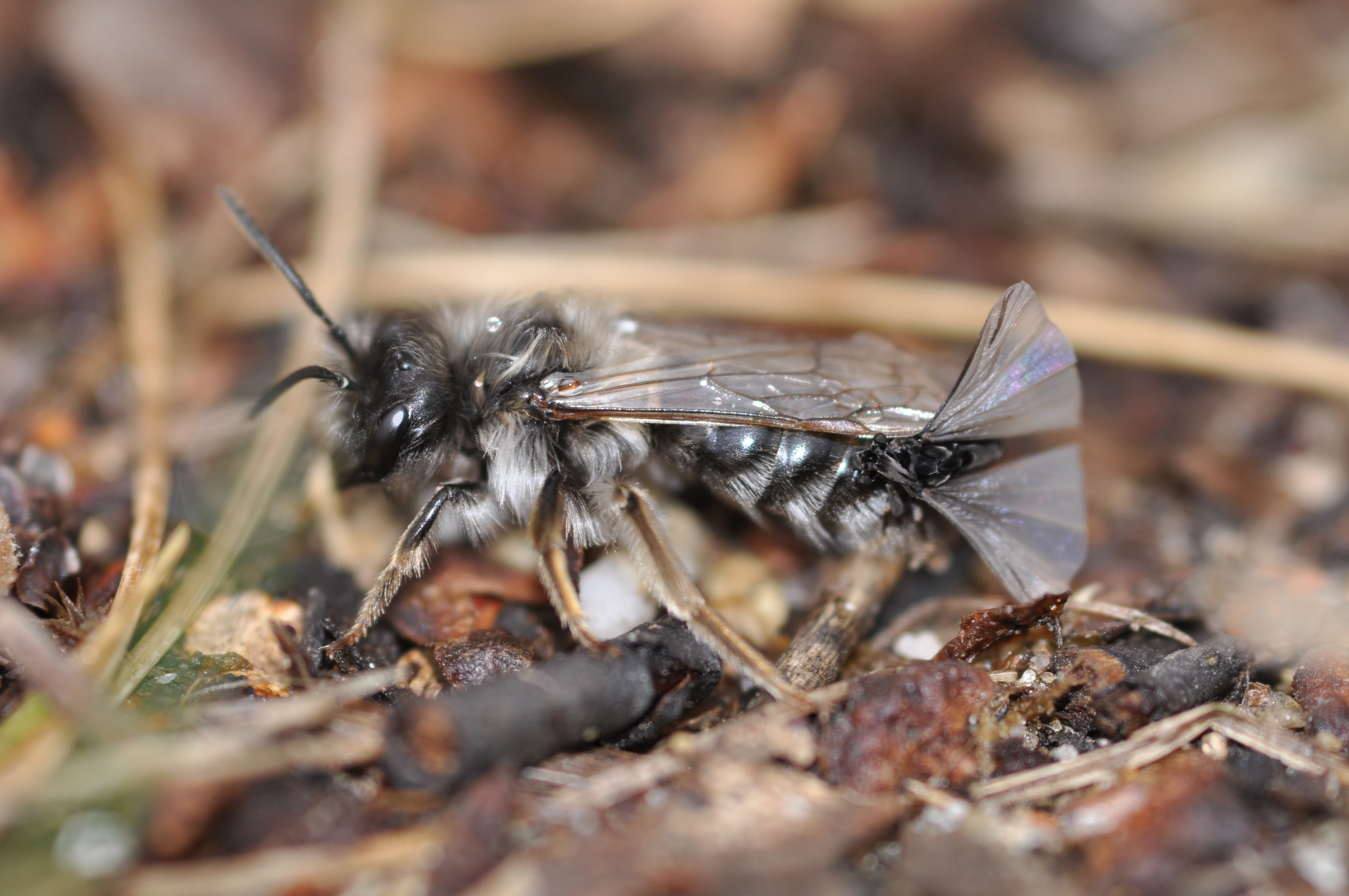
Andrena vaga with a male Stylops melittae on its abdomen
