= Halictoxenos =

Scientific classification
- Domain: Eukaryota
- Kingdom: Animalia
- Phylum: Arthropoda
- Class: Insecta
- Order: Strepsiptera
- Family: Stylopidae
- Subfamily: Stylopinae
- Genus: Halictoxenos; Pierce, 1908

Genus of insects

Halictoxenos is a genus of insects belonging to the family Stylopidae.

The genus was first described by W. Dwight Pierce in 1908.

The species of this genus are found in Eurasia and North America.

Species:

- Halictoxenos borealis
- Halictoxenos spencei
- Halictoxenos tumulorum
