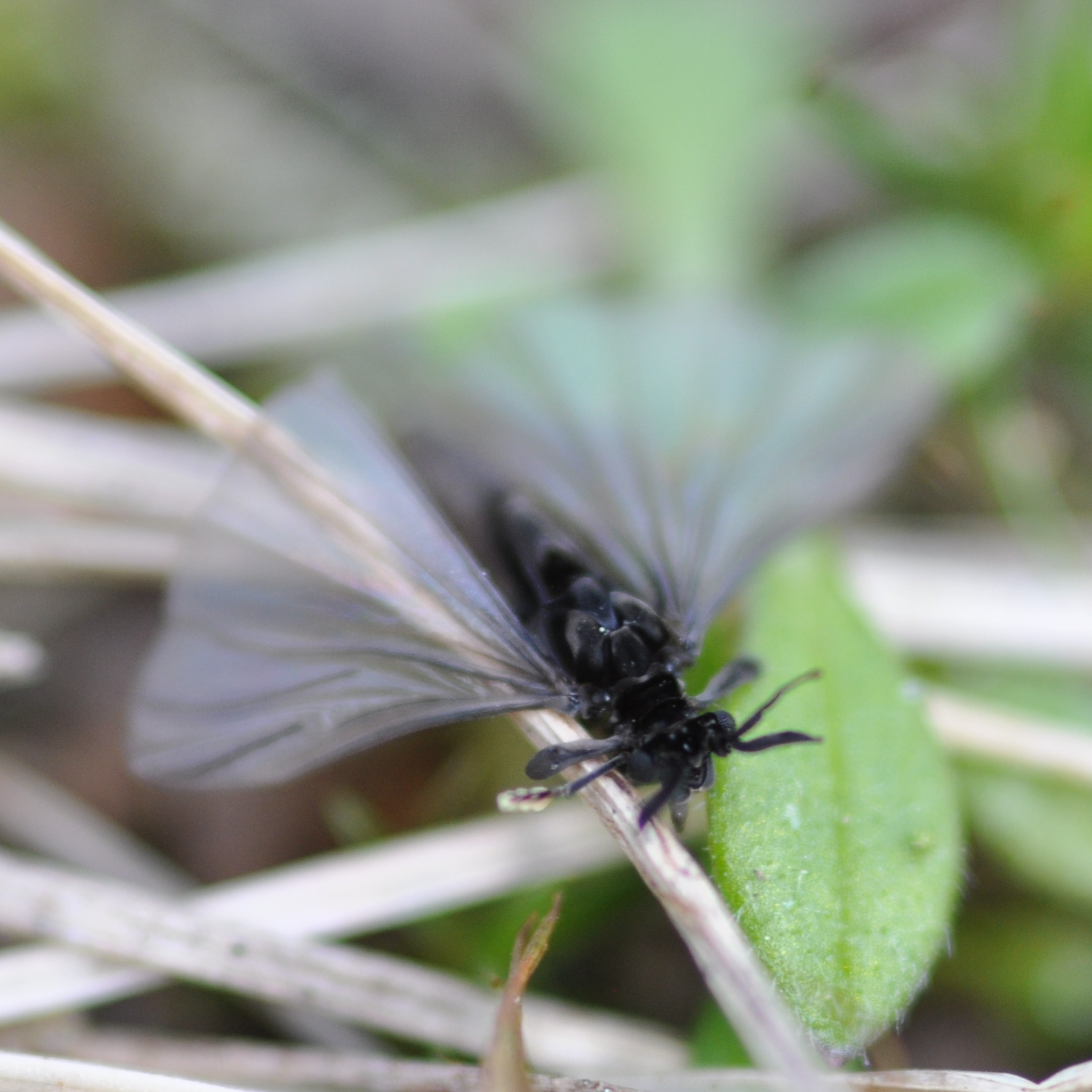
- Stylops melittae male; note the halteres in front of the wings
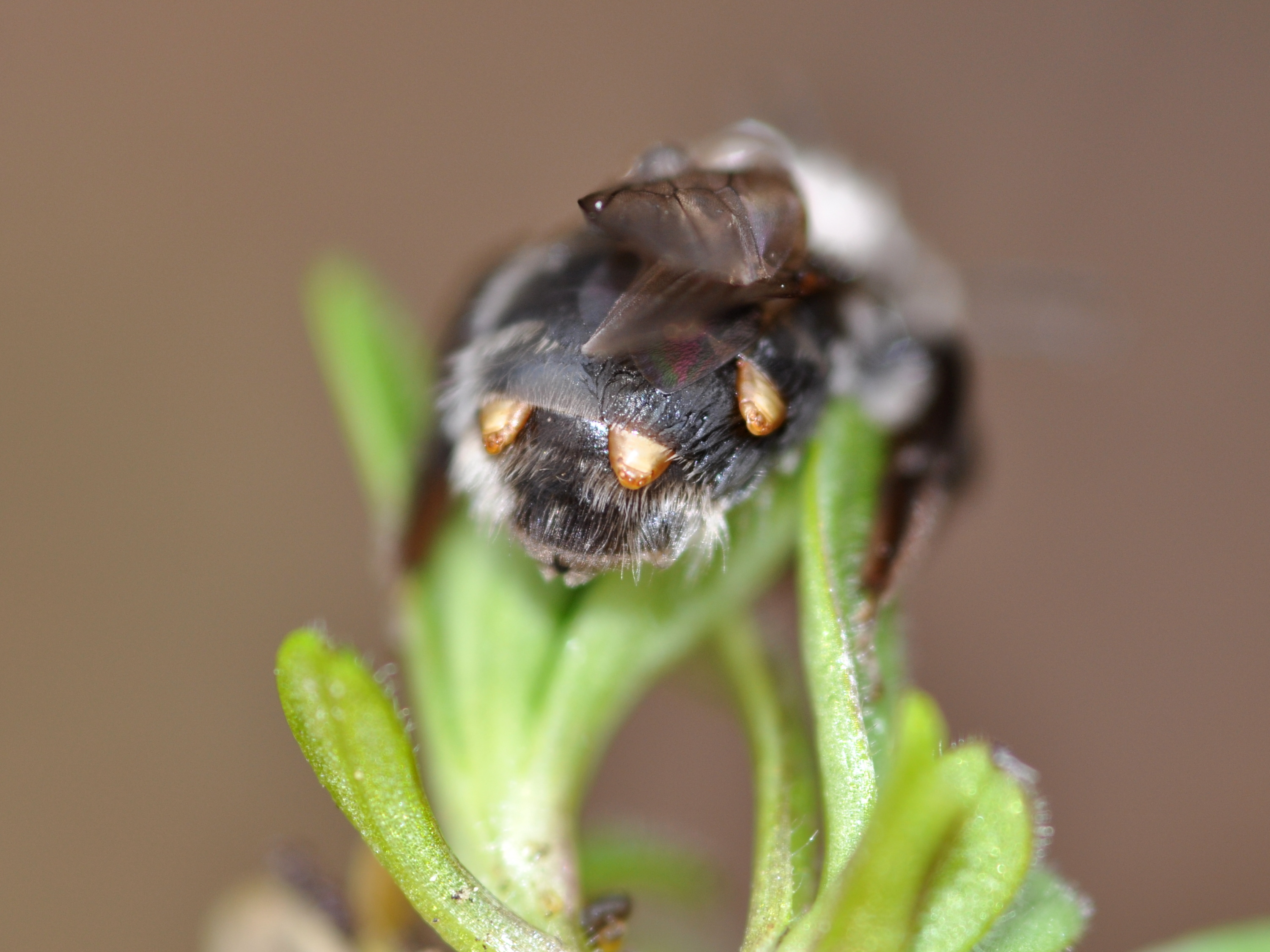
- Stylops melittae females protruding from the abdomen of an Andrenid bee

Scientific classification
- Kingdom: Animalia
- Phylum: Arthropoda
- Clade: Pancrustacea
- Class: Insecta
- Order: Strepsiptera
- Family: Stylopidae
- Genus: Stylops; Kirby, 1802

= Stylops =

Genus of insects

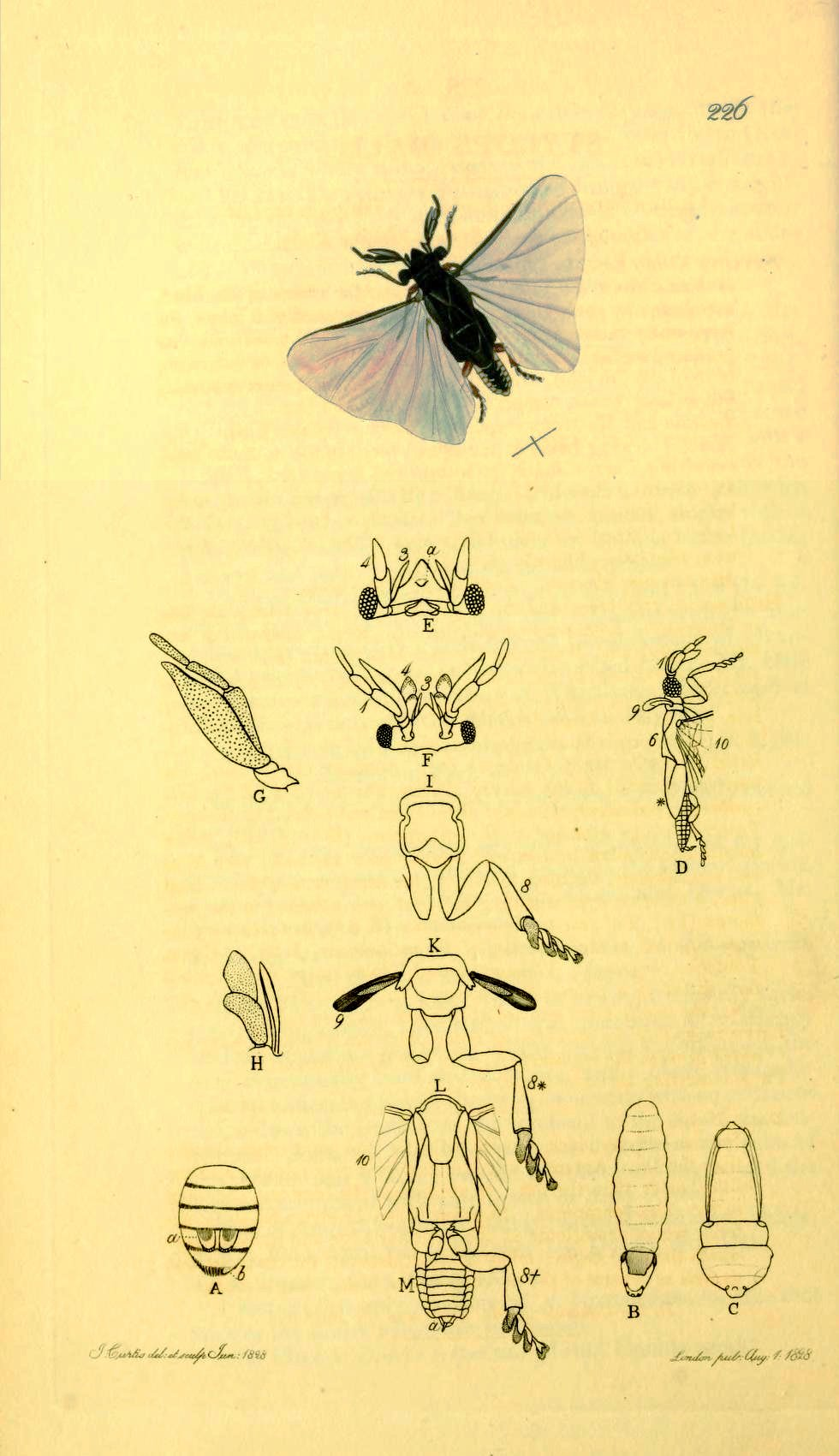
Stylops species: Adult male at top. Female and pupa at bottom right, B & C

Stylops is a genus of obligately endoparasitic insects in the family Stylopidae. Hosts are typically members of the order Hymenoptera.

The name "stylops", used without a capital "s", refers as a common name to any member of the order Strepsiptera, and not only the genus Stylops.

== Description ==
Males are 2–3 mm long and black with white wings. Females have no limbs and are only seen from their head and thorax poking out of the host bee. Larvae are triungulin. Stylops males are special since their front wings have been modified into halteres, unlike in dipterans, where their back wings are halteres.

== Life cycle ==
Stylops larvae emerge from their host bee while the host gathers pollen from flowers. The larvae then attach to other bees in order to be carried back to the nest. At the nest, the Stylops larvae enter the bodies of bee larvae and develop along with their host. Adult males leave their hosts to mate with females, who remain inside their host and hatch their eggs there.

== Species ==
Many including:

- Stylops analis Perkins, 1918
- Stylops andrenaphilus Luna de Carvalho, 1974
- Stylops ater Reichert, 1914
- Stylops aterrimus Newport, 1851
- Stylops borcherti Luna de Carvalho, 1974
- Stylops dalii Curtis, 1828
- Stylops deserticola Medvedev, 1970
- Stylops dinizi Luna de Carvalho, 1974
- Stylops friesei Kirby, 1802
- Stylops gwynanae Günther, 1957
- Stylops hammella Perkins, 1918
- Stylops ibericus Luna de Carvalho, 1969
- Stylops kinzelbachi Luna de Carvalho, 1974
- Stylops liliputanus Luna de Carvalho, 1974
- Stylops lusohispanicus Luna de Carvalho, 1974
- Stylops madrilensis Luna de Carvalho, 1974
- Stylops maxillaris Pasteels, 1949
- Stylops melittae Kirby, 1802
- Stylops moniliaphagus Luna de Carvalho, 1974
- Stylops nevinsoni Perkins, 1918
- Stylops obenbergeri Ogloblin, 1923
- Stylops obsoletus Luna de Carvalho, 1974
- Stylops pacificus Bohart, 1936
- Stylops paracuellus Luna de Carvalho, 1974
- Stylops pasteelsi Luna de Carvalho, 1974
- Stylops praecocis Luna de Carvalho, 1974
- Stylops risleri Kinzelbach, 1967
- Stylops ruthenicus Schkaff, 1925
- Stylops salamancanus Luna de Carvalho, 1974
- Stylops spreta Perkins, 1918
- Stylops thwaitesi Perkins, 1918
- Stylops ventricosae Pierce, 1909
- Stylops warnckei Luna de Carvalho, 1974

== In popular culture ==
The official seal, and later logo, of the Royal Entomological Society features a male Stylops.
