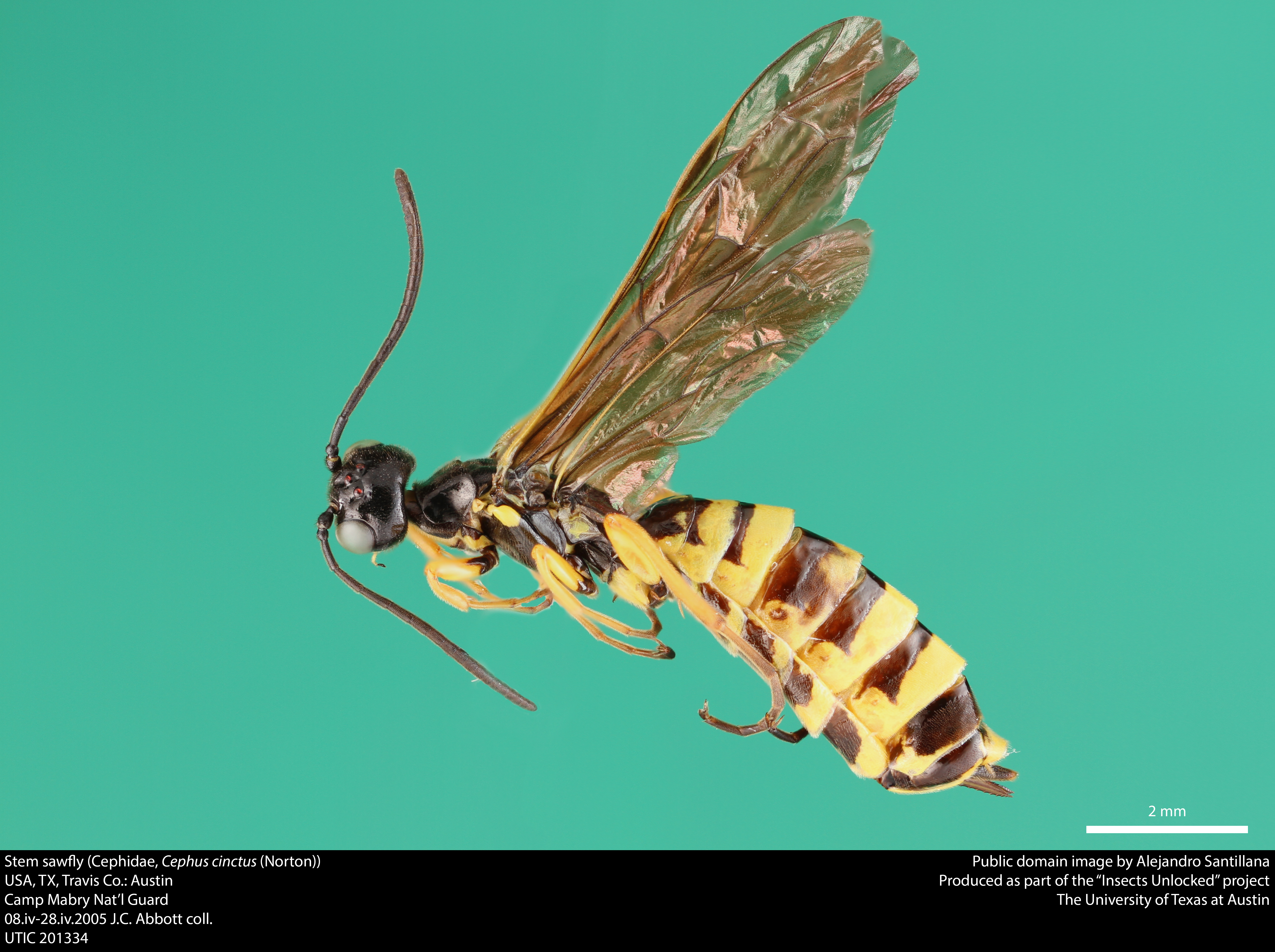

Scientific classification
- Kingdom: Animalia
- Phylum: Arthropoda
- Clade: Pancrustacea
- Class: Insecta
- Order: Hymenoptera
- Family: Cephidae
- Genus: Cephus
- Species: C. cinctus

Binomial name
- Cephus cinctus Norton, 1872

= Cephus cinctus =

Species of sawfly

Cephus cinctus, also known as wheat stem sawfly, is a slow flying, yellow and black coloured, destructive pest found mainly in western North America.

== Habit and habitat ==
Wheat stem sawflies grow to a length of 7 to 12 mm, with males being smaller than females. The body is black with yellow bands on the abdomen, the wings are smoke-coloured and the legs are yellow.

== Life cycle ==
After mating, female wasps lay eggs in plant stems, usually before the grass head has emerged. Unfertilised eggs hatch into male larvae while fertilised eggs hatch into females. Larvae feed on the parenchyma of the stem. When a larva matures, it moves to the bottom of the stem and cuts a notch or groove around the inner circumference of the stem. In autumn, the larva plugs the exposed end of the stem and builds a cocoon in which it overwinters. In the following spring, it moves to the pupal stage. Adults emerge from stems to mate and begin the cycle again.

== Pest status ==
The species has a wide host range that includes all large-stemmed grasses except oats (Avena sativa). Specifically, it feeds on wheat (Triticum aestivum), durum (T. durum), barley (Hordeum vulgare), rye (Secale cereale), wheatgrass (Agropyron spp.), timothy (Phleum spp.), Elymus spp. and cheatgrass (Bromus tectorum).

Cephus cinctus reduces yields by reducing head weight, grain quality and protein content, shrivelling seeds, and causing lodging of stems (which reduces harvest efficiency).

Because most of the life cycle occurs inside plants, insecticides are ineffective against this species.

== Distribution ==
It is known as a chronic pest in Northern Great Plains of the United States and also an important pest of wheat in the Canadian Prairies. The species is distributed widely in various regions of the US and Canada. However, the species is believed to originate from northeastern Asia.

== Genome ==
The genome of this species has been studied. 86% of its proteins have identifiable orthologs in other insects. It has several gene lineages not present in the more advanced Apocrita (wasps, bees and ants), such as genes for carbon dioxide receptors. It also has some expansions of chemoreceptor genes, which may be adaptations to new grasses such as wheat.
