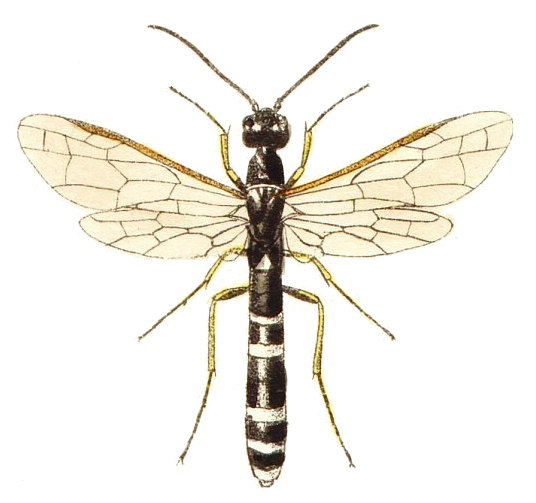
- Hartigia linearis (Cephidae)

Scientific classification
- Domain: Eukaryota
- Kingdom: Animalia
- Phylum: Arthropoda
- Class: Insecta
- Order: Hymenoptera
- Clade: Unicalcarida; Newman, 1834
- Superfamily: Cephoidea; Newman, 1835

Families
- Cephidae; †Sepulcidae

= Cephoidea =

Superfamily of sawflies

Cephoidea is a small superfamily within the Symphyta, commonly referred to as stem sawflies, containing some 100 species in 10 genera in the living family, Cephidae, plus another 17 genera in the extinct family Sepulcidae. They first appeared around 212 million years ago in the Norian Age, and are diurnal. Most species occur in the Northern Hemisphere, especially in Eurasia. The larvae are stem borers in various plants, especially grasses, but sometimes other herbaceous plants, shrubs, or trees. A few are pests of cereal grains (e.g. Cephus cinctus, which attacks wheat). They are exceptionally slender for symphytans, often resembling other types of wasps, and they are the only Symphyta which lack cenchri. They are sometimes postulated to be the sister taxon to the Apocrita, though the Orussidae are more commonly considered such.

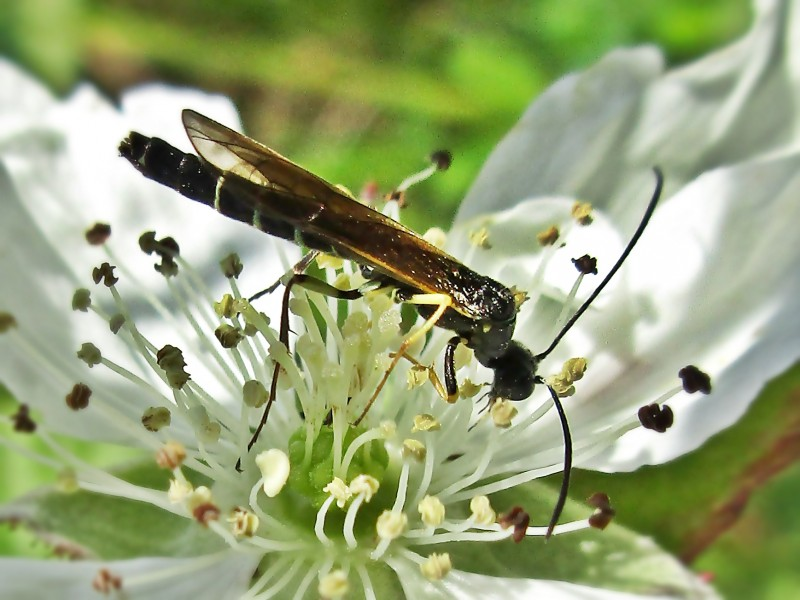
Calameuta filiformis
