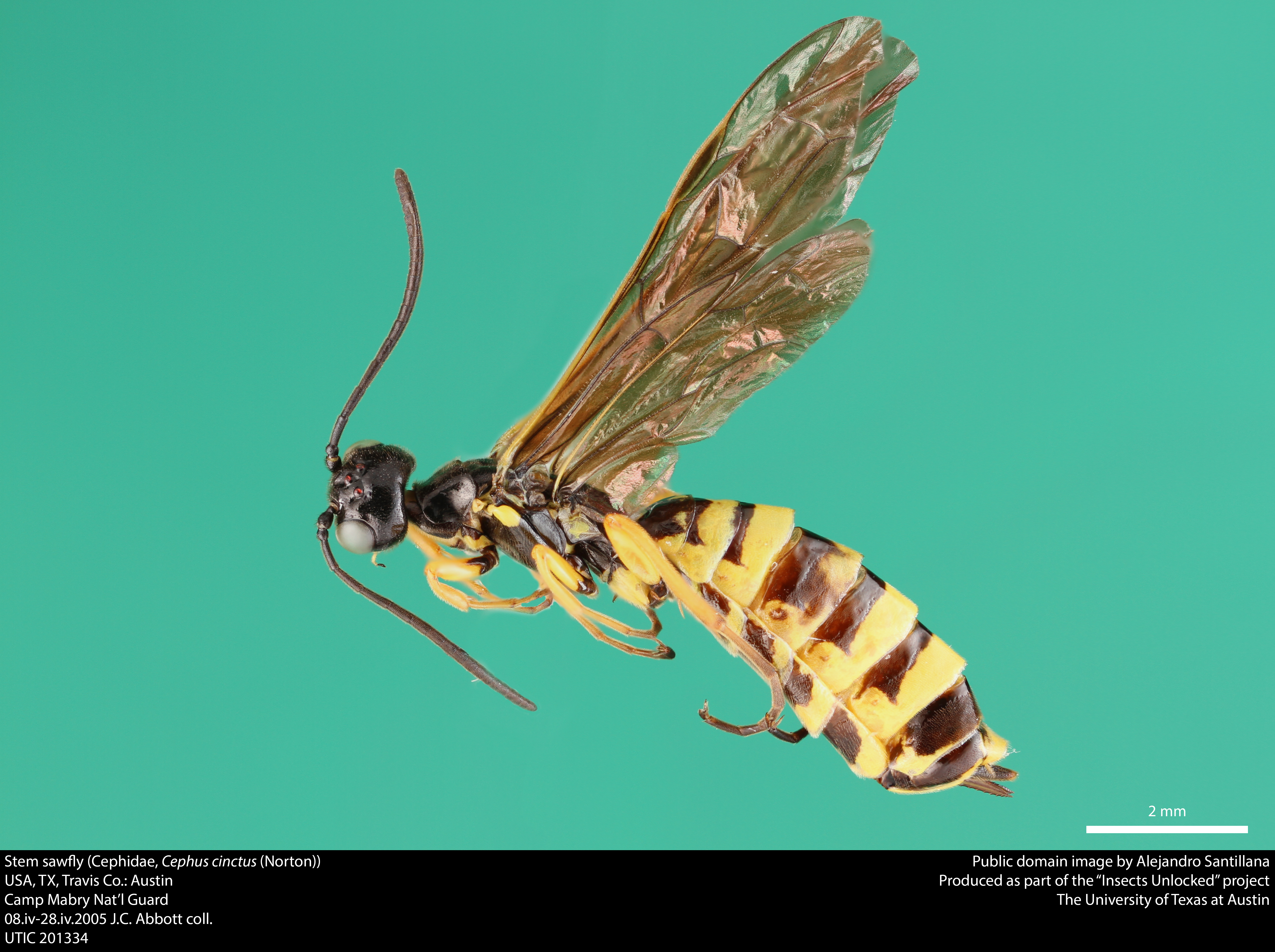
- Cephus cinctus

Scientific classification
- Kingdom: Animalia
- Phylum: Arthropoda
- Class: Insecta
- Order: Hymenoptera
- Family: Cephidae
- Genus: Cephus; Latreille, 1802

= Cephus =

Genus of sawflies

Cephus is a genus of sawflies belonging to the family Cephidae.

The genus was first described by Latreille in 1802.

The species of this genus are found in Europe and North America.

== Species ==
The following species are recognised in the genus Cephus:

- Cephus berytensis (Pic, 1916)
- Cephus brachycercus Thomson, 1871
- Cephus cinctus Norton
- Cephus citriniventris Pic, 1917
- Cephus daghestanicus (Dovnar-Zapolskij, 1931)
- Cephus excisus (Dovnar-Zapolskij, 1931)
- Cephus fumipennis Eversmann, 1847
- Cephus gaullei Konow, 1896
- Cephus gracilicornis Konow, 1896
- Cephus gracilis Costa, 1860
- Cephus infuscatus Thomson, 1871
- Cephus lateralis Konow, 1894
- Cephus luteonotatus Pic, 1918
- Cephus maroccanus Lacourt, 1995
- Cephus nigricarpus André, 1881
- Cephus nigrinus Thomson, 1871
- Cephus notatus Kokujev, 1910
- Cephus obscuriventris Pic, 1918
- Cephus parvus (Dovnar-Zapolskij, 1931)
- Cephus politissimus Costa, 1888
- Cephus pseudopilosulus Dovnar-Zapolskij, 1926
- Cephus pulcher Tischbein, 1852
- Cephus pygmeus (Linnaeus, 1767)
- Cephus rjabovi Dovnar-Zapolskij, 1926
- Cephus runcator Konow, 1896
- Cephus sareptanus Dovnar-Zapolskij, 1928
- Cephus spinipes (Panzer, 1800)
- Cephus zahaikevitshi (Ermolenko, 1971)
