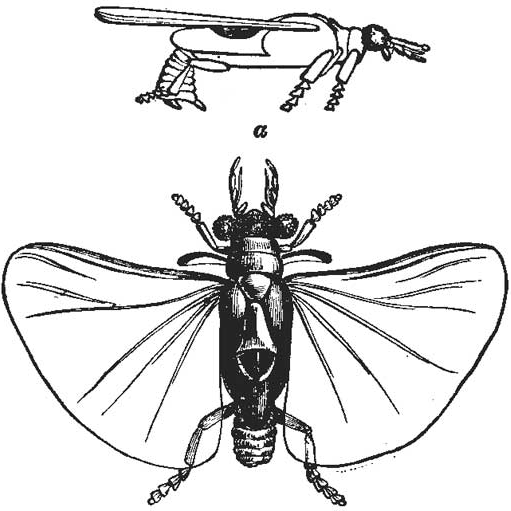
- Stylops childreni

Scientific classification
- Kingdom: Animalia
- Phylum: Arthropoda
- Clade: Pancrustacea
- Class: Insecta
- Order: Strepsiptera
- Family: Stylopidae; Kirby, 1813

Synonyms
- Hylecthridae Pierce, 1908

= Stylopidae =

Stylopidae Temporal range: Priabonian–Recent

Family of insects

Stylopidae is a family in the order Strepsiptera. There are about 15 genera and more than 330 described species in Stylopidae.

All Strepsiptera, including all members of Stylopidae are parasitic insects. Host insects of this family that are afflicted are referred to as being "stylopized".

Stylopidae (not to be confused with the clade Stylopidia) are strictly parasites of bees. However, other strepsipteran families such as Corioxenidae, Elenchidae, Halictophagidae, Myrmecolacidae, and Xenidae are known to use members of Blattodea, Mantodea, Orthoptera, Hemiptera, Diptera, and other Hymenoptera as hosts. Stylopized hosts sometimes display a variety of physical and behavioral changes.

== Life cycle ==
As with others in the order Strepsiptera, Stylopidae larvae called triungulins, or more properly, planidia, enter their host and develop inside it. Females will remain inside the host. When females are ready to breed, they will push their head and brood canal opening, which is located just behind their head, out between the host insect's sclerites. Females draw males with pheromones who mate with them by means of the exposed brood canal. The eggs will hatch inside of their mother, and the larvae will feed on her body until it is time for them to exit through the brood canal and find their own hosts, most often by exploiting phoresy.

== Genera ==
- Crawfordia Pierce, 1908
- Eurystylops Bohart, 1943
- Halictoxenos Pierce, 1908
- Hylecthrus Saunders, 1850
- Melittostylops Kinzelbach, 1971
- Stylops Kirby, 1802
- †Jantarostylops Kulicka, 2001 (Baltic amber, Priabonian)
