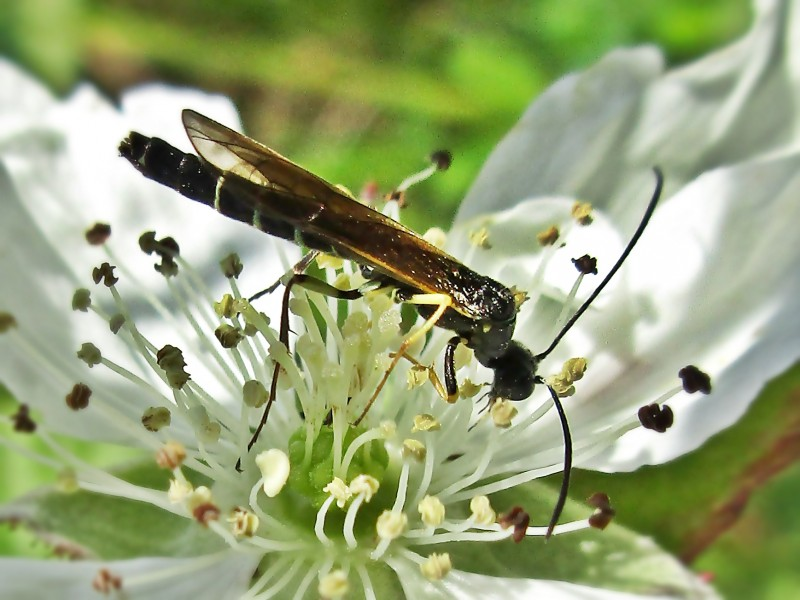
- Calameuta filiformis

Scientific classification
- Kingdom: Animalia
- Phylum: Arthropoda
- Class: Insecta
- Order: Hymenoptera
- Superfamily: Cephoidea
- Family: Cephidae

= Cephidae =

Family of sawflies

Cephidae is a family of stem sawflies in the order Hymenoptera. There are about 27 genera and more than 160 described species in Cephidae.

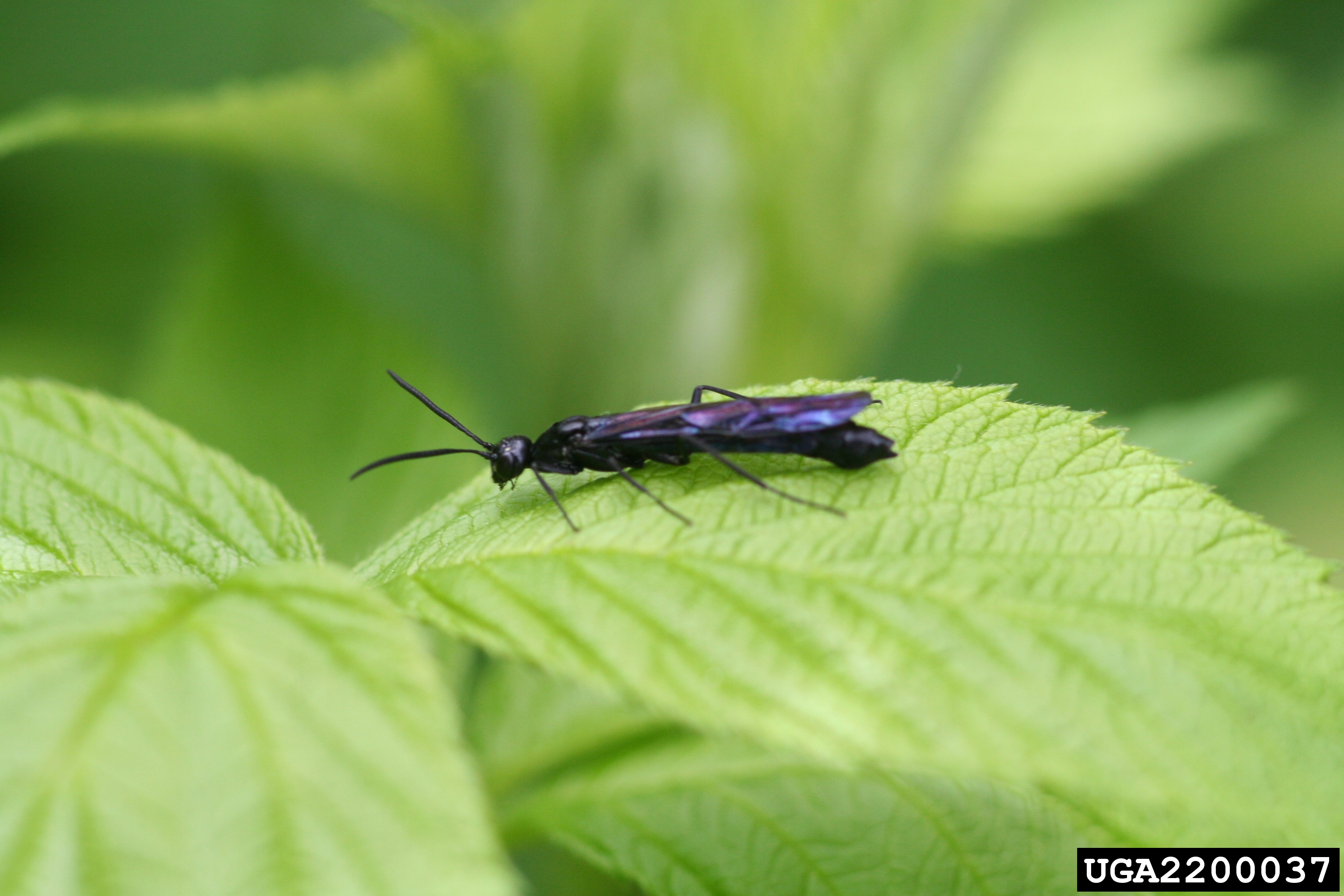
Hartigia trimaculata

== Genera ==
These 27 genera belong to the family Cephidae:

- Athetocephus Benson, 1935
- Australcephus Smith & Schmidt, 2009
- Caenocephus Strobl, 1895
- Calameuta Konow, 1896
- † Cephites Heer, 1849
- Cephus Latreille, 1802
- Characopygus Konow, 1899
- † Cuspilongus Archibald & Rasnitsyn, 2015
- † Electrocephus Konow, 1897
- Heterojanus Wei & Xiao, 2011
- Janus Stephens, 1829
- Jungicephus Maa, 1949
- Koreocephus Wei & Lee, 2018
- Magnitarsijanus Wei, 2007
- Megajanus Wei, 1999
- † Mesocephus Rasnitsyn, 1968
- Miscocephus Wei, 1999
- Pachycephus J.P.E.F.Stein, 1876
- Phylloecus Newman, 1838
- Sinicephus Maa, 1949
- Stenocephus Shinohara, 1999
- Stigmatijanus Wei, 2007
- Sulawesius Smith & Shinohara, 2002
- Syrista Konow, 1896
- Tibetajanus Wei, 1996
- Trachelus Jurine, 1807
- Urosyrista Maa, 1944
