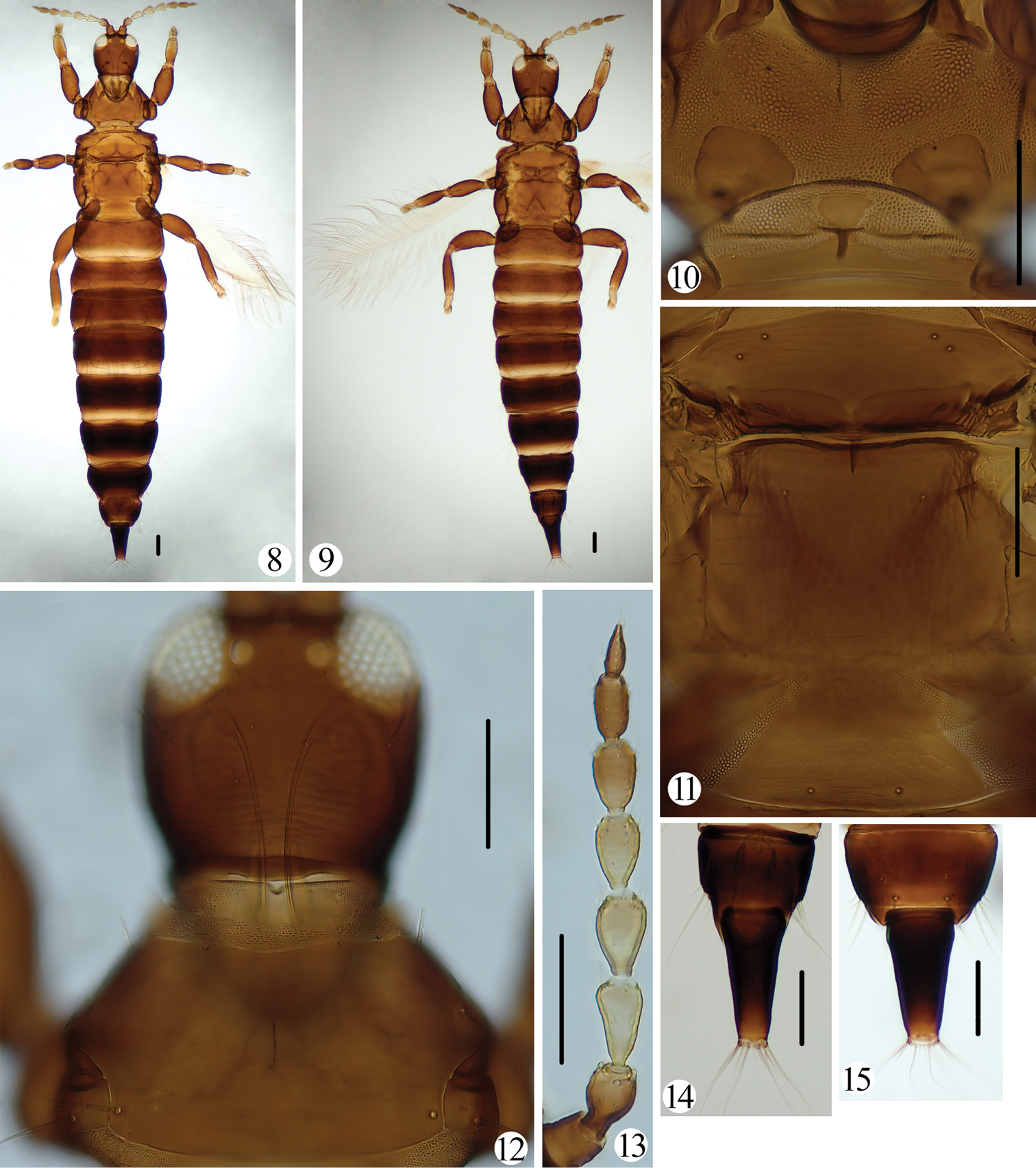
- Psephenothrips eriobotryae

Scientific classification
- Domain: Eukaryota
- Kingdom: Animalia
- Phylum: Arthropoda
- Class: Insecta
- Order: Thysanoptera
- Family: Phlaeothripidae
- Subfamily: Phlaeothripinae; Uzel, 1895

Genera
- hundreds, see text.

Diversity
- 367 genera, many species

= Phlaeothripinae =

Subfamily of thrips

The Phlaeothripinae are a subfamily of thrips, with hundreds of genera.

The Clidemia thrips Liothrips urichi, and the alligator weed thrips Amynothrips andersoni belong to this subfamily.

== Genera ==
This list of genera in the subfamily Phlaeothripinae is complete according to the Thrips of the World Checklist (January 4, 2007).

- Ablemothrips
- Acaciothrips
- Acanthothrips
- Aclystothrips
- Acrosothrips
- Adamantothrips
- Adelphothrips
- Adraneothrips
- Adrothrips
- Adurothrips
- Advenathrips
- Aeglothrips
- Aesthetothrips
- Afrothrips
- Agnostochthona
- Agrothrips
- Agynaikothrips
- Aiganothrips
- Akainothrips
- Akthethrips
- Alerothrips
- Aleurodothrips
- Alloiothrips
- Alocothrips
- Amothrips
- Amphibolothrips
- Amynothrips
- Ananthakrishnana
- Ananthakrishnanothrips
- Andrethrips
- Androthrips
- Apelaunothrips
- Apostlethrips
- Apterygothrips
- Araeothrips
- Arrhenothrips
- Asemothrips
- Asianthrips
- Ataliothrips
- Athlibothrips
- Aulothrips
- Austrothrips
- Ayyarothrips
- Azaleothrips
- Baenothrips
- Bagnalliella
- Bamboosiella
- Bebelothrips
- Biconothrips
- Blepharidothrips
- Boothrips
- Brachythrips
- Bradythrips
- Brakothrips
- Bunothrips
- Byctothrips
- Calamothrips
- Callithrips
- Carathrips
- Carcinothrips
- Carissothrips
- Carius
- Cartomothrips
- Cecidothrips
- Cephalothrips
- Cephenothrips
- Chaetokarnyia
- Chalepothrips
- Chamaeothrips
- Chelaeothrips
- Chiraplothrips
- Chiridothrips
- Chiridurothrips
- Chirothripoides
- Chlarathrips
- Choleothrips
- Chorithrips
- Chortothrips
- Chromatothrips
- Chthonothrips
- Claustrothrips
- Conocephalothrips
- Corroboreethrips
- Corycidothrips
- Coryphothrips
- Coxothrips
- Craniothrips
- Crespithrips
- Crinitothrips
- Crotonothrips
- Csirothrips
- Dactylothrips
- Deplorothrips
- Dexiothrips
- Dimorphothrips
- Diphyothrips
- Dixothrips
- Docessissophothrips
- Dolicholepta
- Dolichothrips
- Domatiathrips
- Domeothrips
- Dopothrips
- Dunatothrips
- Dyothrips
- Dyscolothrips
- Ecacanthothrips
- Eothrips
- Eparsothrips
- Epomisothrips
- Eschatothrips
- Eugynothrips
- Eumorphothrips
- Euoplothrips
- Eupathithrips
- Eurhynchothrips
- Euryaplothrips
- Eurynothrips
- Eurythrips
- Eurytrichothrips
- Gabonothrips
- Gemmathrips
- Gigantothrips
- Glaridothrips
- Glenothrips
- Glubothrips
- Gluphothrips
- Glyptothrips
- Gnophothrips
- Godoythrips
- Gomphiothrips
- Goniothrips
- Grypothrips
- Gymnothrips
- Gynaikothrips
- Habrothrips
- Hadothrips
- Halothrips
- Hansonthrips
- Hapedothrips
- Hapelothrips
- Haplothrips
- Hapsidothrips
- Heligmothrips
- Heliothripoides
- Heptadikothrips
- Hexadikothrips
- Hindsiothrips
- Holcothrips
- Holopothrips
- Holothrips
- Hoodiana
- Hoplandrothrips
- Hoplothrips
- Horistothrips
- Hyidiothrips
- Idiothrips
- Iniothrips
- Iotatubothrips
- Isotrichothrips
- Jacobothrips
- Jacotia
- Jennythrips
- Karnyothrips
- Katothrips
- Kellyia
- Kladothrips
- Kochummania
- Koptothrips
- Kolia
- Leeuwenia
- Leptoliothrips
- Leptothrips
- Lichanothrips
- Liophlaeothrips
- Liothrips
- Liotrichothrips
- Lispothrips
- Lissothrips
- Litotetothrips
- Lizalothrips
- Logadothrips
- Lonchothrips
- Lygothrips
- Macrophthalmothrips
- Majerthrips
- Malacothrips
- Mallothrips
- Manothrips
- Margaritothrips
- Mastigothrips
- Mathetithrips
- Matilethrips
- Maurithrips
- Maxillata
- Maxillithrips
- Medogothrips
- Megeugynothrips
- Membrothrips
- Menothrips
- Mesicothrips
- Mesothrips
- Metriothrips
- Microdontothrips
- Mimothrips
- Mixothrips
- Moultonides
- Murphythrips
- Mutothrips
- Mychiothrips
- Myopothrips
- Mystrothrips
- Necrothrips
- Neocecidothrips
- Neodixothrips
- Neohoodiella
- Neothrips
- Neurothrips
- Ocnothrips
- Octurothrips
- Ocythrips
- Oidanothrips
- Okajimathrips
- Opidnothrips
- Orthothrips
- Ostlingothrips
- Pachyliothrips
- Panceratothrips
- Panoplothrips
- Parabaphothrips
- Paracholeothrips
- Paramystrothrips
- Pedoeothrips
- Pegothrips
- Pentagonothrips
- Phallothrips
- Phasmothrips
- Phenicothrips
- Phenothrips
- Phiarothrips
- Philothrips
- Phlaeothrips
- Phorinothrips
- Phylladothrips
- Pistillothrips
- Plagiothrips
- Plectrothrips
- Pleurothrips
- Plicothrips
- Pnigmothrips
- Podothrips
- Poecilothrips
- Polygonothrips
- Pongola
- Ponticulothrips
- Porcothrips
- Praeciputhrips
- Praepodothrips
- Preeriella
- Priesneria
- Priesnerothrips
- Pristothrips
- Prohaplothrips
- Proleeuwenia
- Propealiothrips
- Propesolomonthrips
- Prosantothrips
- Protolispothrips
- Psalidothrips
- Pselaphothrips
- Psenothrips
- Psephenothrips
- Pseudophilothrips
- Pueblothrips
- Pygmaeothrips
- Pyknothrips
- Ramakrishnaiella
- Retiothrips
- Rhaptothrips
- Rhinoceps
- Rhopalothripoides
- Rosingothrips
- Sacothrips
- Sagenothrips
- Sakimurella
- Salothrips
- Sartrithrips
- Sauridothrips
- Scelothrips
- Schazothrips
- Schedothrips
- Schlechtendalia
- Schwarzithrips
- Scopaeothrips
- Sedulothrips
- Senarioliothrips
- Senegathrips
- Senithrips
- Sinuothrips
- Smicrothrips
- Socothrips
- Solomonthrips
- Sophikothrips
- Sophiothrips
- Sphingothrips
- Spilothrips
- Stannardiana
- Stannardothrips
- Stegothrips
- Stenocephalothrips
- Stephanothrips
- Stictothrips
- Stomothrips
- Strassenia
- Strepterothrips
- Streptothrips
- Sucinothrips
- Sumatrothrips
- Sunaitothrips
- Suocerathrips
- Symphyothrips
- Synergothrips
- Syringothrips
- Talitha
- Tamilthrips
- Temenothrips
- Terthrothrips
- Tetracanthothrips
- Tetradothrips
- Tetragonothrips
- Teuchothrips
- Thaumatothrips
- Thilakothrips
- Thlibothrips
- Thorybothrips
- Tolmetothrips
- Torvothrips
- Trachythrips
- Tragothrips
- Treherniella
- Triadothrips
- Trichinothrips
- Tropothrips
- Truncatothrips
- Trybomia
- Trypanothrips
- Tumidothrips
- Turmathrips
- Tylothrips
- Urothrips
- Veerabahuthrips
- Vicinothrips
- Vuilletia
- Walkerthrips
- Warithrips
- Weitschatithrips
- Williamsiella
- Xaniothrips
- Xeroleptothrips
- Xiphidothrips
- Xyelethrips
- Xylaplothrips
- Xyloplothrips
- Yarnkothrips
- Zaliothrips
- Zelotothrips
- Zemiathrips
- Zuluiella
