= Boothrips =

Scientific classification
- Kingdom: Animalia
- Phylum: Arthropoda
- Class: Insecta
- Order: Thysanoptera
- Family: Phlaeothripidae
- Subfamily: Phlaeothripinae
- Genus: Boothrips; Priesner, 1949

Genus of thrips

Boothrips is a genus of thrips in the family Phlaeothripidae.

== Species ==
- Boothrips singularis
