= Pristothrips =

Scientific classification
- Kingdom: Animalia
- Phylum: Arthropoda
- Class: Insecta
- Order: Thysanoptera
- Family: Phlaeothripidae
- Genus: Pristothrips; Hood, 1925

Genus of thrips

Pristothrips is a genus of thrips in the family Phlaeothripidae.

== Species ==
- Pristothrips aaptus
- Pristothrips albipunctatus
- Pristothrips pollostus
