= Suocerathrips =

Scientific classification
- Kingdom: Animalia
- Phylum: Arthropoda
- Class: Insecta
- Order: Thysanoptera
- Family: Phlaeothripidae
- Genus: Suocerathrips; Mound & Marullo, 1994

Genus of thrips

Suocerathrips is a genus of thrips in the family Phlaeothripidae.

== Species ==
- Suocerathrips linguis
