= Austrothrips =

Scientific classification
- Kingdom: Animalia
- Phylum: Arthropoda
- Class: Insecta
- Order: Thysanoptera
- Family: Phlaeothripidae
- Genus: Austrothrips; Brethes, 1915

Genus of thrips

Austrothrips is a genus of thrips in the family Phlaeothripidae.

== Species ==
- Austrothrips cochinchinensis
- Austrothrips flavitibia
- Austrothrips vanuaensis
- Austrothrips verae
