= Docessissophothrips =

Scientific classification
- Kingdom: Animalia
- Phylum: Arthropoda
- Class: Insecta
- Order: Thysanoptera
- Family: Phlaeothripidae
- Genus: Docessissophothrips; Bagnall, 1908

Genus of thrips

Docessissophothrips is a genus of thrips in the family Phlaeothripidae.

== Species ==
- Docessissophothrips ampliceps
- Docessissophothrips bonfilsi
- Docessissophothrips brasiliensis
- Docessissophothrips corticis
- Docessissophothrips cuneatus
- Docessissophothrips dotatus
- Docessissophothrips major
- Docessissophothrips rufescens
- Docessissophothrips tenuiceps
- Docessissophothrips tibialis
- Docessissophothrips travassosi
- Docessissophothrips villicornis
- Docessissophothrips woytkowskyi
- Docessissophothrips yupanqui
