= Stegothrips =

Scientific classification
- Kingdom: Animalia
- Phylum: Arthropoda
- Class: Insecta
- Order: Thysanoptera
- Family: Phlaeothripidae
- Genus: Stegothrips; Hood, 1934

Genus of thrips

Stegothrips is a genus of thrips in the family Phlaeothripidae.

== Species ==
- Stegothrips albiceps
- Stegothrips barronis
