= Craniothrips =

Scientific classification
- Kingdom: Animalia
- Phylum: Arthropoda
- Class: Insecta
- Order: Thysanoptera
- Family: Phlaeothripidae
- Genus: Craniothrips; Bagnall, 1915

Genus of thrips

Craniothrips is a genus of thrips in the family Phlaeothripidae.

== Species ==
- Craniothrips urichi
