= Neothrips =

Scientific classification
- Kingdom: Animalia
- Phylum: Arthropoda
- Class: Insecta
- Order: Thysanoptera
- Family: Phlaeothripidae
- Genus: Neothrips; Hood, 1908

Genus of thrips

Neothrips is a genus of thrips in the family Phlaeothripidae. According to Kirk and Terry (2003), Neothrips fasciatus, also known as the greenhouse thrips, is a major pest of greenhouse crops worldwide, causing damage to leaves, flowers, and fruits, and transmitting plant viruses. Similarly, Mound and Tree (2016) reported the discovery of a new species within the genus, Neothrips quasimodo, in Australia.

Research on Neothrips and other thrips species in the Phlaeothripidae family has focused on their ecology, behavior, and management strategies. Nault (1997) examined the arthropod transmission of plant viruses and proposed a new synthesis. Studies have also investigated the role of semiochemicals in attracting and repelling thrips and evaluated the effectiveness of biological control methods such as the use of predatory mites (Kirk and Terry, 2003).

In summary, Neothrips is a genus of tiny insects that includes pests of greenhouse crops and ornamental plants. Ongoing research aims to improve our understanding of their behavior and develop effective management strategies.

== Species ==
- Neothrips corticis
- Neothrips lepidus
- Neothrips obesus
