= Glyptothrips =

Scientific classification
- Kingdom: Animalia
- Phylum: Arthropoda
- Class: Insecta
- Order: Thysanoptera
- Family: Phlaeothripidae
- Genus: Glyptothrips; Hood, 1912

Genus of thrips

Glyptothrips is a genus of thrips in the family Phlaeothripidae.

== Species ==
- Glyptothrips arkansanus
- Glyptothrips bucca
- Glyptothrips claviger
- Glyptothrips divergens
- Glyptothrips flavescens
- Glyptothrips floridensis
- Glyptothrips fuscipes
- Glyptothrips hylaeus
- Glyptothrips interior
- Glyptothrips longiceps
- Glyptothrips reticulatus
- Glyptothrips saltuarius
- Glyptothrips silvaticus
- Glyptothrips subcalvus
