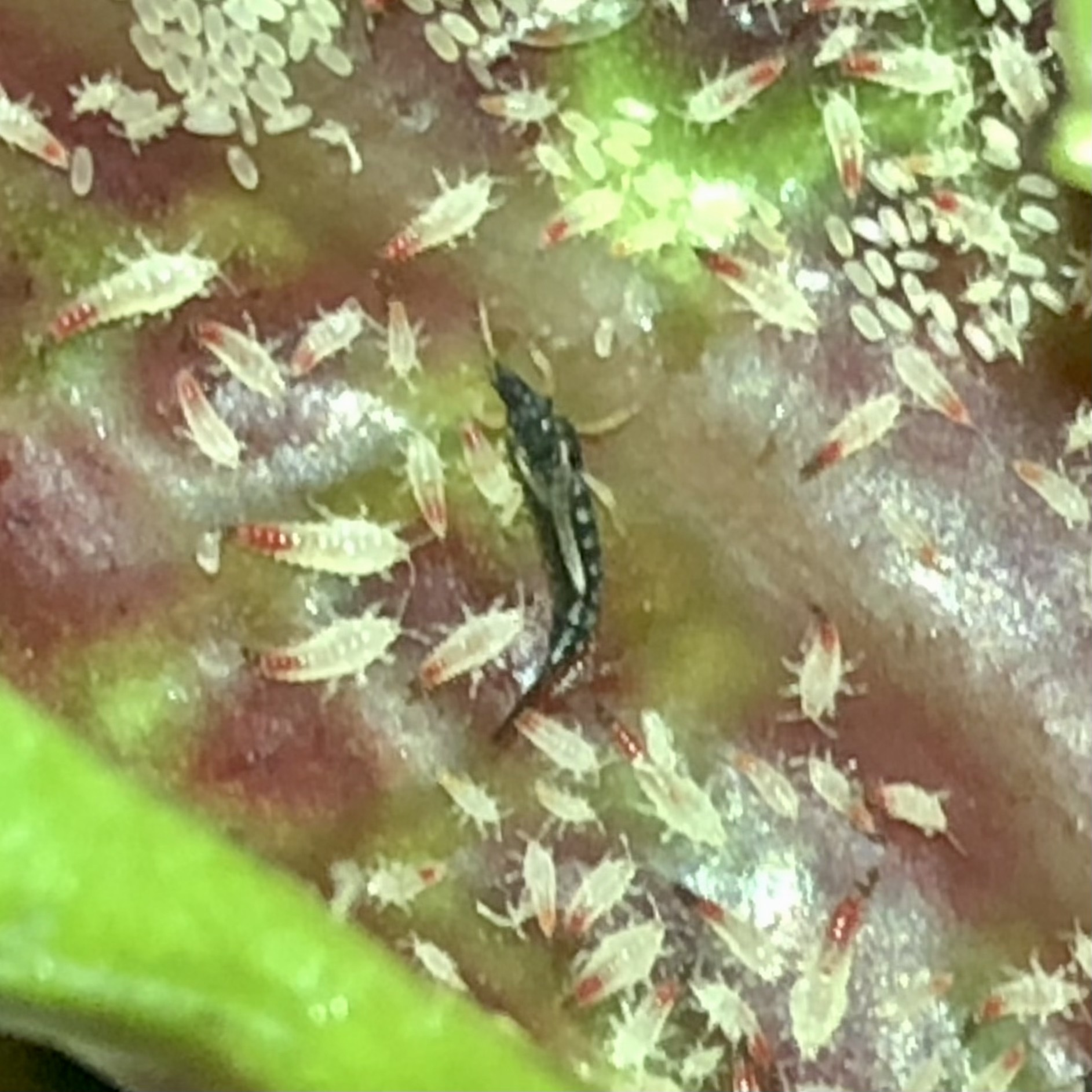
- Leeuwenia tetrastigmae

Scientific classification
- Kingdom: Animalia
- Phylum: Arthropoda
- Class: Insecta
- Order: Thysanoptera
- Family: Phlaeothripidae
- Genus: Leeuwenia; Karny, 1912

= Leeuwenia =

Genus of thrips

Leeuwenia is a genus of thrips in the family Phlaeothripidae.

== Species ==
- Leeuwenia aculeatrix
- Leeuwenia ananthakrishnani
- Leeuwenia angulata
- Leeuwenia arbastoae
- Leeuwenia ardisiae
- Leeuwenia caelatrix
- Leeuwenia convergens
- Leeuwenia coriacea
- Leeuwenia crocodilus
- Leeuwenia diospyri
- Leeuwenia eugeniae
- Leeuwenia fimbriatrix
- Leeuwenia flavicornata
- Leeuwenia gladiatrix
- Leeuwenia indica
- Leeuwenia karnyi
- Leeuwenia karnyiana
- Leeuwenia maculans
- Leeuwenia pasanii
- Leeuwenia polyosmae
- Leeuwenia pugnatrix
- Leeuwenia scolopiae
- Leeuwenia seriatrix
- Leeuwenia spinosus
- Leeuwenia taiwanensis
- Leeuwenia tetrastigmae
- Leeuwenia vorax
