= Hindsiothrips =

Scientific classification
- Kingdom: Animalia
- Phylum: Arthropoda
- Class: Insecta
- Order: Thysanoptera
- Family: Phlaeothripidae
- Genus: Hindsiothrips; Stannard, 1958

Genus of thrips

Hindsiothrips is a genus of thrips in the family Phlaeothripidae.

== Species ==
- Hindsiothrips bonessi
- Hindsiothrips navarrensis
- Hindsiothrips oettingeni
- Hindsiothrips pullatus
- Hindsiothrips robustisetis
- Hindsiothrips sisakhti
