= Amothrips =

Scientific classification
- Kingdom: Animalia
- Phylum: Arthropoda
- Class: Insecta
- Order: Thysanoptera
- Family: Phlaeothripidae
- Genus: Amothrips; Priesner, 1939

Genus of thrips

Amothrips is a genus of thrips in the family Phlaeothripidae with one living species.

== Species ==
- Amothrips ghesquierei
