= Tumidothrips =

Scientific classification
- Kingdom: Animalia
- Phylum: Arthropoda
- Class: Insecta
- Order: Thysanoptera
- Family: Phlaeothripidae
- Genus: Tumidothrips; Pelikan, 2004

Genus of thrips

Tumidothrips is a genus of thrips in the family Phlaeothripidae.

== Species ==
- Tumidothrips spiniceps
