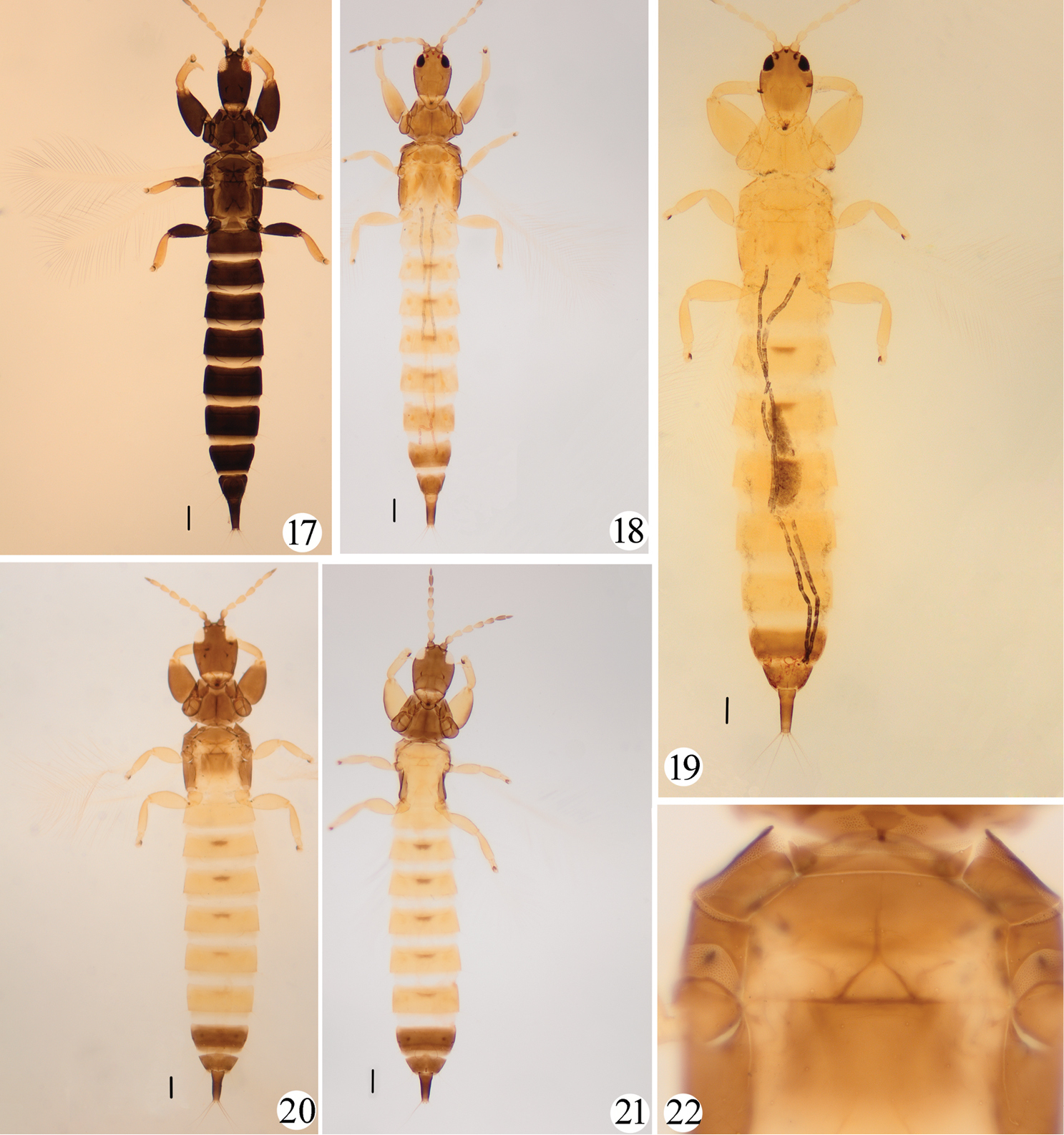

Scientific classification
- Kingdom: Animalia
- Phylum: Arthropoda
- Class: Insecta
- Order: Thysanoptera
- Family: Phlaeothripidae
- Genus: Podothrips; Hood, 1913

= Podothrips =

Genus of thrips

Podothrips is a genus of thrips in the family Phlaeothripidae.

== Species ==
- Podothrips anomalus
- Podothrips ardis
- Podothrips australis
- Podothrips bambusae
- Podothrips barrowi
- Podothrips bellatulus
- Podothrips bicolor
- Podothrips brasiliensis
- Podothrips canizoi
- Podothrips denticeps
- Podothrips distinctus
- Podothrips erami
- Podothrips ferrugineus
- Podothrips graminum
- Podothrips longiceps
- Podothrips lucasseni
- Podothrips luteus
- Podothrips moultoni
- Podothrips moundi
- Podothrips odonaspicola
- Podothrips orarius
- Podothrips orion
- Podothrips placitus
- Podothrips regina
- Podothrips ritchiei
- Podothrips sasacola
- Podothrips scitulus
- Podothrips semiflavus
- Podothrips turangi
- Podothrips websteri
- Podothrips xanthopus
