= Leptoliothrips =

Scientific classification
- Kingdom: Animalia
- Phylum: Arthropoda
- Class: Insecta
- Order: Thysanoptera
- Family: Phlaeothripidae
- Genus: Leptoliothrips; Moulton, 1927

Genus of thrips

Leptoliothrips is a genus of thrips in the family Phlaeothripidae.

== Species ==
- Leptoliothrips manilae
