= Byctothrips =

Scientific classification
- Kingdom: Animalia
- Phylum: Arthropoda
- Class: Insecta
- Order: Thysanoptera
- Family: Phlaeothripidae
- Genus: Byctothrips; Ananthakrishnan, 1973

Genus of thrips

Byctothrips is a genus of thrips in the family Phlaeothripidae.

== Species ==
- Byctothrips ayyari
