= Praeciputhrips =

Scientific classification
- Kingdom: Animalia
- Phylum: Arthropoda
- Class: Insecta
- Order: Thysanoptera
- Family: Phlaeothripidae
- Genus: Praeciputhrips; Reyes, 1994

Genus of thrips

Praeciputhrips is a genus of thrips in the family Phlaeothripidae.

== Species ==
- Praeciputhrips balli
