= Chaetokarnyia =

Scientific classification
- Kingdom: Animalia
- Phylum: Arthropoda
- Class: Insecta
- Order: Thysanoptera
- Family: Phlaeothripidae
- Genus: Chaetokarnyia; Priesner, 1952

Genus of thrips

Chaetokarnyia is a genus of thrips in the family Phlaeothripidae.

== Species ==
- Chaetokarnyia elegantulus
- Chaetokarnyia eugeniinus
- Chaetokarnyia macromma
- Chaetokarnyia tenuicornis
