= Lichanothrips =

Scientific classification
- Kingdom: Animalia
- Phylum: Arthropoda
- Class: Insecta
- Order: Thysanoptera
- Family: Phlaeothripidae
- Genus: Lichanothrips; Mound, 1971

Genus of thrips

Lichanothrips is a genus of thrips in the family Phlaeothripidae.

== Species ==
- Lichanothrips albus
- Lichanothrips calcis
- Lichanothrips curvatus
- Lichanothrips magnificus
- Lichanothrips metopus
- Lichanothrips pastinus
- Lichanothrips pulchra
- Lichanothrips semifuscipennis
- Lichanothrips triquetrus
- Lichanothrips xouthus
