= Chiridothrips =

Scientific classification
- Kingdom: Animalia
- Phylum: Arthropoda
- Class: Insecta
- Order: Thysanoptera
- Family: Phlaeothripidae
- Genus: Chiridothrips; Ramakrishna & Margabandhu, 1939

Genus of thrips

Chiridothrips is a genus of thrips in the family Phlaeothripidae.

== Species ==
- Chiridothrips fabiani
- Chiridothrips hartwigi
- Chiridothrips indicus
