= Trachythrips =

Scientific classification
- Kingdom: Animalia
- Phylum: Arthropoda
- Class: Insecta
- Order: Thysanoptera
- Family: Phlaeothripidae
- Genus: Trachythrips; Hood, 1930

Genus of thrips

Trachythrips is a genus of thrips in the family Phlaeothripidae.

== Species ==
- Trachythrips albipes
- Trachythrips astutus
- Trachythrips brevis
- Trachythrips brevitubus
- Trachythrips deleoni
- Trachythrips epimeralis
- Trachythrips frontalis
- Trachythrips gracilis
- Trachythrips seminole
- Trachythrips watsoni
- Trachythrips wirshingi
