= Baenothrips =

Scientific classification
- Kingdom: Animalia
- Phylum: Arthropoda
- Class: Insecta
- Order: Thysanoptera
- Family: Phlaeothripidae
- Genus: Baenothrips; Crawford, 1948

Genus of thrips (insects)

Baenothrips is a genus of thrips in the family Phlaeothripidae.

== Species ==
- Baenothrips asper
- Baenothrips caenosus
- Baenothrips chiliensis
- Baenothrips cuneatus
- Baenothrips erythrinus
- Baenothrips guatemalensis
- Baenothrips indicus
- Baenothrips minutus
- Baenothrips moundi
- Baenothrips murphyi
- Baenothrips quadratus
- Baenothrips ryukyuensis
