= Sagenothrips =

Scientific classification
- Kingdom: Animalia
- Phylum: Arthropoda
- Class: Insecta
- Order: Thysanoptera
- Family: Phlaeothripidae
- Genus: Sagenothrips; Priesner, 1933

Genus of thrips

Sagenothrips is a genus of thrips in the family Phlaeothripidae.

== Species ==
- Sagenothrips gracilicornis
