= Carius malgassus =

Scientific classification
- Kingdom: Animalia
- Phylum: Arthropoda
- Class: Insecta
- Order: Thysanoptera
- Family: Phlaeothripidae
- Genus: Carius; Faure, 1961
- Species: C. malgassus

Binomial name
- Carius malgassus Faure, 1961

Genus of thrips

Carius is a genus of thrips in the family Phlaeothripidae. It is monotypic, being represented by the single species Carius malgassus.
