= Sacothrips =

Scientific classification
- Kingdom: Animalia
- Phylum: Arthropoda
- Class: Insecta
- Order: Thysanoptera
- Family: Phlaeothripidae
- Genus: Sacothrips; Moulton, 1968

Genus of thrips

Sacothrips is a genus of thrips in the family Phlaeothripidae.

== Species ==
- Sacothrips bicolor
- Sacothrips catheter
- Sacothrips corycidis
- Sacothrips galbus
- Sacothrips ingens
- Sacothrips mantoideus
- Sacothrips milvus
