= Plagiothrips =

Scientific classification
- Kingdom: Animalia
- Phylum: Arthropoda
- Class: Insecta
- Order: Thysanoptera
- Family: Phlaeothripidae
- Genus: Plagiothrips (Priesner, 1968)

Genus of thrips

Plagiothrips is a monotypic genus of thrips in the family Phlaeothripidae.

== Species ==
- Plagiothrips eugeniae
