= Jacotia =

Scientific classification
- Kingdom: Animalia
- Phylum: Arthropoda
- Class: Insecta
- Order: Thysanoptera
- Family: Phlaeothripidae
- Genus: Jacotia; Faure, 1940

Genus of thrips

Jacotia is a genus of thrips in the family Phlaeothripidae.

== Species ==
- Jacotia elegiae
- Jacotia glyptus
- Jacotia idaeus
- Jacotia palmerae
- Jacotia rhodorcha
