= Strassenia =

Scientific classification
- Kingdom: Animalia
- Phylum: Arthropoda
- Class: Insecta
- Order: Thysanoptera
- Family: Phlaeothripidae
- Genus: Strassenia; Faure, 1959

Genus of thrips

Strassenia is a genus of thrips in the family Phlaeothripidae.

== Species ==
- Strassenia acarus
- Strassenia longisetis
