= Opidnothrips =

Scientific classification
- Kingdom: Animalia
- Phylum: Arthropoda
- Class: Insecta
- Order: Thysanoptera
- Family: Phlaeothripidae
- Genus: Opidnothrips; Ananthakrishnan, 1971

Genus of thrips

Opidnothrips is a monotypic genus of thrips in the family Phlaeothripidae.

== Species ==
- Opidnothrips corticulus
