= Dimorphothrips =

Scientific classification
- Kingdom: Animalia
- Phylum: Arthropoda
- Class: Insecta
- Order: Thysanoptera
- Family: Phlaeothripidae
- Genus: Dimorphothrips; Bagnall, 1928

Genus of thrips

Dimorphothrips is a genus of thrips in the family Phlaeothripidae.

== Species ==
- Dimorphothrips idoliceps
- Dimorphothrips microchaetus
