= Mallothrips =

Scientific classification
- Kingdom: Animalia
- Phylum: Arthropoda
- Class: Insecta
- Order: Thysanoptera
- Family: Phlaeothripidae
- Genus: Mallothrips; Ramakrishna, 1928

Genus of thrips

Mallothrips is a genus of thrips in the family Phlaeothripidae.

== Species ==
- Mallothrips flavipes
- Mallothrips giliomeei
- Mallothrips indica
