= Chiraplothrips =

Scientific classification
- Kingdom: Animalia
- Phylum: Arthropoda
- Class: Insecta
- Order: Thysanoptera
- Family: Phlaeothripidae
- Genus: Chiraplothrips; Priesner, 1931

Genus of thrips

Chiraplothrips is a genus of thrips in the family Phlaeothripidae.

== Species ==
- Chiraplothrips faureanus
- Chiraplothrips graminellus
- Chiraplothrips sudanensis
