= Ablemothrips =

Scientific classification
- Kingdom: Animalia
- Phylum: Arthropoda
- Class: Insecta
- Order: Thysanoptera
- Family: Phlaeothripidae
- Genus: Ablemothrips; Ananthakrishnan, 1969

Genus of thrips

Ablemothrips is a genus of thrips in the family Phlaeothripidae. It occurs in Asia, with two species recorded from Thailand and one species occurring in India, southern Japan, the Philippines, and Taiwan.

== Species ==
- Ablemothrips breviceps
- Ablemothrips longiceps
- Ablemothrips maxillatus
