= Pachyliothrips =

Scientific classification
- Kingdom: Animalia
- Phylum: Arthropoda
- Class: Insecta
- Order: Thysanoptera
- Family: Phlaeothripidae
- Genus: Pachyliothrips; Okajima, 2006

Genus of thrips

Pachyliothrips is a monotypic genus of thrips in the family Phlaeothripidae.

== Species ==
- Pachyliothrips zelkovae
