= Mixothrips =

Scientific classification
- Kingdom: Animalia
- Phylum: Arthropoda
- Class: Insecta
- Order: Thysanoptera
- Family: Phlaeothripidae
- Genus: Mixothrips; Stannard, 1968

Genus of thrips

Mixothrips is a genus of thrips in the family Phlaeothripidae.

== Species ==
- Mixothrips craigheadi
- Mixothrips nakaharai
