= Terthrothrips =

Scientific classification
- Kingdom: Animalia
- Phylum: Arthropoda
- Class: Insecta
- Order: Thysanoptera
- Family: Phlaeothripidae
- Genus: Terthrothrips; Karny, 1925

Genus of thrips

Terthrothrips is a genus of thrips in the family Phlaeothripidae.

== Species ==
- Terthrothrips ananthakrishnani
- Terthrothrips apterus
- Terthrothrips balteatus
- Terthrothrips bicinctus
- Terthrothrips bruesi
- Terthrothrips brunneus
- Terthrothrips bucculentus
- Terthrothrips bullifer
- Terthrothrips carens
- Terthrothrips fuscatus
- Terthrothrips gracilicornis
- Terthrothrips hebes
- Terthrothrips impolitus
- Terthrothrips irretitus
- Terthrothrips levigatus
- Terthrothrips luteolus
- Terthrothrips magnicauda
- Terthrothrips marginatus
- Terthrothrips palmatus
- Terthrothrips parvus
- Terthrothrips peltatus
- Terthrothrips percultus
- Terthrothrips sanguinolentus
- Terthrothrips serratus
- Terthrothrips sordidus
- Terthrothrips strasseni
- Terthrothrips trigonius
- Terthrothrips unicinctus
- Terthrothrips viduus
