= Phylladothrips =

Scientific classification
- Kingdom: Animalia
- Phylum: Arthropoda
- Class: Insecta
- Order: Thysanoptera
- Family: Phlaeothripidae
- Genus: Phylladothrips; Priesner, 1933

Genus of thrips

Phylladothrips is a genus of thrips in the family Phlaeothripidae.

== Species ==
- Phylladothrips bispinosus
- Phylladothrips fasciae
- Phylladothrips gracilis
- Phylladothrips karnyi
- Phylladothrips lateralis
- Phylladothrips niger
- Phylladothrips pallidus
- Phylladothrips pictus
- Phylladothrips similis
