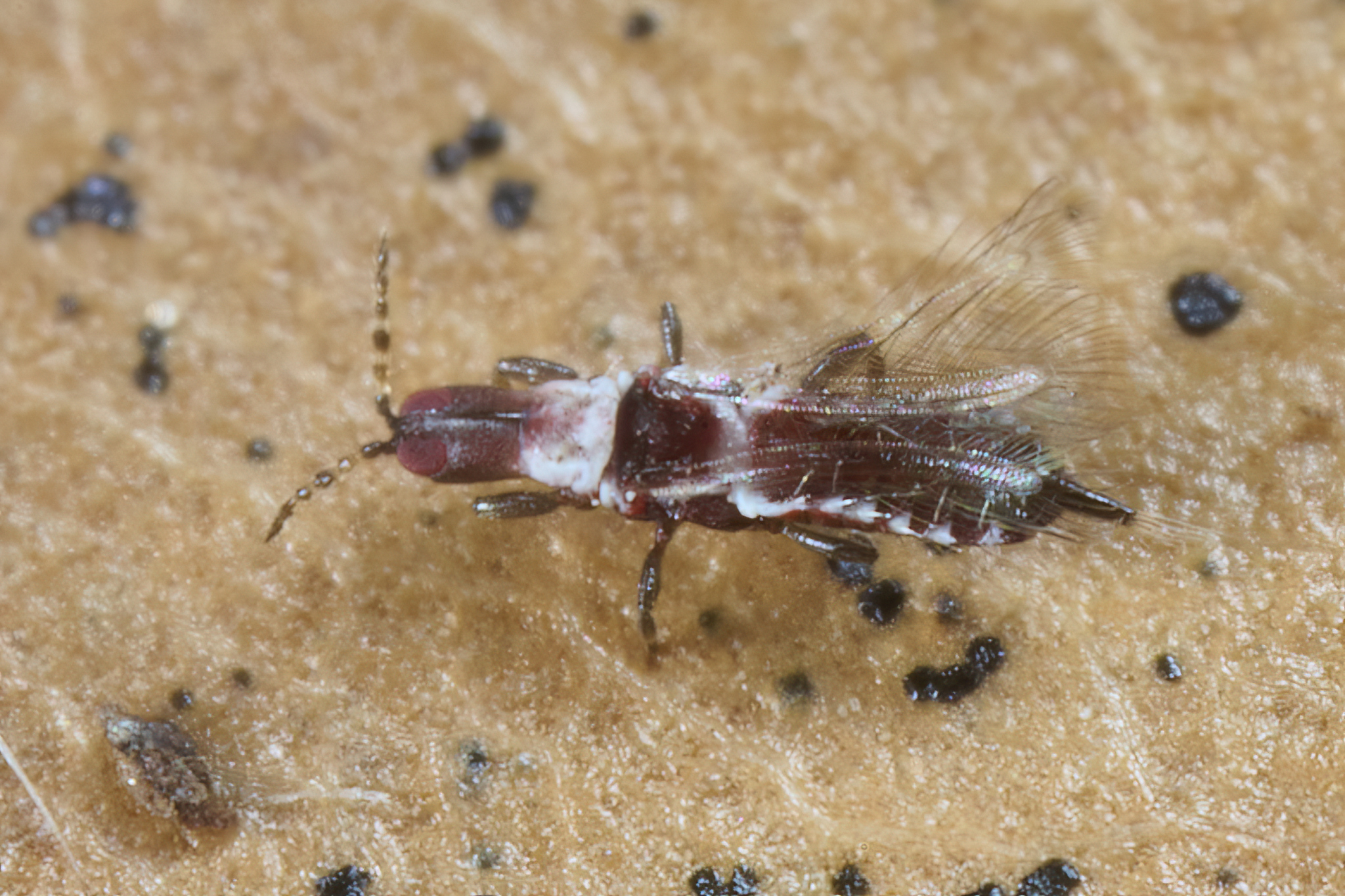
- Poecilothrips albopictus

Scientific classification
- Kingdom: Animalia
- Phylum: Arthropoda
- Class: Insecta
- Order: Thysanoptera
- Family: Phlaeothripidae
- Genus: Poecilothrips; Uzel, 1895

= Poecilothrips =

Genus of thrips

Poecilothrips is a genus of thrips in the family Phlaeothripidae.

== Species ==
- Poecilothrips albopictus
- Poecilothrips dens
- Poecilothrips nubilus
