= Heliothripoides =

Scientific classification
- Kingdom: Animalia
- Phylum: Arthropoda
- Class: Insecta
- Order: Thysanoptera
- Family: Phlaeothripidae
- Genus: Heliothripoides; Okajima, 1987

Genus of thrips

Heliothripoides is a genus of thrips in the family Phlaeothripidae.

== Species ==
- Heliothripoides boltoni
- Heliothripoides reticulatus
