= Prohaplothrips =

Scientific classification
- Kingdom: Animalia
- Phylum: Arthropoda
- Class: Insecta
- Order: Thysanoptera
- Family: Phlaeothripidae
- Genus: Prohaplothrips; Schliephake, 2000

Genus of thrips

Prohaplothrips is a genus of thrips in the family Phlaeothripidae.

== Species ==
- †Prohaplothrips iunctostylosus
