= Jennythrips =

Scientific classification
- Kingdom: Animalia
- Phylum: Arthropoda
- Class: Insecta
- Order: Thysanoptera
- Family: Phlaeothripidae
- Genus: Jennythrips (Bhatti, 1993)

Genus of thrips

Jennythrips is a monotypic genus of thrips in the family Phlaeothripidae.

== Species ==
- Jennythrips jasmini
