= Chirothripoides =

Scientific classification
- Kingdom: Animalia
- Phylum: Arthropoda
- Clade: Pancrustacea
- Class: Insecta
- Order: Thysanoptera
- Family: Phlaeothripidae
- Genus: Chirothripoides; Bagnall, 1915

Genus of thrips

Chirothripoides is a genus of thrips in the family Phlaeothripidae.

== Species ==
- Chirothripoides brahmaputrai
- Chirothripoides dendropogonus
- Chirothripoides faurei
- Chirothripoides hexodon
- †Chirothripoidea hisakoae (extinct)
- Chirothripoides malayensis
- Chirothripoides typicus
