= Xiphidothrips =

Scientific classification
- Kingdom: Animalia
- Phylum: Arthropoda
- Class: Insecta
- Order: Thysanoptera
- Family: Phlaeothripidae
- Genus: Xiphidothrips; Priesner, 1951

Genus of thrips

Xiphidothrips is a genus of thrips in the family Phlaeothripidae.

== Species ==
- Xiphidothrips tambourissae
