= Eurythrips =

Scientific classification
- Kingdom: Animalia
- Phylum: Arthropoda
- Class: Insecta
- Order: Thysanoptera
- Family: Phlaeothripidae
- Genus: Eurythrips; Hinds, 1902

Genus of thrips

Eurythrips is a genus of thrips in the family Phlaeothripidae.

== Species ==
- Eurythrips alarius
- Eurythrips ampliventralis
- Eurythrips batesi
- Eurythrips bifasciatus
- Eurythrips bisetosus
- Eurythrips citricollis
- Eurythrips citricornis
- Eurythrips conformis
- Eurythrips costalimai
- Eurythrips cruralis
- Eurythrips defectus
- Eurythrips dissimilis
- Eurythrips edwini
- Eurythrips elongatus
- Eurythrips forticornis
- Eurythrips fuscipennis
- Eurythrips genarum
- Eurythrips hemimeres
- Eurythrips hindsi
- Eurythrips hookae
- Eurythrips longilabris
- Eurythrips modestus
- Eurythrips musivi
- Eurythrips nigriceps
- Eurythrips nigricornis
- Eurythrips peccans
- Eurythrips pettiti
- Eurythrips pusillus
- Eurythrips saidamhedi
- Eurythrips setosus
- Eurythrips simplex
- Eurythrips striolatus
- Eurythrips subflavus
- Eurythrips tarsalis
- Eurythrips trifasciatus
- Eurythrips tristis
- Eurythrips umbrisetis
- Eurythrips virginianus
- Eurythrips watsoni
