= Mystrothrips =

Scientific classification
- Kingdom: Animalia
- Phylum: Arthropoda
- Class: Insecta
- Order: Thysanoptera
- Family: Phlaeothripidae
- Genus: Mystrothrips; Priesner, 1949

Genus of thrips

Mystrothrips is a genus of thrips in the family Phlaeothripidae.

== Species ==
- Mystrothrips clavatoris
- Mystrothrips dammermani
- Mystrothrips dilatus
- Mystrothrips flavidus
- Mystrothrips levis
- Mystrothrips longantennus
- Mystrothrips nipponicus
- Mystrothrips reteanum
