= Acrosothrips =

Acrosothrips asymmetricus

Scientific classification
- Kingdom: Animalia
- Phylum: Arthropoda
- Class: Insecta
- Order: Thysanoptera
- Family: Phlaeothripidae
- Genus: Acrosothrips; Stannard, 1963
- Species: A. asymmetricus

Binomial name
- Acrosothrips asymmetricus (Watson, 1937)

Genus of thrips

Acrosothrips is a genus of thrips in the family Phlaeothripidae. It is monotypic, being represented by the single species Acrosothrips asymmetricus.
