= Dolichothrips =

Scientific classification
- Kingdom: Animalia
- Phylum: Arthropoda
- Class: Insecta
- Order: Thysanoptera
- Family: Phlaeothripidae
- Genus: Dolichothrips; Karny, 1912

Genus of thrips

Dolichothrips is a genus of thrips in the family Phlaeothripidae.

== Species ==
- Dolichothrips amygdali
- Dolichothrips assimilis
- Dolichothrips chikakoae
- Dolichothrips citripes
- Dolichothrips confusus
- Dolichothrips crassusensus
- Dolichothrips eriae
- Dolichothrips fialae
- Dolichothrips franae
- Dolichothrips fumipennis
- Dolichothrips fuscipes
- Dolichothrips indicus
- Dolichothrips longicollis
- Dolichothrips macarangai
- Dolichothrips malhavii
- Dolichothrips montanus
- Dolichothrips ochripes
- Dolichothrips reuteri
- Dolichothrips utae
- Dolichothrips varipes
- Dolichothrips zyziphi
