= Maurithrips =

Scientific classification
- Kingdom: Animalia
- Phylum: Arthropoda
- Class: Insecta
- Order: Thysanoptera
- Family: Phlaeothripidae
- Genus: Maurithrips; Mamet, 1967

Genus of thrips

Maurithrips is a genus of thrips in the family Phlaeothripidae.

== Species ==
- Maurithrips spinulosus
