= Paramystrothrips =

Scientific classification
- Kingdom: Animalia
- Phylum: Arthropoda
- Class: Insecta
- Order: Thysanoptera
- Family: Phlaeothripidae
- Genus: Paramystrothrips; Bournier, 1971

Genus of thrips

Paramystrothrips is a genus of thrips in the family Phlaeothripidae.

== Species ==
- Paramystrothrips leclanti
- Paramystrothrips moundi
- Paramystrothrips ophthalmus
- Paramystrothrips orientalis
