= Lygothrips =

Scientific classification
- Kingdom: Animalia
- Phylum: Arthropoda
- Class: Insecta
- Order: Thysanoptera
- Family: Phlaeothripidae
- Genus: Lygothrips; Ananthakrishnan, 1964

Genus of thrips

Lygothrips is a genus of thrips in the family Phlaeothripidae.

== Species ==
- Lygothrips bournieri
- Lygothrips jambuvasi
