= Veerabahuthrips =

Scientific classification
- Kingdom: Animalia
- Phylum: Arthropoda
- Class: Insecta
- Order: Thysanoptera
- Family: Phlaeothripidae
- Genus: Veerabahuthrips; Ramakrishna, 1932

Genus of thrips

Veerabahuthrips is a genus of thrips in the family Phlaeothripidae.

== Species ==
- Veerabahuthrips bambusae
- Veerabahuthrips clarus
- Veerabahuthrips crassipes
- Veerabahuthrips exilis
- Veerabahuthrips fruticola
- Veerabahuthrips longicornis
- Veerabahuthrips simplex
- Veerabahuthrips tridentatus
