= Sophikothrips =

Scientific classification
- Kingdom: Animalia
- Phylum: Arthropoda
- Class: Insecta
- Order: Thysanoptera
- Family: Phlaeothripidae
- Genus: Sophikothrips; Mound, 1970

Genus of thrips

Sophikothrips is a genus of thrips in the family Phlaeothripidae.

== Species ==
- Sophikothrips malaitae
