= Eupathithrips =

Scientific classification
- Kingdom: Animalia
- Phylum: Arthropoda
- Class: Insecta
- Order: Thysanoptera
- Family: Phlaeothripidae
- Genus: Eupathithrips; Bagnall, 1908

Genus of thrips

Eupathithrips is a genus of thrips in the family Phlaeothripidae.

== Species ==
- Eupathithrips affinis
- Eupathithrips atripes
- Eupathithrips dentipes
- Eupathithrips meizon
- Eupathithrips panscopus
- Eupathithrips silvestrii
