= Ocythrips =

Scientific classification
- Kingdom: Animalia
- Phylum: Arthropoda
- Class: Insecta
- Order: Thysanoptera
- Family: Phlaeothripidae
- Genus: Ocythrips; Ananthakrishnan, 1972

Genus of thrips

Ocythrips is a genus of thrips in the family Phlaeothripidae.

== Species ==
- Ocythrips rarus
