= Maxillithrips =

Scientific classification
- Kingdom: Animalia
- Phylum: Arthropoda
- Class: Insecta
- Order: Thysanoptera
- Family: Phlaeothripidae
- Genus: Maxillithrips; Bhatti, 1978

Genus of thrips

Maxillithrips is a genus of thrips in the family Phlaeothripidae.

== Species ==
- Maxillithrips arorai
