= Apterygothrips =

Scientific classification
- Kingdom: Animalia
- Phylum: Arthropoda
- Class: Insecta
- Order: Thysanoptera
- Family: Phlaeothripidae
- Genus: Apterygothrips; Priesner, 1933

Genus of thrips

Apterygothrips is a genus of thrips in the family Phlaeothripidae.

== Species ==
- Apterygothrips australis
- Apterygothrips banyan
- Apterygothrips bicolor
- Apterygothrips bournieri
- Apterygothrips brunneicornis
- Apterygothrips canarius
- Apterygothrips caricis
- Apterygothrips dempax
- Apterygothrips flavus
- Apterygothrips floridensis
- Apterygothrips fungosus
- Apterygothrips fuscus
- Apterygothrips gilvipes
- Apterygothrips grassoi
- Apterygothrips haloxyli
- Apterygothrips hispanicus
- Apterygothrips jenseri
- Apterygothrips jogensis
- Apterygothrips kohai
- Apterygothrips longiceps
- Apterygothrips nakaharai
- Apterygothrips neovulcaniensis
- Apterygothrips okajimai
- Apterygothrips pellucidus
- Apterygothrips perplexus
- Apterygothrips piceatus
- Apterygothrips pinicolus
- Apterygothrips pitkini
- Apterygothrips politus
- Apterygothrips priesneri
- Apterygothrips remotus
- Apterygothrips robustus
- Apterygothrips rubiginosus
- Apterygothrips semiflavus
- Apterygothrips sparsus
- Apterygothrips vesmanisae
- Apterygothrips viretum
- Apterygothrips wollastoni
- Apterygothrips zelkovae
- Apterygothrips zempoalensis
