= Stephanothrips =

Scientific classification
- Kingdom: Animalia
- Phylum: Arthropoda
- Class: Insecta
- Order: Thysanoptera
- Family: Phlaeothripidae
- Genus: Stephanothrips; Trybom, 1913

Genus of thrips

Stephanothrips is a genus of thrips in the family Phlaeothripidae.

== Species ==
- Stephanothrips adnatus
- Stephanothrips albicollis
- Stephanothrips austrinus
- Stephanothrips barretti
- Stephanothrips boninensis
- Stephanothrips bradleyi
- Stephanothrips breviceps
- Stephanothrips broomei
- Stephanothrips buffai
- Stephanothrips carolinus
- Stephanothrips corticinus
- Stephanothrips ferrari
- Stephanothrips formosanus
- Stephanothrips fusiantennatus
- Stephanothrips howei
- Stephanothrips japonicus
- Stephanothrips kentingensis
- Stephanothrips leucocephalus
- Stephanothrips loricatus
- Stephanothrips malayensis
- Stephanothrips metaleucus
- Stephanothrips miscanthi
- Stephanothrips occidentalis
- Stephanothrips shikokuensis
- Stephanothrips takagii
- Stephanothrips thai
- Stephanothrips torajanus
- Stephanothrips toshifumii
- Stephanothrips uvarovi
- Stephanothrips whitcombi
- Stephanothrips yaeyamensis
- Stephanothrips zonatus
