= Dolicholepta =

Scientific classification
- Kingdom: Animalia
- Phylum: Arthropoda
- Class: Insecta
- Order: Thysanoptera
- Family: Phlaeothripidae
- Genus: Dolicholepta; Priesner, 1932

Genus of thrips

Dolicholepta is a genus of thrips in the family Phlaeothripidae.

== Species ==
- Dolicholepta brevituba
- Dolicholepta flaviantennatus
- Dolicholepta ghesquierei
- Dolicholepta gutierrezi
- Dolicholepta inquilinus
- Dolicholepta jeanneli
- Dolicholepta karnyi
- Dolicholepta micrura
- Dolicholepta nigripes
- Dolicholepta proximius
- Dolicholepta scotti
