= Phiarothrips =

Scientific classification
- Kingdom: Animalia
- Phylum: Arthropoda
- Class: Insecta
- Order: Thysanoptera
- Family: Phlaeothripidae
- Genus: Phiarothrips; Ananthakrishnan, 1968

Genus of thrips

Phiarothrips is a genus of thrips in the family Phlaeothripidae.

== Species ==
- Phiarothrips reperticus
