= Thaumatothrips =

Scientific classification
- Kingdom: Animalia
- Phylum: Arthropoda
- Class: Insecta
- Order: Thysanoptera
- Family: Phlaeothripidae
- Genus: Thaumatothrips; Karny, 1922

Genus of thrips

Thaumatothrips is a genus of thrips in the family Phlaeothripidae.

== Species ==
- Thaumatothrips froggatti
