= Weitschatithrips =

Weitschatithrips Temporal range: 37.2–33.9 Ma Eocene

Scientific classification
- Kingdom: Animalia
- Phylum: Arthropoda
- Class: Insecta
- Order: Thysanoptera
- Family: Phlaeothripidae
- Genus: †Weitschatithrips; Schliephake 2003

Genus of thrips

Weitschatithrips was a genus of thrips in the family Phlaeothripidae.

Fossils are only found in Baltic amber, (GPIH collection).

== Species ==
- †Weitschatithrips apithanus
