= Kellyia =

Scientific classification
- Kingdom: Animalia
- Phylum: Arthropoda
- Class: Insecta
- Order: Thysanoptera
- Family: Phlaeothripidae
- Genus: Kellyia; Bagnall, 1929

Genus of thrips

Kellyia is a genus of thrips in the family Phlaeothripidae.

== Species ==
- Kellyia bagnalli
- Kellyia biadenes
- Kellyia froggatti
- Kellyia giraulti
- Kellyia hoodianus
- Kellyia karnyi
- Kellyia milmani
- Kellyia moultoni
- Kellyia palmerae
- Kellyia pitkini
- Kellyia priesneri
- Kellyia stannardi
- Kellyia wilsoni
