= Isotrichothrips =

Scientific classification
- Kingdom: Animalia
- Phylum: Arthropoda
- Class: Insecta
- Order: Thysanoptera
- Family: Phlaeothripidae
- Genus: Isotrichothrips; Priesner, 1968

Genus of thrips

Isotrichothrips is a genus of thrips in the family Phlaeothripidae.

== Species ==
- Isotrichothrips consanguineus
- Isotrichothrips longirostris
