= Lispothrips =

Scientific classification
- Kingdom: Animalia
- Phylum: Arthropoda
- Class: Insecta
- Order: Thysanoptera
- Family: Phlaeothripidae
- Genus: Lispothrips; Reuter, 1899

Genus of thrips

Lispothrips is a genus of thrips in the family Phlaeothripidae.

== Species ==
- Lispothrips birdi
- Lispothrips brevicruralis
- Lispothrips crassipes
- Lispothrips populi
- Lispothrips salicarius
- Lispothrips wasastjernae
