= Alerothrips =

Scientific classification
- Kingdom: Animalia
- Phylum: Arthropoda
- Class: Insecta
- Order: Thysanoptera
- Family: Phlaeothripidae
- Genus: Alerothrips; Bhatti, 1995

Genus of thrips

Alerothrips is a genus of thrips in the family Phlaeothripidae. The genus has an Asian distribution, with one species known from India and two from Thailand.

== Species ==
- Alerothrips banpoti
- Alerothrips indicus
- Alerothrips thailandicus
