= Euryaplothrips =

Scientific classification
- Kingdom: Animalia
- Phylum: Arthropoda
- Class: Insecta
- Order: Thysanoptera
- Family: Phlaeothripidae
- Genus: Euryaplothrips; Ramakrishna & Margabandhu, 1931

Genus of thrips

Euryaplothrips is a genus of thrips in the family Phlaeothripidae.

== Species ==
- Euryaplothrips crassus
