= Majerthrips =

Scientific classification
- Kingdom: Animalia
- Phylum: Arthropoda
- Class: Insecta
- Order: Thysanoptera
- Family: Phlaeothripidae
- Genus: Majerthrips; Mound & Minaei, 2006
- Species: M. barrowi

Binomial name
- Majerthrips barrowi Mound & Minaei, 2006

Genus of thrips

Majerthrips is a monotypic genus of thrips in the family Phlaeothripidae. The only species is Majerthrips barrowi.
