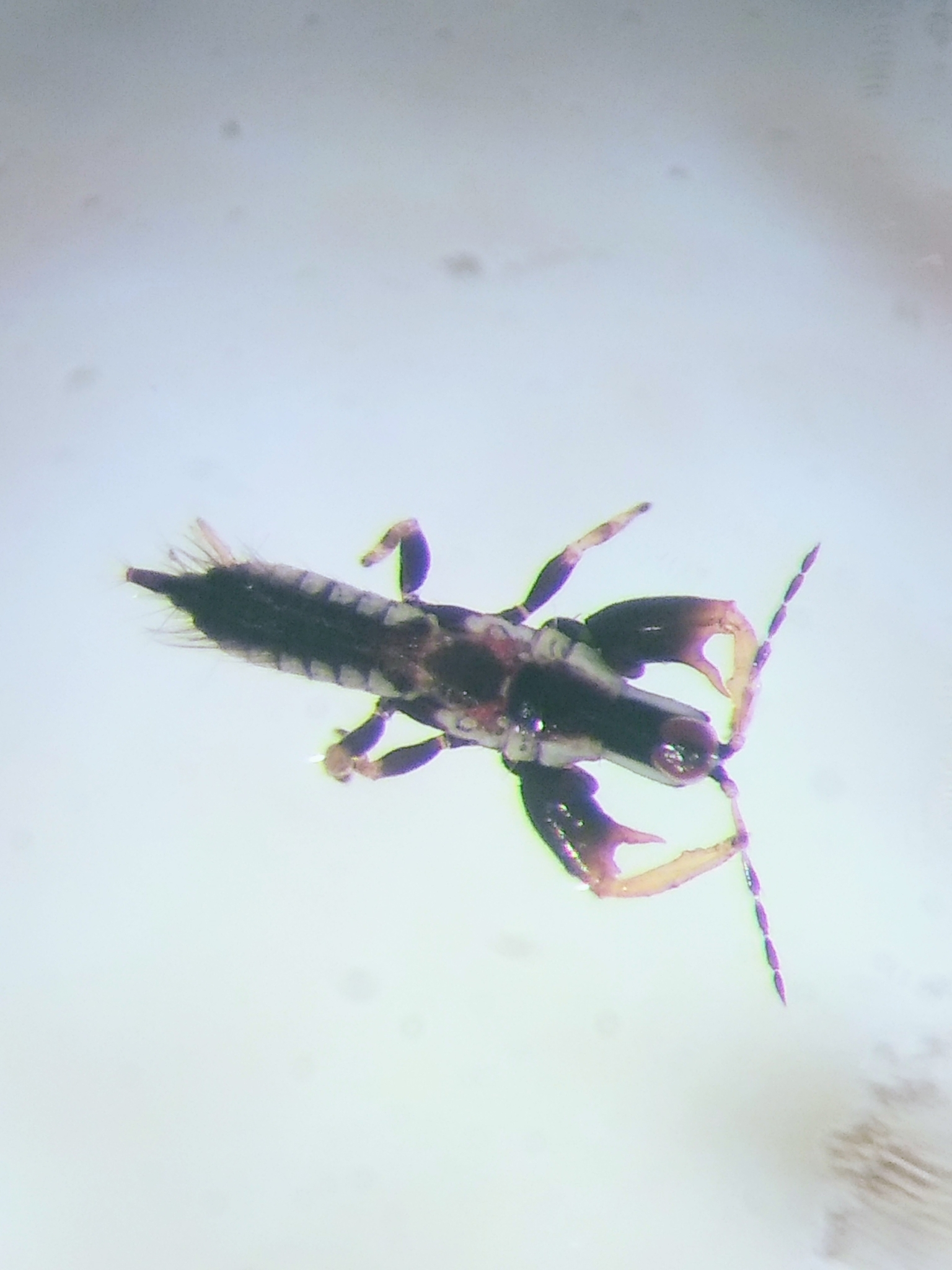
- Macrophthalmothrips argus

Scientific classification
- Kingdom: Animalia
- Phylum: Arthropoda
- Class: Insecta
- Order: Thysanoptera
- Family: Phlaeothripidae
- Genus: Macrophthalmothrips; Karny, 1920

= Macrophthalmothrips =

Genus of thrips

Macrophthalmothrips is a genus of thrips in the family Phlaeothripidae.

== Species ==
- Macrophthalmothrips allops
- Macrophthalmothrips argus
- Macrophthalmothrips diasi
- Macrophthalmothrips femoralis
- Macrophthalmothrips flavafemora
- Macrophthalmothrips gracilis
- Macrophthalmothrips heinzei
- Macrophthalmothrips helenae
- Macrophthalmothrips hemipteroides
- Macrophthalmothrips kiesteri
- Macrophthalmothrips neocaledonensis
- Macrophthalmothrips pacholatkoi
- Macrophthalmothrips quadricolor
- Macrophthalmothrips splendidus
- Macrophthalmothrips usingeri
- Macrophthalmothrips williamsi
