= Crotonothrips =

Scientific classification
- Kingdom: Animalia
- Phylum: Arthropoda
- Class: Insecta
- Order: Thysanoptera
- Family: Phlaeothripidae
- Genus: Crotonothrips; Ananthakrishnan, 1968

Genus of thrips

Crotonothrips is a genus of thrips in the family Phlaeothripidae.

== Species ==
- Crotonothrips cacharensis
- Crotonothrips coorgensis
- Crotonothrips dantahasta
- Crotonothrips davidi
- Crotonothrips dentifer
- Crotonothrips dissimilis
- Crotonothrips erraticus
- Crotonothrips gallarum
- Crotonothrips longirostris
- Crotonothrips maoensis
- Crotonothrips memecylonicus
- Crotonothrips mimicus
- Crotonothrips nagaensis
- Crotonothrips nelliampathiensis
- Crotonothrips parvus
- Crotonothrips polyalthiae
