= Metriothrips =

Scientific classification
- Kingdom: Animalia
- Phylum: Arthropoda
- Class: Insecta
- Order: Thysanoptera
- Family: Phlaeothripidae
- Genus: Metriothrips; Hood, 1936

Genus of thrips

Metriothrips is a genus of thrips in the family Phlaeothripidae.

== Species ==
- Metriothrips angusticapitis
- Metriothrips bournieri
- Metriothrips mayri
- Metriothrips midas
- Metriothrips secundus
- Metriothrips tzararacuaensis
