= Tylothrips =

Scientific classification
- Kingdom: Animalia
- Phylum: Arthropoda
- Class: Insecta
- Order: Thysanoptera
- Family: Phlaeothripidae
- Genus: Tylothrips; Hood, 1937

Genus of thrips

Tylothrips is a genus of thrips in the family Phlaeothripidae.

== Species ==
- Tylothrips achaetus
- Tylothrips brasiliensis
- Tylothrips caelatoris
- Tylothrips clavivestis
- Tylothrips cochlearius
- Tylothrips concolor
- Tylothrips consobrinus
- Tylothrips crassus
- Tylothrips flaviventris
- Tylothrips forticauda
- Tylothrips fulvescens
- Tylothrips fuscifrons
- Tylothrips gracilis
- Tylothrips indicus
- Tylothrips inuncatus
- Tylothrips longulus
- Tylothrips majusculus
- Tylothrips minor
- Tylothrips osborni
- Tylothrips paulus
- Tylothrips samirseni
- Tylothrips striaticeps
- Tylothrips subglaber
- Tylothrips ustulatus
