= Pseudophilothrips =

Scientific classification
- Kingdom: Animalia
- Phylum: Arthropoda
- Class: Insecta
- Order: Thysanoptera
- Family: Phlaeothripidae
- Genus: Pseudophilothrips; Johansen, 1979

Genus of thrips

Pseudophilothrips is a genus of thrips in the family Phlaeothripidae.

== Species ==
- Pseudophilothrips adisi
- Pseudophilothrips amabilis
- Pseudophilothrips avocadis
- Pseudophilothrips didymopanicis
- Pseudophilothrips fugitivus
- Pseudophilothrips gandolfoi
- Pseudophilothrips ichini
- Pseudophilothrips moundi
- Pseudophilothrips obscuricornis
- Pseudophilothrips perseae
- Pseudophilothrips retanai
- Pseudophilothrips seticollis
- Pseudophilothrips varicornis
