= Bagnalliella =

Scientific classification
- Kingdom: Animalia
- Phylum: Arthropoda
- Class: Insecta
- Order: Thysanoptera
- Family: Phlaeothripidae
- Genus: Bagnalliella; Karny, 1920

Genus of thrips

Bagnalliella is a genus of thrips in the family Phlaeothripidae.

== Species ==
- Bagnalliella arizonae
- Bagnalliella australis
- Bagnalliella desertae
- Bagnalliella flavipes
- Bagnalliella glaucae
- Bagnalliella huachucae
- Bagnalliella mojave
- Bagnalliella robusta
- Bagnalliella yuccae
