= Sartrithrips =

Scientific classification
- Kingdom: Animalia
- Phylum: Arthropoda
- Class: Insecta
- Order: Thysanoptera
- Family: Phlaeothripidae
- Genus: Sartrithrips; Mound & Morris, 2001

Genus of thrips

Sartrithrips is a genus of thrips in the family Phlaeothripidae.

== Species ==
- Sartrithrips areius
- Sartrithrips bapto
- Sartrithrips luctator
- Sartrithrips mars
- Sartrithrips popinator
- Sartrithrips pyctus
- Sartrithrips vesper
