= Senegathrips =

Scientific classification
- Kingdom: Animalia
- Phylum: Arthropoda
- Class: Insecta
- Order: Thysanoptera
- Family: Phlaeothripidae
- Genus: Senegathrips; Bournier, 1971

Genus of thrips

Senegathrips is a genus of thrips in the family Phlaeothripidae.

== Species ==
- Senegathrips coutini
