= Tolmetothrips =

Scientific classification
- Kingdom: Animalia
- Phylum: Arthropoda
- Class: Insecta
- Order: Thysanoptera
- Family: Phlaeothripidae
- Genus: Tolmetothrips; Priesner, 1953

Genus of thrips

Tolmetothrips is a genus of Thrips in the family Phlaeothripidae.

== Species ==
- Tolmetothrips granti
- Tolmetothrips smilacis
