= Rhinoceps =

Scientific classification
- Kingdom: Animalia
- Phylum: Arthropoda
- Class: Insecta
- Order: Thysanoptera
- Family: Phlaeothripidae
- Genus: Rhinoceps; Faure, 1949

Genus of thrips

Rhinoceps is a genus of thrips in the family Phlaeothripidae.

== Species ==
- Rhinoceps flavipes
- Rhinoceps jansei
- Rhinoceps tapanti
