= Spilothrips =

Scientific classification
- Kingdom: Animalia
- Phylum: Arthropoda
- Class: Insecta
- Order: Thysanoptera
- Family: Phlaeothripidae
- Genus: Spilothrips; Moulton, 1942

Genus of thrips

Spilothrips is a genus of thrips in the family Phlaeothripidae.

== Species ==
- Spilothrips varicolor
