= Lizalothrips =

Scientific classification
- Kingdom: Animalia
- Phylum: Arthropoda
- Class: Insecta
- Order: Thysanoptera
- Family: Phlaeothripidae
- Genus: Lizalothrips; Okajima, 1984

Genus of thrips

Lizalothrips is a genus of thrips in the family Phlaeothripidae.

== Species ==
- Lizalothrips borneoensis
- Lizalothrips luzonensis
