= Orthothrips =

Scientific classification
- Kingdom: Animalia
- Phylum: Arthropoda
- Class: Insecta
- Order: Thysanoptera
- Family: Phlaeothripidae
- Genus: Orthothrips; Priesner, 1925

Genus of thrips

Orthothrips is a genus of thrips in the family Phlaeothripidae.

== Species ==
- Orthothrips angustus
- Orthothrips bilineatus
- Orthothrips boneti
- Orthothrips caudatus
- Orthothrips dubius
- Orthothrips exilis
- Orthothrips leptura
- Orthothrips stylifer
- Orthothrips tepoztlanensis
- Orthothrips woytkowski
