= Azaleothrips =

Scientific classification
- Kingdom: Animalia
- Phylum: Arthropoda
- Class: Insecta
- Order: Thysanoptera
- Family: Phlaeothripidae
- Genus: Azaleothrips; Ananthakrishnan, 1964

Genus of thrips

Azaleothrips is a genus of thrips in the family Phlaeothripidae.

== Species ==
- Azaleothrips amabilis
- Azaleothrips apoensis
- Azaleothrips aspersus
- Azaleothrips atayal
- Azaleothrips bali
- Azaleothrips bhattii
- Azaleothrips bifidius
- Azaleothrips bulelengi
- Azaleothrips dentatus
- Azaleothrips dorsalis
- Azaleothrips flavicollis
- Azaleothrips floresi
- Azaleothrips formosae
- Azaleothrips indonesiensis
- Azaleothrips inflavus
- Azaleothrips laevigatus
- Azaleothrips laocai
- Azaleothrips lepidus
- Azaleothrips lineus
- Azaleothrips lixinae
- Azaleothrips luzonicus
- Azaleothrips magnus
- Azaleothrips malaya
- Azaleothrips mindanaoensis
- Azaleothrips moundi
- Azaleothrips perniger
- Azaleothrips philippinensis
- Azaleothrips phuketanus
- Azaleothrips pulcher
- Azaleothrips reticulatus
- Azaleothrips richardi
- Azaleothrips siamensis
- Azaleothrips simulans
- Azaleothrips sulawesicus
- Azaleothrips taiwanus
- Azaleothrips templeri
- Azaleothrips toshifumii
- Azaleothrips vietnamensis
