= Ecacanthothrips =

Scientific classification
- Kingdom: Animalia
- Phylum: Arthropoda
- Class: Insecta
- Order: Thysanoptera
- Family: Phlaeothripidae
- Genus: Ecacanthothrips; Bagnall, 1909

Genus of thrips

Ecacanthothrips is a genus of thrips in the family Phlaeothripidae.

== Species ==
- Ecacanthothrips andrei
- Ecacanthothrips claricornis
- Ecacanthothrips coniger
- Ecacanthothrips inarmatus
- Ecacanthothrips kolibaci
- Ecacanthothrips leai
- Ecacanthothrips moundi
- Ecacanthothrips nigellus
- Ecacanthothrips spinipes
- Ecacanthothrips tenuicornis
- Ecacanthothrips tibialis
