= Ramakrishnaiella =

Scientific classification
- Kingdom: Animalia
- Phylum: Arthropoda
- Class: Insecta
- Order: Thysanoptera
- Family: Phlaeothripidae
- Genus: Ramakrishnaiella; Karny, 1926

Genus of thrips

Ramakrishnaiella is a genus of thrips in the family Phlaeothripidae.

== Species ==
- Ramakrishnaiella nirmalapaksha
- Ramakrishnaiella unispina
