= Stomothrips =

Scientific classification
- Kingdom: Animalia
- Phylum: Arthropoda
- Class: Insecta
- Order: Thysanoptera
- Family: Phlaeothripidae
- Genus: Stomothrips; Okajima, 2000

Genus of thrips

Stomothrips is a genus of thrips in the family Phlaeothripidae.

== Species ==
- Stomothrips cycasi
- Stomothrips mouldeni
