= Agynaikothrips =

Scientific classification
- Kingdom: Animalia
- Phylum: Arthropoda
- Class: Insecta
- Order: Thysanoptera
- Family: Phlaeothripidae
- Genus: Agynaikothrips; Okajima, 2006

Genus of thrips

Agynaikothrips is a genus of thrips in the family Phlaeothripidae. It occurs in Asia, with one species known from Japan and the other from Taiwan.

== Species ==
- Agynaikothrips okinawaensis
- Agynaikothrips venapennis
