= Zaliothrips =

Scientific classification
- Kingdom: Animalia
- Phylum: Arthropoda
- Class: Insecta
- Order: Thysanoptera
- Family: Phlaeothripidae
- Genus: Zaliothrips; Hood, 1938

Genus of thrips

Zaliothrips is a genus of thrips in the family Phlaeothripidae.

== Species ==
- Zaliothrips abdominalis
- Zaliothrips citripes
- Zaliothrips imitator
- Zaliothrips longisetosus
- Zaliothrips luteolus
- Zaliothrips nigripes
