= Heptadikothrips =

Scientific classification
- Kingdom: Animalia
- Phylum: Arthropoda
- Class: Insecta
- Order: Thysanoptera
- Family: Phlaeothripidae
- Genus: Heptadikothrips; Crespi, Morris & Mound, 2004

Genus of thrips

Heptadikothrips is a genus of thrips in the family Phlaeothripidae.

== Species ==
- Heptadikothrips thallus
