= Bamboosiella =

Scientific classification
- Kingdom: Animalia
- Phylum: Arthropoda
- Class: Insecta
- Order: Thysanoptera
- Family: Phlaeothripidae
- Genus: Bamboosiella; Ananthakrishnan, 1957

Genus of thrips

Bamboosiella is a genus of thrips in the family Phlaeothripidae.

== Species ==
- Bamboosiella antennatus
- Bamboosiella australis
- Bamboosiella bicoloripes
- Bamboosiella brevis
- Bamboosiella cingulata
- Bamboosiella elongata
- Bamboosiella exastis
- Bamboosiella fasciata
- Bamboosiella flavescens
- Bamboosiella fusca
- Bamboosiella graminella
- Bamboosiella hartwigi
- Bamboosiella lewisi
- Bamboosiella longiosanum
- Bamboosiella longirostris
- Bamboosiella longisetis
- Bamboosiella magnus
- Bamboosiella malabarica
- Bamboosiella malaya
- Bamboosiella microptera
- Bamboosiella nayari
- Bamboosiella pitkini
- Bamboosiella repentina
- Bamboosiella sasa
- Bamboosiella semiflava
- Bamboosiella speciosus
- Bamboosiella stannardi
- Bamboosiella thailandica
- Bamboosiella varia
- Bamboosiella venkataramani
- Bamboosiella xiphophora
