= Ananthakrishnana =

Scientific classification
- Kingdom: Animalia
- Phylum: Arthropoda
- Class: Insecta
- Order: Thysanoptera
- Family: Phlaeothripidae
- Genus: Ananthakrishnana; Bhatti, 1967

Genus of thrips

Ananthakrishnana is a genus of thrips in the family Phlaeothripidae.

== Species ==
- Ananthakrishnana euphorbiae
