= Choleothrips =

Scientific classification
- Kingdom: Animalia
- Phylum: Arthropoda
- Class: Insecta
- Order: Thysanoptera
- Family: Phlaeothripidae
- Genus: Choleothrips; Moulton, 1927

Genus of thrips

Choleothrips is a genus of thrips in the family Phlaeothripidae. It is found in Australia in New South Wales and Queensland.

== Species ==
- Choleothrips geijerae
- Choleothrips percnus
