= Carathrips =

Scientific classification
- Kingdom: Animalia
- Phylum: Arthropoda
- Class: Insecta
- Order: Thysanoptera
- Family: Phlaeothripidae
- Genus: Carathrips; Hood, 1938

Genus of thrips

Carathrips is a genus of thrips in the family Phlaeothripidae.

== Species ==
- Carathrips ampliceps
- Carathrips bandeirantium
- Carathrips chamelaensis
- Carathrips delicatulus
- Carathrips ferrugineus
- Carathrips grandiceps
- Carathrips hemingi
- Carathrips impensus
- Carathrips interruptus
- Carathrips mediamericanus
- Carathrips pallidiventris
- Carathrips plaumanni
- Carathrips rufescens
- Carathrips sculpticollis
