= Tetracanthothrips =

Scientific classification
- Kingdom: Animalia
- Phylum: Arthropoda
- Class: Insecta
- Order: Thysanoptera
- Family: Phlaeothripidae
- Genus: Tetracanthothrips; Bagnall, 1915

Genus of thrips

Tetracanthothrips is a genus of thrips in the family Phlaeothripidae.

== Species ==
- Tetracanthothrips borneensis
