= Trichinothrips =

Scientific classification
- Kingdom: Animalia
- Phylum: Arthropoda
- Class: Insecta
- Order: Thysanoptera
- Family: Phlaeothripidae
- Genus: Trichinothrips; Bagnall, 1929

Genus of thrips

Trichinothrips is a genus of thrips in the family Phlaeothripidae.

== Species ==
- Trichinothrips breviceps
- Trichinothrips callipechys
- Trichinothrips fuscatus
- Trichinothrips latifrons
- Trichinothrips panamensis
- Trichinothrips pusillus
- Trichinothrips sensilis
- Trichinothrips strasseni
