= Pegothrips =

Scientific classification
- Kingdom: Animalia
- Phylum: Arthropoda
- Class: Insecta
- Order: Thysanoptera
- Family: Phlaeothripidae
- Genus: Pegothrips; Sen & Muraleedharan, 1977

Genus of thrips

Pegothrips is a genus of thrips in the family Phlaeothripidae.

== Species ==
- Pegothrips meghalaya
