= Callithrips =

Scientific classification
- Kingdom: Animalia
- Phylum: Arthropoda
- Class: Insecta
- Order: Thysanoptera
- Family: Phlaeothripidae
- Genus: Callithrips; ABournier, 1969

Genus of thrips

Callithrips is a genus of thrips in the family Phlaeothripidae.

== Species ==
- Callithrips bicolor
