= Crinitothrips =

Scientific classification
- Kingdom: Animalia
- Phylum: Arthropoda
- Class: Insecta
- Order: Thysanoptera
- Family: Phlaeothripidae
- Genus: Crinitothrips; Okajima, 1978

Genus of thrips

Crinitothrips is a genus of thrips in the family Phlaeothripidae.

== Species ==
- Crinitothrips amabilis
- Crinitothrips murphyi
- Crinitothrips roomi
- Crinitothrips setosus
- Crinitothrips spinulatus
