= Tragothrips =

Scientific classification
- Kingdom: Animalia
- Phylum: Arthropoda
- Class: Insecta
- Order: Thysanoptera
- Family: Phlaeothripidae
- Genus: Tragothrips; Pelikan, 2001

Genus of thrips

Tragothrips is a genus of thrips in the family Phlaeothripidae.

== Species ==
- Tragothrips kubani
