= Aiganothrips =

Scientific classification
- Kingdom: Animalia
- Phylum: Arthropoda
- Class: Insecta
- Order: Thysanoptera
- Family: Phlaeothripidae
- Genus: Aiganothrips; Bhatti, 1991

Genus of thrips

Aiganothrips is a genus of thrips in the family Phlaeothripidae.

== Species ==
- Aiganothrips hystrix
