= Eschatothrips =

Scientific classification
- Kingdom: Animalia
- Phylum: Arthropoda
- Class: Insecta
- Order: Thysanoptera
- Family: Phlaeothripidae
- Genus: Eschatothrips; Stannard, 1955

Genus of thrips

Eschatothrips is a genus of thrips in the family Phlaeothripidae.

== Species ==
- Eschatothrips barythripoides
- Eschatothrips cerinus
- Eschatothrips decoratus
- Eschatothrips pachyurus
- Eschatothrips reticulotubus
- Eschatothrips variegatus
- Eschatothrips whitcombi
