= Eurhynchothrips =

Scientific classification
- Kingdom: Animalia
- Phylum: Arthropoda
- Class: Insecta
- Order: Thysanoptera
- Family: Phlaeothripidae
- Genus: Eurhynchothrips; Bagnall, 1918

Genus of thrips

Eurhynchothrips is a genus of thrips in the family Phlaeothripidae.

== Species ==
- Eurhynchothrips bipunctatus
- Eurhynchothrips convergens
- Eurhynchothrips flavicornis
- Eurhynchothrips messuicola
- Eurhynchothrips ordinarius
