= Sakimurella =

Scientific classification
- Kingdom: Animalia
- Phylum: Arthropoda
- Class: Insecta
- Order: Thysanoptera
- Family: Phlaeothripidae
- Genus: Sakimurella; Bhatti, 1995

Genus of thrips

Sakimurella is a genus of thrips in the family Phlaeothripidae.

== Species ==
- Sakimurella kiriti
