= Schazothrips =

Scientific classification
- Kingdom: Animalia
- Phylum: Arthropoda
- Class: Insecta
- Order: Thysanoptera
- Family: Phlaeothripidae
- Genus: Schazothrips; Hood, 1957

Genus of thrips

Schazothrips is a genus of thrips in the family Phlaeothripidae.

== Species ==
- Schazothrips anadenus
