= Coryphothrips =

Scientific classification
- Kingdom: Animalia
- Phylum: Arthropoda
- Class: Insecta
- Order: Thysanoptera
- Family: Phlaeothripidae
- Genus: Coryphothrips; Karny, 1923

Genus of thrips

Coryphothrips is a genus of thrips in the family Phlaeothripidae.

== Species ==
- Coryphothrips coniceps
- Coryphothrips trochiceps
