= Hadothrips =

Scientific classification
- Kingdom: Animalia
- Phylum: Arthropoda
- Class: Insecta
- Order: Thysanoptera
- Family: Phlaeothripidae
- Genus: Hadothrips; Priesner, 1925

Genus of thrips

Hadothrips is a genus of thrips in the Phlaeothripidae.

== Species ==
- Hadothrips robiniae
