= Tetragonothrips =

Scientific classification
- Kingdom: Animalia
- Phylum: Arthropoda
- Class: Insecta
- Order: Thysanoptera
- Family: Phlaeothripidae
- Genus: Tetragonothrips; Moulton, 1940

Genus of thrips

Tetragonothrips is a genus of thrips in the family Phlaeothripidae.

== Species ==
- Tetragonothrips murmekiai
