= Psenothrips =

Scientific classification
- Kingdom: Animalia
- Phylum: Arthropoda
- Class: Insecta
- Order: Thysanoptera
- Family: Phlaeothripidae
- Genus: Psenothrips; Ananthakrishnan, 1968

Genus of thrips

Psenothrips is a genus of thrips in the family Phlaeothripidae.

== Species ==
- Psenothrips priesneri
