= Paracholeothrips =

Scientific classification
- Kingdom: Animalia
- Phylum: Arthropoda
- Class: Insecta
- Order: Thysanoptera
- Family: Phlaeothripidae
- Genus: Paracholeothrips; Moulton, 1968

Genus of thrips

Paracholeothrips is a genus of thrips in the family Phlaeothripidae.

== Species ==
- Paracholeothrips calcicolae
- Paracholeothrips clavisetae
- Paracholeothrips gracilis
- Paracholeothrips mulgae
- Paracholeothrips validus
