= Vicinothrips =

Scientific classification
- Kingdom: Animalia
- Phylum: Arthropoda
- Class: Insecta
- Order: Thysanoptera
- Family: Phlaeothripidae
- Genus: Vicinothrips (Mound & Morris, 2000)

Genus of thrips

Vicinothrips is a monotypic genus of thrips in the family Phlaeothripidae.

== Species ==
- Vicinothrips bullatus
