= Pentagonothrips =

Scientific classification
- Kingdom: Animalia
- Phylum: Arthropoda
- Class: Insecta
- Order: Thysanoptera
- Family: Phlaeothripidae
- Genus: Pentagonothrips; Haga & Okajima, 1979

Genus of thrips

Pentagonothrips is a genus of thrips in the family Phlaeothripidae.

== Species ==
- Pentagonothrips antennalis
