= Agrothrips =

Scientific classification
- Kingdom: Animalia
- Phylum: Arthropoda
- Class: Insecta
- Order: Thysanoptera
- Family: Phlaeothripidae
- Genus: Agrothrips; Jacot-Guillarmod, 1939

Genus of thrips

Agrothrips is a genus of thrips in the family Phlaeothripidae.

== Species ==
- Agrothrips arenicola
- Agrothrips dimidiatus
- Agrothrips omani
- Agrothrips pallidus
- Agrothrips priesneri
- Agrothrips tantillus
- Agrothrips tenebricosus
