= Tamilthrips =

Scientific classification
- Kingdom: Animalia
- Phylum: Arthropoda
- Class: Insecta
- Order: Thysanoptera
- Family: Phlaeothripidae
- Genus: Tamilthrips; Bhatti, 1995

Genus of thrips

Tamilthrips is a genus of thrips in the family Phlaeothripidae.

== Species ==
- Tamilthrips pini
