= Protolispothrips =

Scientific classification
- Kingdom: Animalia
- Phylum: Arthropoda
- Class: Insecta
- Order: Thysanoptera
- Family: Phlaeothripidae
- Genus: Protolispothrips; Schliephake, 2001

Genus of thrips

Protolispothrips is a genus of thrips in the family Phlaeothripidae.

== Species ==
- †Protolispothrips multisetiger
