= Phenothrips =

Scientific classification
- Kingdom: Animalia
- Phylum: Arthropoda
- Class: Insecta
- Order: Thysanoptera
- Family: Phlaeothripidae
- Genus: Phenothrips; Ananthakrishnan, 1967

Genus of thrips

Phenothrips is a genus of thrips in the family Phlaeothripidae.

== Species ==
- Phenothrips decoratus
