= Arrhenothrips =

Scientific classification
- Kingdom: Animalia
- Phylum: Arthropoda
- Class: Insecta
- Order: Thysanoptera
- Family: Phlaeothripidae
- Genus: Arrhenothrips; Hood, 1919

Genus of thrips

Arrhenothrips is a genus of thrips in the family Phlaeothripidae.

== Species ==
- Arrhenothrips acuminatus
- Arrhenothrips brevis
- Arrhenothrips dhumrapaksha
- Arrhenothrips longisetis
- Arrhenothrips marieps
- Arrhenothrips pauliani
- Arrhenothrips ramakrishnae
