= Mastigothrips =

Scientific classification
- Kingdom: Animalia
- Phylum: Arthropoda
- Class: Insecta
- Order: Thysanoptera
- Family: Phlaeothripidae
- Genus: Mastigothrips; Priesner, 1932

Genus of thrips

Mastigothrips is a genus of thrips in the family Phlaeothripidae.

== Species ==
- Mastigothrips fuscus
- Mastigothrips karnyianus
