= Sunaitiothrips =

Scientific classification
- Kingdom: Animalia
- Phylum: Arthropoda
- Class: Insecta
- Order: Thysanoptera
- Family: Phlaeothripidae
- Genus: Sunaitiothrips; Moulton, 1942
- Species: S. fuscus

Binomial name
- Sunaitiothrips fuscus Moulton, 1942

Synonyms
- (Genus): Sunaitothrips Moulton, 1942; (Species): Sunaitothrips fuscus Moulton, 1942

Genus of thrips

Sunaitiothrips is a genus of thrips in the family Phlaeothripidae. It is monotypic, being represented by the single species Sunaitiothrips fuscus.
