= Scelothrips =

Scientific classification
- Kingdom: Animalia
- Phylum: Arthropoda
- Class: Insecta
- Order: Thysanoptera
- Family: Phlaeothripidae
- Genus: Scelothrips; Priesner, 1952

Genus of thrips

Scelothrips is a genus of thrips in the family Phlaeothripidae.

== Species ==
- Scelothrips menoni
