= Matilethrips =

Scientific classification
- Kingdom: Animalia
- Phylum: Arthropoda
- Class: Insecta
- Order: Thysanoptera
- Family: Phlaeothripidae
- Genus: Matilethrips; Bournier & Bournier, 1979

Genus of thrips

Matilethrips is a genus of thrips in the family Phlaeothripidae.

== Species ==
- Matilethrips inermis
