= Symphyothrips =

Scientific classification
- Kingdom: Animalia
- Phylum: Arthropoda
- Class: Insecta
- Order: Thysanoptera
- Family: Phlaeothripidae
- Genus: Symphyothrips; Hood & Williams, 1915

Genus of thrips

Symphyothrips is a genus of thrips in the family Phlaeothripidae.

== Species ==
- Symphyothrips aberrans
- Symphyothrips alifanensis
- Symphyothrips caliginosus
- Symphyothrips concordiensis
- †Symphyothrips longicaudus
- Symphyothrips longicornis
- Symphyothrips punctatus
- Symphyothrips reticulatus
