= Gymnothrips =

Scientific classification
- Kingdom: Animalia
- Phylum: Arthropoda
- Class: Insecta
- Order: Thysanoptera
- Family: Phlaeothripidae
- Genus: Gymnothrips; Karny, 1911

Genus of thrips

Gymnothrips is a genus of thrips in the family Phlaeothripidae.

== Species ==
- Gymnothrips moultoni
