= Holopothrips =

Scientific classification
- Kingdom: Animalia
- Phylum: Arthropoda
- Class: Insecta
- Order: Thysanoptera
- Family: Phlaeothripidae
- Genus: Holopothrips; Hood, 1914

Genus of thrips

Holopothrips is a genus of thrips in the family Phlaeothripidae.

== Species ==
- Holopothrips acrioris
- Holopothrips affinis
- Holopothrips ananasi
- Holopothrips atlanticus
- Holopothrips balteatus
- Holopothrips bicolor
- Holopothrips brevicapitatum
- Holopothrips cardosoi
- Holopothrips carolinae
- Holopothrips chaconi
- Holopothrips claritibialis
- Holopothrips conducans
- Holopothrips curiosus
- Holopothrips elongatus
- Holopothrips erianthi
- Holopothrips ferrisi
- Holopothrips flavisetis
- Holopothrips fulvus
- Holopothrips graminis
- Holopothrips graziae
- Holopothrips hambletoni
- Holopothrips hilaris
- Holopothrips inconspicuus
- Holopothrips infestans
- Holopothrips inquilinus
- Holopothrips inversus
- Holopothrips irregularis
- Holopothrips jaboticabae
- Holopothrips johanseni
- Holopothrips kaminskii
- Holopothrips longihamus
- Holopothrips longisetus
- Holopothrips magnus
- Holopothrips maiae
- Holopothrips mariae
- Holopothrips molzi
- Holopothrips nigrisetis
- Holopothrips nigrum
- Holopothrips oaxacensis
- Holopothrips omercooperi
- Holopothrips orites
- Holopothrips paulus
- Holopothrips pennatus
- Holopothrips permagnus
- Holopothrips pictus
- Holopothrips porrosati
- Holopothrips punctatus
- Holopothrips reticulatus
- Holopothrips seini
- Holopothrips signatus
- Holopothrips singularis
- Holopothrips spermathecus
- Holopothrips stannardi
- Holopothrips striatus
- Holopothrips tabebuia
- Holopothrips tenuis
- Holopothrips tillandsiae
- Holopothrips tupi
- Holopothrips urinator
- Holopothrips varicolor
