= Brachythrips =

Scientific classification
- Kingdom: Animalia
- Phylum: Arthropoda
- Class: Insecta
- Order: Thysanoptera
- Family: Phlaeothripidae
- Genus: Brachythrips; Reuter, 1899

Genus of thrips

Brachythrips is a genus of thrips in the family Phlaeothripidae.

== Species ==
- Brachythrips dirghavadana
- Brachythrips flavicornis
