= Asemothrips =

Scientific classification
- Kingdom: Animalia
- Phylum: Arthropoda
- Class: Insecta
- Order: Thysanoptera
- Family: Phlaeothripidae
- Genus: Asemothrips; Hood, 1919

Genus of thrips

Asemothrips is a genus of thrips in the family Phlaeothripidae.

== Species ==
- Asemothrips combustipes
- Asemothrips fallax
- Asemothrips finlayi
- Asemothrips pallipes
- Asemothrips picturatus
