= Margaritothrips =

Scientific classification
- Kingdom: Animalia
- Phylum: Arthropoda
- Class: Insecta
- Order: Thysanoptera
- Family: Phlaeothripidae
- Genus: Margaritothrips; Priesner, 1932

Genus of thrips

Margaritothrips is a genus of thrips in the family Phlaeothripidae.

== Species ==
- Margaritothrips flavus
- Margaritothrips longus
- Margaritothrips sumatrensis
