= Pedoeothrips =

Scientific classification
- Kingdom: Animalia
- Phylum: Arthropoda
- Class: Insecta
- Order: Thysanoptera
- Family: Phlaeothripidae
- Genus: Pedoeothrips; Hood, 1954

Genus of thrips

Pedoeothrips is a genus of thrips in the family Phlaeothripidae.

== Species ==
- Pedoeothrips nigritus
