= Tropothrips =

Scientific classification
- Kingdom: Animalia
- Phylum: Arthropoda
- Class: Insecta
- Order: Thysanoptera
- Family: Phlaeothripidae
- Genus: Tropothrips; Hood, 1949

Genus of thrips

Tropothrips is a genus of thrips in the family Phlaeothripidae.

== Species ==
- Tropothrips borgmeieri
- Tropothrips dampfi
- Tropothrips nigripes
- Tropothrips richardsi
- Tropothrips tuxtlae
