= Glenothrips =

Scientific classification
- Kingdom: Animalia
- Phylum: Arthropoda
- Class: Insecta
- Order: Thysanoptera
- Family: Phlaeothripidae
- Genus: Glenothrips; Priesner, 1921

Genus of thrips

Glenothrips is a genus of thrips in the family Phlaeothripidae.

== Species ==
- Glenothrips biuncinatus
