= Sedulothrips =

Scientific classification
- Kingdom: Animalia
- Phylum: Arthropoda
- Class: Insecta
- Order: Thysanoptera
- Family: Phlaeothripidae
- Genus: Sedulothrips; Bagnall, 1915

Genus of thrips

Sedulothrips is a genus of thrips in the family Phlaeothripidae.

== Species ==
- Sedulothrips tristis
- Sedulothrips vigilans
