= Urothrips =

Scientific classification
- Kingdom: Animalia
- Phylum: Arthropoda
- Class: Insecta
- Order: Thysanoptera
- Family: Phlaeothripidae
- Genus: Urothrips; Bagnall, 1909

Genus of thrips

Urothrips is a genus of thrips in the family Phlaeothripidae.

== Species ==
- Urothrips bagnalli
- Urothrips calvus
- Urothrips gibberosa
- Urothrips junctus
- Urothrips kobroi
- Urothrips lancangensis
- Urothrips minor
- Urothrips paradoxus
- Urothrips reedi
- Urothrips reticulatus
- Urothrips tarai
