= Eurytrichothrips =

Scientific classification
- Kingdom: Animalia
- Phylum: Arthropoda
- Class: Insecta
- Order: Thysanoptera
- Family: Phlaeothripidae
- Genus: Eurytrichothrips; Priesner, 1920

Genus of thrips

Eurytrichothrips is a genus of thrips in the family Phlaeothripidae.

== Species ==
- Eurytrichothrips affinis
