= Liotrichothrips =

Scientific classification
- Kingdom: Animalia
- Phylum: Arthropoda
- Class: Insecta
- Order: Thysanoptera
- Family: Phlaeothripidae
- Genus: †Liotrichothrips; Bagnall, 1929

Extinct genus of thrips

Liotrichothrips is a fossil genus of thrips in the family Phlaeothripidae.

== Species ==
- †Liotrichothrips antiquus
- †Liotrichothrips discrepans
- †Liotrichothrips hystrix
- †Liotrichothrips minor
