= Halothrips =

Scientific classification
- Kingdom: Animalia
- Phylum: Arthropoda
- Class: Insecta
- Order: Thysanoptera
- Family: Phlaeothripidae
- Genus: Halothrips; Bournier, 1962

Genus of thrips

Halothrips is a genus of thrips in the family Phlaeothripidae.

== Species ==
- Halothrips salicorniae
