= Asianthrips =

Scientific classification
- Kingdom: Animalia
- Phylum: Arthropoda
- Class: Insecta
- Order: Thysanoptera
- Family: Phlaeothripidae
- Genus: Asianthrips; Okajima, 2006

Genus of thrips

Asianthrips is a genus of thrips in the family Phlaeothripidae.

== Species ==
- Asianthrips orientalis
