= Strepterothrips =

Scientific classification
- Kingdom: Animalia
- Phylum: Arthropoda
- Class: Insecta
- Order: Thysanoptera
- Family: Phlaeothripidae
- Genus: Strepterothrips; Hood, 1934

Genus of thrips

Strepterothrips is a genus of thrips in the family Phlaeothripidae.

== Species ==
- Strepterothrips africanus
- Strepterothrips apterus
- Strepterothrips arake
- Strepterothrips barbatus
- Strepterothrips biconus
- Strepterothrips brasilianus
- Strepterothrips conradi
- Strepterothrips floridanus
- Strepterothrips moffati
- Strepterothrips okajimai
- Strepterothrips orientalis
- Strepterothrips parvulus
- Strepterothrips tuberculatus
- Strepterothrips uenoi
- Strepterothrips verruculus
