= Amphibolothrips =

Scientific classification
- Kingdom: Animalia
- Phylum: Arthropoda
- Class: Insecta
- Order: Thysanoptera
- Family: Phlaeothripidae
- Genus: Amphibolothrips; Buffa, 1909

Genus of thrips

Amphibolothrips is a genus of thrips in the family Phlaeothripidae.

== Species ==
- Amphibolothrips grassii
- Amphibolothrips knechteli
- Amphibolothrips marginatus
