= Acanthothrips =

Scientific classification
- Kingdom: Animalia
- Phylum: Arthropoda
- Class: Insecta
- Order: Thysanoptera
- Family: Phlaeothripidae
- Genus: Acanthothrips; Uzel, 1895

Genus of thrips

Acanthothrips is a genus of thrips in the family Phlaeothripidae. The majority of species in the genus occur in the New World. One species has a holarctic distribution and another species is limited to northern Europe.

== Species ==
- Acanthothrips albivittatus
- Acanthothrips albovittatus
- Acanthothrips amoenus
- Acanthothrips argentifer
- Acanthothrips candidus
- Acanthothrips folsomi
- Acanthothrips grandis
- Acanthothrips itzanus
- Acanthothrips nodicornis
- Acanthothrips palmi
- Acanthothrips perileucus
- Acanthothrips priesneri
- Acanthothrips vittatus
