= Priesneria =

Scientific classification
- Kingdom: Animalia
- Phylum: Arthropoda
- Class: Insecta
- Order: Thysanoptera
- Family: Phlaeothripidae
- Genus: Priesneria; Bagnall, 1926

Genus of thrips

Priesneria is a genus of thrips in the family Phlaeothripidae.

== Species ==
- Priesneria akestra
- Priesneria doliicornis
- Priesneria insolitus
- Priesneria kellyana
- Priesneria longistylosa
- Priesneria peronis
