= Eugynothrips =

Scientific classification
- Kingdom: Animalia
- Phylum: Arthropoda
- Class: Insecta
- Order: Thysanoptera
- Family: Phlaeothripidae
- Genus: Eugynothrips; Priesner, 1926

Genus of thrips

Eugynothrips is a genus of thrips in the family Phlaeothripidae.

== Species ==
- Eugynothrips adulator
- Eugynothrips brevisetis
- Eugynothrips coarctatus
- Eugynothrips conocephali
- Eugynothrips convolvens
- Eugynothrips decipiens
- Eugynothrips intorquens
- Eugynothrips manubrialis
- Eugynothrips pachypus
- Eugynothrips persimilis
- Eugynothrips priesneri
- Eugynothrips seticornis
- Eugynothrips sumatranus
- Eugynothrips susicola
- Eugynothrips tubifex
- Eugynothrips umbricornis
