= Rhopalothripoides =

Scientific classification
- Kingdom: Animalia
- Phylum: Arthropoda
- Class: Insecta
- Order: Thysanoptera
- Family: Phlaeothripidae
- Genus: Rhopalothripoides; Bagnall, 1929

Genus of thrips

Rhopalothripoides is a genus of thrips in the family Phlaeothripidae.

== Species ==
- Rhopalothripoides colus
- Rhopalothripoides disbamatus
- Rhopalothripoides froggatti
- Rhopalothripoides luteus
- Rhopalothripoides pickardii
- Rhopalothripoides victoriae
