= Karnyothrips =

Scientific classification
- Kingdom: Animalia
- Phylum: Arthropoda
- Class: Insecta
- Order: Thysanoptera
- Family: Phlaeothripidae
- Genus: Karnyothrips; Watson, 1923

Genus of thrips

Karnyothrips is a genus of thrips in the family Phlaeothripidae.

== Species ==
- Karnyothrips acer
- Karnyothrips alpha
- Karnyothrips americanus
- Karnyothrips antennalis
- Karnyothrips antennatus
- Karnyothrips anthracinus
- Karnyothrips arizona
- Karnyothrips ateuchis
- Karnyothrips brimleyi
- Karnyothrips bromelianus
- Karnyothrips caliginosus
- Karnyothrips cameroni
- Karnyothrips caxamarca
- Karnyothrips cyathomorphus
- Karnyothrips dodgei
- Karnyothrips duplicatus
- Karnyothrips expandosus
- Karnyothrips festivus
- Karnyothrips flavicornis
- Karnyothrips flavipes
- Karnyothrips franciscanus
- Karnyothrips harti
- Karnyothrips inflatus
- Karnyothrips insignis
- Karnyothrips longiceps
- Karnyothrips maurilia
- Karnyothrips medialis
- Karnyothrips melaleucus
- Karnyothrips merrilli
- Karnyothrips minimus
- Karnyothrips mucidus
- Karnyothrips nevadensis
- Karnyothrips nigriflavus
- Karnyothrips noveboracensis
- Karnyothrips ochropezus
- Karnyothrips pacificus
- Karnyothrips palmerae
- Karnyothrips piceus
- Karnyothrips politus
- Karnyothrips prolatus
- Karnyothrips rhopalocerus
- Karnyothrips robustus
- Karnyothrips sonorensis
- Karnyothrips spinulus
- Karnyothrips sympathicus
- Karnyothrips tepoztlanensis
- Karnyothrips texensis
- Karnyothrips venustus
- Karnyothrips yoshi
