= Schwarzithrips =

Scientific classification
- Kingdom: Animalia
- Phylum: Arthropoda
- Class: Insecta
- Order: Thysanoptera
- Family: Phlaeothripidae
- Genus: Schwarzithrips; Morris & Mound, 2000

Genus of thrips

Schwarzithrips is a genus of thrips in the family Phlaeothripidae.

== Species ==
- Schwarzithrips glyphis Morris & Mound, 2000
- Schwarzithrips zammit Morris & Mound, 2000
