= Solomonthrips =

Scientific classification
- Kingdom: Animalia
- Phylum: Arthropoda
- Class: Insecta
- Order: Thysanoptera
- Family: Phlaeothripidae
- Genus: Solomonthrips; Mound, 1970

Genus of thrips

Solomonthrips is a genus of thrips in the family Phlaeothripidae.

== Species ==
- Solomonthrips australiensis
- Solomonthrips brooksi
- Solomonthrips fimbrii
- Solomonthrips greensladei
- Solomonthrips indonesiensis
- Solomonthrips intermedius
- Solomonthrips setifer
- Solomonthrips striatus
