= Porcothrips =

Scientific classification
- Kingdom: Animalia
- Phylum: Arthropoda
- Class: Insecta
- Order: Thysanoptera
- Family: Phlaeothripidae
- Genus: Porcothrips; Priesner, 1951

Genus of thrips

Porcothrips is a monotypic genus of thrips in the family Phlaeothripidae.

== Species ==
- Porcothrips liberiensis
