= Adrothrips =

Scientific classification
- Kingdom: Animalia
- Phylum: Arthropoda
- Class: Insecta
- Order: Thysanoptera
- Family: Phlaeothripidae
- Genus: Adrothrips; Moulton, 1942

Genus of thrips

Adrothrips is a genus of thrips in the family Phlaeothripidae.

== Species ==
- Adrothrips akanthus
- Adrothrips aureus
- Adrothrips cotteri
- Adrothrips intermedius
- Adrothrips systenus
