= Manothrips =

Scientific classification
- Kingdom: Animalia
- Phylum: Arthropoda
- Class: Insecta
- Order: Thysanoptera
- Family: Phlaeothripidae
- Genus: Manothrips; Priesner, 1953

Genus of thrips

Manothrips is a genus of thrips in the family Phlaeothripidae.

== Species ==
- Manothrips fortis
