= Eothrips =

Scientific classification
- Kingdom: Animalia
- Phylum: Arthropoda
- Class: Insecta
- Order: Thysanoptera
- Family: Phlaeothripidae
- Genus: Eothrips; Hood, 1915

Genus of thrips

Eothrips is a genus of thrips in the family Phlaeothripidae.

== Species ==
- Eothrips annulicornis
- Eothrips citritibia
- Eothrips coimbatorensis
- Eothrips connaticornis
- Eothrips crassicornis
- Eothrips distinctus
- Eothrips gemmiperda
- Eothrips gneticola
- Eothrips laticauda
- Eothrips laticeps
- Eothrips schouteniae
- Eothrips sirumalaiensis
- Eothrips trybomi
