= Hansonthrips =

Scientific classification
- Kingdom: Animalia
- Phylum: Arthropoda
- Class: Insecta
- Order: Thysanoptera
- Family: Phlaeothripidae
- Genus: Hansonthrips; Mound & Marullo, 1996

Genus of thrips

Hansonthrips is a genus of thrips in the family Phlaeothripidae.

== Species ==
- Hansonthrips drymus
- Hansonthrips selvae
