= Sucinothrips =

Sucinothrips Temporal range: 37.2–33.9 Ma Eocene

Scientific classification
- Kingdom: Animalia
- Phylum: Arthropoda
- Class: Insecta
- Order: Thysanoptera
- Family: Phlaeothripidae
- Genus: †Sucinothrips; Schliephake, 1999

Genus of thrips

Sucinothrips was a genus of thrips in the family Phlaeothripidae.

== Species ==
- †Sucinothrips incertus
