= Phenicothrips =

Scientific classification
- Kingdom: Animalia
- Phylum: Arthropoda
- Class: Insecta
- Order: Thysanoptera
- Family: Phlaeothripidae
- Genus: Phenicothrips; Priesner, 1968

Genus of thrips

Phenicothrips is a genus of thrips in the family Phlaeothripidae.

== Species ==
- Phenicothrips callosae
- Phenicothrips daetymon
- Phenicothrips eugeniae
- Phenicothrips gracilis
- Phenicothrips inquilinus
- Phenicothrips lividipes
- Phenicothrips siamensis
- Phenicothrips spectator
