= Gluphothrips =

Scientific classification
- Kingdom: Animalia
- Phylum: Arthropoda
- Class: Insecta
- Order: Thysanoptera
- Family: Phlaeothripidae
- Genus: Gluphothrips; Moulton, 1944

Genus of thrips

Gluphothrips is a genus of thrips in the family Phlaeothripidae.

== Species ==
- Gluphothrips varicolor
