= Pistillothrips =

Scientific classification
- Kingdom: Animalia
- Phylum: Arthropoda
- Class: Insecta
- Order: Thysanoptera
- Family: Phlaeothripidae
- Genus: Pistillothrips; Johansen, 1982

Genus of thrips

Pistillothrips is a genus of thrips in the family Phlaeothripidae.

== Species ==
- Pistillothrips guadalupae
