= Euoplothrips =

Scientific classification
- Kingdom: Animalia
- Phylum: Arthropoda
- Class: Insecta
- Order: Thysanoptera
- Family: Phlaeothripidae
- Genus: Euoplothrips; Hood, 1918

Genus of thrips

Euoplothrips is a genus of thrips in the family Phlaeothripidae.

== Species ==
- Euoplothrips bagnalli
- Euoplothrips buxtoni
- Euoplothrips carcinoides
- Euoplothrips malabaricus
- Euoplothrips platypodae
- Euoplothrips uncinatus
