= Trybomia =

Scientific classification
- Kingdom: Animalia
- Phylum: Arthropoda
- Class: Insecta
- Order: Thysanoptera
- Family: Phlaeothripidae
- Genus: Trybomia; Karny, 1911

Genus of thrips

Trybomia is a genus of thrips in the family Phlaeothripidae.

== Species ==
- Trybomia brevitubus
- Trybomia cesari
- Trybomia elongata
- Trybomia gossypii
- Trybomia intermedia
- Trybomia mendesi
