= Malacothrips =

Scientific classification
- Kingdom: Animalia
- Phylum: Arthropoda
- Class: Insecta
- Order: Thysanoptera
- Family: Phlaeothripidae
- Genus: Malacothrips; Hinds, 1902

Genus of thrips

Malacothrips is a genus of thrips in the family Phlaeothripidae.

== Species ==
- Malacothrips adranes
- Malacothrips afer
- Malacothrips antennata
- Malacothrips curepe
- Malacothrips fasciatus
- Malacothrips faurei
- Malacothrips mediator
- Malacothrips natalensis
- Malacothrips praeclarus
- Malacothrips pretoriensis
- Malacothrips riverai
- Malacothrips roycei
- Malacothrips tunapuna
- Malacothrips vigilatus
- Malacothrips zonatus
