= Cephenothrips =

Cephenothrips Temporal range: 37.2–33.9 Ma Eocene

Scientific classification
- Kingdom: Animalia
- Phylum: Arthropoda
- Class: Insecta
- Order: Thysanoptera
- Family: Phlaeothripidae
- Genus: †Cephenothrips; Priesner, 1929

Genus of thrips

Cephenothrips was a genus of thrips in the family Phlaeothripidae.

== Species ==
- †Cephenothrips laticeps
