= Walkerthrips =

Scientific classification
- Kingdom: Animalia
- Phylum: Arthropoda
- Class: Insecta
- Order: Thysanoptera
- Family: Phlaeothripidae
- Genus: Walkerthrips; Bhatti, 1995

Genus of thrips

Walkerthrips is a genus of thrips in the family Phlaeothripidae.

== Species ==
- Walkerthrips neatus
