= Thlibothrips =

Scientific classification
- Kingdom: Animalia
- Phylum: Arthropoda
- Class: Insecta
- Order: Thysanoptera
- Family: Phlaeothripidae
- Genus: Thlibothrips; Priesner, 1952

Genus of thrips

Thlibothrips is a genus of thrips in the family Phlaeothripidae.

== Species ==
- Thlibothrips antennalis
- Thlibothrips atavus
- Thlibothrips isunoki
- Thlibothrips malloti
- Thlibothrips manipurensis
- Thlibothrips nigricauda
- Thlibothrips primitivus
