= Panoplothrips =

Scientific classification
- Kingdom: Animalia
- Phylum: Arthropoda
- Class: Insecta
- Order: Thysanoptera
- Family: Phlaeothripidae
- Genus: Panoplothrips; Moulton, 1968

Genus of thrips

Panoplothrips is a genus of thrips in the family Phlaeothripidae.

== Species ==
- Panoplothrips australiensis
