= Ayyarothrips =

Scientific classification
- Kingdom: Animalia
- Phylum: Arthropoda
- Class: Insecta
- Order: Thysanoptera
- Family: Phlaeothripidae
- Genus: Ayyarothrips; Ananthakrishnan, 1972

Genus of thrips

Ayyarothrips is a genus of thrips in the family Phlaeothripidae.

== Species ==
- Ayyarothrips abstrusus
