= Apelaunothrips =

Scientific classification
- Kingdom: Animalia
- Phylum: Arthropoda
- Class: Insecta
- Order: Thysanoptera
- Family: Phlaeothripidae
- Genus: Apelaunothrips; Karny, 1925

Genus of thrips

Apelaunothrips is a genus of thrips in the family Phlaeothripidae.

== Species ==
- Apelaunothrips aokii
- Apelaunothrips armatus
- Apelaunothrips bhowalii
- Apelaunothrips bicolor
- Apelaunothrips bogor
- Apelaunothrips cephalicus
- Apelaunothrips citricrurus
- Apelaunothrips consimilis
- Apelaunothrips desleyae
- Apelaunothrips fasciatus
- Apelaunothrips femoralis
- Apelaunothrips flavicornis
- Apelaunothrips gabonensis
- Apelaunothrips gombak
- Apelaunothrips hainanensis
- Apelaunothrips haradai
- Apelaunothrips indicus
- Apelaunothrips japonicus
- Apelaunothrips leios
- Apelaunothrips lieni
- Apelaunothrips limbatus
- Apelaunothrips longidens
- Apelaunothrips lucidus
- Apelaunothrips luridus
- Apelaunothrips maculipennis
- Apelaunothrips madrasensis
- Apelaunothrips malayensis
- Apelaunothrips marginalis
- Apelaunothrips medioflavus
- Apelaunothrips montanus
- Apelaunothrips nigripennis
- Apelaunothrips ocularis
- Apelaunothrips philippinensis
- Apelaunothrips rostratus
- Apelaunothrips simpliceps
- Apelaunothrips spinalis
- Apelaunothrips tasmani
- Apelaunothrips tricolor
- Apelaunothrips zonatus
