= Polygonothrips =

Scientific classification
- Kingdom: Animalia
- Phylum: Arthropoda
- Class: Insecta
- Order: Thysanoptera
- Family: Phlaeothripidae
- Genus: Polygonothrips; Schliephake, 1999

Extinct genus of thrips

Polygonothrips is a fossil genus of thrips in the family Phlaeothripidae.

== Species ==
- †Polygonothrips apertosetosus
