= Horistothrips =

Scientific classification
- Kingdom: Animalia
- Phylum: Arthropoda
- Class: Insecta
- Order: Thysanoptera
- Family: Phlaeothripidae
- Genus: Horistothrips; Morgan, 1913

Genus of thrips

Horistothrips is a genus of thrips in the family Phlaeothripidae.

== Species ==
- Horistothrips australiae
- Horistothrips claruspilus
- Horistothrips magnafemora
- Horistothrips palidispinosus
- Horistothrips platygaster
