= Chiridurothrips =

Scientific classification
- Kingdom: Animalia
- Phylum: Arthropoda
- Class: Insecta
- Order: Thysanoptera
- Family: Phlaeothripidae
- Genus: Chiridurothrips; Okajima, 1981

Genus of thrips

Chiridurothrips is a genus of thrips in the family Phlaeothripidae.

== Species ==
- Chiridurothrips hisakoae
