= Conocephalothrips =

Scientific classification
- Kingdom: Animalia
- Phylum: Arthropoda
- Class: Insecta
- Order: Thysanoptera
- Family: Phlaeothripidae
- Genus: Conocephalothrips; Bianchi, 1946

Genus of thrips

Conocephalothrips is a genus of thrips in the family Phlaeothripidae.

== Species ==
- Conocephalothrips tricolor
