= Treherniella =

Treherniella Temporal range: 37.2–0 Ma Early Eocene to Present

Scientific classification
- Kingdom: Animalia
- Phylum: Arthropoda
- Class: Insecta
- Order: Thysanoptera
- Family: Phlaeothripidae
- Genus: Treherniella; Watson, 1924

Genus of thrips

Treherniella is a genus of thrips in the family Phlaeothripidae.

== Species ==
- Treherniella afra Priesner, 1935
- Treherniella amplipennis (Morgan, 1913)
- Treherniella atrata De Santis, 1963
- Treherniella daedalus (Karny, 1912)
- †Treherniella fossilis Priesner, 1929
- Treherniella inferna (Priesner, 1922)
