= Adelphothrips =

Scientific classification
- Kingdom: Animalia
- Phylum: Arthropoda
- Class: Insecta
- Order: Thysanoptera
- Family: Phlaeothripidae
- Genus: Adelphothrips; Priesner, 1953

Genus of thrips

Adelphothrips is a genus of thrips in the family Phlaeothripidae. Species are known to occur on Java, Fiji and in the Philippines.

== Species ==
- Adelphothrips ignotus
- Adelphothrips longisetosus
- Adelphothrips novioris
- Adelphothrips tristis
- Adelphothrips vernoniae
