= Diphyothrips =

Scientific classification
- Kingdom: Animalia
- Phylum: Arthropoda
- Class: Insecta
- Order: Thysanoptera
- Family: Phlaeothripidae
- Genus: Diphyothrips; Stannard, 1963

Genus of thrips

Diphyothrips is a genus of thrips in the family Phlaeothripidae.

== Species ==
- Diphyothrips morainensis
