= Adamantothrips =

Scientific classification
- Kingdom: Animalia
- Phylum: Arthropoda
- Class: Insecta
- Order: Thysanoptera
- Family: Phlaeothripidae
- Genus: Adamantothrips; Stannard, 1960

Genus of thrips

Adamantothrips is a genus of thrips in the family Phlaeothripidae.

== Species ==
- Adamantothrips asarcopus
