= Cartomothrips =

Scientific classification
- Kingdom: Animalia
- Phylum: Arthropoda
- Class: Insecta
- Order: Thysanoptera
- Family: Phlaeothripidae
- Genus: Cartomothrips; Stannard, 1963

Genus of thrips

Cartomothrips is a genus of thrips in the family Phlaeothripidae.

== Species ==
- Cartomothrips abrsi
- Cartomothrips browni
- Cartomothrips laughlini
- Cartomothrips manukae
- Cartomothrips neboissi
- Cartomothrips tofti
