= Medogothrips =

Scientific classification
- Kingdom: Animalia
- Phylum: Arthropoda
- Class: Insecta
- Order: Thysanoptera
- Family: Phlaeothripidae
- Genus: Medogothrips; Han, 1988

Genus of thrips

Medogothrips is a genus of thrips in the family Phlaeothripidae.

== Species ==
- Medogothrips reticulatus
