= Maxillata =

Scientific classification
- Kingdom: Animalia
- Phylum: Arthropoda
- Class: Insecta
- Order: Thysanoptera
- Family: Phlaeothripidae
- Genus: Maxillata; Faure, 1949

Genus of thrips

Maxillata is a genus of thrips in the family Phlaeothripidae.

== Species ==
- Maxillata allani
- Maxillata priesneri
- Maxillata tremblayi
