= Ponticulothrips =

Scientific classification
- Kingdom: Animalia
- Phylum: Arthropoda
- Class: Insecta
- Order: Thysanoptera
- Family: Phlaeothripidae
- Genus: Ponticulothrips; Haga & Okajima, 1983

Genus of thrips

Ponticulothrips is a monotypic genus of thrips in the family Phlaeothripidae.

== Species ==
- Ponticulothrips diospyrosi
