= Necrothrips =

Scientific classification
- Kingdom: Animalia
- Phylum: Arthropoda
- Class: Insecta
- Order: Thysanoptera
- Family: Phlaeothripidae
- Genus: Necrothrips; Priesner, 1924

Extinct genus of thrips

Necrothrips is a fossil genus of thrips in the family Phlaeothripidae.

== Species ==
- †Necrothrips major
- †Necrothrips nanus
