= Stictothrips =

Scientific classification
- Kingdom: Animalia
- Phylum: Arthropoda
- Class: Insecta
- Order: Thysanoptera
- Family: Phlaeothripidae
- Genus: Stictothrips; Hood, 1925

Genus of thrips

Stictothrips is a genus of thrips in the family Phlaeothripidae.

== Species ==
- Stictothrips aoristus
- Stictothrips faurei
- Stictothrips leopardinus
- Stictothrips maculatus
- Stictothrips namadji
