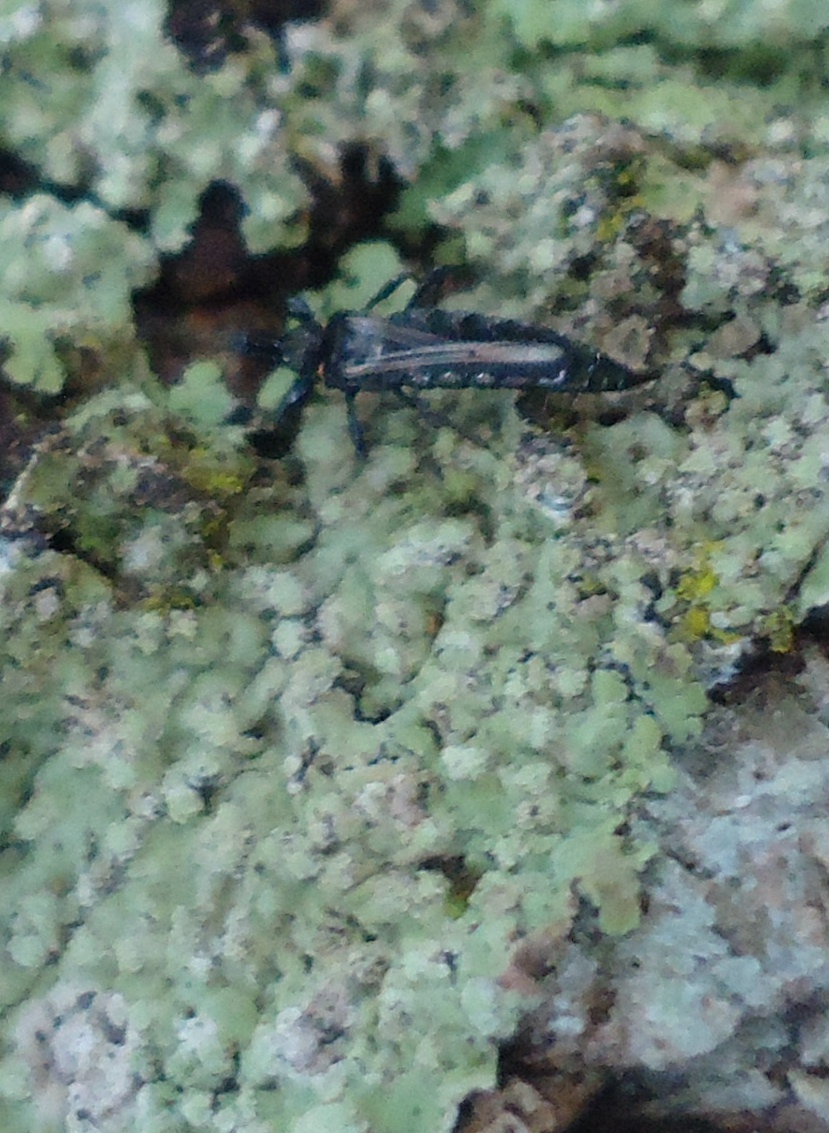
- Fungus feeding thrip from the Philippines

Scientific classification
- Kingdom: Animalia
- Phylum: Arthropoda
- Class: Insecta
- Order: Thysanoptera
- Family: Phlaeothripidae
- Subfamily: Idolothripinae; Bagnall, 1908

Genera
- See text

Diversity
- 82 genera

= Idolothripinae =

Subfamily of thrips

The Idolothripinae are a subfamily of thrips, with about 82 genera. This subfamily was first described in 1908 by Richard Siddoway Bagnall.

== Genera ==
This list of genera in the subfamily Idolothripinae is complete according to the Thrips of the World Checklist (January 4, 2007).

- Acallurothrips
- Actinothrips
- Aesthesiothrips
- Allidothrips
- Allopisothrips
- Allothrips
- Anactinothrips
- Anaglyptothrips
- Anallothrips
- Atractothrips
- Azeugmatothrips
- Bacillothrips
- Bactrothrips
- Bolothrips
- Campulothrips
- Carientothrips
- Celidothrips
- Ceuthothrips
- Cleistothrips
- Compsothrips
- Cryptothrips
- Cylindrothrips
- Cyphothrips
- Dermothrips
- Diaphorothrips
- Diceratothrips
- Dichaetothrips
- Dinothrips
- Diplacothrips
- Ecacleistothrips
- Egchocephalothrips
- Elaphrothrips
- Elgonima
- Emprosthiothrips
- Ethirothrips
- Faureothrips
- Gastrothrips
- Hartwigia
- Heptathrips
- Herathrips
- Holurothrips
- Hybridothrips
- Hystricothrips
- Idolothrips
- Illinothrips
- Ischyrothrips
- Lamillothrips
- Lasiothrips
- Loyolaia
- Machatothrips
- Macrothrips
- Malesiathrips
- Mecynothrips
- Megalothrips
- Megathrips
- Meiothrips
- Minaeithrips
- Neatractothrips
- Neosmerinthothrips
- Nesidiothrips
- Nesothrips
- Ophthalmothrips
- Ozothrips
- Paractinothrips
- Pelinothrips
- Peltariothrips
- Phacothrips
- Phaulothrips
- Pinaceothrips
- Polytrichothrips
- Priesneriana
- Priesneriella
- Pseudocryptothrips
- Pseudoeurhynchothrips
- Pygothrips
- Saurothrips
- Sporothrips
- Tarassothrips
- Tiarothrips
- Zactinothrips
- Zeuglothrips
- Zeugmatothrips
