= Octurothrips =

Scientific classification
- Kingdom: Animalia
- Phylum: Arthropoda
- Class: Insecta
- Order: Thysanoptera
- Family: Phlaeothripidae
- Genus: Octurothrips; Priesner, 1931

Genus of thrips

Octurothrips is a genus of thrips in the family Phlaeothripidae, first described by Hermann Priesner in 1931. There is just one species in this genus: Octurothrips pulcher.

This genus and species has unusually long abdominal segments IX and X. It shares many of the characters of Habrothrips, but its head and antennae are very different.

== Distribution and habitat ==
It has been found in Victoria, South Australia and Queensland in inland arid zones, by beating the stems of various Acacias. It is thought to feed on fungus.
