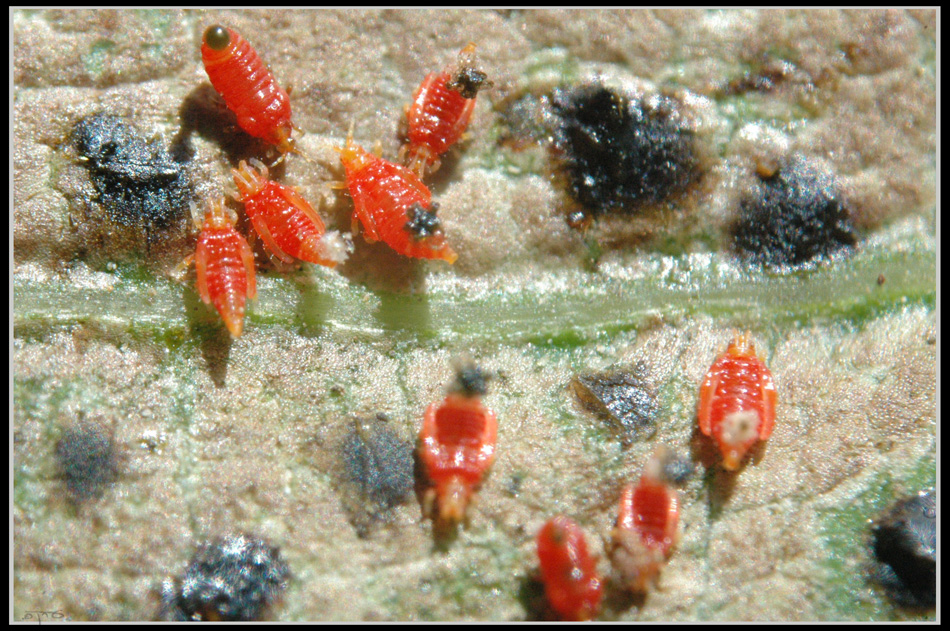
- Retithrips syriacus

Scientific classification
- Kingdom: Animalia
- Phylum: Arthropoda
- Class: Insecta
- Order: Thysanoptera
- Family: Thripidae
- Subfamily: Panchaetothripinae; Bagnall, 1912

= Panchaetothripinae =

Subfamily of thrips

Panchaetothripinae is a subfamily of thrips in the family Thripidae, first described in 1912 by Richard Siddoway Bagnall. There are about 11 genera and more than 50 described species in Panchaetothripinae.

== Genera ==
These 11 genera belong to the subfamily Panchaetothripinae:

- Anisopilothrips Stannard & Mitri, 1962
- Caliothrips Daniel, 1904
- Dinurothrips Hood, 1913
- Elixothrips Stannard & Mitri, 1962
- Heliothrips Haliday, 1836
- Hercinothrips Bagnall, 1932
- Hoodothrips Bondar, 1931
- Monilothrips Moulton, 1929
- Parthenothrips Uzel, 1895
- Retithrips Marchal, 1910
- Selenothrips Karny, 1911
