= Holcothrips =

Scientific classification
- Kingdom: Animalia
- Phylum: Arthropoda
- Class: Insecta
- Order: Thysanoptera
- Family: Phlaeothripidae
- Genus: Holcothrips; Hood, 1954

Species
- Holcothrips achmaeae Hood, 1954

Genus of thrips

Holcothrips is a genus of thrips in the family Phlaeothripidae.
