= Koptothrips =

Scientific classification
- Kingdom: Animalia
- Phylum: Arthropoda
- Class: Insecta
- Order: Thysanoptera
- Family: Phlaeothripidae
- Genus: Koptothrips; Bagnall, 1929

Type species
- Koptothrips flavicornis Bagnall, 1929

Genus of thrips

Koptothrips is a genus of thrips in the family Phlaeothripidae, first described by Richard Siddoway Bagnall in 1929.

Species in this genus are kleptoparasites, that is they steal galls made by thrips in the Kladothrips genus on Acacia phyllodes. They kill the Kladothrips adults but feed on the gall.

== Species ==
There are just four species in this genus, all of which are found in Australia, in all mainland states and territories.

- Koptothrips dyskritus
- Koptothrips flavicornis
- Koptothrips xenus
- Koptothrips zelus
