= Streptothrips =

Scientific classification
- Kingdom: Animalia
- Phylum: Arthropoda
- Class: Insecta
- Order: Thysanoptera
- Family: Phlaeothripidae
- Genus: Streptothrips; Priesner, 1932

Genus of thrips

Streptothrips is a genus of thrips in the family Phlaeothripidae.

== Species ==
- Streptothrips chaberti
- Streptothrips femoralis
- Streptothrips impatiens
- Streptothrips insolitus
- Streptothrips jacoti
- Streptothrips mirabilis
- Streptothrips nudus
- Streptothrips rostratus
- Streptothrips tibialis
- Streptothrips tribulatius
