= Praepodothrips =

Scientific classification
- Kingdom: Animalia
- Phylum: Arthropoda
- Class: Insecta
- Order: Thysanoptera
- Family: Phlaeothripidae
- Genus: Praepodothrips; Priesner & Seshadri, 1952

Genus of thrips

Praepodothrips is a genus of thrips in the family Phlaeothripidae.

== Species ==
- Praepodothrips causiapeltus
- Praepodothrips cymbapogoni
- Praepodothrips flavicornis
- Praepodothrips indicus
- Praepodothrips nigrocephalus
- Praepodothrips priesneri
- Praepodothrips yunnanensis
