= Psalidothrips =

Scientific classification
- Kingdom: Animalia
- Phylum: Arthropoda
- Class: Insecta
- Order: Thysanoptera
- Family: Phlaeothripidae
- Genus: Psalidothrips; Priesner, 1932

Type species
- Psalidothrips amens

Genus of thrips

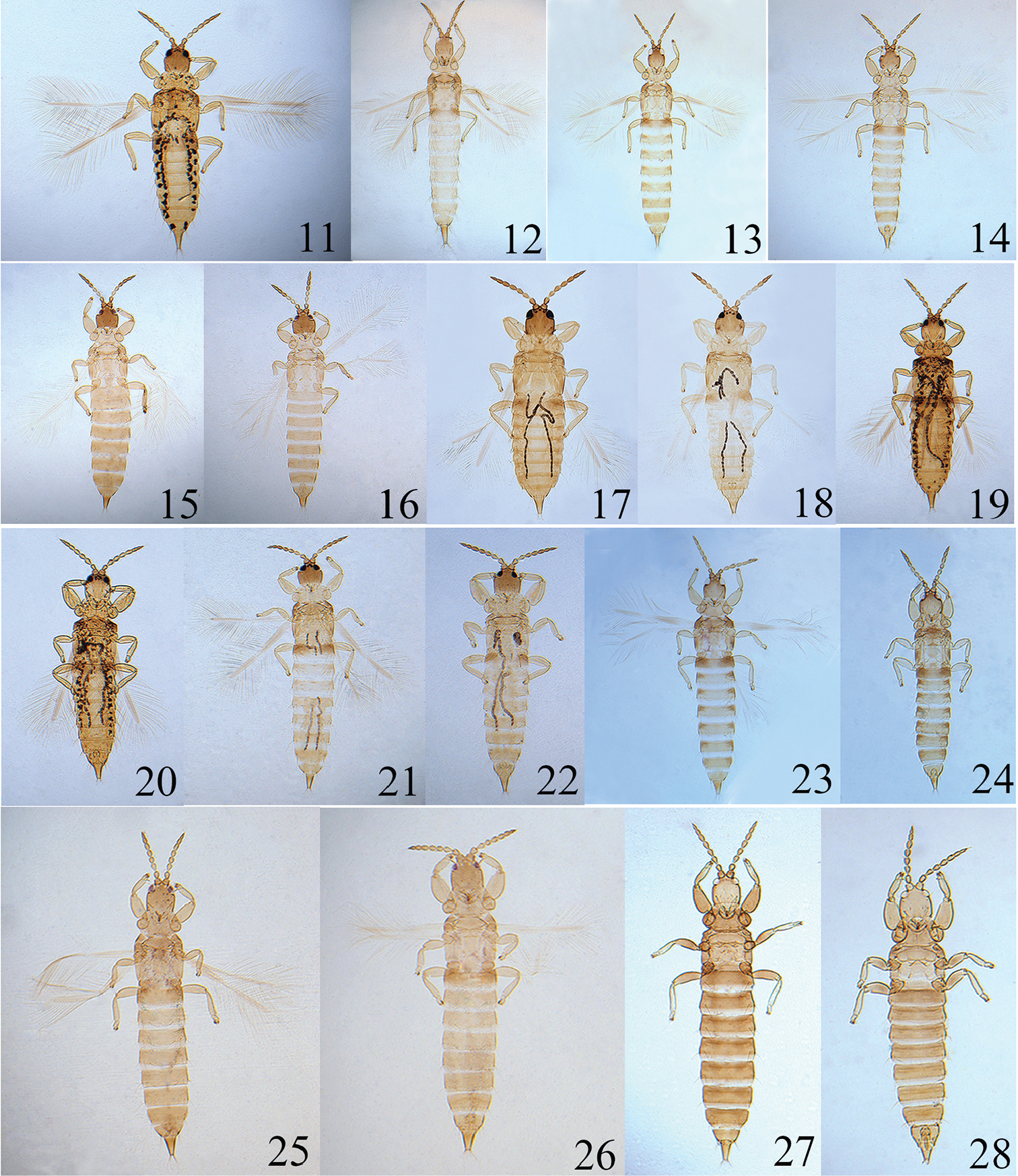
Psalidothrips sp.

Psalidothrips is a genus of thrips in the family Phlaeothripidae, first described by Hermann Priesner in 1932.

== Species ==
Species listed in ITIS:

- Psalidothrips amens
- Psalidothrips ananthakrishnani
- Psalidothrips angustus
- Psalidothrips armatus
- Psalidothrips ascitus
- Psalidothrips bicoloratus
- Psalidothrips chebalingicus
- Psalidothrips comosus
- Psalidothrips conciliatus
- Psalidothrips consimilis
- Psalidothrips dissidens
- Psalidothrips elegatus
- Psalidothrips fabarius
- Psalidothrips grandis
- Psalidothrips latizonus
- Psalidothrips lewisi
- Psalidothrips longiceps
- Psalidothrips longidens
- Psalidothrips longistylus
- Psalidothrips minor
- Psalidothrips moeone
- Psalidothrips nigroterminatus
- Psalidothrips oblongulus
- Psalidothrips ochraceus
- Psalidothrips pitkini
- Psalidothrips retifer
- Psalidothrips seticornis
- Psalidothrips simplus
- Psalidothrips spinosus
- Psalidothrips sturmi
- Psalidothrips tane
- Psalidothrips taylori
- Psalidothrips umbraticus

Sixteen species are native to Australia.

- Psalidothrips bipictus Wang, Mound & Tree, 2019
- Psalidothrips brittoni Wang, Mound & Tree, 2019
- Psalidothrips cecryphalus Wang, Mound & Tree, 2019
- Psalidothrips daguilari Wang, Mound & Tree, 2019
- Psalidothrips driesseni Wang, Mound & Tree, 2019
- Psalidothrips gloriousi Wang, Mound & Tree, 2019
- Psalidothrips greensladeae Wang, Mound & Tree, 2019
- Psalidothrips howei Wang, Mound & Tree, 2019
- Psalidothrips minantennus Wang, Mound & Tree, 2019
- Psalidothrips platetus Wang, Mound & Tree, 2019
- Psalidothrips postlei Wang, Mound & Tree, 2019
- Psalidothrips taylori Mound & Walker, 1986
- Psalidothrips tritus Wang, Mound & Tree, 2019
- Psalidothrips trivius Wang, Mound & Tree, 2019
- Psalidothrips verus Wang, Mound & Tree, 2019
- Psalidothrips wellsae Wang, Mound & Tree, 2019
