= Plectrothrips =

Scientific classification
- Kingdom: Animalia
- Phylum: Arthropoda
- Class: Insecta
- Order: Thysanoptera
- Family: Phlaeothripidae
- Genus: Plectrothrips; Hood, 1908

Genus of thrips

Plectrothrips is a genus of thrips in the family Phlaeothripidae, first described by Joseph Douglas Hood in 1908.

== Species ==
- Plectrothrips ananthakrishnani
- Plectrothrips angolensis
- Plectrothrips antennatus
- Plectrothrips atactus
- Plectrothrips australis
- Plectrothrips bicolor
- Plectrothrips bicuspis
- Plectrothrips brevitubus
- Plectrothrips capensis
- Plectrothrips collaris
- Plectrothrips corticinus
- Plectrothrips crassiceps
- Plectrothrips crocatus
- Plectrothrips debilis
- Plectrothrips eximius
- Plectrothrips giganteus
- Plectrothrips glaber
- Plectrothrips gracilis
- Plectrothrips hiromasai
- Plectrothrips hoodi
- Plectrothrips indicus
- Plectrothrips latus
- Plectrothrips lobatus
- Plectrothrips longisetis
- Plectrothrips nigricornis
- Plectrothrips okinawanus
- Plectrothrips orientalis
- Plectrothrips pallipes
- Plectrothrips richardi
- Plectrothrips rotundus
- Plectrothrips tenuis
- Plectrothrips thoracicus
