= Lissothrips =

Scientific classification
- Kingdom: Animalia
- Phylum: Arthropoda
- Class: Insecta
- Order: Thysanoptera
- Family: Phlaeothripidae
- Genus: Lissothrips; Hood, 1908

Genus of thrips

Lissothrips is a genus of thrips in the family Phlaeothripidae.

== Species ==
- Lissothrips clayae
- Lissothrips corticosus
- Lissothrips dentatus
- Lissothrips discus
- Lissothrips dispar
- Lissothrips dugdalei
- Lissothrips eburifer
- Lissothrips flavidus
- Lissothrips flavitibia
- Lissothrips furvoviridis
- Lissothrips gersoni
- Lissothrips hurricanus
- Lissothrips hypni
- Lissothrips muscorum
- Lissothrips obesus
- Lissothrips okajimai
- Lissothrips tallagandai
- Lissothrips taverni
- Lissothrips tepoztlanensis
- Lissothrips thomsonae
- Lissothrips uniformis
- Lissothrips xalapaensis
- Lissothrips zacualtipanensis
