= Elaphrothrips =

Scientific classification
- Kingdom: Animalia
- Phylum: Arthropoda
- Class: Insecta
- Order: Thysanoptera
- Family: Phlaeothripidae
- Subfamily: Idolothripinae
- Genus: Elaphrothrips; Buffa, 1909

Genus of thrips

Elaphrothrips is a genus of tube-tailed thrips in the family Phlaeothripidae. There are at least 40 described species in Elaphrothrips.

== Species ==
These 40 species belong to the genus Elaphrothrips:

- Elaphrothrips acanthomerus Hood
- Elaphrothrips achaetus Bagnall
- Elaphrothrips armatus (Hood, 1908)
- Elaphrothrips athletes (Karny, 1923)
- Elaphrothrips aztecus Hood
- Elaphrothrips bilineatus Priesner, 1933
- Elaphrothrips blatchleyi Hood, 1938
- Elaphrothrips borgmeieri Hood
- Elaphrothrips capensis Faure
- Elaphrothrips coniferarum (Pergande, 1896)
- Elaphrothrips costalimai Hood
- Elaphrothrips dampfi Hood
- Elaphrothrips defectus Hood
- Elaphrothrips edouardi Jacot-Guillarmod
- Elaphrothrips falcatus Karny, 1912
- Elaphrothrips faurei Jacot-Guillarmod
- Elaphrothrips flavipes (Hood, 1908)
- Elaphrothrips imitator Priesner, 1935
- Elaphrothrips indagator Hood
- Elaphrothrips jacotguillarmodi Johansen, 1979
- Elaphrothrips macateei Hood
- Elaphrothrips medius Hartwig
- Elaphrothrips mucronatus Priesner
- Elaphrothrips niger Jacot-Guillarmod
- Elaphrothrips nigripes Jacot-Guillarmod
- Elaphrothrips orangiae Jacot-Guillarmod
- Elaphrothrips parallelus Hood, 1924
- Elaphrothrips peruviensis Hood
- Elaphrothrips powelli Jacot-Guillarmod
- Elaphrothrips prospector Hood
- Elaphrothrips schoutedeni Priesner
- Elaphrothrips sensitivus
- Elaphrothrips snodgrassi Hood
- Elaphrothrips spiniceps Bagnall, 1932
- Elaphrothrips sumbanus Priesner
- Elaphrothrips tener Priesner, 1925
- Elaphrothrips tuberculatus (Hood, 1908)
- Elaphrothrips valerioi Retana & Soto, 2002
- Elaphrothrips vittipennis Hood, 1940
- Elaphrothrips zetetis Hood
