= Preeriella =

Scientific classification
- Kingdom: Animalia
- Phylum: Arthropoda
- Class: Insecta
- Order: Thysanoptera
- Family: Phlaeothripidae
- Genus: Preeriella; Hood, 1939

Genus of thrips

Preeriella is a genus of thrips in the family Phlaeothripidae.

== Species ==
- Preeriella angolensis
- Preeriella armigera
- Preeriella bournieri
- Preeriella brevicornis
- Preeriella crassisetis
- Preeriella discors
- Preeriella formosana
- Preeriella fumosa
- Preeriella jacotia
- Preeriella macilenta
- Preeriella major
- Preeriella malaya
- Preeriella marginata
- Preeriella microsoma
- Preeriella minutus
- Preeriella moundi
- Preeriella parvula
- Preeriella pitkini
- Preeriella secticornis
- Preeriella totanaca
