= Scopaeothrips =

Scientific classification
- Kingdom: Animalia
- Phylum: Arthropoda
- Class: Insecta
- Order: Thysanoptera
- Family: Phlaeothripidae
- Genus: Scopaeothrips; Hood, 1912

Genus of thrips

Scopaeothrips is a genus of thrips in the family Phlaeothripidae.

== Species ==
- Scopaeothrips bicolor
- Scopaeothrips unicolor
