= Sophiothrips =

Scientific classification
- Kingdom: Animalia
- Phylum: Arthropoda
- Class: Insecta
- Order: Thysanoptera
- Family: Phlaeothripidae
- Genus: Sophiothrips; Hood, 1934

Genus of thrips

Sophiothrips is a genus of thrips in the family Phlaeothripidae.

== Species ==
- Sophiothrips aleurodisci
- Sophiothrips annulatus
- Sophiothrips bicolor
- Sophiothrips boltoni
- Sophiothrips breviceps
- Sophiothrips canberrae
- Sophiothrips comptus
- Sophiothrips crassicollis
- Sophiothrips darwini
- Sophiothrips decorus
- Sophiothrips duvali
- Sophiothrips greensladei
- Sophiothrips kibbyi
- Sophiothrips makaronesicus
- Sophiothrips martinae
- Sophiothrips mongae
- Sophiothrips nigrus
- Sophiothrips panamensis
- Sophiothrips parviceps
- Sophiothrips peculiaris
- Sophiothrips placodes
- Sophiothrips politus
- Sophiothrips postlei
- Sophiothrips spadix
- Sophiothrips squamosus
- Sophiothrips terminalis
- Sophiothrips tumidus
- Sophiothrips typicus
- Sophiothrips unicolor
- Sophiothrips verrucosus
- Sophiothrips vorticosus
