= Litotetothrips =

Scientific classification
- Kingdom: Animalia
- Phylum: Arthropoda
- Class: Insecta
- Order: Thysanoptera
- Family: Phlaeothripidae
- Genus: Litotetothrips; Priesner, 1929

Genus of thrips

Litotetothrips is a genus of thrips in the family Phlaeothripidae.

== Species ==
- Litotetothrips berangan
- Litotetothrips guineaensis
- Litotetothrips hainanensis
- Litotetothrips keladan
- Litotetothrips kochummeni
- Litotetothrips medangteja
- Litotetothrips pasaniae
- Litotetothrips pinanganus
- Litotetothrips roberti
- Litotetothrips rotundus
- Litotetothrips shoreae
