= Leptothrips =

Scientific classification
- Kingdom: Animalia
- Phylum: Arthropoda
- Class: Insecta
- Order: Thysanoptera
- Family: Phlaeothripidae
- Genus: Leptothrips; Hood, 1909

Genus of thrips

Leptothrips is a genus of thrips in the family Phlaeothripidae.

== Species ==
- Leptothrips astutus
- Leptothrips cassiae
- Leptothrips cognatopini
- Leptothrips columbianus
- Leptothrips costalimai
- Leptothrips distalis
- Leptothrips fasciculatus
- Leptothrips garciaaldreti
- Leptothrips gracilis
- Leptothrips heliomanes
- Leptothrips jamaicaensis
- Leptothrips larreae
- Leptothrips longicapitis
- Leptothrips macroocellatus
- Leptothrips mali
- Leptothrips mcconelli
- Leptothrips minusculus
- Leptothrips obesus
- Leptothrips occidentalis
- Leptothrips opimus
- Leptothrips oribates
- Leptothrips papago
- Leptothrips pini
- Leptothrips purpuratus
- Leptothrips singularis
- Leptothrips tenuiceps
- Leptothrips trinitatensis
- Leptothrips vittipennis
- Leptothrips yaqui
- Leptothrips zongolicaensis
