= Williamsiella =

Scientific classification
- Kingdom: Animalia
- Phylum: Arthropoda
- Clade: Pancrustacea
- Class: Insecta
- Order: Thysanoptera
- Family: Phlaeothripidae
- Genus: Williamsiella; Hood, 1925

Genus of thrips

Williamsiella is a genus of thrips in the family Phlaeothripidae.

== Species ==
- Williamsiella bicoloripes
- Williamsiella brasiliensis
- Williamsiella breviceps
- Williamsiella brevisetis
- Williamsiella capitulata
- Williamsiella claripes
- Williamsiella fictiopediculus
- Williamsiella insperata
- Williamsiella jacoti
- Williamsiella johanseni
- Williamsiella longiceps
- Williamsiella longisetis
- Williamsiella morgani
- Williamsiella muscoaffinis
- Williamsiella nemoralis
- Williamsiella ocellata
- Williamsiella pallipes
- Williamsiella pediculus
- Williamsiella perotensis
- Williamsiella tambopata
- Williamsiella texoloensis
- Williamsiella tipitzina
- Williamsiella totonacapana
- Williamsiella tricosa
- Williamsiella ventralis
- Williamsiella zaps
