= Bradythrips =

Scientific classification
- Kingdom: Animalia
- Phylum: Arthropoda
- Class: Insecta
- Order: Thysanoptera
- Family: Phlaeothripidae
- Genus: Bradythrips; Hood & Williams, 1925

Genus of thrips

Bradythrips is a genus of thrips in the family Phlaeothripidae.

== Species ==
- Bradythrips anteromarginalis
- Bradythrips fuscus
- Bradythrips hesperus
- Bradythrips malayanus
- Bradythrips philippinensis
- Bradythrips zhangi
