= Xylaplothrips =

Scientific classification
- Kingdom: Animalia
- Phylum: Arthropoda
- Class: Insecta
- Order: Thysanoptera
- Family: Phlaeothripidae
- Genus: Xylaplothrips; Priesner, 1928

Genus of thrips

Xylaplothrips is a genus of thrips in the family Phlaeothripidae.

== Species ==
- Xylaplothrips ananthakrishnani
- Xylaplothrips bamboosae
- Xylaplothrips bogoriensis
- Xylaplothrips caliginosus
- Xylaplothrips clavipes
- Xylaplothrips darci
- Xylaplothrips debilis
- Xylaplothrips dubius
- Xylaplothrips emineus
- Xylaplothrips flavitibia
- Xylaplothrips flavus
- Xylaplothrips fuliginosus
- Xylaplothrips fungicola
- Xylaplothrips inquilinus
- Xylaplothrips ligs
- Xylaplothrips micans
- Xylaplothrips mimus
- Xylaplothrips montanus
- Xylaplothrips pictipes
- Xylaplothrips pusillus
- Xylaplothrips reedi
- Xylaplothrips subterraneus
- Xylaplothrips tener
- Xylaplothrips togashii
- Xylaplothrips trinervoidis
- Xylaplothrips ulmi
- Xylaplothrips zawirskae
