= Thorybothrips =

Scientific classification
- Kingdom: Animalia
- Phylum: Arthropoda
- Class: Insecta
- Order: Thysanoptera
- Family: Phlaeothripidae
- Genus: Thorybothrips; Priesner, 1924

Genus of thrips

Thorybothrips is a genus of thrips in the family Phlaeothripidae.

== Species ==
- Thorybothrips unicolor
- Thorybothrips yuccae
