= Neocecidothrips =

Scientific classification
- Kingdom: Animalia
- Phylum: Arthropoda
- Class: Insecta
- Order: Thysanoptera
- Family: Phlaeothripidae
- Genus: Neocecidothrips; Bagnall, 1928

Genus of thrips

Neocecidothrips is a genus of thrips in the family Phlaeothripidae, first described by Richard Siddoway Bagnall in 1929.

== Species ==
- Neocecidothrips bursariae
- Neocecidothrips curviseta
