= Goniothrips =

Scientific classification
- Kingdom: Animalia
- Phylum: Arthropoda
- Class: Insecta
- Order: Thysanoptera
- Family: Phlaeothripidae
- Genus: Goniothrips; Hood, 1927

Genus of thrips

Goniothrips is a genus of thrips in the family Phlaeothripidae.

== Species ==
- Goniothrips denticornis
