= Liophlaeothrips =

Emphytopsis

Scientific classification
- Kingdom: Animalia
- Phylum: Arthropoda
- Class: Insecta
- Order: Thysanoptera
- Family: Phlaeothripidae
- Subfamily: Phlaeothripinae
- Genus: Liophlaeothrips; Priesner, 1919

Genus of thrips

Liophlaeothrips is a genus of thrips in the family Phlaeothripidae.

== Species ==
- Liophlaeothrips acaciae Tyagi & Kumar, 2011
- Liophlaeothrips cecidii Ananthakrishnan, 1964
- Liophlaeothrips pavettae Ananthakrishnan & Jagdish
