= Moultonides =

Scientific classification
- Kingdom: Animalia
- Phylum: Arthropoda
- Class: Insecta
- Order: Thysanoptera
- Family: Phlaeothripidae
- Genus: Moultonides; Bagnall, 1928

Genus of thrips

Moultonides is a genus of thrips in the family Phlaeothripidae.

== Species ==
- Moultonides geijerae
