= Chorithrips =

Scientific classification
- Kingdom: Animalia
- Phylum: Arthropoda
- Class: Insecta
- Order: Thysanoptera
- Family: Phlaeothripidae
- Genus: Chorithrips; Hood, 1957

Genus of thrips

Chorithrips is a genus of thrips in the family Phlaeothripidae.

== Species ==
- Chorithrips heptatoma
- Chorithrips octotoma
