= Athlibothrips =

Scientific classification
- Kingdom: Animalia
- Phylum: Arthropoda
- Class: Insecta
- Order: Thysanoptera
- Family: Phlaeothripidae
- Genus: Athlibothrips; Priesner, 1952

Genus of thrips

Athlibothrips is a genus of thrips in the family Phlaeothripidae, first described by Hermann Priesner in 1952.

== Species ==
- Athlibothrips caledonensis
- Athlibothrips fuscipes
- Athlibothrips inquilinus
- Athlibothrips yercaudensis
