= Idolothrips =

Scientific classification
- Kingdom: Animalia
- Phylum: Arthropoda
- Class: Insecta
- Order: Thysanoptera
- Family: Phlaeothripidae
- Subfamily: Idolothripinae
- Genus: Idolothrips; Haliday in Walker, 1852

Genus of thrips

Idolothrips is a genus of thrips in the family Phlaeothripidae.

== Species ==
- Idolothrips dissimilis
- Idolothrips spectrum
- Idolothrips yashiroi
