= Vale of Derwent Naturalists' Field Club =

County Durham natural history society, founded in 1887

The Vale of Derwent Naturalists' Field Club, founded in May 1887, was a natural history, geological and historical society based in Burnopfield in County Durham. The club developed a role in promoting natural history education in County Durham, extending to a number of notable scientists, academics and other public figures.

== Development of adult education in County Durham ==
Burnopfield was at the heart of the United Kingdom's Durham Coalfield where the latter half of the 19th century saw social progress, including the development of local co-operative societies, the creation of the Durham Miners' Association by activists such as John Forman and the Northumberland & Durham Miners' Relief Fund. Basic education was introduced by the Elementary Education Act 1870 which lead to the creation of local School Boards. This helped to create a demand and supply for adult education in County Durham, which was encouraged by the co-operative societies, the Temperance movement, reading rooms, trade unions and church groups. Partly this was attributed to the prospect of better pay and conditions within the coal mining industry, for those who obtained technical qualifications. It was also the case that children entered into the workforce, including down coalmines, upon completion of compulsory schooling, typically when 12 to 14 years old. So many of those seeking adult education were still relatively young.

The North of England Institute of Mining and Mechanical Engineers, better known as the Mining Institute, is a learned society for those involved in coal mining and founded in nearby Newcastle in 1852. Its library developed into one of the comprehensive collections of its type in the world, including coverage on geology.

Within this social context, the Vale of Derwent Naturalists' Field Club was founded as a society that spanned class divisions, and included miners, steelworkers and their families, as well as eminent industrialists, geologists, entomologists and ornithologists. The Club took its name from the River Derwent, a tributary of the River Tyne that starts from Blanchland and works its way north of Consett and Burnopfield and south of Rowlands Gill, joining the Tyne near Blaydon. Though the club used the word "vale" in their title, the area is more generally known as Derwent Valley, including by the club's members. The valley itself includes ancient woodlands and hay meadows and is noted for its wildlife.

== Founding of the society ==
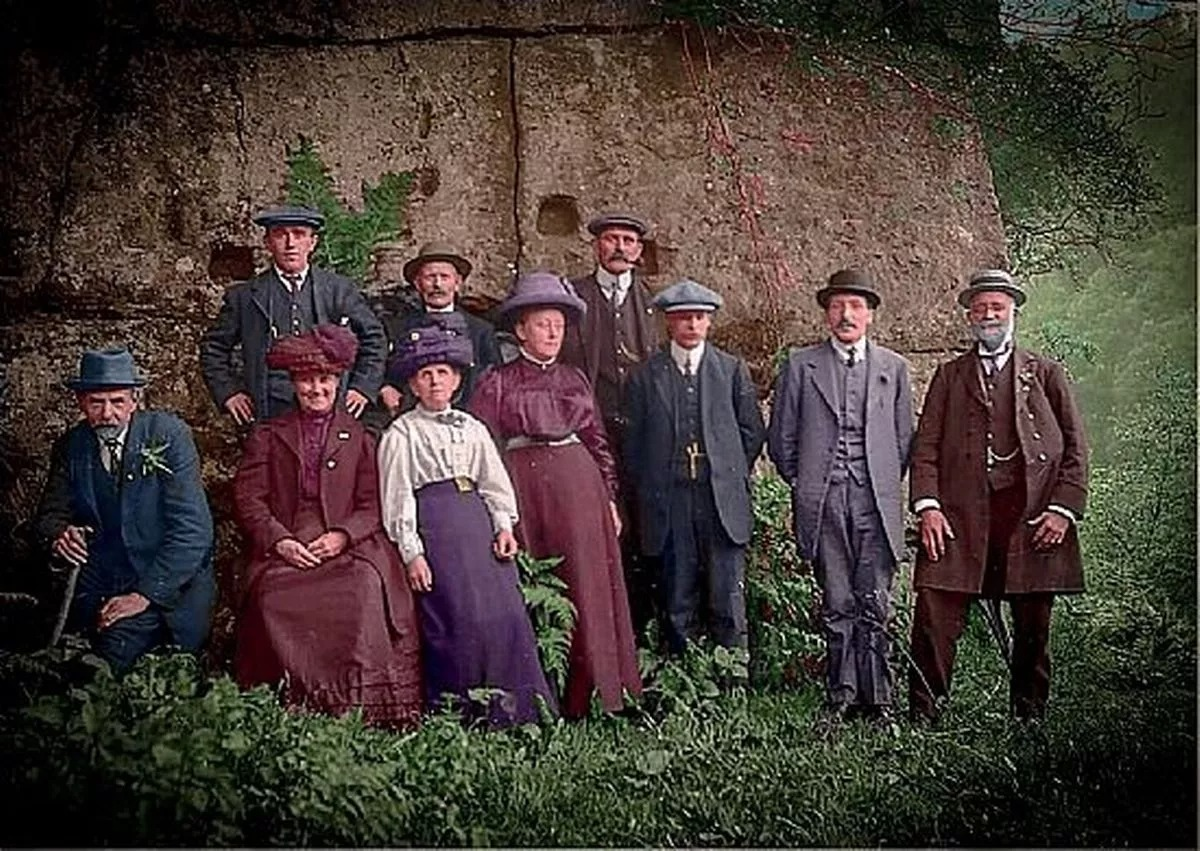
Vale of Derwent Naturalists' Field Club visit to Gibraltar Rock, Blanchland, County Durham, the source of River Derwent, circa 1909.

The Vale of Derwent Naturalists' Field Club was founded in May 1887. It started with some younger men who took part in science classes held in the hall of the Burnopfield Co-operative Stores. The purpose of the Club was to "bring together, for their mutual interest and improvement, those residents in the district who are students of Nature; to collect and investigate facts related to the natural history and antiquities of the Derwent Valley; and to arrange excursions to places of interest in the neighbourhood.".

The range of activities expanded over time, including excursions to Fountains Abbey in Yorkshire. Winter activities could include lectures and readings of recently published natural history literature. The Club also published its own research and findings, such as investigations into the wild birds and ferns found in the area. Visits were held at a range different venues such as a paper factory, parks, and to the Roman antiquities by Hadrian's Wall nearby.

Natural history clubs and societies were becoming popular at this time, but the Vale of Derwent Naturalists' Field Club distinguished themselves by publishing their reports and findings at regular intervals, and at some length, in the form of printed books and pamphlets. The Natural History correspondent of Darlington's North Star newspaper gave fulsome praise on receipt of volume IV of their transactions in 1903, noting that many similar organisations "fail to produce any measurable results", whereas in the case of the Vale of Derwent club "we have evidently a naturalist society directing its efforts to a practical purpose."

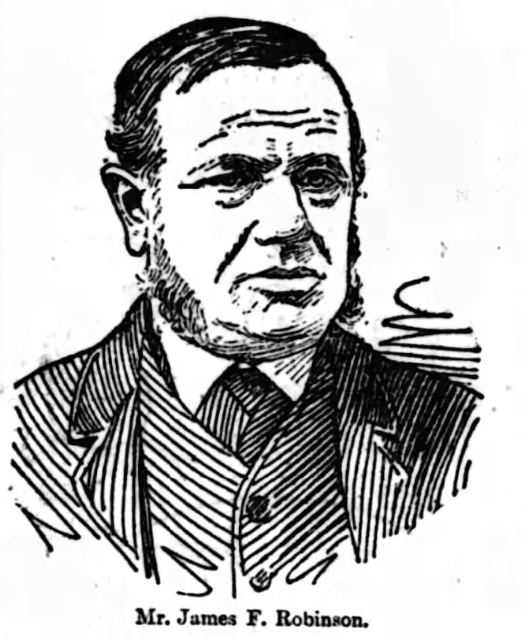
James F. Robinson, 1893-1894 president - Newcastle Weekly Chronicle portrait - January 1894

Meetings were recorded at the hall of the Co-operative Stores and North of England Temperance League hall, both in Burnopfield, Friarside Chapel in Rowlands Gill and at the homes of those connected with the Club, such as Axwell House, then home to Sir Henry Clavering.

The founding members included: James F. Robinson (of Burnopfield), William Johnson (from Byermoor), Rev. Walker Featherstonhaugh (Rector of Edmundbyers) and James Johnson (Shotley Bridge)..

The Field Club was founded on egalitarian principles and some members were actively engaged in social improvement; for example William Johnson, a mine-worker, not only was a founder member of the Field Club, but also was instrumental in founding the Burnopfield Cooperative Society and its Education Committee as well as the Burnopfield St John Ambulance branch.

== Notable members ==
- Richard Siddoway Bagnall (Industrialist, entomologist, and president of the club in 1909-1911).
- T. Hudson Beare (Professor at the University of Edinburgh)
- Peter Phillips Bedson (Professor of Chemistry at Armstrong College, Durham)
- Horace St. John Kelly Donisthorpe
- E. Leonard Gill (Curator of the Hancock museum)
- George Alexander Louis Lebour (Professor of Geology at Durham College of Science)
- Marie Lebour (Marine biologist)
- Michael Cressé Potter (Professor of Botany at Armstrong College, Durham)
