= Atractothrips =

Scientific classification
- Kingdom: Animalia
- Phylum: Arthropoda
- Class: Insecta
- Order: Thysanoptera
- Family: Phlaeothripidae
- Genus: Atractothrips; Hood, 1938

Genus of thrips

Atractothrips is a genus of thrips in the family Phlaeothripidae.

== Species ==
- Atractothrips bradleyi
- Atractothrips mockfordi
