= Polytrichothrips =

Scientific classification
- Kingdom: Animalia
- Phylum: Arthropoda
- Class: Insecta
- Order: Thysanoptera
- Family: Phlaeothripidae
- Genus: Polytrichothrips; Priesner, 1939

Genus of thrips

Polytrichothrips is a genus of thrips in the family Phlaeothripidae.

== Species ==
- Polytrichothrips geoffri
- Polytrichothrips laticeps
