= Peter Phillips Bedson =

English chemistry professor

Peter Philips Bedson (1853-1943) was Professor of Chemistry at The College of Physical Science, Newcastle-upon-Tyne (later renamed Armstrong College, now Kings College) who worked on the humanitarian applications of chemistry to lead poisoning and the explosive properties of coal dust.

== Early life ==
Peter Philips Bedson was born in Manchester on 2nd April 1853; his father, George Bedson was the inventor of the continuous steel rolling mill in 1862. He was educated at Manchester Grammar School and Owens College, Manchester, where he worked under Henry Roscoe; he spent 1875 in London as a Dalton Scholar and then spent two years working with August Kekulé in the University of Bonn. He moved back to Owens College on the staff of Henry Roscoe for the years 1878-82.

== Academic career at Newcastle-upon-Tyne ==
In 1882, at the age of 29, he was appointed Professor of Chemistry at the College of Physical Science, Newcastle-upon-Tyne (later renamed Armstrong College, now Kings College) where he remained until his retirement in 1921. During this period, he abandoned study of pure chemistry to apply his talents to the application of chemistry for humanitarian purposes. He investigated the toxicology of White Lead in the context of workers in the local chemical industry. He was involved in analysing the gases associated with insanitary buildings. He is best known for his work on the explosive properties of coal dust, a topic of great concern to coal miners and the union leader John Forman. As well as his lectures at the college, he presented extramural lectures to: the National Registration of Plumbers, Colliery Managers, Mining Engineers and the general public. Along with his colleagues at the College of Physical Science : George Alexander Louis Lebour and Michael Cressé Potter, Bedson was an honorary member of the Vale of Derwent Naturalists' Field Club.

== Legacy ==
The Bedson Building of the University of Newcastle is named after him. His son, Sir Samuel Phillips Bedson FRS, was a British microbiologist. In 1933, a photograph of Bedson was acquired by the National Portrait Gallery, London. In 1937, the University of Durham conferred the honorary degree of D.C.L on Bedson.
