= Edwin Gill =

Edwin Gill may refer to:

- Edwin Leonard Gill (1877–1956), British ornithologist, taxidermist, and museum curator
- Edwin M. Gill (1899–1978), American politician in North Carolina
