= Saurothrips =

Scientific classification
- Kingdom: Animalia
- Phylum: Arthropoda
- Class: Insecta
- Order: Thysanoptera
- Family: Phlaeothripidae
- Genus: Saurothrips; Hood, 1952

Genus of thrips

Saurothrips is a genus of thrips in the family Phlaeothripidae.

== Species ==
- Saurothrips assai
