= Elaphrothrips tuberculatus =

Scientific classification
- Kingdom: Animalia
- Phylum: Arthropoda
- Class: Insecta
- Order: Thysanoptera
- Family: Phlaeothripidae
- Genus: Elaphrothrips
- Species: E. tuberculatus

Binomial name
- Elaphrothrips tuberculatus (Hood, 1908)

Species of thrip

Elaphrothrips tuberculatus is a species of tube-tailed thrips in the family Phlaeothripidae. It is found in North America.
