= Zeugmatothrips =

Scientific classification
- Kingdom: Animalia
- Phylum: Arthropoda
- Class: Insecta
- Order: Thysanoptera
- Family: Phlaeothripidae
- Genus: Zeugmatothrips; Priesner, 1925

Genus of thrips

Zeugmatothrips is a genus of thrips in the family Phlaeothripidae.

== Species ==
- Zeugmatothrips annulipes
- Zeugmatothrips badiicornis
- Zeugmatothrips badiipes
- Zeugmatothrips bennetti
- Zeugmatothrips bispinosus
- Zeugmatothrips borgmeieri
- Zeugmatothrips cinctus
- Zeugmatothrips femoralis
- Zeugmatothrips gerardoi
- Zeugmatothrips gracilis
- Zeugmatothrips hispidus
- Zeugmatothrips hoodi
- Zeugmatothrips mumbaca
- Zeugmatothrips niger
- Zeugmatothrips pallidulus
- Zeugmatothrips peltatus
- Zeugmatothrips priesneri
- Zeugmatothrips verae
