= Zeuglothrips =

Scientific classification
- Kingdom: Animalia
- Phylum: Arthropoda
- Class: Insecta
- Order: Thysanoptera
- Family: Phlaeothripidae
- Genus: Zeuglothrips; Hood, 1936

Genus of thrips

Zeuglothrips is a genus of thrips in the family Phlaeothripidae.

== Species ==
- Zeuglothrips echinus
