= Retithrips =

Scientific classification
- Kingdom: Animalia
- Phylum: Arthropoda
- Class: Insecta
- Order: Thysanoptera
- Family: Thripidae
- Subfamily: Panchaetothripinae
- Genus: Retithrips; Marchal, 1910

Genus of thrips

Retithrips is a genus of thrips in the family Thripidae, first described in 1910 by Paul Marchal. These thrips are leaf-feeding.

== Species ==
The IRMNG lists one species: Retithrips javanicus Karny, 1923, but GBIF also includes Retithrips syriacus (Mayet, 1890).
