= Mecynothrips =

Scientific classification
- Kingdom: Animalia
- Phylum: Arthropoda
- Class: Insecta
- Order: Thysanoptera
- Family: Phlaeothripidae
- Genus: Mecynothrips; Bagnall, 1908

Type species
- Mecynothrips wallacei Bagnall, 1908

Genus of thrips

Mecynothrips is a genus of thrips in the family Phlaeothripidae, first described by Richard Siddoway Bagnall in 1908. The type species is Mecynothrips wallacei Bagnall, 1908.

Two of the Australian species are found only in rainforests in northern Queensland (Mecynothrips acanthus, and Mecynothrips wallacei). but the third Australian species, M.hardyi lives on the dead leaves of Acacia harpophylla in arid parts of southern Queensland.

== Species ==
- Mecynothrips acanthus
- Mecynothrips atratus
- Mecynothrips goliath
- Mecynothrips hardyi
- Mecynothrips kanoi
- Mecynothrips karimonensis
- Mecynothrips kraussi
- Mecynothrips lacerta
- Mecynothrips priesneri
- Mecynothrips pugilator
- Mecynothrips simplex
- Mecynothrips snodgrassi
- Mecynothrips taiwanus
- Mecynothrips wallacei
