= Gynaikothrips =

Scientific classification
- Kingdom: Animalia
- Phylum: Arthropoda
- Clade: Pancrustacea
- Class: Insecta
- Order: Thysanoptera
- Family: Phlaeothripidae
- Subfamily: Phlaeothripinae
- Genus: Gynaikothrips; Zimmermann, 1900

Genus of thrips

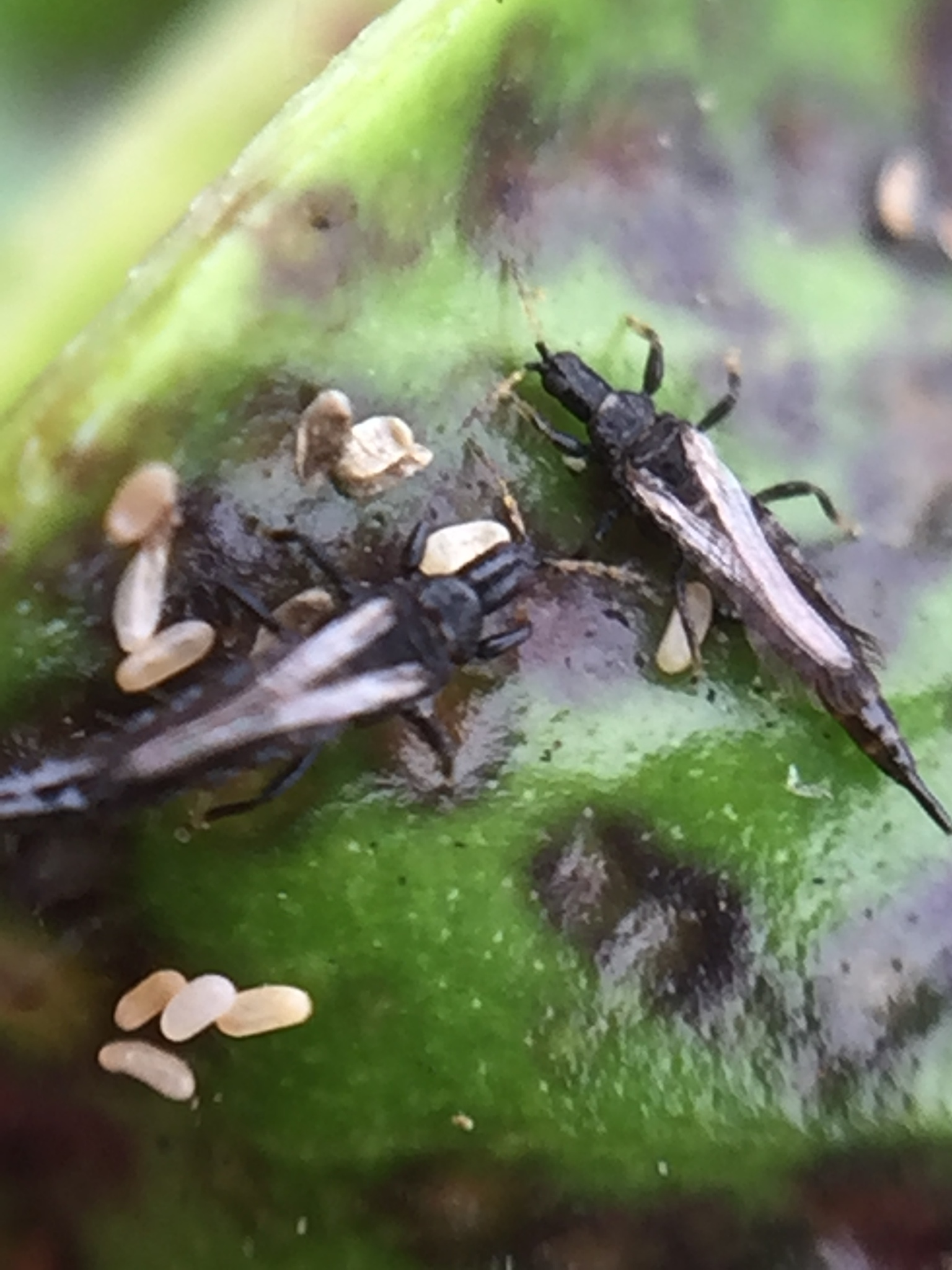
Gynaikothrips ficorum

Gynaikothrips is a genus of tube-tailed thrips in the family Phlaeothripidae. There are more than 30 described species in Gynaikothrips.

== Species ==
These 35 species belong to the genus Gynaikothrips:

- Gynaikothrips additamentus Karny
- Gynaikothrips australis Bagnall
- Gynaikothrips brevisetis Priesner
- Gynaikothrips chavicae Karny
- Gynaikothrips citricornis Moulton, 1928
- Gynaikothrips ebneri Karny, 1920
- Gynaikothrips ficorum (Marchal, 1908) (Cuban laurel thrips)
- Gynaikothrips fumipennis Karny
- Gynaikothrips fuscipes Karny, 1922
- Gynaikothrips garitacambroneroi Retana-Salazar, 2006
- Gynaikothrips gracilis Karny
- Gynaikothrips hirsutus
- Gynaikothrips hopkinsi Bagnall
- Gynaikothrips hystrix Bagnall
- Gynaikothrips imitans Karny
- Gynaikothrips imitator Ananthakrishnan
- Gynaikothrips insulsus Priesner, 1939
- Gynaikothrips karnyi Bagnall
- Gynaikothrips litoralis Karny
- Gynaikothrips longiceps Karny
- Gynaikothrips longicornis Karny, 1915
- Gynaikothrips luzonensis Priesner
- Gynaikothrips messuicola Bagnall
- Gynaikothrips mikaniae Priesner
- Gynaikothrips obscuripes Bagnall
- Gynaikothrips pallipes Karny
- Gynaikothrips piperis Priesner
- Gynaikothrips pontis Reyes, 1996
- Gynaikothrips satanas Priesner
- Gynaikothrips scotti Bagnall
- Gynaikothrips simillimus Karny, 1916
- Gynaikothrips sulcifrons Ananthakrishnan
- Gynaikothrips tristis Karny, 1915
- Gynaikothrips uzeli (Zimmermann, 1900)
- Gynaikothrips williamsi Karny
