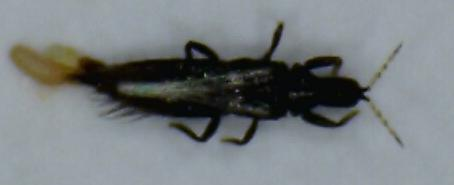
- A squashed Hoplandrothrips

Scientific classification
- Kingdom: Animalia
- Phylum: Arthropoda
- Clade: Pancrustacea
- Class: Insecta
- Order: Thysanoptera
- Family: Phlaeothripidae
- Subfamily: Phlaeothripinae
- Genus: Hoplandrothrips; Hood, 1912

= Hoplandrothrips =

Genus of thrips

Hoplandrothrips(commonly misspelled as Hoplandothrips) is a genus of thrips in the Phlaeothripidae family. Some species are recorded as pests on coffee growing in East Africa, causing a distinctive rolling of the leaf. The genus was first described in 1912 by J. Douglas Hood.

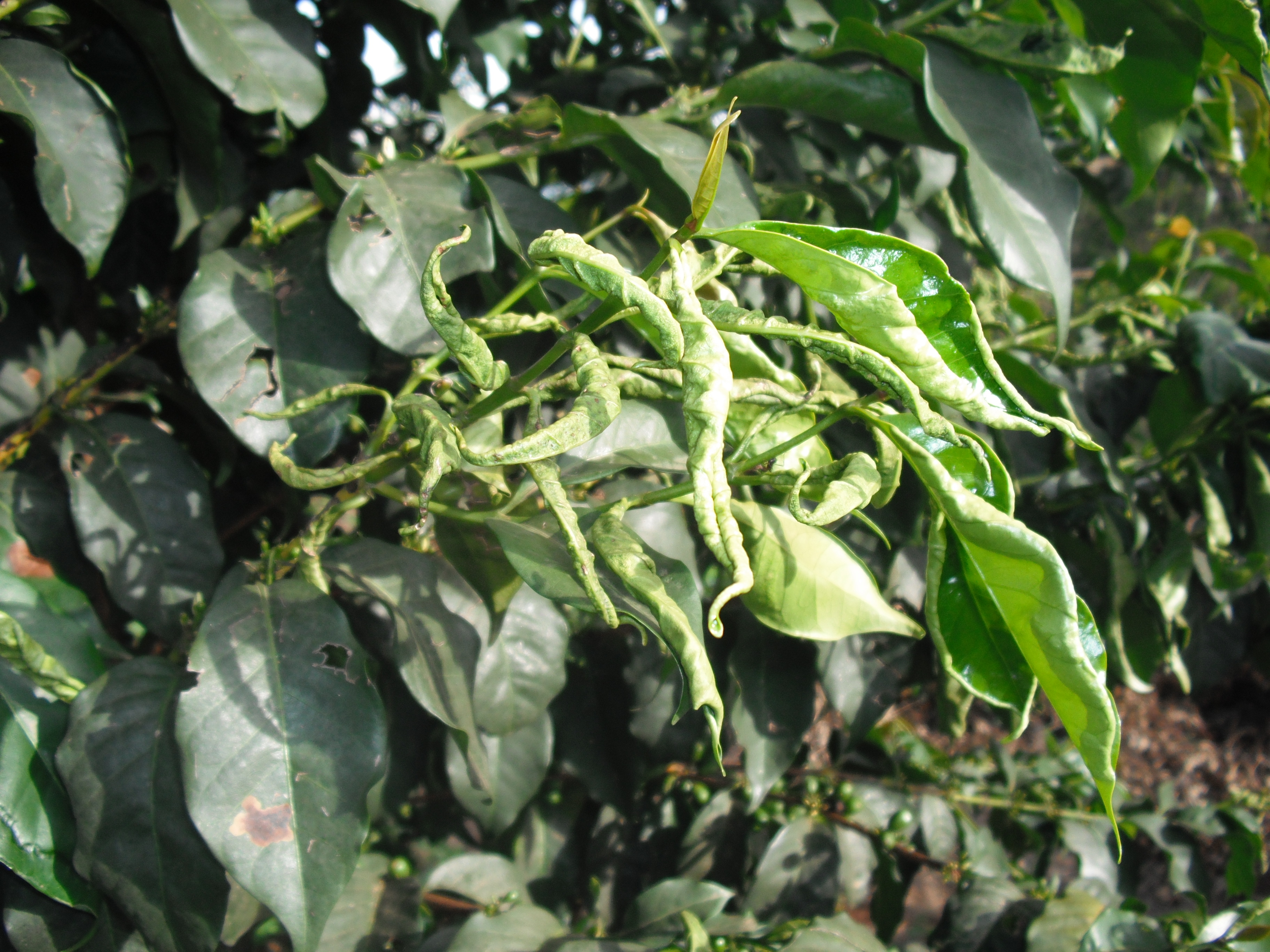
Leaves on a coffee tree that have rolled up due to Hoplandrothrips

== Description ==
Adults are dark brown and around 2 mm long and the larvae are pale yellow. In coffee, they feed on young leaves causing them to roll very tightly, reducing the photosynthetic area of the leaf. They tend to cause little loss in yield however compared to coffee berry borer and antestia bugs.

== Species ==
- Hoplandrothrips abrasi
- Hoplandrothrips acaciae
- Hoplandrothrips affinis
- Hoplandrothrips albipes
- Hoplandrothrips angulosus
- Hoplandrothrips angustatus
- Hoplandrothrips approximatus
- Hoplandrothrips armiger
- Hoplandrothrips arrhenus
- Hoplandrothrips bartlei
- Hoplandrothrips bellicosus
- Hoplandrothrips bidens _{Bagnall, 1910}
- Hoplandrothrips bournieri
- Hoplandrothrips brasiliensis
- Hoplandrothrips bredoi _{Praisner} - a minor pest of coffee in the Democratic Republic of Congo
- Hoplandrothrips brunneicinctus
- Hoplandrothrips brunneicornis
- Hoplandrothrips casamancae
- Hoplandrothrips caudatus
- Hoplandrothrips chapmani
- Hoplandrothrips choritus _{Mound & Walker, 1986}
- Hoplandrothrips coffeae _{Bagnall} - a minor pest of coffee in western Tanzania
- Hoplandrothrips coloratus
- Hoplandrothrips consobrinus
- Hoplandrothrips cooperi
- Hoplandrothrips coorongi
- Hoplandrothrips corticis
- Hoplandrothrips costano
- Hoplandrothrips cubicola
- Hoplandrothrips edentatus
- Hoplandrothrips ellisi
- Hoplandrothrips elongatus
- Hoplandrothrips erythrinae
- Hoplandrothrips esakii
- Hoplandrothrips famelicus
- Hoplandrothrips fasciatus
- Hoplandrothrips flavidus
- Hoplandrothrips flavipes
- Hoplandrothrips forbesi
- Hoplandrothrips fusciflavus
- Hoplandrothrips fuscus
- Hoplandrothrips gloriosi
- Hoplandrothrips gynandrus
- Hoplandrothrips hemiflavus
- Hoplandrothrips hesperidum
- Hoplandrothrips honestus
- Hoplandrothrips hoodi
- Hoplandrothrips horridus
- Hoplandrothrips howei
- Hoplandrothrips huastecus
- Hoplandrothrips hungaricus
- Hoplandrothrips hylaius
- Hoplandrothrips hystrix
- Hoplandrothrips ibisci
- Hoplandrothrips ingenuus _{Mound & Walker, 1986}
- Hoplandrothrips insolens
- Hoplandrothrips irretius
- Hoplandrothrips jasmini
- Hoplandrothrips jennei
- Hoplandrothrips jennyae
- Hoplandrothrips juniperinus
- Hoplandrothrips kudoi
- Hoplandrothrips landolphiae
- Hoplandrothrips leai
- Hoplandrothrips lepidus
- Hoplandrothrips lissonotus
- Hoplandrothrips longirostris
- Hoplandrothrips maderensis
- Hoplandrothrips marshalli _{Karny} - a moderate pest of coffee in the Democratic Republic of Congo and Uganda.
- Hoplandrothrips mcateei
- Hoplandrothrips microps
- Hoplandrothrips nasutus
- Hoplandrothrips neovulcaniensis
- Hoplandrothrips nigricestus _{Hood, 1934}
- Hoplandrothrips nipponicus
- Hoplandrothrips nobilis
- Hoplandrothrips nonakai
- Hoplandrothrips obesametae
- Hoplandrothrips ochraceus
- Hoplandrothrips olmecanus
- Hoplandrothrips ommatus
- Hoplandrothrips oreillyi
- Hoplandrothrips orientalis
- Hoplandrothrips pallens
- Hoplandrothrips palmerae
- Hoplandrothrips parvus
- Hoplandrothrips pergandei
- Hoplandrothrips picticornis
- Hoplandrothrips priesneri
- Hoplandrothrips proteus
- Hoplandrothrips quadriconus
- Hoplandrothrips quercuspumilae
- Hoplandrothrips raptor
- Hoplandrothrips russelli
- Hoplandrothrips rusticus
- Hoplandrothrips ryukyuensis
- Hoplandrothrips salicacearum
- Hoplandrothrips schoutedeni
- Hoplandrothrips scutellaris
- Hoplandrothrips sides
- Hoplandrothrips symmetricus
- Hoplandrothrips tarascus
- Hoplandrothrips tareei
- Hoplandrothrips tristissimus
- Hoplandrothrips trucatoapicus
- Hoplandrothrips trybomi
- Hoplandrothrips tumiceps
- Hoplandrothrips ugandensis
- Hoplandrothrips uzeli
- Hoplandrothrips vansoni
- Hoplandrothrips variegatus
- Hoplandrothrips vazquezae
- Hoplandrothrips vernus _{Mound & Walker, 1986}
- Hoplandrothrips virago
- Hoplandrothrips williamsianus
- Hoplandrothrips xanthocnemis
- Hoplandrothrips xanthopoides _{Bagnall, 1917}
