= Acallurothrips =

Scientific classification
- Kingdom: Animalia
- Phylum: Arthropoda
- Class: Insecta
- Order: Thysanoptera
- Family: Phlaeothripidae
- Subfamily: Idolothripinae
- Genus: Acallurothrips; Bagnall, 1921

Genus of thrips

Acallurothrips is a genus of thrips in the family Phlaeothripidae.

== Species ==
- Acallurothrips amplus
- Acallurothrips badius
- Acallurothrips breviceps
- Acallurothrips brunneus
- Acallurothrips casuarinae
- Acallurothrips conifer
- Acallurothrips fasciolatus
- Acallurothrips flavus
- Acallurothrips hagai
- Acallurothrips hanatanii
- Acallurothrips judithae
- Acallurothrips latus
- Acallurothrips louisianae
- Acallurothrips macrurus
- Acallurothrips mamillicauda
- Acallurothrips metulicauda
- Acallurothrips nogutti
- Acallurothrips nonakai
- Acallurothrips quadraticeps
- Acallurothrips spinicauda
- Acallurothrips spinurus
- Acallurothrips tubullatus
