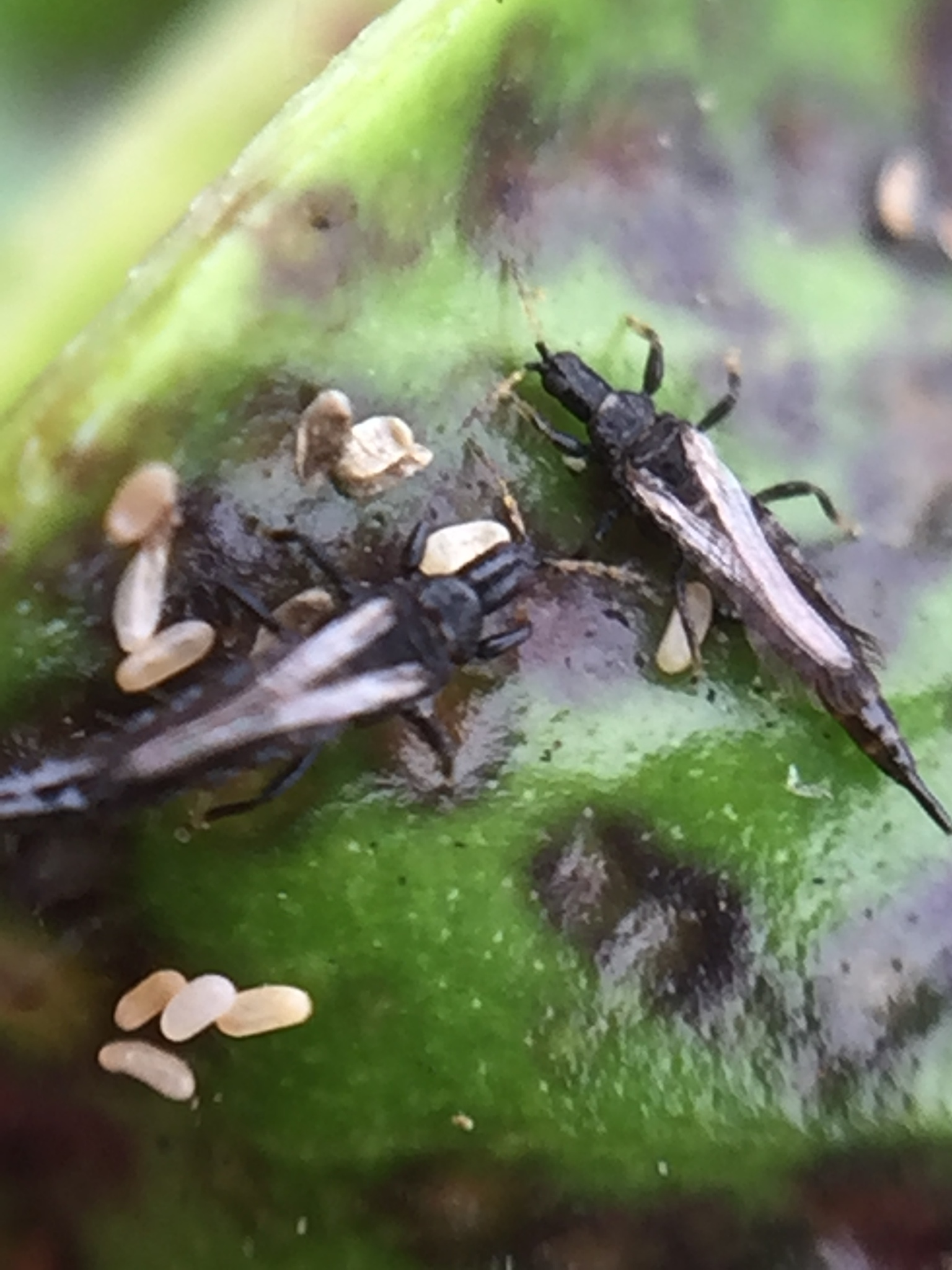

Scientific classification
- Kingdom: Animalia
- Phylum: Arthropoda
- Class: Insecta
- Order: Thysanoptera
- Family: Phlaeothripidae
- Genus: Gynaikothrips
- Species: G. ficorum

Binomial name
- Gynaikothrips ficorum (Marchal, 1908)

= Gynaikothrips ficorum =

Species of thrip

Gynaikothrips ficorum, the Cuban laurel thrips, is a species of tube-tailed thrips in the family Phlaeothripidae. It is found in Africa, North America, and Europe. It is widespread around the world because of its host plant, Ficus.

It was first described by Paul Marchal in 1908 as Phloeothrips ficorum.

In Australia, where it is known as the fig leaf-rolling thrips, it has been found in New South Wales, the Northern Territory, Queensland, and Western Australia.
