= Dichaetothrips =

Scientific classification
- Kingdom: Animalia
- Phylum: Arthropoda
- Class: Insecta
- Order: Thysanoptera
- Family: Phlaeothripidae
- Genus: Dichaetothrips; Hood, 1914

Genus of thrips

Dichaetothrips is a genus of thrips in the family Phlaeothripidae.

== Species ==
- Dichaetothrips brevicollis
- Dichaetothrips okajimai
- Dichaetothrips secutor
- Dichaetothrips senohi
