= NSJ =

NSJ may refer to:

- National Unity (Czech Republic), a Czech nationalist party
- Nevus sebaceous, a medical condition
- National Scout jamboree (Boy Scouts of America), an irregularly recurring event
- North San Jose, a neighborhood of San Jose, California, United States
- North State Journal, a statewide newspaper in North Carolina
- Nebraska State Journal, a former newspaper from 1857 to 1951
- Actinothrips, a genus of thrip insects, by Catalog of Life identifier
