= Diplacothrips =

Scientific classification
- Kingdom: Animalia
- Phylum: Arthropoda
- Class: Insecta
- Order: Thysanoptera
- Family: Phlaeothripidae
- Genus: Diplacothrips; Hood, 1937

Genus of thrips

Diplacothrips is a genus of thrips in the family Phlaeothripidae.

== Species ==
- Diplacothrips borgmeieri
- Diplacothrips piceus
