= Tiarothrips =

Scientific classification
- Kingdom: Animalia
- Phylum: Arthropoda
- Class: Insecta
- Order: Thysanoptera
- Family: Phlaeothripidae
- Genus: Tiarothrips; Priesner, 1935

Genus of thrips

Tiarothrips is a genus of thrips in the family Phlaeothripidae.

== Species ==
- Tiarothrips subramanii
