= Machatothrips =

Scientific classification
- Kingdom: Animalia
- Phylum: Arthropoda
- Class: Insecta
- Order: Thysanoptera
- Family: Phlaeothripidae
- Genus: Machatothrips (Bagnall, 1908)

Genus of thrips

Machatothrips is a genus of thrips in the family Phlaeothripidae.

== Species ==
- Machatothrips antennatus
- Machatothrips artocarpi
- Machatothrips biuncinatus
- Machatothrips braueri
- Machatothrips celosia
- Machatothrips corticosus
- Machatothrips decorus
- Machatothrips diabolus
- Machatothrips haplodon
- Machatothrips heveae
- Machatothrips indicus
- Machatothrips lentus
- Machatothrips quadrudentatus
- Machatothrips silvaticus
