= Habrothrips =

Scientific classification
- Kingdom: Animalia
- Phylum: Arthropoda
- Class: Insecta
- Order: Thysanoptera
- Family: Phlaeothripidae
- Genus: Habrothrips; Ananthakrishnan, 1968

Genus of thrips

Habrothrips is a genus of thrips in the family Phlaeothripidae.

== Species ==
- Habrothrips curiosus
