= Ethirothrips =

Scientific classification
- Kingdom: Animalia
- Phylum: Arthropoda
- Class: Insecta
- Order: Thysanoptera
- Family: Phlaeothripidae
- Genus: Ethirothrips; Karny, 1925

Genus of thrips

Ethirothrips is a genus of thrips in the family Phlaeothripidae, first described by Heinrich Hugo Karny in 1925.

== Species ==
- Ethirothrips acanthus
- Ethirothrips adventor
- Ethirothrips agasthya
- Ethirothrips anacardii
- Ethirothrips angusticornis
- Ethirothrips antennalis
- Ethirothrips australiensis
- Ethirothrips barretti
- Ethirothrips beesoni
- Ethirothrips boninensis
- Ethirothrips brevis
- Ethirothrips brevisetosus
- Ethirothrips chui
- Ethirothrips distasmus
- Ethirothrips dracon
- Ethirothrips elephas
- Ethirothrips fijiensis
- Ethirothrips firmus
- Ethirothrips giraulti
- Ethirothrips indicola
- Ethirothrips indicus
- Ethirothrips inermis
- Ethirothrips io
- Ethirothrips latapennis
- Ethirothrips longisetis
- Ethirothrips madagascariensis
- Ethirothrips meridionalis
- Ethirothrips nigrescens
- Ethirothrips obscurus
- Ethirothrips stenomelas
- Ethirothrips sybarita
- Ethirothrips tibialis
- Ethirothrips tirumalaiensis
- Ethirothrips uredinis
- Ethirothrips virgulae
- Ethirothrips vitreipennis
- Ethirothrips watsoni
