= Heptathrips =

Scientific classification
- Kingdom: Animalia
- Phylum: Arthropoda
- Class: Insecta
- Order: Thysanoptera
- Family: Phlaeothripidae
- Genus: Heptathrips; Moulton, 1942

Genus of thrips

Heptathrips is a genus of thrips in the family Phlaeothripidae.

== Species ==
- Heptathrips africanus
- Heptathrips cottieri
- Heptathrips cumberi
- Heptathrips kuscheli
- Heptathrips magnifica
- Heptathrips ruficaudis
- Heptathrips tillyardi
- Heptathrips tonnoiri
