= Azeugmatothrips =

Scientific classification
- Kingdom: Animalia
- Phylum: Arthropoda
- Class: Insecta
- Order: Thysanoptera
- Family: Phlaeothripidae
- Genus: Azeugmatothrips; Mound & Palmer, 1983

Genus of thrips

Azeugmatothrips is a genus of thrips in the family Phlaeothripidae, first described by Laurence Mound and Palmer in 1983. The holotype for A. obrieni was collected in Panama, that for A. rectus in Trinidad.

== Species ==
Listed at GBIF and IRMNG:

- Azeugmatothrips obrieni
- Azeugmatothrips rectus
