= Allothrips =

Scientific classification
- Kingdom: Animalia
- Phylum: Arthropoda
- Class: Insecta
- Order: Thysanoptera
- Family: Phlaeothripidae
- Genus: Allothrips; Hood, 1908

Genus of thrips

Allothrips is a genus of thrips in the family Phlaeothripidae.

== Species ==
- Allothrips acaciae
- Allothrips acutus
- Allothrips africanus
- Allothrips aureus
- Allothrips bicolor
- Allothrips biminianus
- Allothrips bournieri
- Allothrips brasilianus
- Allothrips coanosetosus
- Allothrips discolor
- Allothrips expansus
- Allothrips greensladei
- Allothrips hamideae
- Allothrips indicus
- Allothrips magnus
- Allothrips megacephalus
- Allothrips mexicanus
- Allothrips montanus
- Allothrips nubillicauda
- Allothrips pillichellus
- Allothrips prolixus
- Allothrips stannardi
- Allothrips taiwanus
- Allothrips watsoni
