= Cylindrothrips =

Scientific classification
- Kingdom: Animalia
- Phylum: Arthropoda
- Class: Insecta
- Order: Thysanoptera
- Family: Phlaeothripidae
- Genus: Cylindrothrips; Moulton, 1949

Genus of thrips

Cylindrothrips is a genus of thrips in the family Phlaeothripidae.

== Species ==
- Cylindrothrips niger
