= Elgonima =

Elgonima seticeps

Scientific classification
- Kingdom: Animalia
- Phylum: Arthropoda
- Class: Insecta
- Order: Thysanoptera
- Family: Phlaeothripidae
- Genus: Elgonima zur Strassen, 1972
- Species: E. seticeps

Binomial name
- Elgonima seticeps zur Strassen, 1972

Genus of thrips

Elgonima is a genus of thrips in the family Phlaeothripidae. It has a single species, Elgonima seticeps.
