= Aesthesiothrips =

Scientific classification
- Kingdom: Animalia
- Phylum: Arthropoda
- Class: Insecta
- Order: Thysanoptera
- Family: Phlaeothripidae
- Genus: Aesthesiothrips; Ananthakrishnan, 1961

Genus of thrips

Aesthesiothrips is a genus of thrips in the family Phlaeothripidae.

== Species ==
- Aesthesiothrips jatrophae
