= Diaphorothrips =

Scientific classification
- Kingdom: Animalia
- Phylum: Arthropoda
- Class: Insecta
- Order: Thysanoptera
- Family: Phlaeothripidae
- Genus: Diaphorothrips; Karny, 1920

Genus of thrips

Diaphorothrips is a genus of thrips in the family Phlaeothripidae.

== Species ==
- Diaphorothrips clavipes
- Diaphorothrips hamipes
- Diaphorothrips kraussi
- Diaphorothrips pugnator
- Diaphorothrips unguipes
