= Hartwigia =

Scientific classification
- Kingdom: Animalia
- Phylum: Arthropoda
- Class: Insecta
- Order: Thysanoptera
- Family: Phlaeothripidae
- Genus: Hartwigia; Faure, 1949

Genus of thrips

Hartwigia is a genus of thrips in the family Phlaeothripidae.

== Species ==
- Hartwigia tumiceps
