= Bolothrips =

Scientific classification
- Kingdom: Animalia
- Phylum: Arthropoda
- Class: Insecta
- Order: Thysanoptera
- Family: Phlaeothripidae
- Genus: Bolothrips; Priesner, 1926

Genus of thrips

Bolothrips is a genus of thrips in the family Phlaeothripidae.

== Species ==
- Bolothrips africanus
- Bolothrips bicolor
- Bolothrips cinctus
- Bolothrips cingulatus
- Bolothrips dentipes
- Bolothrips dentis
- Bolothrips embotyi
- Bolothrips gilvipes
- Bolothrips icarus
- Bolothrips inaccessiblensis
- Bolothrips insularis
- Bolothrips italicus
- Bolothrips moundi
- Bolothrips pratensis
- Bolothrips rachiphilus
- Bolothrips schaferi
- Bolothrips varius
