= Cryptothrips =

Scientific classification
- Kingdom: Animalia
- Phylum: Arthropoda
- Class: Insecta
- Order: Thysanoptera
- Family: Phlaeothripidae
- Genus: Cryptothrips; Uzel, 1895

Genus of thrips

Cryptothrips is a genus of thrips in the family Phlaeothripidae.

== Species ==
- Cryptothrips amneius
- Cryptothrips angustus
- Cryptothrips bursarius
- Cryptothrips carbonarius
- Cryptothrips flavus
- Cryptothrips maritimus
- Cryptothrips nigripes
- Cryptothrips okiwiensis
- Cryptothrips pusillus
- Cryptothrips rectangularis
- Cryptothrips sauteri
- Cryptothrips sordidatus
