= Herathrips =

Scientific classification
- Kingdom: Animalia
- Phylum: Arthropoda
- Class: Insecta
- Order: Thysanoptera
- Family: Phlaeothripidae
- Genus: Herathrips; Mound, 1974

Genus of thrips

Herathrips is a genus of thrips in the family Phlaeothripidae.

== Species ==
- Herathrips nativus
