= Carientothrips =

Scientific classification
- Kingdom: Animalia
- Phylum: Arthropoda
- Class: Insecta
- Order: Thysanoptera
- Family: Phlaeothripidae
- Genus: Carientothrips; Moulton, 1944

Genus of thrips

Carientothrips is a genus of thrips in the family Phlaeothripidae.

== Species ==
- Carientothrips acti
- Carientothrips alienatus
- Carientothrips biformis
- Carientothrips calami
- Carientothrips casuarinae
- Carientothrips denticulatus
- Carientothrips fijiensis
- Carientothrips flavitibia
- Carientothrips grayi
- Carientothrips horni
- Carientothrips japonicus
- Carientothrips loisthus
- Carientothrips magnetis
- Carientothrips miskoi
- Carientothrips mjobergi
- Carientothrips palumai
- Carientothrips pedicillus
- Carientothrips pictilis
- Carientothrips reedi
- Carientothrips semirufus
- Carientothrips snowi
- Carientothrips tasmanica
- Carientothrips vesper
