= Ophthalmothrips =

Scientific classification
- Kingdom: Animalia
- Phylum: Arthropoda
- Class: Insecta
- Order: Thysanoptera
- Family: Phlaeothripidae
- Genus: Ophthalmothrips; Hood, 1919

Genus of thrips

Ophthalmothrips is a genus of thrips in the family Phlaeothripidae.

== Species ==
- Ophthalmothrips amyae
- Ophthalmothrips breviceps
- Ophthalmothrips conocephalus
- Ophthalmothrips faurei
- Ophthalmothrips formosanus
- Ophthalmothrips lesnei
- Ophthalmothrips longiceps
- Ophthalmothrips miscanthicola
- Ophthalmothrips pomeroyi
- Ophthalmothrips yunnanensis
