= Holurothrips =

Scientific classification
- Kingdom: Animalia
- Phylum: Arthropoda
- Class: Insecta
- Order: Thysanoptera
- Family: Phlaeothripidae
- Genus: Holurothrips; Bagnall, 1914

Genus of thrips

Holurothrips is a genus of thrips in the family Phlaeothripidae.

== Species ==
- Holurothrips collessi
- Holurothrips manipurensis
- Holurothrips morikawai
- Holurothrips ornatus
