= Megalothrips =

Scientific classification
- Kingdom: Animalia
- Phylum: Arthropoda
- Class: Insecta
- Order: Thysanoptera
- Family: Phlaeothripidae
- Genus: Megalothrips; Uzel, 1895

Genus of thrips

Megalothrips is a genus of thrips in the family Phlaeothripidae.

== Species ==
- Megalothrips andrei
- Megalothrips bonannii
- Megalothrips curvidens
- Megalothrips delmasi
- Megalothrips picticornis
- Megalothrips roundus
- Megalothrips schuhi
- Megalothrips spinosus
