= Bacillothrips =

Scientific classification
- Kingdom: Animalia
- Phylum: Arthropoda
- Class: Insecta
- Order: Thysanoptera
- Family: Phlaeothripidae
- Genus: Bacillothrips; Buffa, 1908

Genus of thrips

Bacillothrips is a genus of thrips in the family Phlaeothripidae.

== Species ==
- Bacillothrips bagnalli
- Bacillothrips longiceps
- Bacillothrips nobilis
