= Tarassothrips =

Scientific classification
- Kingdom: Animalia
- Phylum: Arthropoda
- Class: Insecta
- Order: Thysanoptera
- Family: Phlaeothripidae
- Genus: Tarassothrips; Mound & Palmer, 1983

Genus of thrips

Tarassothrips is a genus of thrips in the family Phlaeothripidae.

== Species ==
- Tarassothrips akritus
- Tarassothrips grandis
