= Emprosthiothrips =

Scientific classification
- Kingdom: Animalia
- Phylum: Arthropoda
- Class: Insecta
- Order: Thysanoptera
- Family: Phlaeothripidae
- Genus: Emprosthiothrips; Moulton, 1942

Genus of thrips

Emprosthiothrips is a genus of thrips in the family Phlaeothripidae.

== Species ==
- Emprosthiothrips bogong
- Emprosthiothrips brimblecombei
- Emprosthiothrips brittoni
- Emprosthiothrips csiro
- Emprosthiothrips epallelus
- Emprosthiothrips niger
