= Diceratothrips =

Scientific classification
- Kingdom: Animalia
- Phylum: Arthropoda
- Class: Insecta
- Order: Thysanoptera
- Family: Phlaeothripidae
- Genus: Diceratothrips; Bagnall, 1908

Genus of thrips

Diceratothrips is a genus of thrips in the family Phlaeothripidae.

== Species ==
- Diceratothrips bennetti
- Diceratothrips bicornis
- Diceratothrips cornutus
- Diceratothrips cubensis
- Diceratothrips delicatus
- Diceratothrips garciaamaroae
- Diceratothrips harti
- Diceratothrips horridus
- Diceratothrips inferorum
- Diceratothrips longipes
- Diceratothrips nigricauda
- Diceratothrips obscuricornis
- Diceratothrips pallidior
- Diceratothrips picticornis
- Diceratothrips robustus
- Diceratothrips sakimurai
- Diceratothrips setigenis
- Diceratothrips validipennis
