= Selenothrips =

Scientific classification
- Kingdom: Animalia
- Phylum: Arthropoda
- Class: Insecta
- Order: Thysanoptera
- Family: Thripidae
- Subfamily: Panchaetothripinae
- Genus: Selenothrips; Karny, 1911

Genus of thrips

Selenothrips is a genus of thrips in the family Thripidae, first described in 1911 by Heinrich Hugo Karny. There are at least two described species in Selenothrips.

== Species ==
These two species belong to the genus Selenothrips:

- Selenothrips glabratus Priesner, 1927
- Selenothrips rubrocinctus (Giard, 1901) (red-banded thrips)
