= Malesiathrips =

Scientific classification
- Kingdom: Animalia
- Phylum: Arthropoda
- Class: Insecta
- Order: Thysanoptera
- Family: Phlaeothripidae
- Genus: Malesiathrips; Palmer & Mound, 1978

Genus of thrips

Malesiathrips is a genus of thrips in the family Phlaeothripidae. Species of the genus are found in Malaysia, Guam, Solomon Islands and northern Queensland, Australia.

== Species ==
- Malesiathrips australis
- Malesiathrips guamensis
- Malesiathrips malayensis
- Malesiathrips solomoni
