= Neosmerinthothrips =

Scientific classification
- Kingdom: Animalia
- Phylum: Arthropoda
- Class: Insecta
- Order: Thysanoptera
- Family: Phlaeothripidae
- Genus: Neosmerinthothrips; Schmutz, 1913

Genus of thrips

Neosmerinthothrips is a genus of thrips in the family Phlaeothripidae.

== Species ==
- Neosmerinthothrips affinis
- Neosmerinthothrips annulipes
- Neosmerinthothrips brevicollis
- Neosmerinthothrips collaris
- Neosmerinthothrips diversicolor
- Neosmerinthothrips fijiensis
- Neosmerinthothrips fructuum
- Neosmerinthothrips grandicauda
- Neosmerinthothrips hamiltoni
- Neosmerinthothrips hilaris
- Neosmerinthothrips hoodi
- Neosmerinthothrips inquilinus
- Neosmerinthothrips insularis
- Neosmerinthothrips nigrisetis
- Neosmerinthothrips parvidens
- Neosmerinthothrips paulistarum
- Neosmerinthothrips picticornis
- Neosmerinthothrips plaumanni
- Neosmerinthothrips robustus
- Neosmerinthothrips variipes
- Neosmerinthothrips xylebori
