= Hybridothrips =

Scientific classification
- Kingdom: Animalia
- Phylum: Arthropoda
- Class: Insecta
- Order: Thysanoptera
- Family: Phlaeothripidae
- Genus: Hybridothrips; Stannard, 1955

Genus of thrips

Hybridothrips is a genus of thrips in the family Phlaeothripidae.

== Species ==
- Hybridothrips oneillae
