= Priesneriella =

Scientific classification
- Kingdom: Animalia
- Phylum: Arthropoda
- Class: Insecta
- Order: Thysanoptera
- Family: Phlaeothripidae
- Genus: Priesneriella; Hood, 1927

Genus of thrips

Priesneriella is a genus of thrips in the family Phlaeothripidae.

== Species ==
Additional information needed

- Priesneriella citricauda
- Priesneriella clavicornis
- Priesneriella gnomus
- Priesneriella luctator
- Priesneriella mavromoustakisi
- Priesneriella seminole
- Priesneriella thomasi
- Priesneriella tubversicolor
- Priesneriella vercambrei
