= Nesothrips =

Scientific classification
- Kingdom: Animalia
- Phylum: Arthropoda
- Class: Insecta
- Order: Thysanoptera
- Family: Phlaeothripidae
- Genus: Nesothrips; Kirkaldy, 1907

Genus of thrips

Nesothrips is a genus of thrips in the family Phlaeothripidae.

== Species ==
- Nesothrips alexandrae
- Nesothrips aoristus
- Nesothrips artocarpi
- Nesothrips badius
- Nesothrips barrowi
- Nesothrips brevicollis
- Nesothrips brigalowi
- Nesothrips capricornis
- Nesothrips carveri
- Nesothrips coorongi
- Nesothrips doulli
- Nesothrips eastopi
- Nesothrips fodinae
- Nesothrips hemidiscus
- Nesothrips lativentris
- Nesothrips leveri
- Nesothrips major
- Nesothrips malaccae
- Nesothrips minor
- Nesothrips niger
- Nesothrips nigrisetis
- Nesothrips oahuensis
- Nesothrips peltatus
- Nesothrips pintadus
- Nesothrips propinquus
- Nesothrips rangi
- Nesothrips rossi
- Nesothrips semiflavus
- Nesothrips yanchepi
- Nesothrips yasumatsui
- Nesothrips zondagi
