= Allopisothrips =

Scientific classification
- Kingdom: Animalia
- Phylum: Arthropoda
- Class: Insecta
- Order: Thysanoptera
- Family: Phlaeothripidae
- Genus: Allopisothrips; Sakimura & Bianchi, 1977

Genus of thrips

Allopisothrips is a genus of thrips in the family Phlaeothripidae.

== Species ==
- Allopisothrips alakaiensis
