= Anactinothrips =

Scientific classification
- Kingdom: Animalia
- Phylum: Arthropoda
- Class: Insecta
- Order: Thysanoptera
- Family: Phlaeothripidae
- Genus: Anactinothrips; Bagnall, 1909

Genus of thrips

Anactinothrips is a genus of thrips in the family Phlaeothripidae.

== Species ==
- Anactinothrips antennatus
- Anactinothrips brachyura
- Anactinothrips cristatus
- Anactinothrips davidi
- Anactinothrips distinguendus
- Anactinothrips fuscus
- Anactinothrips gibbifer
- Anactinothrips graphidura
- Anactinothrips gustaviae
- Anactinothrips handlirschii
- Anactinothrips longisetis
- Anactinothrips marginipennis
- Anactinothrips meinerti
- Anactinothrips nigricornis
- Anactinothrips silvicola
