= Campulothrips =

Scientific classification
- Kingdom: Animalia
- Phylum: Arthropoda
- Class: Insecta
- Order: Thysanoptera
- Family: Phlaeothripidae
- Genus: Campulothrips; Moulton, 1944

Genus of thrips

Campulothrips is a genus of thrips in the family Phlaeothripidae.

== Species ==
- Campulothrips gracilis
