= Allidothrips =

Scientific classification
- Kingdom: Animalia
- Phylum: Arthropoda
- Class: Insecta
- Order: Thysanoptera
- Family: Phlaeothripidae
- Genus: Allidothrips zur Strassen, 1986

Genus of thrips

Allidothrips is a genus of thrips in the family Phlaeothripidae.

== Species ==
- Allidothrips cinctus
- Allidothrips tricolor
