= Compsothrips =

Scientific classification
- Kingdom: Animalia
- Phylum: Arthropoda
- Class: Insecta
- Order: Thysanoptera
- Family: Phlaeothripidae
- Genus: Compsothrips; Reuter, 1901

Genus of thrips

Compsothrips is a genus of thrips in the family Phlaeothripidae.

== Species ==
- Compsothrips aeneus
- Compsothrips albosignatus
- Compsothrips baileyi
- Compsothrips bicolor
- Compsothrips brasiliensis
- Compsothrips brunneus
- Compsothrips congoensis
- Compsothrips dampfi
- Compsothrips graminis
- Compsothrips hoodi
- Compsothrips hookeri
- Compsothrips jacksoni
- Compsothrips maroccanus
- Compsothrips oneillae
- Compsothrips pampicolla
- Compsothrips querci
- Compsothrips ramamurthii
- Compsothrips reticulates
- Compsothrips reuteri
- Compsothrips sinensis
- Compsothrips sumatranus
- Compsothrips tenebronus
- Compsothrips timur
- Compsothrips tristis
- Compsothrips uzeli
- Compsothrips walteri
- Compsothrips yosemitae
