= Gastrothrips =

Scientific classification
- Kingdom: Animalia
- Phylum: Arthropoda
- Class: Insecta
- Order: Thysanoptera
- Family: Phlaeothripidae
- Genus: Gastrothrips; Hood, 1912

Genus of thrips

Gastrothrips is a genus of thrips in the family Phlaeothripidae.

== Species ==
- Gastrothrips abditus
- Gastrothrips acuticornis
- Gastrothrips acutulus
- Gastrothrips alticola
- Gastrothrips anahuacensis
- Gastrothrips anolis
- Gastrothrips callipus
- Gastrothrips citriceps
- Gastrothrips corvus
- Gastrothrips curvidens
- Gastrothrips eurypelta
- Gastrothrips falcatus
- Gastrothrips fulvicauda
- Gastrothrips fulviceps
- Gastrothrips fumipennis
- Gastrothrips fuscatus
- Gastrothrips harti
- Gastrothrips heterocerus
- Gastrothrips intonsus
- Gastrothrips jalisciensis
- Gastrothrips mandiocae
- Gastrothrips mauli
- Gastrothrips mongolicus
- Gastrothrips monticola
- Gastrothrips procerus
- Gastrothrips proturus
- Gastrothrips pueblae
- Gastrothrips ruficauda
- Gastrothrips saetiger
- Gastrothrips stygicus
- Gastrothrips subulatus
- Gastrothrips tenuipennis
- Gastrothrips terrestris
- Gastrothrips texanus
- Gastrothrips timidus
- Gastrothrips turbinatus
- Gastrothrips xosa
