= Dinothrips =

Scientific classification
- Kingdom: Animalia
- Phylum: Arthropoda
- Class: Insecta
- Order: Thysanoptera
- Family: Phlaeothripidae
- Genus: Dinothrips; Bagnall, 1908

Genus of thrips

Dinothrips is a genus of thrips in the family Phlaeothripidae.

== Species ==
- Dinothrips hainanensis
- Dinothrips juglandis
- Dinothrips longicauda
- Dinothrips monodon
- Dinothrips spinosus
- Dinothrips sumatrensis
