= Pygothrips =

Scientific classification
- Kingdom: Animalia
- Phylum: Arthropoda
- Class: Insecta
- Order: Thysanoptera
- Family: Phlaeothripidae
- Genus: Pygothrips; Hood, 1915

Genus of thrips

Pygothrips is a genus of thrips in the family Phlaeothripidae.

== Species ==
- Pygothrips albiceps
- Pygothrips brevis
- Pygothrips callipygus
- Pygothrips flavomaculatus
- Pygothrips fortis
- Pygothrips fusculus
- Pygothrips longiceps
- Pygothrips magnicauda
- Pygothrips mikrommatos
- Pygothrips needhami
- Pygothrips postocellaris
- Pygothrips pygus
- Pygothrips rugicauda
- Pygothrips sculpticauda
- Pygothrips shavianus
- Pygothrips vicinus
- Pygothrips zeteki
