= Priesneriana =

Scientific classification
- Kingdom: Animalia
- Phylum: Arthropoda
- Class: Insecta
- Order: Thysanoptera
- Family: Phlaeothripidae
- Genus: Priesneriana; Ananthakrishnan, 1956

Genus of thrips

Priesneriana is a genus of thrips in the family Phlaeothripidae.

== Species ==
- Priesneriana kabandha
- Priesneriana laticeps
- Priesneriana uptoni
