= Ischyrothrips =

Scientific classification
- Kingdom: Animalia
- Phylum: Arthropoda
- Class: Insecta
- Order: Thysanoptera
- Family: Phlaeothripidae
- Genus: Ischyrothrips; Schmutz, 1913

Genus of thrips

Ischyrothrips is a genus of thrips in the family Phlaeothripidae.

== Species ==
- Ischyrothrips crassus
