= Actinothrips =

Scientific classification
- Kingdom: Animalia
- Phylum: Arthropoda
- Class: Insecta
- Order: Thysanoptera
- Family: Phlaeothripidae
- Subfamily: Idolothripinae
- Genus: Actinothrips; Bagnall, 1909

Genus of thrips

Actinothrips is a genus of thrips in the family Phlaeothripidae.

== Species ==
- Actinothrips apithanus
- Actinothrips bondari
- Actinothrips chiapensis
- Actinothrips femoralis
- Actinothrips fraterculus
- Actinothrips gargantua
- Actinothrips longicornis
- Actinothrips monochaetus
- Actinothrips pedalis
- Actinothrips polychaetus
- Actinothrips regalis
- Actinothrips retanae
- Actinothrips trichaetus
