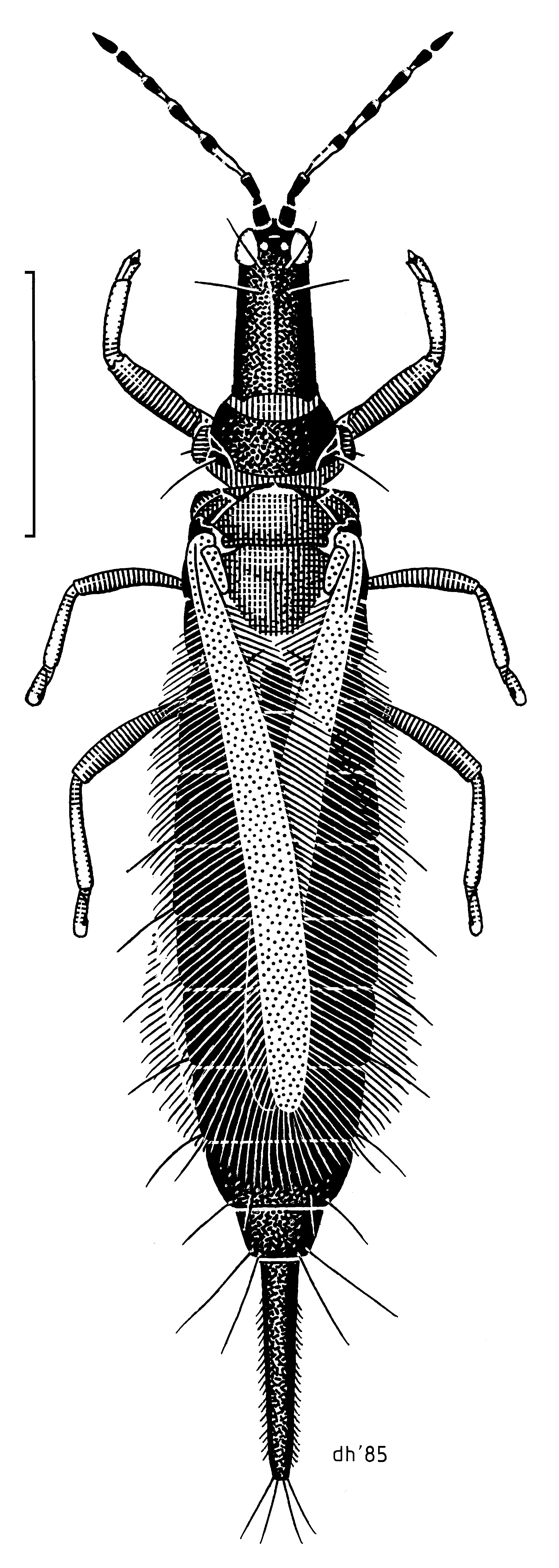
- Cleistothrips idolothripoides by Des Helmore

Scientific classification
- Kingdom: Animalia
- Phylum: Arthropoda
- Class: Insecta
- Order: Thysanoptera
- Family: Phlaeothripidae
- Genus: Cleistothrips; Bagnall, 1932

= Cleistothrips =

Genus of thrips

Cleistothrips is a genus of thrips in the family Phlaeothripidae.

== Species ==
- Cleistothrips idolothripoides
