= Hystricothrips =

Scientific classification
- Kingdom: Animalia
- Phylum: Arthropoda
- Class: Insecta
- Order: Thysanoptera
- Family: Phlaeothripidae
- Genus: Hystricothrips; Karny, 1912

Genus of thrips

Hystricothrips is a genus of thrips in the family Phlaeothripidae.

== Species ==
- Hystricothrips africanus
- Hystricothrips phasgonura
