= Macrothrips =

Scientific classification
- Kingdom: Animalia
- Phylum: Arthropoda
- Class: Insecta
- Order: Thysanoptera
- Family: Phlaeothripidae
- Genus: Macrothrips; Karny, 1920

Genus of thrips

Macrothrips is a genus of thrips in the family Phlaeothripidae.

== Species ==
- Macrothrips papuensis
