= Lamillothrips =

Scientific classification
- Kingdom: Animalia
- Phylum: Arthropoda
- Class: Insecta
- Order: Thysanoptera
- Family: Phlaeothripidae
- Genus: Lamillothrips; Bagnall, 1923

Genus of thrips

Lamillothrips is a genus of thrips in the family Phlaeothripidae.

== Species ==
- Lamillothrips aethiopicus
- Lamillothrips typicus
- Lamillothrips vitulus
