= Celidothrips =

Scientific classification
- Kingdom: Animalia
- Phylum: Arthropoda
- Class: Insecta
- Order: Thysanoptera
- Family: Phlaeothripidae
- Genus: Celidothrips; Priesner, 1951

Genus of thrips

Celidothrips is a genus of thrips in the family Phlaeothripidae.

== Species ==
- Celidothrips adiaphorus
- Celidothrips camelus
- Celidothrips dolichos
- Celidothrips lawrencei
