= Paractinothrips =

Scientific classification
- Kingdom: Animalia
- Phylum: Arthropoda
- Class: Insecta
- Order: Thysanoptera
- Family: Phlaeothripidae
- Genus: Paractinothrips; Mound & Palmer, 1983

Genus of thrips

Paractinothrips is a genus of thrips in the family Phlaeothripidae.

== Species ==
- Paractinothrips peratus
