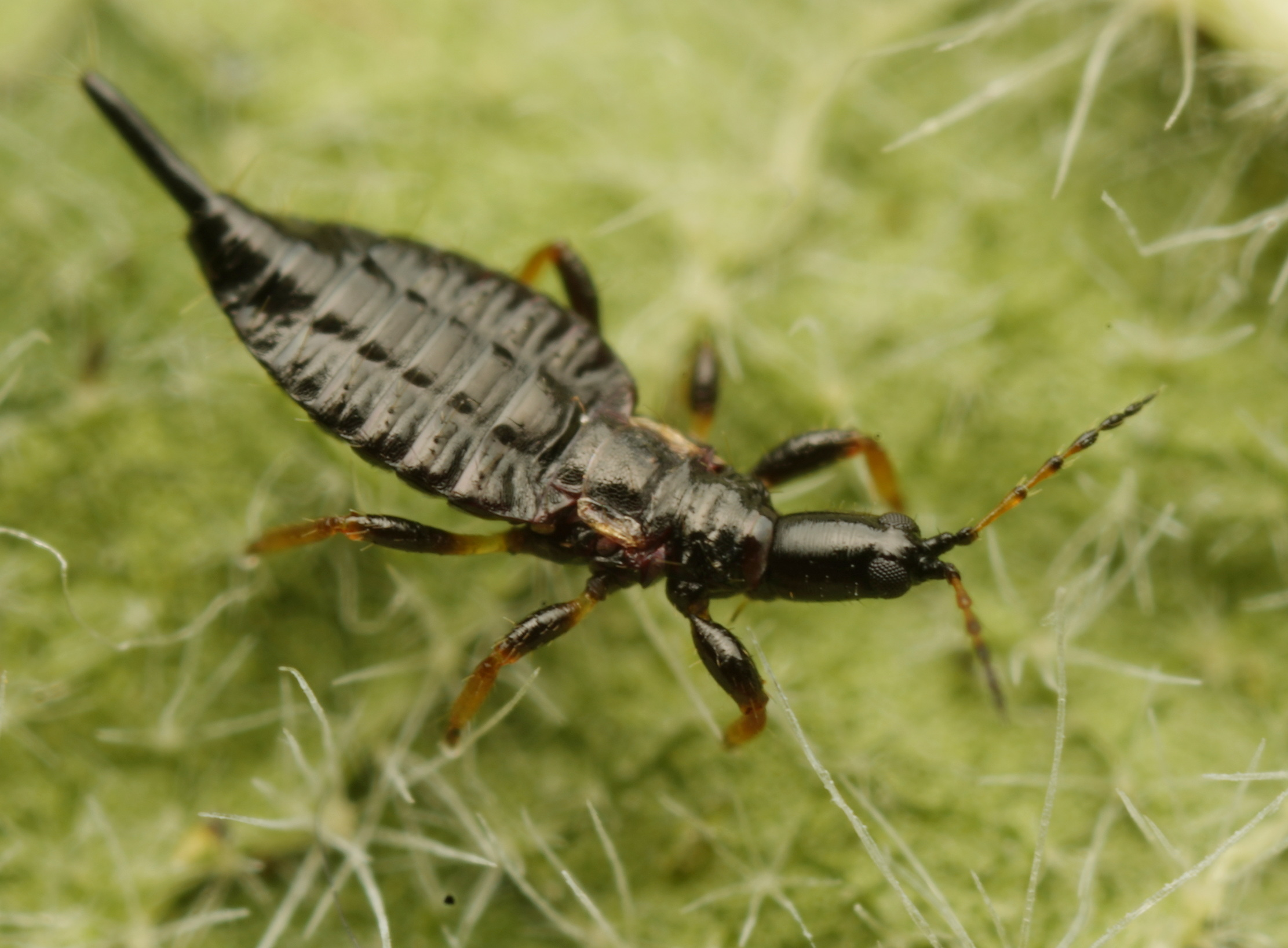
- Megathrips lativentris

Scientific classification
- Kingdom: Animalia
- Phylum: Arthropoda
- Class: Insecta
- Order: Thysanoptera
- Family: Phlaeothripidae
- Genus: Megathrips; Targioni-Tozzetti, 1881

Synonyms
- Megothrips Watson, 1923; Siphonothrips Buffa, 1908

= Megathrips =

Genus of thrips

Megathrips is a genus of thrips in the family Phlaeothripidae.

== Species ==
The following species are recognised in the genus Megathrips:

- Megathrips antennatus Guo, Feng & Duan, 2005
- Megathrips brevis (Bagnall, 1914)
- Megathrips elegans (Buffa, 1908)
- Megathrips flavipes (Reuter, 1901)
- Megathrips inermis Priesner, 1937
- Megathrips lativentris (Heeger, 1852)
- Megathrips timidus Cott, 1956
