= Anaglyptothrips =

Scientific classification
- Kingdom: Animalia
- Phylum: Arthropoda
- Class: Insecta
- Order: Thysanoptera
- Family: Phlaeothripidae
- Genus: Anaglyptothrips; Mound & Palmer, 1983
- Species: A. dugdalei

Binomial name
- Anaglyptothrips dugdalei Mound & Palmer, 1983

Genus of thrips

Anaglyptothrips is a genus of thrips in the family Phlaeothripidae, first described by Laurence Mound and Palmer in 1983. There is only one species known in this genus, Anaglyptothrips dugdalei, which was described from a specimen collected in New Zealand. However it is also found in New South Wales and Queensland. (In New South Wales it has also been found on Norfolk Island.)

The species, Anaglyptothrips dugdalei, is wingless and feeds on fungal spores at the base of grass tussocks.
