= Ecacleistothrips =

Scientific classification
- Kingdom: Animalia
- Phylum: Arthropoda
- Class: Insecta
- Order: Thysanoptera
- Family: Phlaeothripidae
- Genus: Ecacleistothrips; Mound, 2007

Genus of thrips

Ecacleistothrips is a genus of thrips in the family Phlaeothripidae.

== Species ==
- Ecacleistothrips gloriosus
