= Phaulothrips =

Scientific classification
- Kingdom: Animalia
- Phylum: Arthropoda
- Class: Insecta
- Order: Thysanoptera
- Family: Phlaeothripidae
- Genus: Phaulothrips; Hood, 1918

Genus of thrips

Phaulothrips is a genus of thrips in the family Phlaeothripidae.

== Species ==
- Phaulothrips agrestis
- Phaulothrips anici
- Phaulothrips barretti
- Phaulothrips caudatus
- Phaulothrips daguilaris
- Phaulothrips flindersi
- Phaulothrips fuscus
- Phaulothrips inquilinus
- Phaulothrips kingae
- Phaulothrips kranzae
- Phaulothrips longitubus
- Phaulothrips magnificus
- Phaulothrips melanosomus
- Phaulothrips oakeyi
- Phaulothrips orientalis
- Phaulothrips sibylla
- Phaulothrips solifer
- Phaulothrips uptoni
- Phaulothrips vuilleti
- Phaulothrips whyallae
