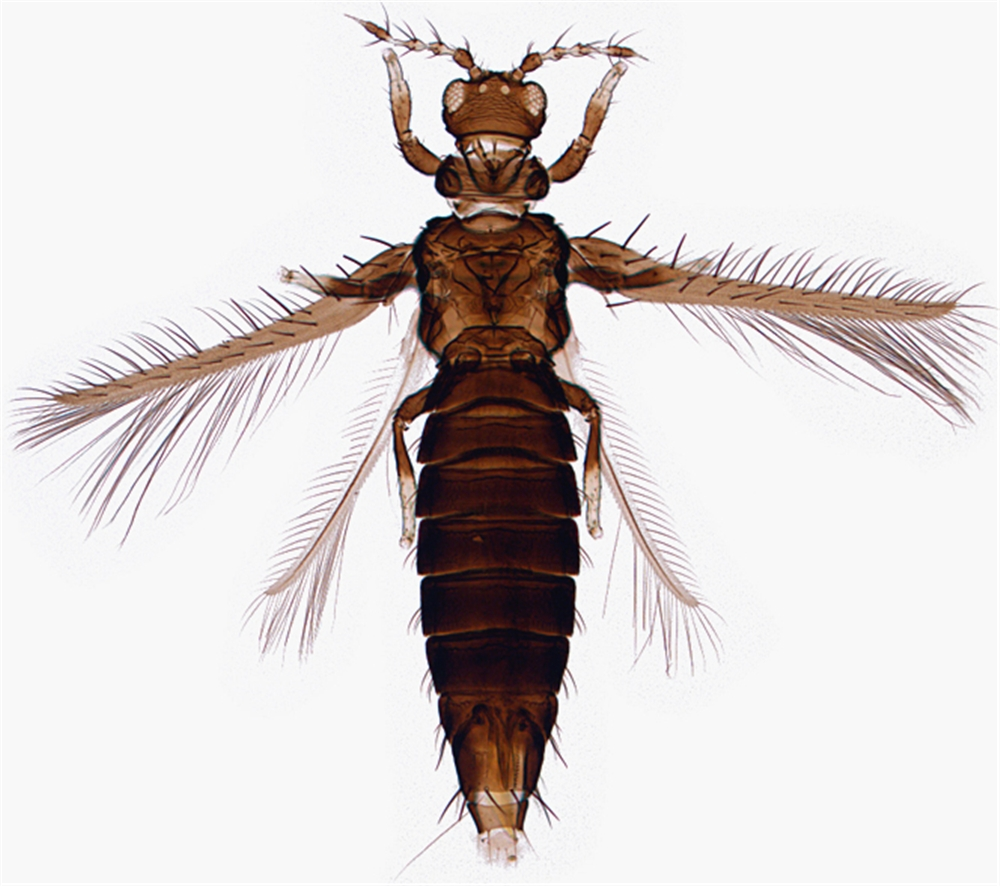

Scientific classification
- Domain: Eukaryota
- Kingdom: Animalia
- Phylum: Arthropoda
- Class: Insecta
- Order: Thysanoptera
- Family: Thripidae
- Genus: Selenothrips
- Species: S. rubrocinctus

Binomial name
- Selenothrips rubrocinctus (Giard, 1901)

Synonyms
- Heliothrips rubrocinctus Giard; Physopus rubrocinctus Giard (1901); Heliothrips decolor Karny; Heliothrips mendex Schmutz; Brachyurothrips indicus Bagnall

= Selenothrips rubrocinctus =

Species of thrip

Selenothrips rubrocinctus, commonly known as the redbanded thrips, is a species of thrips in the family Thripidae. It was first described from the West Indies but may have originated in northern South America. It has spread to other parts of the world and now has a near pan-tropical distribution, occurring in North, Central, and South America, Africa, southern Asia, and Australasia.

== Description ==
The adult female redbanded thrip is about 1.2 mm (0.05 in) in length; the male is slightly smaller, but is seldom observed. The colour of both is black or dark brown with a reddish tinge, especially in the first three abdominal segments and the anal segments. The wings are dark. The nymphs and pupae are distinctively coloured being yellow or pale orange, with the first three abdominal segments and the tip of the abdomen being vivid red.

== Life cycle ==
Adult female redbanded thrips live for about a month, during which time they lay up to fifty eggs which are produced by parthenogenesis. Each egg is deposited into the underside of a leaf, and covered by a drop of fluid which hardens into a protective black disc. After about four days, the eggs hatch into nymphs which have two instars. The nymphal period lasts for about nine days and is followed by two non-feeding stages, a pre-pupal and a pupal stage. The whole life cycle takes about three weeks, and there are several generations of the insect each year.

== Damage ==
A large number of fruiting and ornamental trees act as hosts to this thrips. It is a significant pest of cacao and mango in the West Indies. The adults and nymphs insert their mouthparts into the epidermis of young leaves, killing the cells as they suck sap and causing leaf silvering or browning. The leaf margins crinkle and the leaves become distorted and covered with dark faecal pellets. In heavy infestations the leaves drop off the tree, which may become denuded. Fruit may also be attacked, developing a russet appearance with cracks developing and decay setting in.
