= Pseudocryptothrips =

Scientific classification
- Kingdom: Animalia
- Phylum: Arthropoda
- Class: Insecta
- Order: Thysanoptera
- Family: Phlaeothripidae
- Genus: Pseudocryptothrips; Priesner, 1919

Genus of thrips

Pseudocryptothrips is a genus of thrips in the family Phlaeothripidae.

== Species ==
- Pseudocryptothrips fuscicauda
- Pseudocryptothrips gradatus
- Pseudocryptothrips meridionalis
