= Illinothrips =

Scientific classification
- Kingdom: Animalia
- Phylum: Arthropoda
- Class: Insecta
- Order: Thysanoptera
- Family: Phlaeothripidae
- Genus: Illinothrips; Stannard, 1954

Genus of thrips

Illinothrips is a genus of thrips in the family Phlaeothripidae.

== Species ==
- Illinothrips rossi
