= Bactrothrips =

Scientific classification
- Kingdom: Animalia
- Phylum: Arthropoda
- Clade: Pancrustacea
- Class: Insecta
- Order: Thysanoptera
- Family: Phlaeothripidae
- Genus: Bactrothrips; Karny, 1912

Synonyms
- Lasiothrips Moulton, 1968

Genus of insects

Bactrothrips is a genus of thrips in the family Phlaeothripidae, first described by Heinrich Hugo Karny in 1912. In 2011, Mound and Tree synonymised the genus, Lasiothrips, with Bactrothrips

== Species ==
- Bactrothrips aberlenci
- Bactrothrips aliceae
- Bactrothrips alluaudi
- Bactrothrips aterrimus
- Bactrothrips atrispinis
- Bactrothrips bancoensis
- Bactrothrips berlandi
- Bactrothrips brevitubus
- Bactrothrips bucculentus
- Bactrothrips buffai
- Bactrothrips carbonarius
- Bactrothrips congoensis
- Bactrothrips cookae
- Bactrothrips delamarei
- Bactrothrips divergens
- Bactrothrips elongatus
- Bactrothrips flectoventris
- Bactrothrips furcatus
- Bactrothrips furvescrus
- Bactrothrips grandis
- Bactrothrips guineaensis
- Bactrothrips guineensis
- Bactrothrips hesperus
- Bactrothrips honoris
- Bactrothrips hoodi
- Bactrothrips houstoni
- Bactrothrips idolomorphus
- Bactrothrips inermis
- Bactrothrips kenyensis
- Bactrothrips kranzae
- Bactrothrips laingi
- Bactrothrips lamottei
- Bactrothrips levidens
- Bactrothrips longisetis
- Bactrothrips longiventris
- Bactrothrips luteus
- Bactrothrips macropteryx
- Bactrothrips malgassus
- Bactrothrips montanus
- Bactrothrips moultoni
- Bactrothrips natalensis
- Bactrothrips nativus
- Bactrothrips nigripes
- Bactrothrips pallidicrus
- Bactrothrips parvidens
- Bactrothrips perplexus
- Bactrothrips pictipes
- Bactrothrips pitkini
- Bactrothrips priesneri
- Bactrothrips propinquus
- Bactrothrips quadrituberculatus
- Bactrothrips titschacki
