= Egchocephalothrips =

Scientific classification
- Kingdom: Animalia
- Phylum: Arthropoda
- Class: Insecta
- Order: Thysanoptera
- Family: Phlaeothripidae
- Genus: Egchocephalothrips; Bagnall, 1916

Genus of thrips

Egchocephalothrips is a genus of thrips in the family Phlaeothripidae.

== Species ==
- Egchocephalothrips monstrosus
