= Anallothrips =

Scientific classification
- Kingdom: Animalia
- Phylum: Arthropoda
- Class: Insecta
- Order: Thysanoptera
- Family: Phlaeothripidae
- Genus: Anallothrips; Okajima & Urushihara, 1997

Genus of thrips

Anallothrips is a genus of thrips in the family Phlaeothripidae.

== Species ==
- Anallothrips vietotubus
