= Edwin Leonard Gill =

British ornithologist and museum curator (1877-1956)

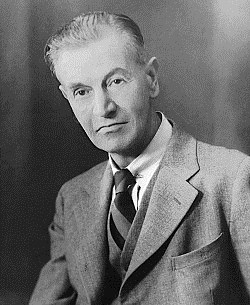
Edwin Leonard Gill (1877 –1956) was a British ornithologist, taxidermist, and museum curator.

Edwin Leonard Gill (17 November 1877 – 5 July 1956) was a British ornithologist, taxidermist, and museum curator. He was usually known as E. Leonard Gill. He first directed the Hancock Museum of Natural History (1901–1922), then the National Museum of Scotland (1922–1924), and finally the Iziko South African Museum (1925–1942). He was a Fellow of the Royal Society of South Africa and President of the South African Ornithological Society. He served in a volunteer ambulance unit during the First World War.

== Early life ==
Edwin Leonard Gill was born in Redhill, Surrey, on 17 November 1877, into a Quaker family. After going to a Quaker school, he studied at Owens College, then a constituent college of Victoria University of Manchester and graduating in 1899. He subsequently became assistant curator at the Manchester Museum.

== Newcastle-upon-Tyne and Edinburgh ==
In 1901, he was appointed curator of the Hancock Museum of Natural History in Newcastle-upon-Tyne and he became a member of the Vale of Derwent Naturalists' Field Club. During the First World War, he took leave to join the Friends' Ambulance Unit and he was demobilised in February 1919, at which time he returned to his post. In August 1922, he left the Hancock Museum for the National Museum of Scotland in Edinburgh, where he was put in charge of the ornithology department and remained for two years. During this period, he published a number of articles about fossils.

== Cape Town ==
In 1924, he accepted the directorship of the Museum of South Africa (now the Iziko South African Museum) in Cape Town, where he took up his post on January 1, 1925; he oversaw many renovations and expansions. This included adding descriptions in Afrikaans, in order to broaden the museum's accessibility to the public. He retired in 1942, at the age of 64. Gill travelled to South Africa with his sister Marion Gill, who created the illustrations for his book A First Guide to South African Birds, published in 1936. It was intended for to be the first inexpensive book to South Africa's birdlife for everyday use. It was reprinted several times, the seventh edition appearing 19 years after his death. In 1925, upon arriving in South Africa, he became a Member of the Royal Society of South Africa and was elected to a fellowship in 1929. He was president of the South African Ornithological Society in 1930 and 1954.

He died in Cape Town on July 5, 1956. His sister Marion stayed a further year in South Africa before returning to the UK, where she died in 1959.
