= Parthenothrips =

Scientific classification
- Kingdom: Animalia
- Phylum: Arthropoda
- Class: Insecta
- Order: Thysanoptera
- Family: Thripidae
- Genus: Parthenothrips; Uzel, 1895
- Species: P. dracaenae

Binomial name
- Parthenothrips dracaenae (Heeger, 1854)

Genus of thrips

Parthenothrips is a genus of thrips in the family Thripidae. There is one described species in Parthenothrips, P. dracaenae.
