= George Alexander Louis Lebour =

English geologist (1847–1918)

George Alexander Louis Lebour (1847 – 21 February 1918) was an English geologist.

Lebour was educated at the Royal School of Mines and was then a staff member of the Geological Survey from 1873 to 1876. At the Durham College of Science, he was a lecturer in geological surveying from 1876 to 1879 and then succeeded David Page as professor of geology upon the latter's death in 1879. Lebour held this professorial chair until his own death in 1918.

He wrote Handbook to the Geology and Natural History of Northumberland and Durham, which went through three editions from 1879 to 1889. He wrote more than 100 papers on carboniferous geology, thermal conductivity of rocks, and underground temperature. He was awarded the Murchison Medal in 1904.

Upon his death, Lebour was survived by his widow Emily and two daughters; another daughter predeceased him. His youngest daughter was the noted marine biologist Marie Lebour.

== Selected bibliography ==
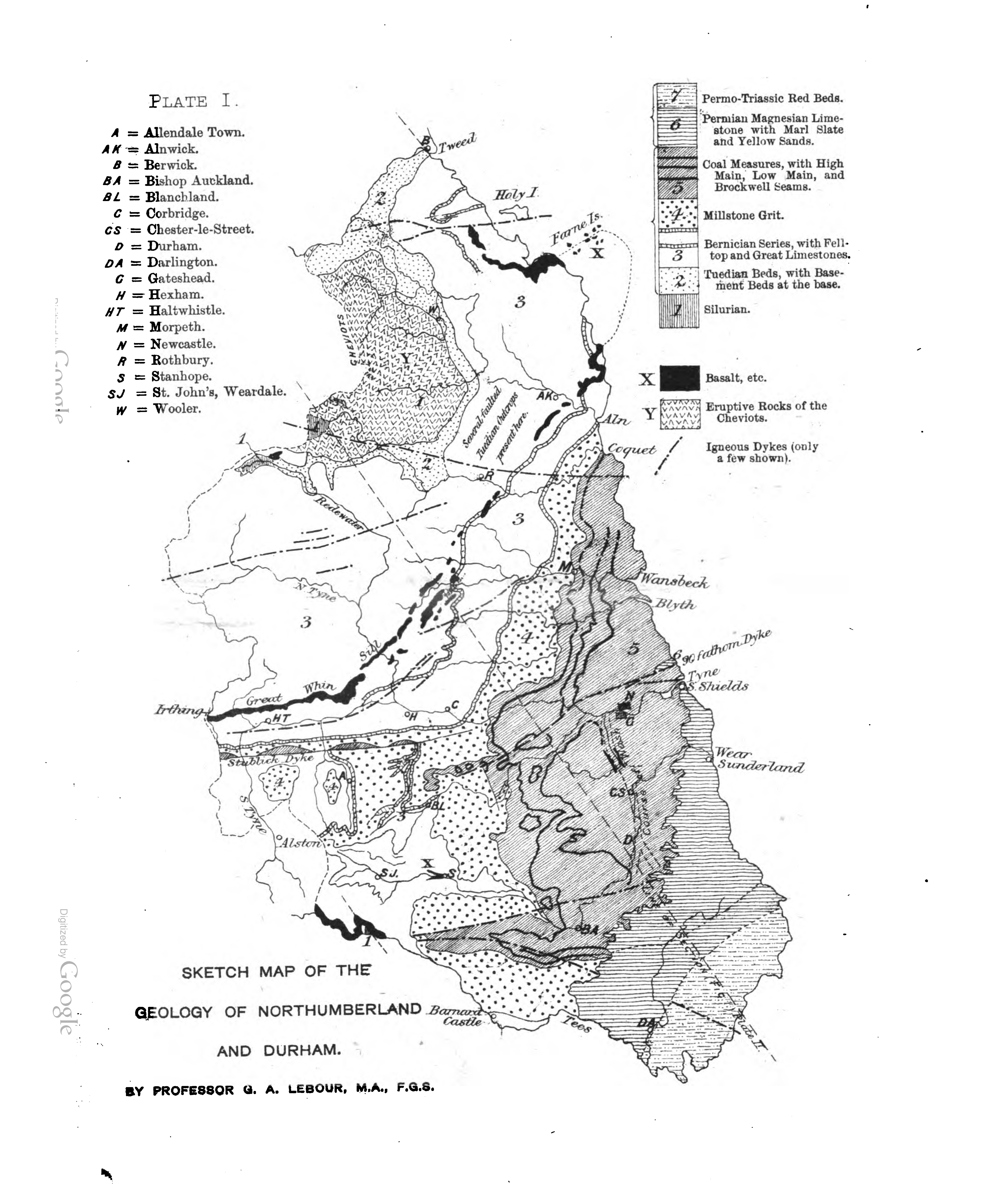
Geological map of Northumberland and Durham. From Lebour (1886)

- Lebour, G.A. (1870). "On the Coal-bearing Rocks of Southern Chile". Geological Magazine. 7 (77): 499–509. Bibcode:1870GeoM....7..499L. doi:10.1017/S0016756800469487. S2CID 130983011.
- —— (1871). "The Submergence of Is, in Western Brittany". Geological Magazine. 8 (85): 300–303. doi:10.1017/S0016756800161485. S2CID 130109586.
- —— (1875). "On the Limits of the Yoredale Series in the North of England". Geological Magazine. 2 (11): 539–544. Bibcode:1875GeoM....2..539L. doi:10.1017/S0016756800160467. S2CID 129799802.
- —— (1876). "On the larger divisions of the Carboniferous System in Northumberland". Transactions of the North of England Institute of Mining Engineers. 25: 225–237.
- Topley, W.; Lebour, G.A. (1877). "On the intrusive character of the Whin Sill of Northumberland". Quarterly Journal of the Geological Society. 33 (1–4): 406–422. Bibcode:1877QJGS...33..406T. doi:10.1144/GSL.JGS.1877.033.01-04.21. S2CID 140565869.
- —— (1878). Catalogue of the Hutton Collection of Fossil Plants: Including a Synoptical List of the Chief Carboniferous Species Not in the Collection. Londoon: Longmans.
- —— (1882). "On the present State of our Knowledge of Underground Temperature, with special Reference to the Nature of the Experiments still required in order to improve this Knowledge". Transactions of the North of England Institute of Mining Engineers. 31: 59–73.
- —— (1884). "On the Breccia-Gashes of the Durham coast and some recent earthshakes at Sunderland". Transactions of the North of England Institute of Mining Engineers. 33: 165–177.
- —— (1886). Outlines of the Geology of Northumberland and Durham. Newcastle-upon-Tyne: Lambert and Company.
- —— (1906). "On a case of unconformity and thrust in the Coal-Measures of Northumberland". Quarterly Journal of the Geological Society. 62 (1–4): 530–551. Bibcode:1906QJGS...62..530L. doi:10.1144/GSL.JGS.1906.062.01-04.27. S2CID 128961691.
