= Paul Marchal =

French entomologist (1862–1942)

Paul Alfred Daniel Marchal (27 September 1862, Paris, – 2 March 1942, Paris) was a French entomologist. He was president of the French Entomological Society (Société entomologique de France) in 1907. He was president of the French Zoological Society (Société zoologique de France) in 1909.

In 1883 Marchal received his undergraduate degree from the Academy of Paris (University of France). In 1889 he received a doctorate in medicine and in 1892 a doctorate in science, from the same institution.

Marchal worked for the French government in Paris as an entomologist for the Ministry of Agriculture. In 1894 he became chief-of-staff of the entomology section, and in 1910 he became Director of the entomology station in Paris. In 1898 he started teaching at the Institut national agronomique (National Institute of Agriculture) and in 1900 he was appointed as a professor of applied zoology and agriculture.

In 1912, based on the American experience with Novius cardinalis and the earlier work of Raymond Poutiers, he made the first release of acclimatized ladybugs in Europe, in Alpes-Maritimes in southeastern France, for the biological control of cochineal scale.

Marchal was a member of the French Academy of Sciences from 1912 until his death in 1942.
