= Richard Siddoway Bagnall =

English entomologist and industrialist (1889–1962)

- Born: 14 July 1884
- Died: 19 January 1962 (aged 77)
- Occupation: Zoological collector, scientific collector
- Awards: Fellow of the Royal Entomological Society (1904); Fellow of the Linnean Society of London (1909)

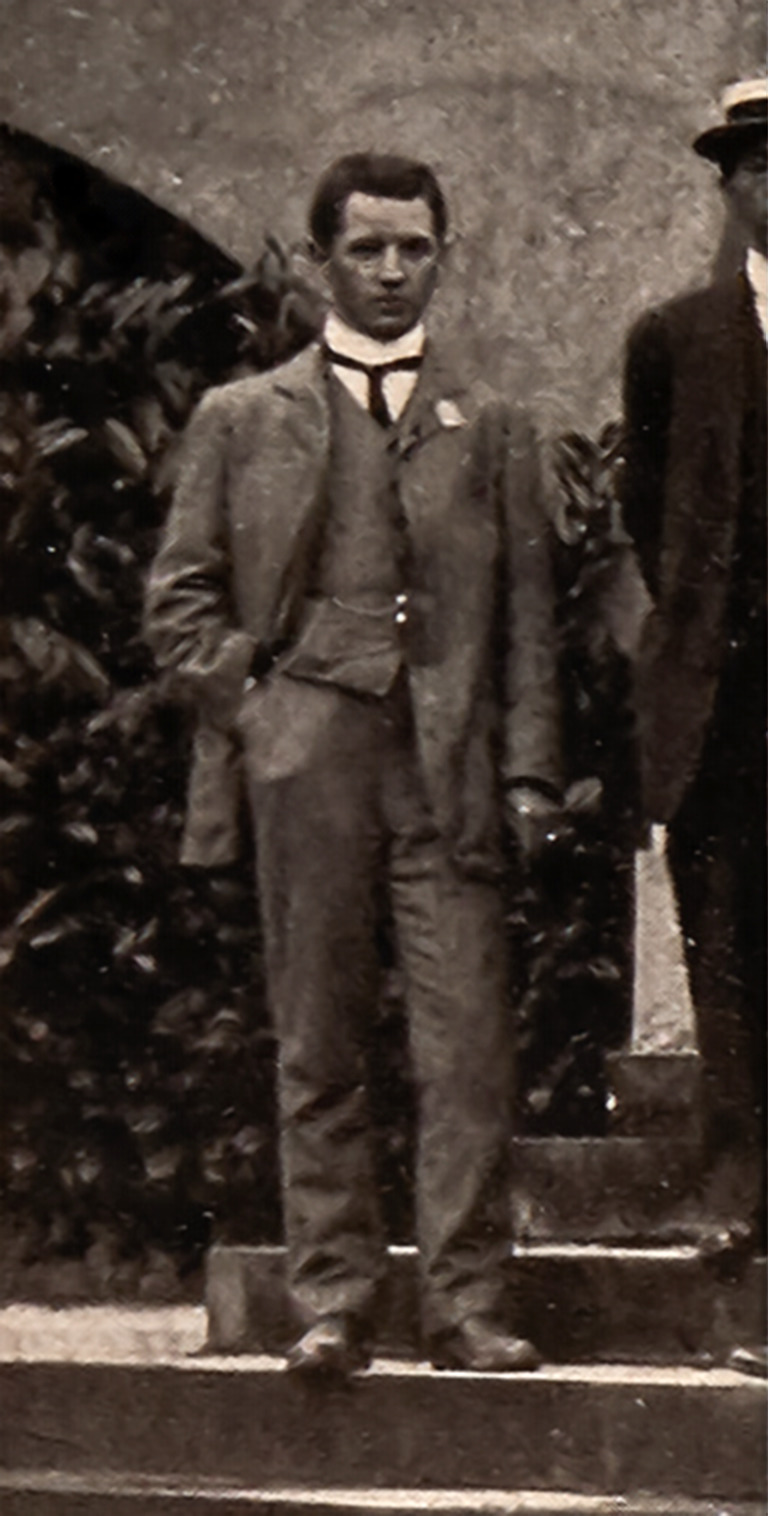
Richard Siddoway Bagnall at the First International Congress of Entomology in Brussels, 1910.

Richard Siddoway Bagnall (14 July 1884 - 19 January 1962) was an English entomologist. Bagnall specialised in Thysanoptera and published several important works on the higher classification of this insect order throughout the world, describing many new genera and species.

A comprehensive account of his life and work is given by Louise Berridge.

== Early life and education ==
Richard Siddoway Bagnall was born in Winlaton, England (near Whickham) on 14 July 1884 to father Thomas W. Bagnall (1862-ca.1907) and mother Emily Florence Lane (ca. 1862-1932). He had meningitis and rheumatic fever as a child, and although his two brothers went to boarding school in their teenage years, Bagnall was sheltered by his family and educated privately at home. He showed a keen interest in entomology during his childhood, being active in the Vale of Derwent Naturalists' Field Club and was President from 1909-1911. He published his first paper in 1906 on an unusual beetle that he collected from his cellar.

== Entomological Research ==
Bagnall described 577 species and 100 genera within the insect order Thysanoptera in over 120 publications.

== Awards ==
In 1904, Bagnall was elected a Fellow of the Royal Entomological Society of London and in 1909 he was elected a Fellow of the Linnean Society of London.
