= Hermann Priesner =

Austrian zoologist - specialist in thrips

Hermann Priesner (19 November 1891 – 11 August 1974) was an Austrian professor of natural history and a specialist on thrips although he also took an interest in other groups such as Hymenoptera, and Hemiptera.

Priesner was born in Linz, Austria, the son of Karl Priesner who was himself an amateur insect collector. Young Priesner began collecting insects at the age of 10. He went to the University of Graz and published on insects from 1914 to 1919. One of his major works was the Die Thysanopteren Europas (1928). He became a professor of natural history at Linz and also served in committees on plant protection working in Egypt. He made studies of the whiteflies and scale insects of Egypt. He worked from 1950 to 1958 as a professor at the Fouad and Ibrahim Universities in Cairo.

Priesner was married to Gertrud who outlived him along with a daughter. A son died young.

Priesner's zoological author abbreviation is Priesner.

== See also ==
- Taxa named by Hermann Priesner
