= Joseph Douglas Hood =

American entomologist

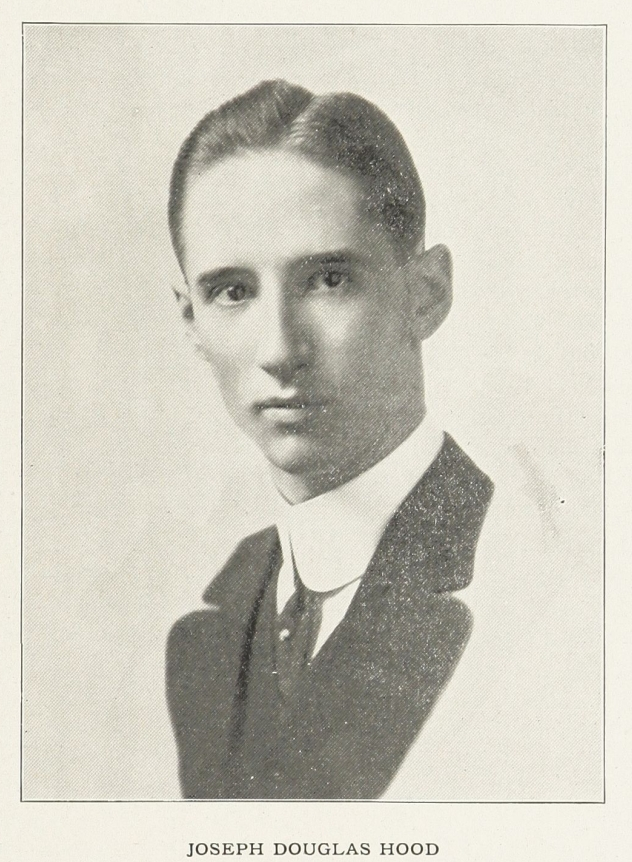
Hood c. 1912

Joseph Douglas Hood (28 November 1889 – 22 October 1966) was an American entomologist and a specialist on the thrips (Thysanoptera). He served as a professor of entomology at the University of Rochester and at Cornell University.

Hood was born in Laramie, Wyoming to dentist Thomas Henry and Eva Maria Josephine Dickson. Hood was schooled at Irving School and Richard T. Crane High School in Chicago. At the age of eighteen he worked part-time at the Illinois Natural History Survey and described a new species of thrips. He received a BA in biological science from the University of Illinois in 1910 followed by a MA from George Washington University in 1913. During the first world war he taught military science and tactics at the University of Illinois (1910–11). Between 1917 and 1920 he served in the US Army. He then went to Cornell University and worked under J. Chester Bradley earning a Ph.D. in 1931. He worked as an instructor from 1922 to 1925 at the University of Rochester and became a full professor in 1928. He moved to Cornell University in 1938 where he became a full professor only in 1948. He retired in 1957 and then worked as an emeritus professor. Hood's students included Howard Ensign Evans.

Hood made large collections of Thysanoptera, making trips to South America, Mexico, and the Caribbean region. His specimens included 60000 slide mounts of 2117 species of which 1055 were holotypes that he had described.

Hood married Helen Madge Hincher, who was dean of women at Ithaca College, in 1930. They had a daughter and a son from an earlier marriage. He died in Ithaca.
