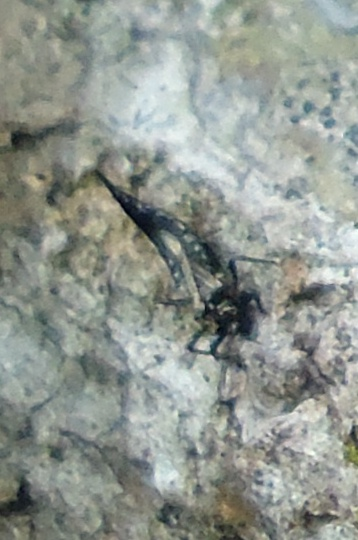
- Fungus feeding thrips from the Philippines

Scientific classification
- Kingdom: Animalia
- Phylum: Arthropoda
- Clade: Pancrustacea
- Class: Insecta
- Order: Thysanoptera
- Suborder: Tubulifera
- Family: Phlaeothripidae; Uzel, 1895

Subfamilies
- Idolothripinae; Phlaeothripinae

= Phlaeothripidae =

Phlaeothripidae Temporal range: Eocene–Recent

Family of thrips

Phlaeothripidae is a family of thrips with hundreds of genera. They are the only extant family of the suborder Tubulifera, alongside the extinct family Rohrthripidae and are themselves ordered into two subfamilies, the Idolothripinae with 80 genera, and the Phlaeothripinae with almost 400. Some 3,400 species are recognised in this family, and many are fungivores living in the tropics.

Thrips from this family are fairly common, and are generally larger than those in the suborder Terebrantia (containing all other thrips). Idolothrips marginatus can attain a body length of up to 14 mm. The group is distinguished by having the last abdominal segment modified into a tube-like structure – hence the suborder's name, which means "tube-bearers".

== Selected species ==
Some of the better-known species are:

- Aleurothrips fasciapennis (Franklin) - feeds on whiteflies
- Gynaikothrips ficorum (Marchal) - Cuban laurel thrips
- Haplothrips froggatti Hood - Black plague thrips
- Haplothrips gowdeyi (Franklin) - Goldtipped tubular thrips
- Haplothrips niger (Osborne) - Red clover thrips
- Haplothrips victoriensis Bagnall - Tubular black thrips
- Idolothrips spectrum Haliday - Giant thrips
- Leptothrips mali Fitch - Black hunter, is used to control mites
- Liothrips urichi Karny - Clidemia thrips
- Liothrips vaneeckei Priesner - Lily thrips, damages the bulbs of lilies
- Teuchothrips disjunctus (Hood) - Bottlebrush thrips
- Hoplandrothrips - causes leaf rolling of Coffea plants
