= Glolarnaca globiceps =

Scientific classification
- Kingdom: Animalia
- Phylum: Arthropoda
- Class: Insecta
- Order: Orthoptera
- Suborder: Ensifera
- Family: Gryllacrididae
- Subfamily: Gryllacridinae
- Tribe: Gryllacridini
- Genus: Glolarnaca
- Species: G. globiceps

Binomial name
- Glolarnaca globiceps (Karny, 1929)

Synonyms
- Gryllacris globiceps Karny, 1929; Borneogryllacris globiceps Karny, 1929; Capnogryllacris globiceps Gorochov, 2003; Zalarnaca (Glolarnaca) globiceps Gorochov, 2008

Species of cricket-like animals

Glolarnaca globiceps is a species of Orthopterans, sometimes known as 'leaf-folding crickets' in the tribe Gryllacridini, recorded from Vietnam and Cambodia.

The family Gryllacrididae has been subject to extensive revision in the 21st century, illustrated by G. globiceps having been included in at least four other genera, before the current placement of genus Glolarnaca in subfamily Gryllacridinae in 2019.

== Subspecies and distribution ==
Three subspecies are currently recognised:

- G. globiceps gialai (Gorochov, 2008) - near Buon Luoi, Gia Lai Province, Vietnam
- G. globiceps globiceps (Karny, 1929) - type locality: Cambodia (unspecified)
- G. globiceps minor (Ingrisch, 2018) - Dong Nai Biosphere Reserve, Vietnam
