= Dracogryllacris =

Scientific classification
- Kingdom: Animalia
- Phylum: Arthropoda
- Class: Insecta
- Order: Orthoptera
- Suborder: Ensifera
- Family: Gryllacrididae
- Subfamily: Gryllacridinae
- Genus: Dracogryllacris; Li, Yin & He, 2024

Genus of cricket-like animals

External image
- Images at iNaturalist

Dracogryllacris is a is genus of Asian orthopterans, sometimes known as 'raspy crickets' or 'leaf-folding crickets': in the subfamily Gryllacridinae, with no tribe assigned; it includes species previously placed in other genera such as Capnogryllacris and Gryllacris. Records of occurrence are from China (including Hainan Island), Taiwan and Vietnam.

== Species ==
The Orthoptera Species File includes the following:

1. Dracogryllacris axinis (Bian, Liu & Yang, 2021)
2. Dracogryllacris humberti (Griffini, 1914) - Vietnam
3. Dracogryllacris latilamargis (Duan, Chen & Shi, 2023)
4. Dracogryllacris melanocrania (Karny, 1929) – type species (as Gryllacris melanocrania Karny, 1929) from eastern China
5. Dracogryllacris nanlingensis (Li, Liu & Li, 2014)
6. Dracogryllacris nigromaculata (Ingrisch, 2018)
7. Dracogryllacris nigromarginata (Karny, 1928)
8. Dracogryllacris proxima (Gorochov, 2003) - Vietnam
9. Dracogryllacris spinosa (Li, Liu & Li, 2014)
10. Dracogryllacris zhoui (Pang, Zhang & Bian, 2023)
