= Anancistrogera =

Scientific classification
- Domain: Eukaryota
- Kingdom: Animalia
- Phylum: Arthropoda
- Class: Insecta
- Order: Orthoptera
- Suborder: Ensifera
- Family: Gryllacrididae
- Subfamily: Gryllacridinae
- Tribe: Gryllacridini
- Genus: Anancistrogera; Karny, 1937

Synonyms
- Pseudolarnaca Gorochov, 2005

Genus of insects

External image
- Images at iNaturalist

Anancistrogera is a genus of Orthopterans, sometimes known as 'leaf-folding crickets' in the tribe Gryllacridini and typical of the newly erected genus group Anancistrogerae. The recorded distribution is: Sri Lanka, Thailand and western Malesia (but locality records are probably incomplete).

Note this genus name should not be confused with Aancistroger in the tribe Phryganogryllacridini.

== Species ==
The Orthoptera Species File lists:

1. Anancistrogera bicornuta (Karny, 1930)
2. Anancistrogera brachyptera (Gerstaecker, 1860)
  - type species (as Gryllacris brachyptera Gerstaecker = A. brachyptera brachyptera)
3. Anancistrogera ceylonica Karny, 1937
4. Anancistrogera chopardi (Karny, 1926)
5. Anancistrogera cornualis (Ingrisch, 2018)
6. Anancistrogera crucispina (Karny, 1929)
7. Anancistrogera dubia Willemse, 1953
8. Anancistrogera fuscinervis (Stål, 1877)
9. Anancistrogera genualis (Walker, 1869)
10. Anancistrogera isseli (Griffini, 1913)
11. Anancistrogera limbaticollis (Stål, 1877)
12. Anancistrogera nigrogeniculata (Brunner von Wattenwyl, 1888)
13. Anancistrogera nigroscutata (Brunner von Wattenwyl, 1888)
14. Anancistrogera palauensis Vickery & Kevan, 1999
15. Anancistrogera plebeja (Stål, 1877)
16. Anancistrogera recticauda (Karny, 1925)
17. Anancistrogera sarasini (Karny, 1931)
