= Glolarnaca =

Scientific classification
- Kingdom: Animalia
- Phylum: Arthropoda
- Class: Insecta
- Order: Orthoptera
- Suborder: Ensifera
- Family: Gryllacrididae
- Subfamily: Gryllacridinae
- Tribe: Gryllacridini
- Genus: Glolarnaca; Gorochov, 2008

Genus of cricket-like animals

External image
- Images at iNaturalist

Glolarnaca is a genus of Orthopterans, sometimes known as 'leaf-folding crickets' in the tribe Gryllacridini. The recorded distribution is from China, Vietnam and Cambodia.

Glolarnaca was originally described as the subgenus Zalarnaca (Glolarnaca) by Andrey Gorochov; its elevation to genus level in subfamily Gryllacridinae has been accepted by authorities such as Cadena-Castañeda and Yang. Species such as G. globiceps (originally identified from Cambodia and Vietnam) have also been placed in other more related genera such as Gryllacris and also Capnogryllacris.

== Species ==
The Orthoptera Species File lists:

1. Glolarnaca carinata Pang & Bian, 2023
2. Glolarnaca elegantula (Ingrisch, 2018)
3. Glolarnaca flata Luo, Zhang & Bian, 2024
4. Glolarnaca globiceps (Karny, 1929) (Indochina, 3 subspecies)
5. Glolarnaca hainanica (Li, Liu & Li, 2016)
6. Glolarnaca kunyui Yang, Lu & Bian, 2021
7. Glolarnaca nigrimacula Yang, Lu & Bian, 2021
8. Glolarnaca ornatula (Gorochov, 2008) - type species (as Zalarnaca ornatula Gorochov)
9. Glolarnaca pulcherrima (Gorochov, 2008)
10. Glolarnaca sinica (Li, Liu & Li, 2016)
