= Dictyogryllacris =

Scientific classification
- Domain: Eukaryota
- Kingdom: Animalia
- Phylum: Arthropoda
- Class: Insecta
- Order: Orthoptera
- Suborder: Ensifera
- Family: Gryllacrididae
- Subfamily: Hyperbaeninae
- Tribe: Capnogryllacridini
- Genus: Dictyogryllacris; Karny, 1937

Genus of cricket-like animals

External image
- Image at iNaturalist

Dictyogryllacris is a genus of Asian orthopterans sometimes known as "leaf-folding-" or "raspy-crickets", in the subfamily Hyperbaeninae and tribe Capnogryllacridini; it was erected by Heinrich Hugo Karny in 1937. Species have been recorded from Sri Lanka and western Malesia (including peninsular Malaysia, not the Philippines or Sulawesi).

== Species ==
The Orthoptera Species File lists:

1. Dictyogryllacris dyscrita (Karny, 1928)
2. Dictyogryllacris raapi (Griffini, 1908)
3. Dictyogryllacris reticulata (Brunner von Wattenwyl, 1888) (2 subspecies, of which the nominate is the type species: originally as Gryllacris reticulata Brunner von Wattenwyl)
4. Dictyogryllacris signatifrons (Serville, 1838) (2 subspecies)
