= Aancistroger =

Scientific classification
- Domain: Eukaryota
- Kingdom: Animalia
- Phylum: Arthropoda
- Class: Insecta
- Order: Orthoptera
- Suborder: Ensifera
- Family: Gryllacrididae
- Subfamily: Hyperbaeninae
- Tribe: Phryganogryllacridini
- Genus: Aancistroger; Bey-Bienko, 1957

Genus of insects

External image
- Image at iNaturalist

Aancistroger is a genus of Orthopterans, sometimes known as 'leaf-folding crickets' in the newly erected subfamily Hyperbaeninae and tribe Phryganogryllacridini. A key to the species is given by Bian, Jing Liu & Zizhong Yang, with a recorded distribution from China and Indochina.

Note this genus name should not be confused with Anancistrogera in the tribe Gryllacridini.

== Species ==
The Orthoptera Species File lists:

1. Aancistroger elbenioides (Karny, 1926)
2. Aancistroger inarmatus Ingrisch, 2018
3. Aancistroger primitivus Gorochov, 2005
4. Aancistroger similis Gorochov, 2008
5. Aancistroger sinicus Bey-Bienko, 1957 - type species
6. Aancistroger vietus Gorochov, 2004
