= Glomeremus orchidophilus =

Scientific classification
- Domain: Eukaryota
- Kingdom: Animalia
- Phylum: Arthropoda
- Class: Insecta
- Order: Orthoptera
- Suborder: Ensifera
- Family: Gryllacrididae
- Subfamily: Gryllacridinae
- Tribe: Ametroidini
- Genus: Glomeremus
- Species: G. orchidophilus

Binomial name
- Glomeremus orchidophilus Hugel et al.

Species of cricket-like animal

Glomeremus orchidophilus is a recently (2010) discovered species of raspy cricket found in the island of Réunion in the Mascarene Islands. It is the only known pollinator of the orchid Angraecum cadetii. It is also the only cricket known to pollinate a flower.
