= Capnogryllacris =

Scientific classification
- Kingdom: Animalia
- Phylum: Arthropoda
- Clade: Pancrustacea
- Class: Insecta
- Order: Orthoptera
- Suborder: Ensifera
- Family: Gryllacrididae
- Tribe: Capnogryllacridini
- Genus: Capnogryllacris; Karny, 1937

Species
- see text

Synonyms
- Erythrogryllacris Karny, 1937

Genus of cricket-like animals

External image
- Images at iNaturalist

Capnogryllacris is a genus of leaf-rolling crickets in the subfamily Gryllacridinae and tribe Capnogryllacridini, erected by Heinrich Hugo Karny in 1937. Species are found in Far East and South Asia; two other of Karny's genera were previously placed here: Borneogryllacris (synonym Cyanogryllacris, with B. globiceps now included in Glolarnaca) and Marthogryllacris.

== Species ==
The Orthoptera Species File lists:

superspecies fumigata (Haan, 1843)

1. Capnogryllacris alivittata (Griffini, 1911)
2. Capnogryllacris elongata (Fritze, 1908)
3. Capnogryllacris fumigata (Haan, 1843) (3 subspecies)
  - type species (as Locusta fumigata Haan = C. fumigata fumigata)
4. Capnogryllacris funebris (Brunner von Wattenwyl, 1898)
5. Capnogryllacris gigantea Karny, 1937
6. Capnogryllacris nigripennis (Gerstaecker, 1860) (2 subspecies)
7. Capnogryllacris obscurata Karny, 1937
8. Capnogryllacris pictipes (Karny, 1925)

superspecies rubrocellata Gorochov, 2003

1. Capnogryllacris rubrocellata Gorochov, 2003 - Thailand

superspecies not assigned

1. Capnogryllacris annulicornis (Hebard, 1922)
2. Capnogryllacris basaliatrata (Griffini, 1909)
3. Capnogryllacris buttikoferi (Karny, 1931)
4. Capnogryllacris fasciculata (Pictet & Saussure, 1893) (3 subspecies)
5. Capnogryllacris multifracta (Griffini, 1914)
6. Capnogryllacris primigenii (Griffini, 1918)
7. Capnogryllacris soror (Brunner von Wattenwyl, 1888)
8. Capnogryllacris superba (Brunner von Wattenwyl, 1888)

Note: species in group borneoensis (Haan, 1843) are now placed in the genus Borneogryllacris Karny, 1937
