= Tenuigryllacris =

Scientific classification
- Kingdom: Animalia
- Phylum: Arthropoda
- Class: Insecta
- Order: Orthoptera
- Suborder: Ensifera
- Family: Gryllacrididae
- Subfamily: Gryllacridinae
- Genus: Tenuigryllacris; Li, Yin & He, 2024

Genus of cricket-like animals

External image
- Image at iNaturalist

Tenuigryllacris is a is genus of Asian orthopterans, sometimes known as 'raspy crickets' or 'leaf-folding crickets': in the subfamily Gryllacridinae, with no tribe assigned. This genus now includes the species T. fruhstorferi (Griffini, 1914) from Vietnam, which has been placed previously in the genera Melaneremus and (originally) Neanias; other species are recorded from southern China.

== Species ==
The Orthoptera Species File includes the following:

1. Tenuigryllacris fruhstorferi (Griffini, 1914)
2. Tenuigryllacris hainanensis Luo, Zhang & Bian, 2024
3. Tenuigryllacris huanglianensis Li, Yin & He, 2024 – type species (by original designation)
4. Tenuigryllacris yingjiangensis Li, Yin & He, 2024
