= Melaneremus =

Scientific classification
- Kingdom: Animalia
- Phylum: Arthropoda
- Class: Insecta
- Order: Orthoptera
- Suborder: Ensifera
- Family: Gryllacrididae
- Tribe: Gryllacridini
- Genus: Melaneremus; Karny, 1937

Genus of cricket-like animals

Melaneremus is a genus of Orthopterans, sometimes known as 'leaf-folding crickets' in the subfamily Gryllacridinae and tribe Gryllacridini. The recorded distribution (probably incomplete) is: the Indian subcontinent, China, Indochina, western Malesia and western Pacific islands.

== Species ==
The Orthoptera Species File lists:

1. Melaneremus atrotectus (Brunner von Wattenwyl, 1888)
  type species (as Eremus atro-tectus Brunner von Wattenwyl)
2. Melaneremus borneensis (Karny, 1925)
3. Melaneremus canillii (Griffini, 1915)
4. Melaneremus fuscoterminatus (Brunner von Wattenwyl, 1888)
5. Melaneremus harmandi (Griffini, 1912)
6. Melaneremus henryi Karny, 1937
7. Melaneremus javanicus (Karny, 1924)
8. Melaneremus kempi (Griffini, 1914)
9. Melaneremus kosraensis Vickery & Kevan, 1999
10. Melaneremus laticeps (Karny, 1926)
11. Melaneremus marianae Vickery & Kevan, 1999
12. Melaneremus nigrosignatus (Brunner von Wattenwyl, 1893)
13. Melaneremus philippinus (Griffini, 1908)
14. Melaneremus pupulus (Bolívar, 1900)
15. Melaneremus saiensis Vickery & Kevan, 1999
16. Melaneremus sikkimensis Ingrisch, 2018

Note:

- Melaneremus fruhstorferi (Griffini, 1914), from Vietnam, has now been placed in the new (2024) genus Tenuigryllacris Li, Yin & He, 2024.
- Melaneremus bellus Tan & Wahab, 2018, from Brunei, is now in genus Monseremus
- Melaneremus bilobus Bey-Bienko, 1957, from southern China, is now in genus Homogryllacris
