= Asarcogryllacris =

Scientific classification
- Kingdom: Animalia
- Phylum: Arthropoda
- Class: Insecta
- Order: Orthoptera
- Suborder: Ensifera
- Family: Gryllacrididae
- Subfamily: Hyperbaeninae
- Tribe: Asarcogryllacridini
- Genus: Asarcogryllacris; Karny, 1937

Synonyms
- Asacogryllacris Gorochov, 2005

Genus of cricket-like animals

Asarcogryllacris is an Asian genus of Orthopterans, sometimes known as 'leaf-folding crickets': in the subfamily Gryllacridinae and tribe Asarcogryllacridini. Species have been recorded from Indochina and west Malesia.

== Species ==
The Orthoptera Species File lists:

1. Asarcogryllacris aequatorialis Gorochov, 2005 - Sumatra
2. Asarcogryllacris anastomotica Karny, 1937 - Borneo
3. Asarcogryllacris brevis Ingrisch, 2018 - Java
4. Asarcogryllacris jambiensis Gorochov, 2005
5. Asarcogryllacris javaensis Gorochov, 2005
6. Asarcogryllacris kerinciensis Gorochov, 2005
7. Asarcogryllacris macilenta Pictet & Saussure, 1893 - type species
  (as Gryllacris macilentus Pictet & Saussure = A. macilenta macilenta from Java)
8. Asarcogryllacris maxima Gorochov, 2005
9. Asarcogryllacris minima Gorochov, 2005
10. Asarcogryllacris parapat Ingrisch, 2018 - Sumatra
11. Asarcogryllacris robusta Ingrisch, 2018 - Vietnam
