= Dialarnaca =

Scientific classification
- Domain: Eukaryota
- Kingdom: Animalia
- Phylum: Arthropoda
- Class: Insecta
- Order: Orthoptera
- Suborder: Ensifera
- Family: Gryllacrididae
- Subfamily: Hyperbaeninae
- Tribe: Asarcogryllacridini
- Genus: Dialarnaca; Gorochov, 2005

Genus of cricket-like animals

External image
- Images at iNaturalist

Dialarnaca is a genus of Asian Orthopterans sometimes known as "leaf-folding-" or "raspy-crickets", in the subfamily Hyperbaeninae and tribe Asarcogryllacridini, was erected by Andrey Gorochov in 2005. Species have been recorded from the Philippines, Hainan and Yunnan province.

== Species ==
The Orthoptera Species File lists:

1. Dialarnaca longicerca Shi & Bian, 2016 - Hainan island
2. Dialarnaca roseola Gorochov, 2005 - type species - Philippines
3. Dialarnaca zhoui Shi & Bian, 2016

Note: Dialarnaca quadrateprocera is now Siamgryllacris quadrateprocera (Bian, Zhu & Shi, 2017)
