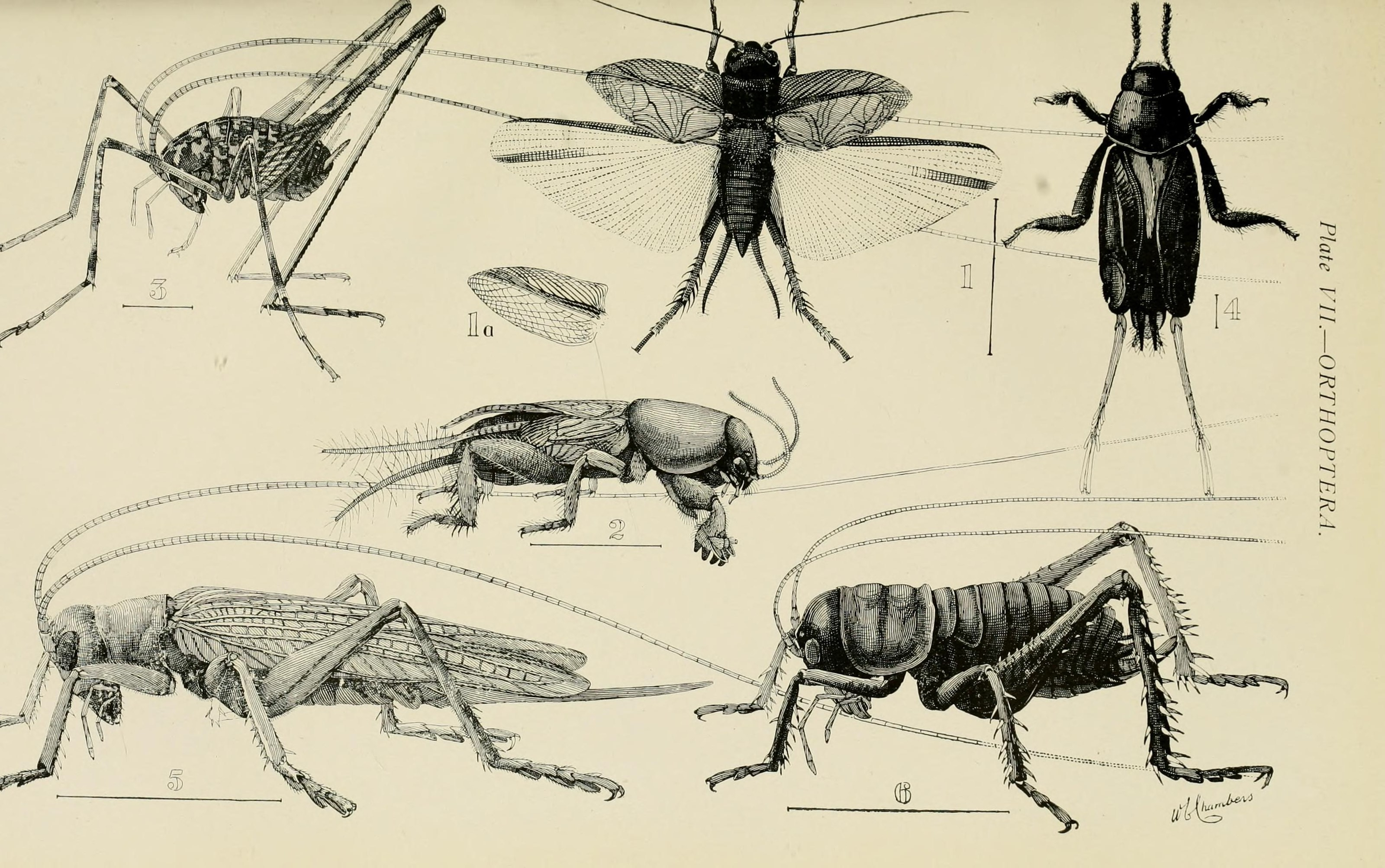
- Australian Orthopterans: Paragryllacris combusta is No. 5 (bottom left)

Scientific classification
- Domain: Eukaryota
- Kingdom: Animalia
- Phylum: Arthropoda
- Class: Insecta
- Order: Orthoptera
- Suborder: Ensifera
- Family: Gryllacrididae
- Subfamily: Hyperbaeninae
- Tribe: Paragryllacridini
- Genus: Paragryllacris
- Species: P. combusta

Binomial name
- Paragryllacris combusta (Gerstäcker, 1860)

= Paragryllacris combusta =

Species of cricket-like animal

Paragryllacris combusta or the striped raspy cricket is a species of cricket found in Australia.
