= Lyperogryllacris =

Scientific classification
- Domain: Eukaryota
- Kingdom: Animalia
- Phylum: Arthropoda
- Class: Insecta
- Order: Orthoptera
- Suborder: Ensifera
- Family: Gryllacrididae
- Subfamily: Gryllacridinae
- Tribe: Gryllacridini
- Genus: Lyperogryllacris; Karny, 1937

Genus of insects

Lyperogryllacris is a genus of Orthopterans, sometimes known as 'leaf-folding crickets' in the tribe Gryllacridini. The recorded distribution is from Indochina, and western Malesia.

== Species ==
The Orthoptera Species File lists:

1. Lyperogryllacris bodenklossi (Karny, 1926)
2. Lyperogryllacris caudelli (Karny, 1929)
3. Lyperogryllacris forcipata Ingrisch, 2018
4. Lyperogryllacris khuntan Ingrisch, 2018
5. Lyperogryllacris luctuosa (Brunner von Wattenwyl, 1888)
  - type species (as Gryllacris luctuosa Brunner von Wattenwyl, locality Lahat, Sumatra)
6. Lyperogryllacris maculipes (Walker, 1869)
7. Lyperogryllacris mjobergi (Karny, 1925)
8. Lyperogryllacris moultoni (Griffini, 1911)
9. Lyperogryllacris nieuwenhuisi (Karny, 1931)
10. Lyperogryllacris ocellata Ingrisch, 2018
11. Lyperogryllacris robinsoni (Karny, 1926)
12. Lyperogryllacris unicolor (Karny, 1931)
13. Lyperogryllacris variegata (Karny, 1931)
