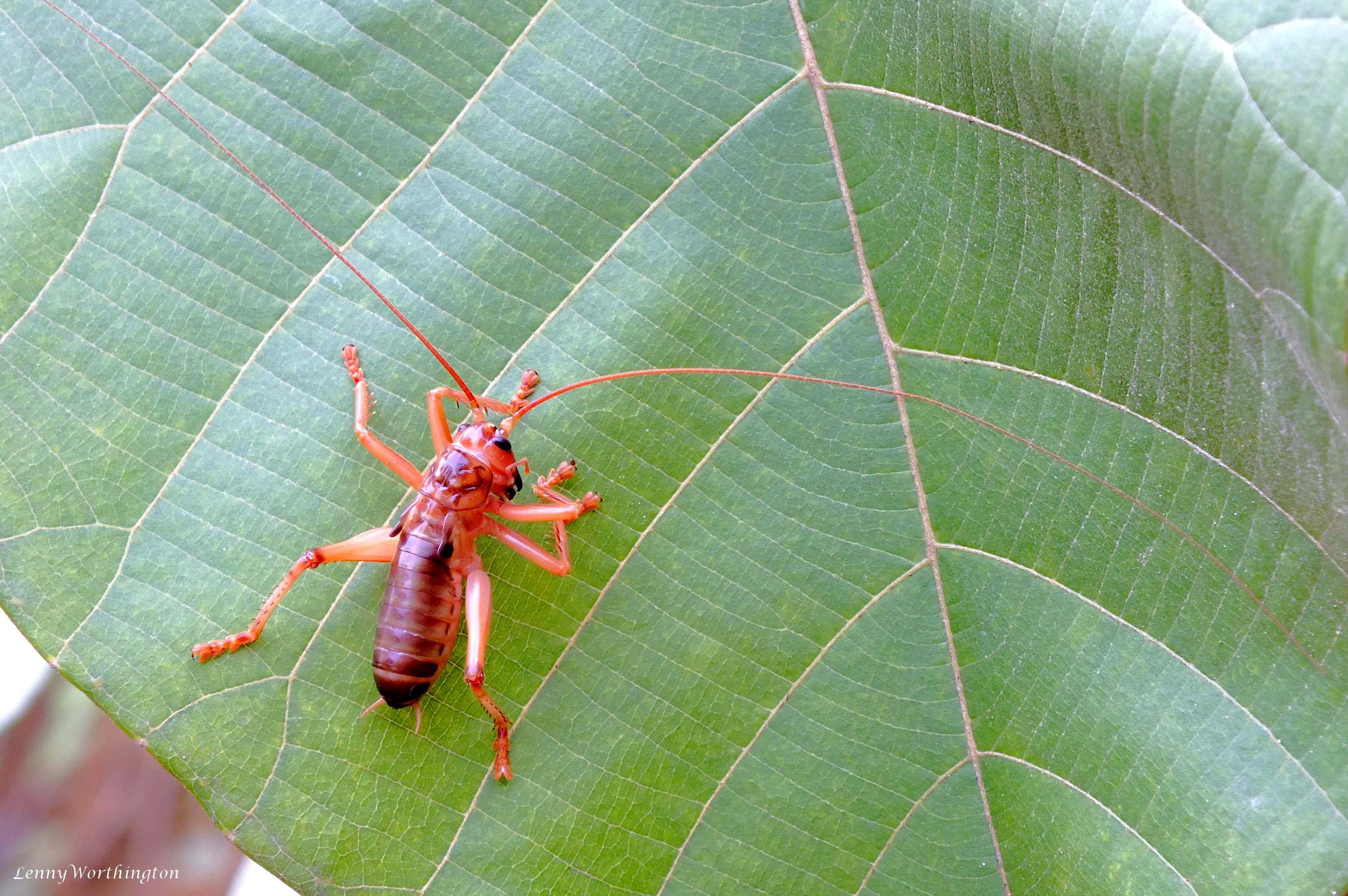

Scientific classification
- Domain: Eukaryota
- Kingdom: Animalia
- Phylum: Arthropoda
- Class: Insecta
- Order: Orthoptera
- Suborder: Ensifera
- Family: Gryllacrididae
- Tribe: Capnogryllacridini
- Genus: Diaphanogryllacris; Karny, 1937

= Diaphanogryllacris =

Genus of cricket-like animals

Diaphanogryllacris is a genus of Orthopterans, sometimes known as 'leaf-folding crickets' in the subfamily Hyperbaeninae and tribe Capnogryllacridini. The recorded distribution is: the Indian subcontinent, China, Indochina, western Malesia up to Sulawesi.

== Species ==
The Orthoptera Species File lists:

- Diaphanogryllacris adunca Gorochov & Dawwrueng, 2015
- Diaphanogryllacris aequalis (Walker, 1859)
- Diaphanogryllacris albifrons Gorochov & Woznessenskij, 2000
- Diaphanogryllacris annamita (Griffini, 1909)
- Diaphanogryllacris annandalei (Griffini, 1914)
- Diaphanogryllacris barkudensis (Chopard, 1924)
- Diaphanogryllacris bezborodovi Gorochov & Dawwrueng, 2015
- Diaphanogryllacris brevispina Du, Bian & Shi, 2016
- Diaphanogryllacris collaris (Walker, 1869)
- Diaphanogryllacris corporaali (Willemse, 1927)
- Diaphanogryllacris dravida (Karny, 1929)
- Diaphanogryllacris foveolatis Du, Bian & Shi, 2016
- Diaphanogryllacris gladiator (Fabricius, 1793)
- Diaphanogryllacris gravelyi (Griffini, 1914)
- Diaphanogryllacris incavatis Du, Bian & Shi, 2016
- Diaphanogryllacris inflatis Du, Bian & Shi, 2016
- Diaphanogryllacris insignis Gorochov & Woznessenskij, 2000
- Diaphanogryllacris laeta (Walker, 1869)
- Diaphanogryllacris macroxiphus (Hebard, 1922)
- Diaphanogryllacris normalis Gorochov & Woznessenskij, 2000
- Diaphanogryllacris opulenta Ingrisch, 2018
- Diaphanogryllacris orlovi Gorochov & Dawwrueng, 2015
- Diaphanogryllacris panfilovi Gorochov & Woznessenskij, 2000
- Diaphanogryllacris panitvongi Gorochov, Dawwrueng & Artchawakom, 2015
- Diaphanogryllacris pellucens Gorochov & Woznessenskij, 2000
- Diaphanogryllacris postica (Walker, 1869)
- Diaphanogryllacris propria Gorochov & Woznessenskij, 2000
- Diaphanogryllacris recta Ingrisch, 2018
- Diaphanogryllacris simulator Gorochov & Woznessenskij, 2000
- Diaphanogryllacris sinuata Ingrisch, 2018
- Diaphanogryllacris tibialis (Serville, 1838)
- Diaphanogryllacris translucens (Serville, 1838)
  type species (as Gryllacris translucens Serville = D. translucens translucens; locality Java)
- Diaphanogryllacris trinotata (Walker, 1870)
