= Microlarnaca =

Scientific classification
- Domain: Eukaryota
- Kingdom: Animalia
- Phylum: Arthropoda
- Class: Insecta
- Order: Orthoptera
- Suborder: Ensifera
- Family: Gryllacrididae
- Tribe: Gryllacridini
- Genus: Microlarnaca; Gorochov, 2004

Genus of cricket-like animals

External image
- Image at iNaturalist

Microlarnaca is a genus of Orthopterans, sometimes known as 'leaf-folding crickets' in the subfamily Gryllacridinae and tribe Gryllacridini. The recorded distribution is from localities in China and Vietnam.

The prefix "Micro-" indicates that these Orthopterans are smaller but similar to the genus Larnaca. There are a number of similar genera, described from Vietnam by AV Gorochov, and the Orthoptera Species File indicates that other locality records and possibly other species have yet to be discovered in the Indo-China region.

== Species ==
The Orthoptera Species File lists:

1. Microlarnaca dicrana (Bey-Bienko, 1962) - Jinping, Yunnan, China
2. Microlarnaca fansipan Gorochov, 2004
  type species (locality: Fan Si Pan Mountain, Sa Pa District, Lao Cai Province, Vietnam)
3. Microlarnaca zhengi Lu & Bian, 2021 - Guilin, China
