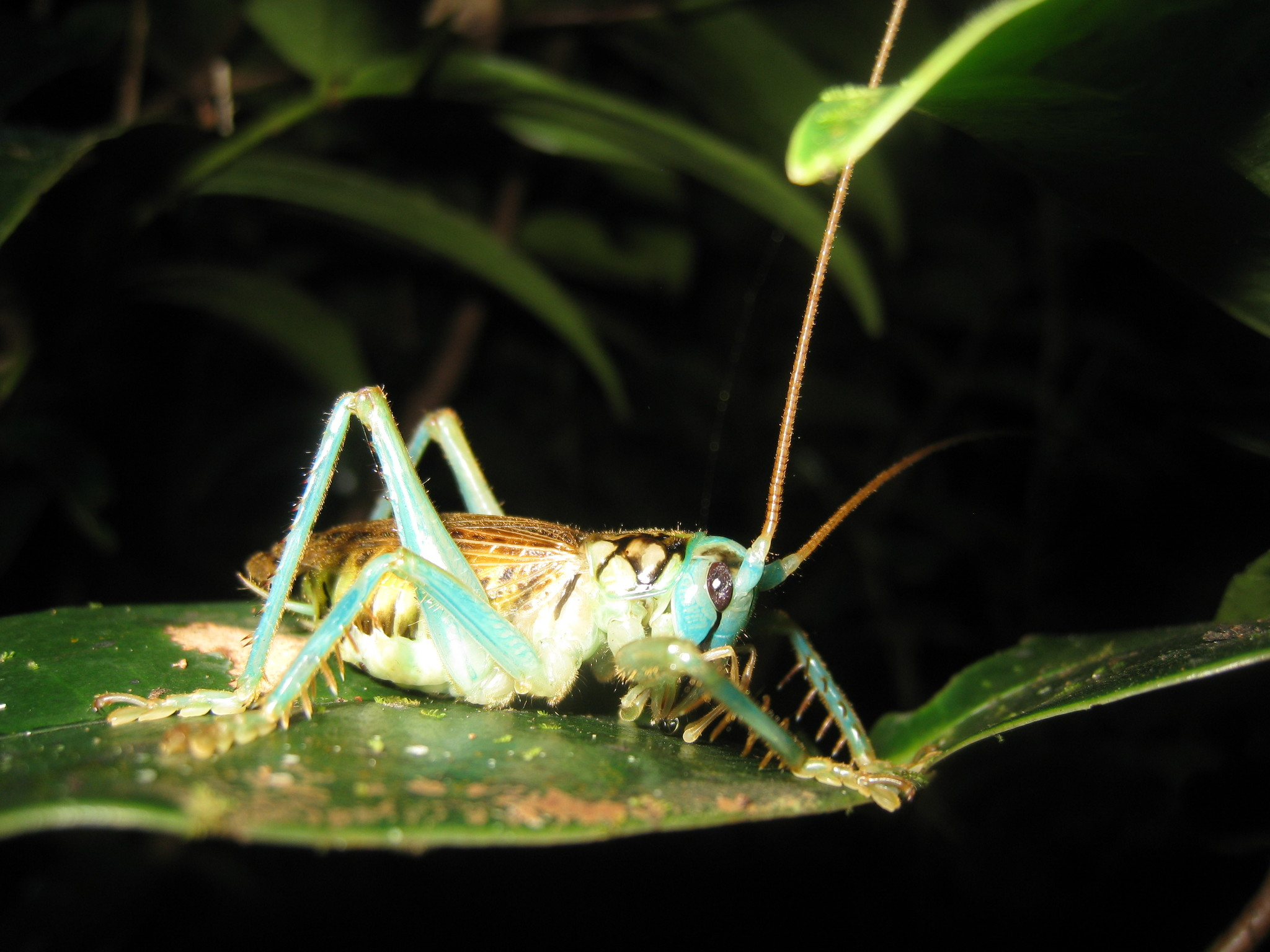
- Eugryllacris panteli

Scientific classification
- Kingdom: Animalia
- Phylum: Arthropoda
- Class: Insecta
- Order: Orthoptera
- Suborder: Ensifera
- Family: Gryllacrididae
- Subfamily: Gryllacridinae
- Tribe: Gryllacridini
- Genus: Eugryllacris; Karny, 1937

= Eugryllacris =

Genus of insects

Eugryllacris is a genus of leaf-folding crickets in the tribe Gryllacridini. The recorded distribution is: the Indian subcontinent, China, western Indochina, western Malesia up to the Maluku Islands; a number of species recently transferred elsewhere in the subfamily, including the new (2024) genus Radigryllacris.

== Species ==
The Orthoptera Species File lists:

1. Eugryllacris comotti (Griffini, 1908)
2. Eugryllacris gandaki Ingrisch, 2018
3. Eugryllacris inversa Ingrisch, 2018
4. Eugryllacris loriae (Griffini, 1908)
5. Eugryllacris maculipennis (Stål, 1877)
6. Eugryllacris moesta (Brunner von Wattenwyl, 1888)
7. Eugryllacris moestissima (Brunner von Wattenwyl, 1888)
8. Eugryllacris panteli (Bolívar, 1900)
9. Eugryllacris poultoniana (Griffini, 1909)
10. Eugryllacris princeps (Stål, 1877)
11. Eugryllacris ruficeps (Serville, 1831)- type species (as Gryllacris ruficeps Serville = E. ruficeps ruficeps locality Java – illustrated)
12. Eugryllacris sarawaccensis (Karny, 1928)
13. Eugryllacris sordida (Fritze, 1908)
14. Eugryllacris viridescens (Walker, 1870)
15. Eugryllacris vittipes (Walker, 1869)
