= Vuilletia =

Scientific classification
- Kingdom: Animalia
- Phylum: Arthropoda
- Class: Insecta
- Order: Thysanoptera
- Family: Phlaeothripidae
- Genus: Vuilletia; Karny, 1923

Type species
- Trichothrips houardi Vuillet, 1914

Genus of thrips

Vuilletia is a monotypic genus of thrips in the family Phlaeothripidae. The sole species is Vuilletia houardi, known from West Africa (Mali, Gambia, and Burkina Faso).
