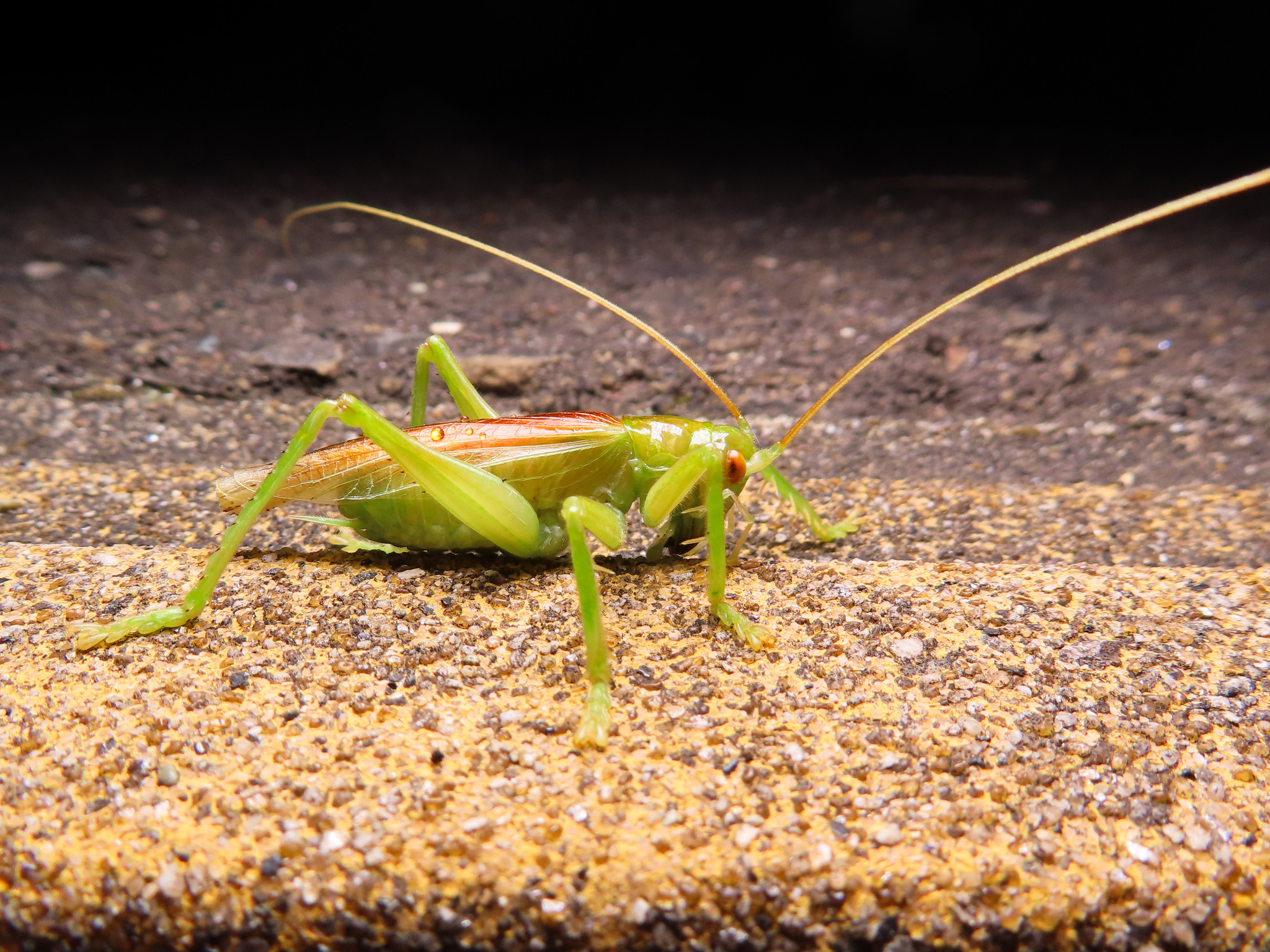
- Radigryllacris japonica (male)

Scientific classification
- Kingdom: Animalia
- Phylum: Arthropoda
- Clade: Pancrustacea
- Class: Insecta
- Order: Orthoptera
- Suborder: Ensifera
- Family: Gryllacrididae
- Subfamily: Gryllacridinae
- Genus: Radigryllacris; Li, Yin & He, 2024

= Radigryllacris =

Genus of cricket-like animals

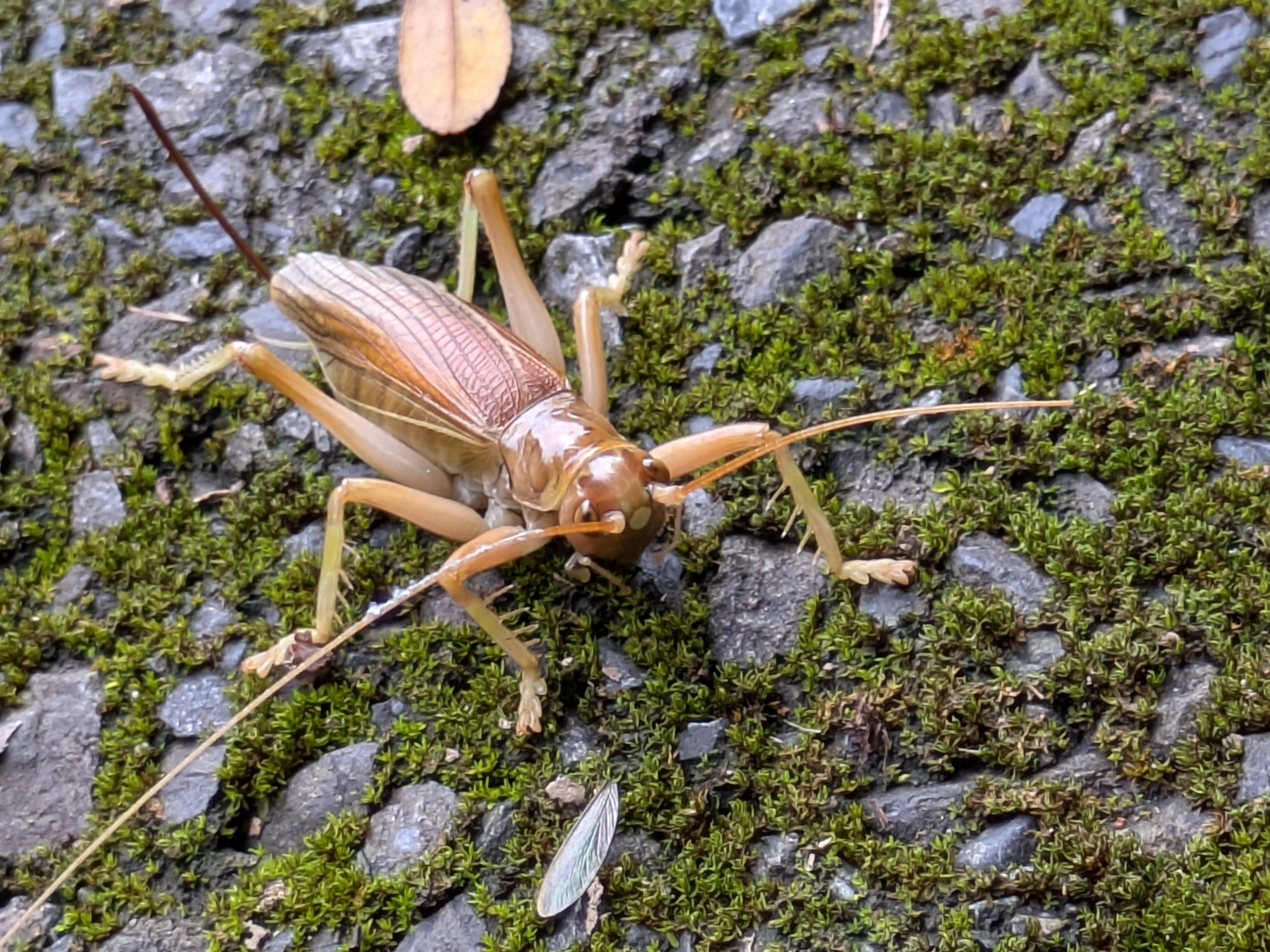
Radigryllacris okadai (female)

Radigryllacris is a genus of East Asian Orthopterans, sometimes known as 'raspy crickets' or 'leaf-folding crickets': in the subfamily Gryllacridinae, with no tribe assigned; it includes species previously placed in other genera such as: Eugryllacris, Ocellarnaca, Prosopogryllacris and Niphetogryllacris.

== Species ==
The Orthoptera Species File includes the following species from Japan, Korea, China and Vietnam:

1. Radigryllacris bifoliata (Bian & Shi, 2016)
2. Radigryllacris cylindrigera (Karny, 1926)
3. Radigryllacris elongata (Bian & Shi, 2016)
4. Radigryllacris fanjingshanensis (Bian & Shi, 2016)
5. Radigryllacris forficata (Pang, Zhang & Bian, 2023)
6. Radigryllacris iriomote (Gorochov, 2002)
7. Radigryllacris japonica (Matsumura & Shiraki, 1908)
8. Radigryllacris lobulis (Bian & Shi, 2016)
9. Radigryllacris longifissa (Bian & Shi, 2016)
10. Radigryllacris longiproceris (Pang, Zhang & Bian, 2023)
11. Radigryllacris mingzheni Pang, Luo & Bian, 2024
12. Radigryllacris nigriabdominis (Bin & Bian, 2021)
13. Radigryllacris okadai (Ichikawa, 2001)
14. Radigryllacris rotundimacula (Ichikawa, 2001)
15. Radigryllacris simulans (Ichikawa, 2001)
16. Radigryllacris trabicauda (Ingrisch, 2018)
17. Radigryllacris vermicauda (Ingrisch, 2018)
18. Radigryllacris xiei (Bian & Shi, 2016) – type species (as Eugryllacris xiei Bian & Shi, 2016)
