= Metriogryllacris =

Scientific classification
- Kingdom: Animalia
- Phylum: Arthropoda
- Class: Insecta
- Order: Orthoptera
- Suborder: Ensifera
- Family: Gryllacrididae
- Tribe: Gryllacridini
- Genus: Metriogryllacris; Karny, 1937

Genus of cricket-like animals

Metriogryllacris is a genus of Orthopterans, sometimes known as 'leaf-folding crickets' in the subfamily Gryllacridinae, tribe Gryllacridini and the genus group Metriogryllacrae Cadena-Castañeda, 2019. The recorded distribution is currently: Japan, Korea, China (with new discoveries in Hainan Island), Vietnam, with Java and Sulawesi in Malesia.

== Species ==
The Orthoptera Species File lists:

subgenus Metriogryllacris Karny, 1937

- species group amitarum (Griffini, 1914)
1. Metriogryllacris amitarum (Griffini, 1914)
2. Metriogryllacris distincta Gorochov, 2004
3. Metriogryllacris nigrilimbis Liu & Bian, 2021
- species group fida Gorochov, 2002
1. Metriogryllacris comes Gorochov, 2002
2. Metriogryllacris fasciata (Ichikawa, 2001)
3. Metriogryllacris fida Gorochov, 2002
4. Metriogryllacris magna (Matsumura & Shiraki, 1908)
5. Metriogryllacris tigris Kim, 2014
- species group gialai Gorochov, 2004
1. Metriogryllacris alia Gorochov, 2004
2. Metriogryllacris gialai Gorochov, 2004
3. Metriogryllacris microptila Gorochov, 2004
- species group permodesta (Griffini, 1914)
1. Metriogryllacris bavi Gorochov, 2004
2. Metriogryllacris darevskyi Gorochov, 2004
3. Metriogryllacris orlovi Gorochov, 2004
4. Metriogryllacris permodesta (Griffini, 1914) - type species (as Gryllacris permodesta Griffini; locality: Mau Son Mountain, Lang Son Province, Vietnam)
5. Metriogryllacris tamdao Gorochov, 2004
- species group not assigned:
1. Metriogryllacris libera (Karny, 1929)
2. Metriogryllacris prunulis Pang, Luo & Bian, 2024
3. Metriogryllacris spinulosa Pang, Luo & Bian, 2024
4. Metriogryllacris triquetris Pang, Luo & Bian, 2024

subgenus Xiphilarnaca Ingrisch, 2018

- monotypic Metriogryllacris xiphiura (Karny, 1928) from Java
