= Glomeremus =

Scientific classification
- Domain: Eukaryota
- Kingdom: Animalia
- Phylum: Arthropoda
- Class: Insecta
- Order: Orthoptera
- Suborder: Ensifera
- Family: Gryllacrididae
- Tribe: Ametroidini
- Genus: Glomeremus; Karny, 1937

Species
- See text

Genus of cricket-like animals

External image
- Images at iNaturalist

Glomeremus is a genus of African Orthopterans in the subfamily Gryllacridinae and tribe Ametroidini.

== Species ==
- Glomeremus brevifalcatus
- Glomeremus capitatus
- Glomeremus chimaera
- Glomeremus falcifer
- Glomeremus feanus
- Glomeremus glomerinus
- Glomeremus kilimandjaricus
- Glomeremus marginatus
- Glomeremus mediopictus
- Glomeremus nitidus
- Glomeremus obtusus
- Glomeremus orchidophilus
- Glomeremus paraorchidophilus
- Glomeremus pileatus
- Glomeremus shelfordi
- Glomeremus sphingoides
- Glomeremus sphinx
- Glomeremus tikasignatus
