= Ultragryllacris =

Scientific classification
- Domain: Eukaryota
- Kingdom: Animalia
- Phylum: Arthropoda
- Class: Insecta
- Order: Orthoptera
- Suborder: Ensifera
- Family: Gryllacrididae
- Subfamily: Hyperbaeninae
- Tribe: Capnogryllacridini
- Genus: Ultragryllacris; Gorochov & Dawwrueng, 2015

Genus of insects

External image
- Images at iNaturalist

Ultragryllacris is a genus of Asian Orthopterans sometimes known as "leaf-folding-" or "raspy-crickets", in the subfamily Hyperbaeninae and tribe Capnogryllacridini; it was erected by Andrey Gorochov and Pattarawich Dawwrueng in 2015. Species records (possibly incomplete) have been from Thailand and Yunnan province.

== Species ==
The Orthoptera Species File lists:

1. Ultragryllacris alboclypeata Gorochov & Dawwrueng, 2015
2. Ultragryllacris chandra Dawwrueng, Gorochov & Suwannapoom, 2023
3. Ultragryllacris intermediata Dawwrueng, Gorochov & Suwannapoom, 2023
4. Ultragryllacris jiaranaisakuli Dawwrueng, Gorochov & Suwannapoom, 2023
5. Ultragryllacris nan Ingrisch, 2018
6. Ultragryllacris pulchra Gorochov & Dawwrueng, 2015 - type species
7. Ultragryllacris rubricapitis Bin & Bian, 2021
