= Phryganogryllacris =

Scientific classification
- Domain: Eukaryota
- Kingdom: Animalia
- Phylum: Arthropoda
- Class: Insecta
- Order: Orthoptera
- Suborder: Ensifera
- Family: Gryllacrididae
- Subfamily: Hyperbaeninae
- Tribe: Phryganogryllacridini
- Genus: Phryganogryllacris; Karny, 1937

Genus of cricket-like animals

Phryganogryllacris is a genus of Asian Orthopterans, sometimes known as "leaf-folding-" or "raspy-crickets", in the subfamily Hyperbaeninae and tribe Phryganogryllacridini. Species have been recorded from: India, China, Indochina, Malesia, through to New Guinea.

== Species ==
The Orthoptera Species File lists:

1. Phryganogryllacris arctata Walker, 1869
2. Phryganogryllacris arctatiformis Karny, 1925
3. Phryganogryllacris aruana Karny, 1931
4. Phryganogryllacris bengalensis Griffini, 1913
5. Phryganogryllacris brevipennis Li, Liu & Li, 2016
6. Phryganogryllacris brevixipha Brunner von Wattenwyl, 1893
7. Phryganogryllacris cambodjana Karny, 1929
8. Phryganogryllacris differens Griffini, 1908
9. Phryganogryllacris discus Gorochov, 2008
10. Phryganogryllacris extensa Ingrisch, 2018
11. Phryganogryllacris fanjingshanensis Li, Liu & Li, 2016
12. Phryganogryllacris gialaiensis Gorochov, 2005
13. Phryganogryllacris griseola Karny, 1930
14. Phryganogryllacris grobbeni Karny, 1925
15. Phryganogryllacris hubeiensis Li, Liu & Li, 2016
16. Phryganogryllacris interrupta Li, Liu & Li, 2014
17. Phryganogryllacris lobulata Gorochov, 2005
18. Phryganogryllacris longicerca Li, Liu & Li, 2014
19. Phryganogryllacris mascata Karny, 1937
20. Phryganogryllacris mellii Karny, 1926
21. Phryganogryllacris mioccana Karny, 1935
22. Phryganogryllacris nivea Brunner von Wattenwyl, 1888
23. Phryganogryllacris nonangulata Ingrisch, 2018
24. Phryganogryllacris parva Li, Liu & Li, 2014
25. Phryganogryllacris phryganoides Haan, 1842
  type species (as Gryllacris phryganoides de Haan = P. phryganoides phryganoides)
26. Phryganogryllacris problematica Gorochov, 2005
27. Phryganogryllacris pusilla Karny, 1926
28. Phryganogryllacris separata Karny, 1926
29. Phryganogryllacris sheni Niu & Shi, 1999
30. Phryganogryllacris sichuanensis Li, Liu & Li, 2014
31. Phryganogryllacris sigillata Li, Liu & Li, 2016
32. Phryganogryllacris simalurensis Karny, 1931
33. Phryganogryllacris sphegidipraeda Karny, 1924
34. Phryganogryllacris subangulata Gorochov, 2005
35. Phryganogryllacris subrectis Matsumura & Shiraki, 1908
36. Phryganogryllacris superangulata Gorochov, 2005
37. Phryganogryllacris teuthroides Karny, 1925
38. Phryganogryllacris trusmadi Gorochov, 2008
39. Phryganogryllacris vinhphuensis Gorochov, 2005
40. Phryganogryllacris xiai Liu & Zhang, 2001
