= Androthrips =

Scientific classification
- Kingdom: Animalia
- Phylum: Arthropoda
- Class: Insecta
- Order: Thysanoptera
- Family: Phlaeothripidae
- Genus: Androthrips; Karny, 1911

Genus of thrips

Androthrips is a genus of thrips in the family Phlaeothripidae, first described by Heinrich Hugo Karny in 1911.

== Species ==
- Androthrips coimbatorensis
- Androthrips collaris
- Androthrips crus
- Androthrips flavipes
- Androthrips flavitibia
- Androthrips guiyangensis
- Androthrips kurosawai
- Androthrips melastomae
- Androthrips monsterae
- Androthrips obscuratus
- Androthrips ochraceus
- Androthrips ramachandrai
