= Ocellarnaca =

Scientific classification
- Kingdom: Animalia
- Phylum: Arthropoda
- Class: Insecta
- Order: Orthoptera
- Suborder: Ensifera
- Family: Gryllacrididae
- Tribe: Gryllacridini
- Genus: Ocellarnaca; Gorochov, 2004

Genus of cricket-like animals

Ocellarnaca is a genus of Orthopterans, sometimes known as 'leaf-folding crickets' in the subfamily Gryllacridinae, tribe Gryllacridini and the genus group Gryllacrae Blanchard, 1845. The recorded distribution is currently: China including Hainan and Vietnam.

== Species ==
The Orthoptera Species File lists:

1. Ocellarnaca angulata Gorochov, 2004
2. Ocellarnaca braueri (Griffini, 1911)
3. Ocellarnaca brevicauda Li, Fang, Liu & Li, 2014
4. Ocellarnaca conica Bian, Shi & Guo, 2013
5. Ocellarnaca coomani Li, Fang, Liu & Li, 2014
6. Ocellarnaca disjuncta Ingrisch, 2018
7. Ocellarnaca emeiensis Li, Fang, Liu & Li, 2014
8. Ocellarnaca furcifera (Karny, 1926)
9. Ocellarnaca fusca Ingrisch, 2018
10. Ocellarnaca fuscotessellata (Karny, 1926)
11. Ocellarnaca grossa Duan, Chen & Shi, 2023
12. Ocellarnaca hainanensis Pang, Luo & Bian, 2024
13. Ocellarnaca longilobulata Lu, Zhang & Bian, 2022
14. Ocellarnaca longiprotubera Duan, Chen & Shi, 2023
15. Ocellarnaca nigrofemora Shi & Zhu, 2021
16. Ocellarnaca ocellata Gorochov, 2004 - type species (locality: near Buon Luoi village, Gia Lai Province, Vietnam)
17. Ocellarnaca wolffii (Krausze, 1906)

Note: O. xiei Bian & Shi, 2016 was subsequently made the type species of the new (2024) genus Radigryllacris.
