= Marthogryllacris =

Scientific classification
- Domain: Eukaryota
- Kingdom: Animalia
- Phylum: Arthropoda
- Class: Insecta
- Order: Orthoptera
- Suborder: Ensifera
- Family: Gryllacrididae
- Subfamily: Hyperbaeninae
- Tribe: Capnogryllacridini
- Genus: Marthogryllacris; Karny, 1937

Genus of cricket-like animals

External image
- Images at iNaturalist

Marthogryllacris is a genus of Asian Orthopterans, sometimes known as 'leaf-folding crickets', in the subfamily Hyperbaeninae and tribe Capnogryllacridini, erected by Heinrich Hugo Karny in 1937. Species have been recorded from southern China and Indochina.

== Species ==
Some species previously have been placed in Capnogryllacris; the Orthoptera Species File lists:

1. Marthogryllacris bimaculata Li, Liu & Li, 2014 - Yunan
2. Marthogryllacris erythrocephala (Gorochov, 2003) - Vietnam, Yunan
3. Marthogryllacris helocephala (Gorochov, 2003) - Vietnam
4. Marthogryllacris jinpingensis (Zhang & Bian, 2023) - Yunan
5. Marthogryllacris martha (Griffini, 1914) – type species (as Gryllacris martha Griffini) - Laos
6. Marthogryllacris phaeocephala (Gorochov, 2003) - Cambodia, Thailand
7. Marthogryllacris rufonotata Li, Liu & Li, 2014 - Yunan
8. Marthogryllacris sequestris (Liu, Lu & Bian, 2022) - Hainan Is.
9. Marthogryllacris varifrons (Ingrisch, 2018) - Cambodia, Vietnam
10. Marthogryllacris xiangjini Chen, 2024 - Yunan
11. Marthogryllacris xichou (Peng & Bian, 2021) - Yunan, Guangxi
