= Griffiniella =

Scientific classification
- Kingdom: Animalia
- Phylum: Arthropoda
- Clade: Pancrustacea
- Class: Insecta
- Order: Blattodea
- Family: Blaberidae
- Subfamily: Oxyhaloinae
- Tribe: Nauphoetini
- Genus: Griffiniella; Brunner von Wattenwyl, 1865

Genus of cockroaches

Griffiniella is one of several cockroach genera in the subfamily Oxyhaloinae (in the Blaberidae, the giant cockroach or ovoviviparous cockroach family). The genus was described by Heinrich Hugo Karny in 1908, and named by him in honour of the prolific author Dr. Achille Griffini of the Royal Technical Institute of Genoa.

== Species ==
1. G. africana (Saussure 1895)
2. G. heterogamia Karny 1908
3. G. larvalis Princis 1965
4. G. marmorata (Shelford 1910)
