= Apterolarnaca =

Scientific classification
- Domain: Eukaryota
- Kingdom: Animalia
- Phylum: Arthropoda
- Class: Insecta
- Order: Orthoptera
- Suborder: Ensifera
- Family: Gryllacrididae
- Tribe: Ametrini
- Genus: Apterolarnaca; Gorochov, 2004

Genus of cricket-like animals

External image
- Image at iNaturalist

Apterolarnaca is a genus of Orthopterans, sometimes known as 'leaf-folding crickets' in the subfamily Gryllacridinae, tribe Ametrini and genus group Apotrechae Cadena-Castañeda, 2019. Records of occurrence are from southern China and Vietnam.

The prefix "Aptero-" means that these Orthopterans are similar to the genus Larnaca, but have secondarily evolved without wings (becoming apterous). There are a number of similar genera, described from Vietnam by AV Gorochov, and the Orthoptera Species File indicates that other locality records and possibly other species have yet to be discovered in the Indo-China region.

== Species ==
The Orthoptera Species File lists:

subgenus Apterolarnaca Gorochov, 2004

1. Apterolarnaca apta Gorochov, 2004
2. Apterolarnaca huanglianensis Bian & Lu, 2021
3. Apterolarnaca nigrifrontis Bian & Shi, 2016
4. Apterolarnaca quadrimaculata Bian & Shi, 2016
5. Apterolarnaca truncatoloba (Li & Liu, 2015)
6. Apterolarnaca ulla Gorochov, 2004
  type species (locality: Fan Si Pan Mountain, Sa Pa District, Lao Cai Province, Vietnam)

subgenus Bianigryllacris

Auth. Cadena-Castañeda, 2019; all from China

1. Apterolarnaca biloba (Liu, Bi & Zhang, 2010)
2. Apterolarnaca digitata (Liu & Bi, 2008)
3. Apterolarnaca fallax (Liu & Bi, 2008)
4. Apterolarnaca nigrigeniculata (Liu & Yin, 2002)
5. Apterolarnaca parvospinus (Liu & Yin, 2002)
6. Apterolarnaca quadrata (Li & Liu, 2015)
7. Apterolarnaca tenuispinacia Lu, Zhang & Bian, 2022
8. Apterolarnaca transversa (Liu, Bi & Zhang, 2010)
9. Apterolarnaca trilobus (Bian & Shi, 2014)
10. Apterolarnaca xinganensis Lu, Zhang & Bian, 2022
