= Neanias =

Scientific classification
- Kingdom: Animalia
- Phylum: Arthropoda
- Class: Insecta
- Order: Orthoptera
- Suborder: Ensifera
- Family: Gryllacrididae
- Tribe: Gryllacridini
- Genus: Neanias; Brunner von Wattenwyl, 1888

Synonyms
- Neanius Tepper, 1892

Genus of cricket-like animals

Neanias is a genus of Orthopterans, sometimes known as 'leaf-folding crickets' in the subfamily Gryllacridinae and tribe Gryllacridini. The recorded distribution (probably incomplete) is: Indian subcontinent, Japan, Hainan, Indochina, and western Malesia (Sumatra).

== Species ==
The Orthoptera Species File lists:

1. Neanias amplus Gorochov, 2008
2. Neanias angustipennis Gorochov, 2008
3. Neanias atroterminatus Karny, 1937
4. Neanias bezzii Griffini, 1914
5. Neanias erinaceus Gorochov, 2008
6. Neanias medius Gorochov, 2008
7. Neanias ogasawarensis Vickery & Kevan, 1999
8. Neanias parvus Gorochov, 2008
9. Neanias pliginskyi Gorochov, 2008
10. Neanias squamatus Brunner von Wattenwyl, 1888 - type species (by subsequent designation)
11. Neanias subapterus Karny, 1924
12. Neanias virens Ingrisch, 2018

Note: Neanias magnus Matsumura & Shiraki, 1908, from Taiwan, is now placed in genus Metriogryllacris.
