= Hyperbaenus =

- Hyperbaenus ommatostemma

Scientific classification
- Kingdom: Animalia
- Phylum: Arthropoda
- Clade: Pancrustacea
- Class: Insecta
- Order: Orthoptera
- Suborder: Ensifera
- Family: Gryllacrididae
- Subfamily: Hyperbaeninae
- Tribe: Hyperbaenini
- Genus: Hyperbaenus; Brunner von Wattenwyl, 1888

Genus of cricket-like animals

Hyperbaenus is a genus of South American orthopterans, sometimes known as 'leaf-folding crickets', in the family Gryllacridinae. It is the type genus for the tribe Hyperbaenini and the new subfamily Hyperbaeninae.

== Species ==
The following species are recognised in the genus Hyperbaenus:

- Hyperbaenus bohlsii Giglio-Tos, 1895
- Hyperbaenus brevipennis Caudell, 1918
- Hyperbaenus brunneri Karny, 1929
- Hyperbaenus camerani Griffini, 1911
- Hyperbaenus coccinatus Karny, 1937
- Hyperbaenus ebneri Karny, 1932
- Hyperbaenus ensifer Brunner von Wattenwyl, 1888 - type species (locality: Pernambuco, Brazil)
- Hyperbaenus excisus Karny, 1929
- Hyperbaenus festae Griffini, 1896
- Hyperbaenus fiebrigi Griffini, 1908
- Hyperbaenus griffinii Karny, 1932
- Hyperbaenus incisus Karny, 1935
- Hyperbaenus juvenis Brunner von Wattenwyl, 1888
- Hyperbaenus laminatus Ander, 1934
- Hyperbaenus minutipennis Bruner, 1915
- Hyperbaenus ommatostemma Karny, 1929
- Hyperbaenus sjostedti Griffini, 1911
- Hyperbaenus ustulatus Karny, 1929
- Hyperbaenus virgo Brunner von Wattenwyl, 1888
