= Grypothrips =

Scientific classification
- Kingdom: Animalia
- Phylum: Arthropoda
- Class: Insecta
- Order: Thysanoptera
- Family: Phlaeothripidae
- Genus: Grypothrips; Karny, 1924

Genus of thrips

Grypothrips is a genus of thrips in the family Phlaeothripidae.

== Species ==
- Grypothrips cambagei
- Grypothrips curiosus
- Grypothrips darlingi
- Grypothrips mantis
- Grypothrips okrius
- Grypothrips papyrocarpae
