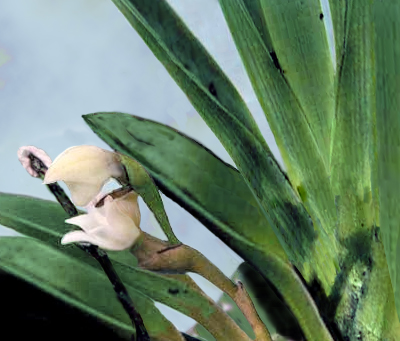
- Angraecum cadetii flower

Scientific classification
- Kingdom: Plantae
- Clade: Tracheophytes
- Clade: Angiosperms
- Clade: Monocots
- Order: Asparagales
- Family: Orchidaceae
- Subfamily: Epidendroideae
- Genus: Angraecum
- Species: A. cadetii

Binomial name
- Angraecum cadetii Bosser

= Angraecum cadetii =

Species of orchid

Angraecum cadetii is a species of orchid endemic to Mauritius and Réunion. It was named after botanist Thérésien Cadet. It is the only known flower known to be pollinated by a cricket, specifically by a species of raspy cricket: Glomeremus orchidophilus.
