= Neolarnaca =

Scientific classification
- Domain: Eukaryota
- Kingdom: Animalia
- Phylum: Arthropoda
- Class: Insecta
- Order: Orthoptera
- Suborder: Ensifera
- Family: Gryllacrididae
- Tribe: Gryllacridini
- Genus: Neolarnaca; Gorochov, 2004

Genus of cricket-like animals

Neolarnaca is a genus of Orthopterans, sometimes known as 'leaf-folding crickets' in the subfamily Gryllacridinae and tribe Gryllacridini. The recorded distribution of this genus is eastern China and Vietnam.

== Species ==
The Orthoptera Species File lists:

- Neolarnaca longipenna Bian & Shi, 2016
- Neolarnaca vera Gorochov, 2004
  - N. vera aurelostria Bian & Shi, 2016
  - N. vera nigrinotum Ingrisch, 2018
  - N. vera vera Gorochov, 2004 - type species (locality: Tam Dao village, Vinh Phu Province, Vietnam)
