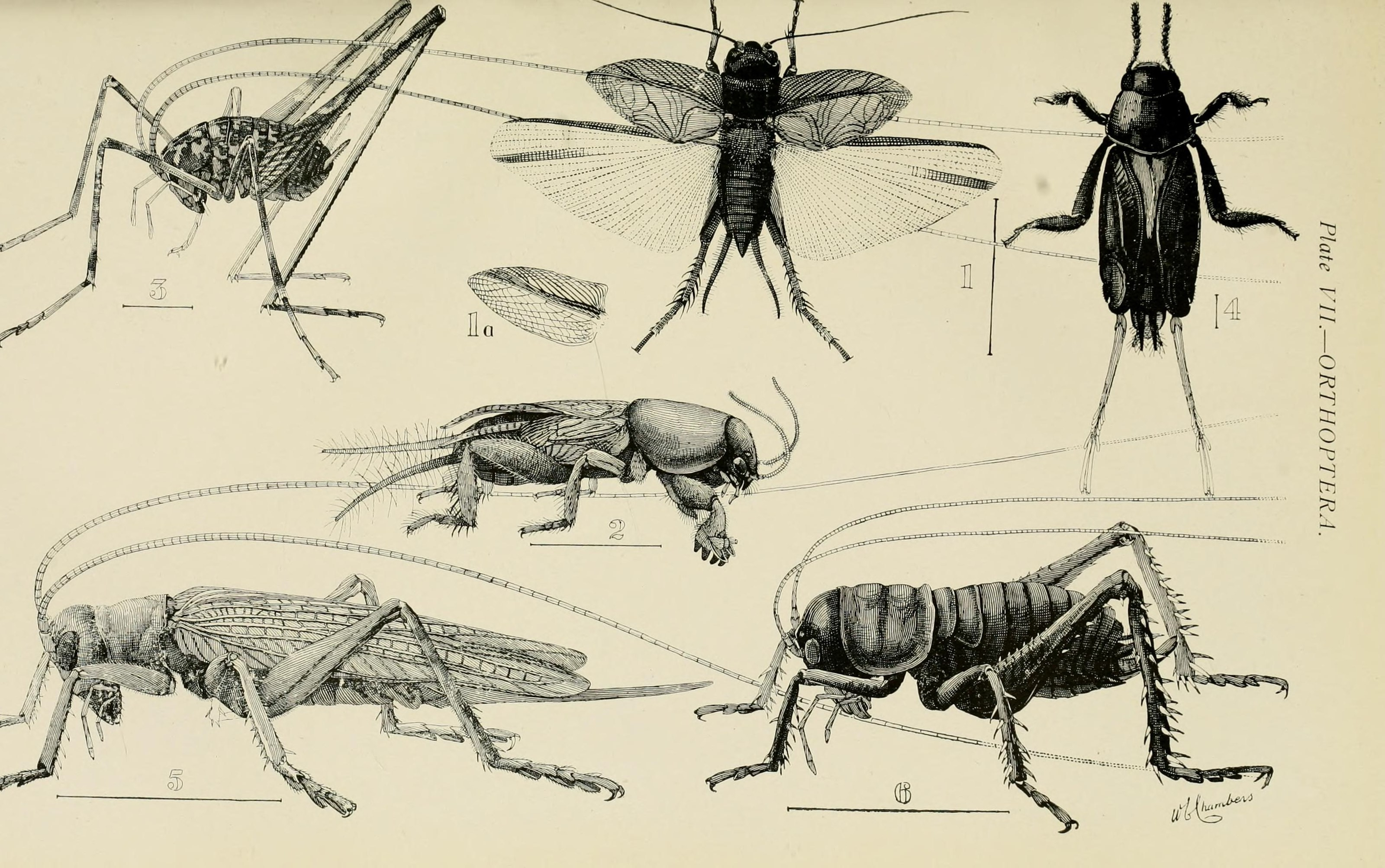
- Australian Orthopterans: Paragryllacris combusta is bottom left

Scientific classification
- Domain: Eukaryota
- Kingdom: Animalia
- Phylum: Arthropoda
- Class: Insecta
- Order: Orthoptera
- Suborder: Ensifera
- Family: Gryllacrididae
- Subfamily: Hyperbaeninae
- Tribe: Paragryllacridini
- Genus: Paragryllacris; Brunner von Wattenwyl, 1888

= Paragryllacris =

Genus of cricket-like animals

Paragryllacris is a genus of Australian Orthopterans, sometimes known as "leaf-folding-" or "raspy-crickets" in the family Gryllacridinae, erected by the Swiss entomologist Carl Brunner von Wattenwyl in 1888. It is fairly typical for its tribe Paragryllacridini. However, in a large comparison of 650 insect species, Australian Raspy Crickets were found to be the insect with the strongest bite.

== Species ==
The Orthoptera Species File lists:

1. Paragryllacris combusta Gerstaecker, 1860
  - type species (locality: Sydney, New South Wales, Australia)
2. Paragryllacris fissa Karny, 1929
3. Paragryllacris griffinii Hebard, 1922
4. Paragryllacris nigrosulcata Karny, 1929
