= Griffiniella heterogamia =

Scientific classification
- Kingdom: Animalia
- Phylum: Arthropoda
- Clade: Pancrustacea
- Class: Insecta
- Order: Blattodea
- Family: Blaberidae
- Tribe: Nauphoetini
- Genus: Griffiniella
- Species: G. heterogamia

Binomial name
- Griffiniella heterogamia Karny, 1908

Synonyms
- Griffiniella kohlsi (Rehn, J. A. G., 1965)

Species of cockroach

Griffiniella heterogamia is a species of cockroach described by Heinrich Hugo Karny in 1908. Its known distribution is limited to the neighboring countries of Namibia and Botswana.

== Karny's description ==
Karny's specimens were collected by German zoologist Leonhard Schultze in 1904 from Sekgoma and Khakhea, in the Kalahari Desert in the Bechuanaland Protectorate (now Botswana). Karny described the ocelli (eye spots) and dorsal abdomen of the species as brown.

Karny's 1908 description include the following measurements:

	Male	Female
Body length	15 mm (0.59 in)	10.5 mm (0.41 in)
Pronotum length	4 mm (0.16 in)	3 mm (0.12 in)
Pronotum width	5.5 mm (0.22 in)	3.5 mm (0.14 in)
Tegmina length	16 mm (0.63 in)	5 mm (0.20 in)

== Rehn's description ==
James A. G. Rehn described specimens of G. heterogamia, collected 121 km (75 miles) southwest of Windhoek in what is now Namibia, as a proposed new species of symbiotic cockroach, Griffiniella kohlsi. The description was published in 1965, after Rehn's death. His proposed name, now considered a synonym of G. heterogamia, was named after Dr. Glen Kohls, who collected individuals of the species living in a large communal nest of the Sociable Weaver (Philetairus socius) bird. The birds first construct a straw roof in isolated, large trees, including kokerboom and camel-thorn, then build many tunnels in the straw, which culminate in nest-chambers for breeding pairs, with scores of pairs living in the same colony.

Rehn's description of Namibian specimens noted the "lappet-like" tegmina (outer forewings), measuring no more than 4.4 mm, and absence of hindwings in both sexes. Karny's description of Botswanan specimens noted winged males with tegmina measuring 16 mm, and flightless females with tegmina measuring 5 mm. Rehn considered Karny's description of the genus Griffiniella, but found "Karny emphasized little in his description which is of value except the dimorphism in alar development, the male of Griffiniella having fully developed tegmina and wings, the female having the former fully formed but reduced in length, the wings apparently lacking."

Rehn's 1965 description, based on 2 female specimens and 9 male specimens, include the following measurements:

	Male	Female
Body length	13.1–18.7 mm (0.52–0.74 in)	11.8–12.0 mm (0.46–0.47 in)
Pronotum length	3.1–3.7 mm (0.12–0.15 in)	2.68 mm (0.11 in)
Pronotum width	4.7–5.6 mm (0.19–0.22 in)	3.7–3.9 mm (0.15–0.15 in)
Tegmina length	2.52–4.4 mm (0.099–0.17 in)	1.89–2.05 mm (0.074–0.081 in)
Tegmina width	1.89–2.37 mm (0.074–0.093 in)	1.10–1.58 mm (0.043–0.062 in)
Caudal femur length	3.1–3.9 mm (0.12–0.15 in)	2.68–2.84 mm (0.11–0.11 in)
