= Stictogryllacris quadripunctata =

Scientific classification
- Domain: Eukaryota
- Kingdom: Animalia
- Phylum: Arthropoda
- Class: Insecta
- Order: Orthoptera
- Suborder: Ensifera
- Family: Gryllacrididae
- Genus: Stictogryllacris
- Species: S. quadripunctata

Binomial name
- Stictogryllacris quadripunctata (Brunner von Wattenwyl, 1888)

Species of cricket-like animal

Stictogryllacris quadripunctata is a species of Orthoptera in the family of Gryllacrididae. The scientific name of the species was first published in 1888 by Brunner von Wattenwyl.
