= Woznessenskia =

Scientific classification
- Domain: Eukaryota
- Kingdom: Animalia
- Phylum: Arthropoda
- Class: Insecta
- Order: Orthoptera
- Suborder: Ensifera
- Family: Gryllacrididae
- Subfamily: Hyperbaeninae
- Tribe: Capnogryllacridini
- Genus: Woznessenskia; Gorochov, 2002

Genus of cricket-like animals

External image
- Image at iNaturalist

Woznessenskia is an Asian genus of Orthopterans, sometimes known as 'leaf-folding crickets', in the subfamily Hyperbaeninae and tribe Capnogryllacridini. Species have been recorded from southern China and Vietnam.

== Species ==
The Orthoptera Species File lists:

- Woznessenskia ampliata Ingrisch, 2018
- Woznessenskia arcoida Guo & Shi, 2011
- Woznessenskia arcuata Gorochov, 2002
- Woznessenskia bavi Ingrisch, 2018
- Woznessenskia bimacula Guo & Shi, 2011
- Woznessenskia brevisa Guo & Shi, 2011
- Woznessenskia combina Shi, Zhu & Wang, 2022
- Woznessenskia curvicauda (Bey-Bienko, 1962)
- Woznessenskia deminuta Gorochov, 2002
- Woznessenskia finitima Gorochov, 2002 – type species, locality Vietnam
- Woznessenskia incurva Shi, Zhu & Wang, 2022
- Woznessenskia procera Shi, Zhu & Wang, 2022
- Woznessenskia truncata Shi, Zhu & Wang, 2022
