= Borneogryllacris =

Scientific classification
- Kingdom: Animalia
- Phylum: Arthropoda
- Clade: Pancrustacea
- Class: Insecta
- Order: Orthoptera
- Suborder: Ensifera
- Family: Gryllacrididae
- Subfamily: Hyperbaeninae
- Tribe: Capnogryllacridini
- Genus: Borneogryllacris; Karny, 1937

Synonyms
- Cyanogryllacris Karny, 1937; Capnogryllacris species group borneoensis (Haan, 1843)

Genus of cricket-like animals

External image
- Images at iNaturalist

Borneogryllacris is a genus of Asian orthopterans, sometimes known as 'leaf-folding crickets', in the subfamily Hyperbaeninae and tribe Capnogryllacridini, erected by Heinrich Hugo Karny in 1937. As its name suggests, species were originally recorded from Borneo, with subsequent finds in Peninsular Malaysia and Indochina.

== Species ==
The Orthoptera Species File lists:

1. Borneogryllacris borneoensis (Haan, 1843)
  - type species (as Locusta (Gryllacris) borneoensis Haan, 1843)
2. Borneogryllacris deschampsi (Griffini, 1914)
3. Borneogryllacris discolor (Karny, 1928)
4. Borneogryllacris fruhstorferi (Griffini, 1908)
5. Borneogryllacris grassii (Griffini, 1912)
6. Borneogryllacris khmerica (Gorochov, 2003)
7. Borneogryllacris plagiata (Walker, 1869)
8. Borneogryllacris sakaerat (Dawwrueng, Gorochov & Artchawakom, 2015)
9. Borneogryllacris thaica (Gorochov & Dawwrueng, 2015)
10. Borneogryllacris xujuni (Zhang & Bian, 2022)
