= Homogryllacris =

Scientific classification
- Domain: Eukaryota
- Kingdom: Animalia
- Phylum: Arthropoda
- Class: Insecta
- Order: Orthoptera
- Suborder: Ensifera
- Family: Gryllacrididae
- Subfamily: Gryllacridinae
- Tribe: Gryllacridini
- Genus: Homogryllacris; Liu, 2007

Genus of insects

Homogryllacris is a genus of Orthopterans, sometimes known as 'leaf-folding crickets' in the tribe Gryllacridini. A key to species is provided by Bian, Jing Liu & Zizhong Yang, which have a recorded distribution in: India, China and Indochina (but locality records may be incomplete).

== Species ==
The Orthoptera Species File lists:

1. Homogryllacris anelytra Shi, Guo & Bian, 2012
2. Homogryllacris armigera Ingrisch, 2018
3. Homogryllacris artinii (Griffini, 1913)
4. Homogryllacris ascenda Shi, Guo & Bian, 2012
5. Homogryllacris biloba (Bey-Bienko, 1957)
6. Homogryllacris brevipenna Du, Bian & Shi, 2016
7. Homogryllacris brevispina Shi, Guo & Bian, 2012
8. Homogryllacris buyssoniana (Griffini, 1912)
9. Homogryllacris curvicauda Du, Bian & Shi, 2016
10. Homogryllacris gladiata Liu, 2007 - type species (locality Suqiyu, Hunan Province)
11. Homogryllacris hamitis Liu & Bian, 2021
12. Homogryllacris kurseonga (Griffini, 1913)
13. Homogryllacris maindroni (Griffini, 1913)
14. Homogryllacris obtusitubera Li, Dou & Shi, 2019
15. Homogryllacris parcibrevipenna Liu, Lu & Bian, 2021
16. Homogryllacris platycis Liu & Bian, 2021
17. Homogryllacris rufovaria Liu, 2007
18. Homogryllacris stabilis Ingrisch, 2018
19. Homogryllacris yunnana Shi, Guo & Bian, 2012
