= Siamgryllacris =

Scientific classification
- Domain: Eukaryota
- Kingdom: Animalia
- Phylum: Arthropoda
- Class: Insecta
- Order: Orthoptera
- Suborder: Ensifera
- Family: Gryllacrididae
- Subfamily: Hyperbaeninae
- Tribe: Phryganogryllacridini
- Genus: Siamgryllacris; Ingrisch, 2018

Genus of cricket-like animals

External image
- Images at iNaturalist

Siamgryllacris is a genus of Asian Orthopterans, sometimes known as "leaf-folding-" or "raspy-crickets", in the subfamily Hyperbaeninae and tribe Phryganogryllacridini, erected by Sigfrid Ingrisch in 2018. Species have been recorded from Thailand and Yunnan province.

== Species ==
The Orthoptera Species File lists:

1. Siamgryllacris quadrateprocera (Bian, Zhu & Shi, 2017) - Yunnan
2. Siamgryllacris rufa Ingrisch, 2018 - type species - Thailand
