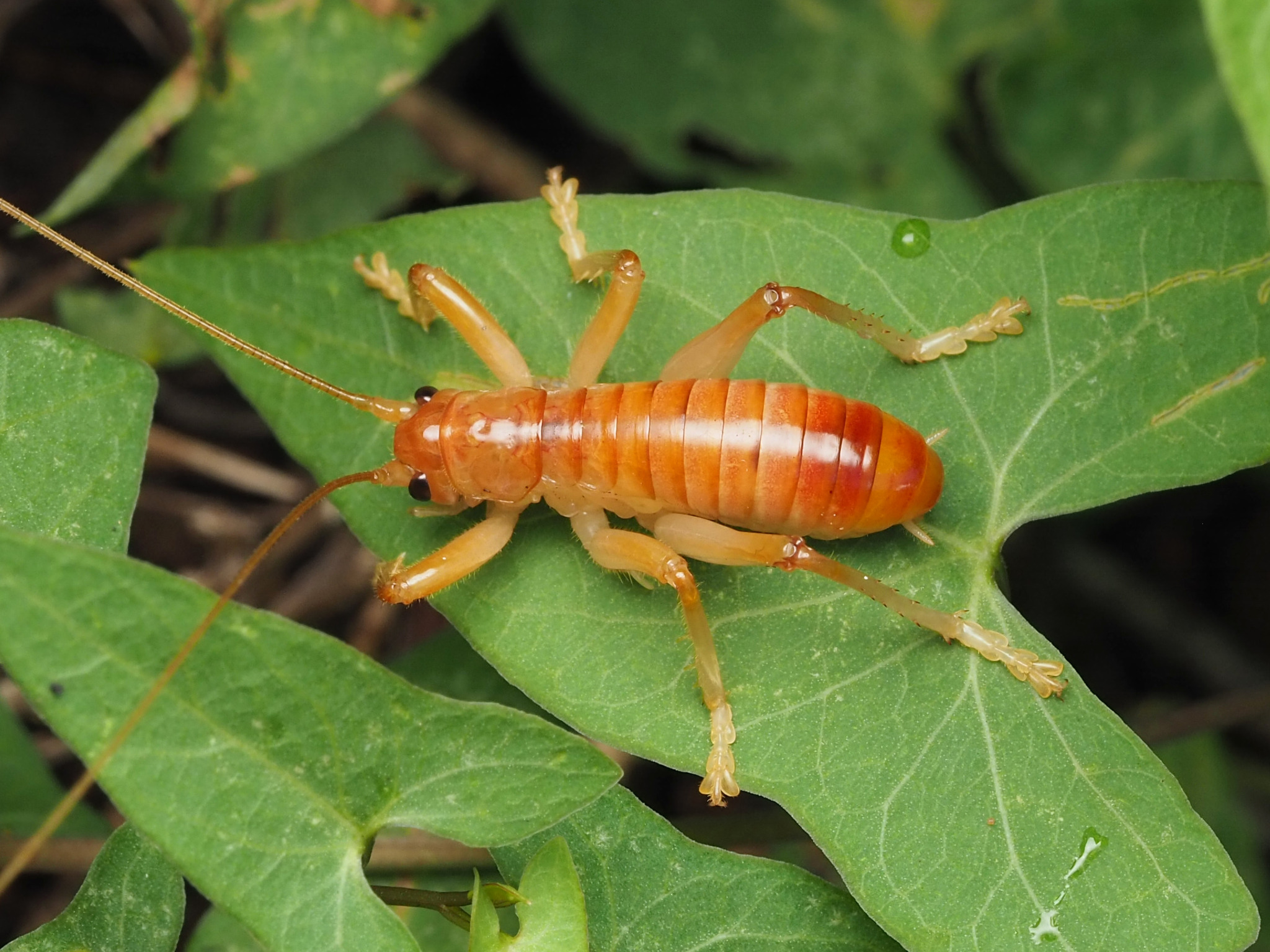
- Camptonotus carolinensis

Scientific classification
- Kingdom: Animalia
- Phylum: Arthropoda
- Class: Insecta
- Order: Orthoptera
- Suborder: Ensifera
- Family: Gryllacrididae
- Subfamily: Gryllacridinae
- Tribe: Gryllacridini
- Genus: Camptonotus; Uhler, 1864

Synonyms
- Neortus Brunner von Wattenwyl, 1888

= Camptonotus =

Genus of cricket-like animals

Camptonotus is a genus of leaf-rolling crickets in the subfamily Gryllacridinae; it was erected by Philip Reese Uhler in 1864.

== Species ==
The Orthoptera Species File includes the following species: are all found in the Americas:

1. Camptonotus affinis Rehn, 1903
2. Camptonotus americanus Bruner, 1915
3. Camptonotus australis Rehn, 1907
4. Camptonotus carolinensis (Gerstaecker, 1860) - type species (as C. scudderi Uhler, by subsequent designation)
5. Camptonotus jamaicensis Brunner von Wattenwyl, 1888
