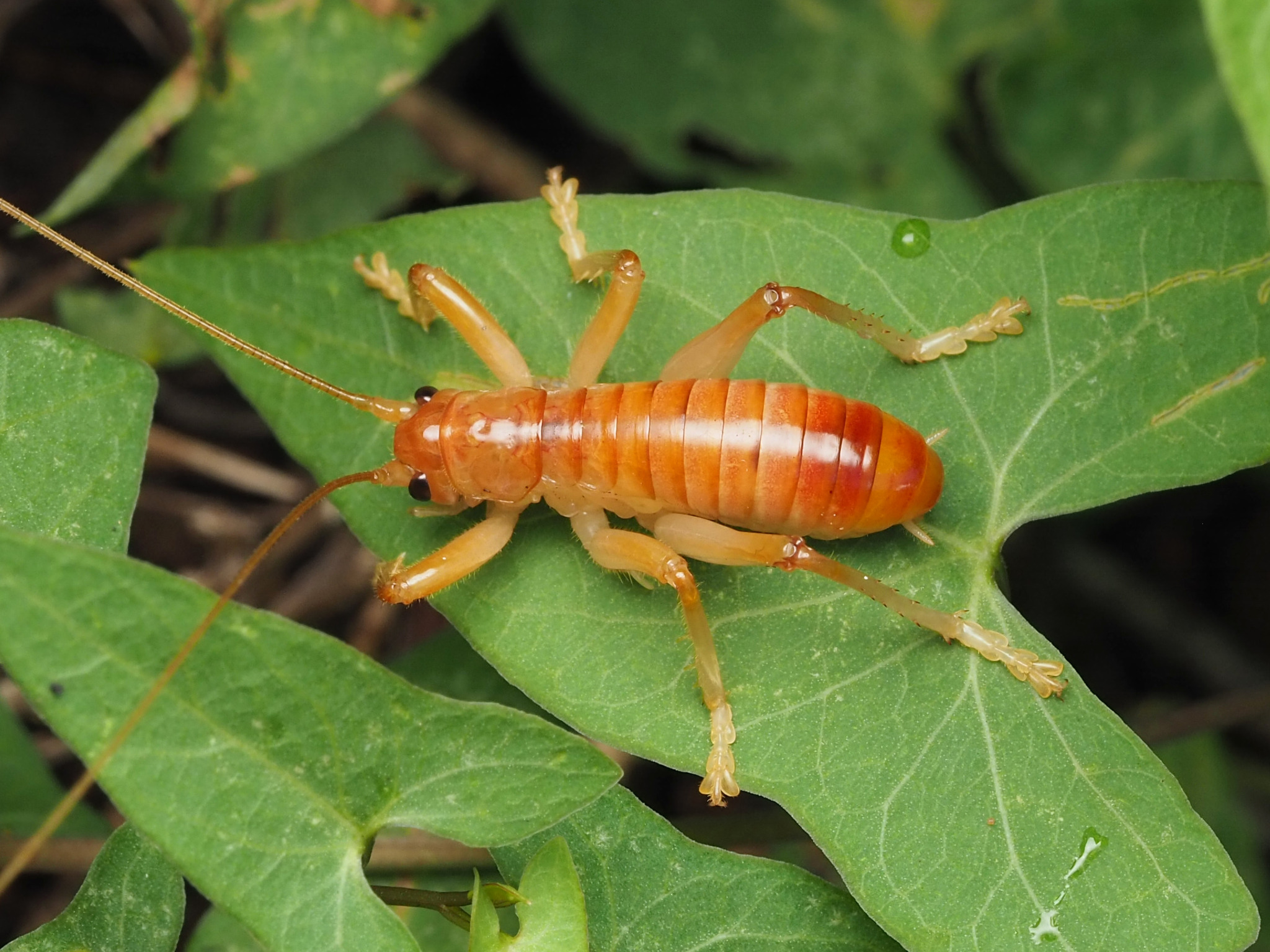

Scientific classification
- Domain: Eukaryota
- Kingdom: Animalia
- Phylum: Arthropoda
- Class: Insecta
- Order: Orthoptera
- Suborder: Ensifera
- Family: Gryllacrididae
- Genus: Camptonotus
- Species: C. carolinensis

Binomial name
- Camptonotus carolinensis (Gerstaecker, 1860)

= Camptonotus carolinensis =

Species of cricket-like animal

Camptonotus carolinensis, the Carolina leaf-roller, is a species of raspy cricket in the family Gryllacrididae. It is found in the eastern United States.

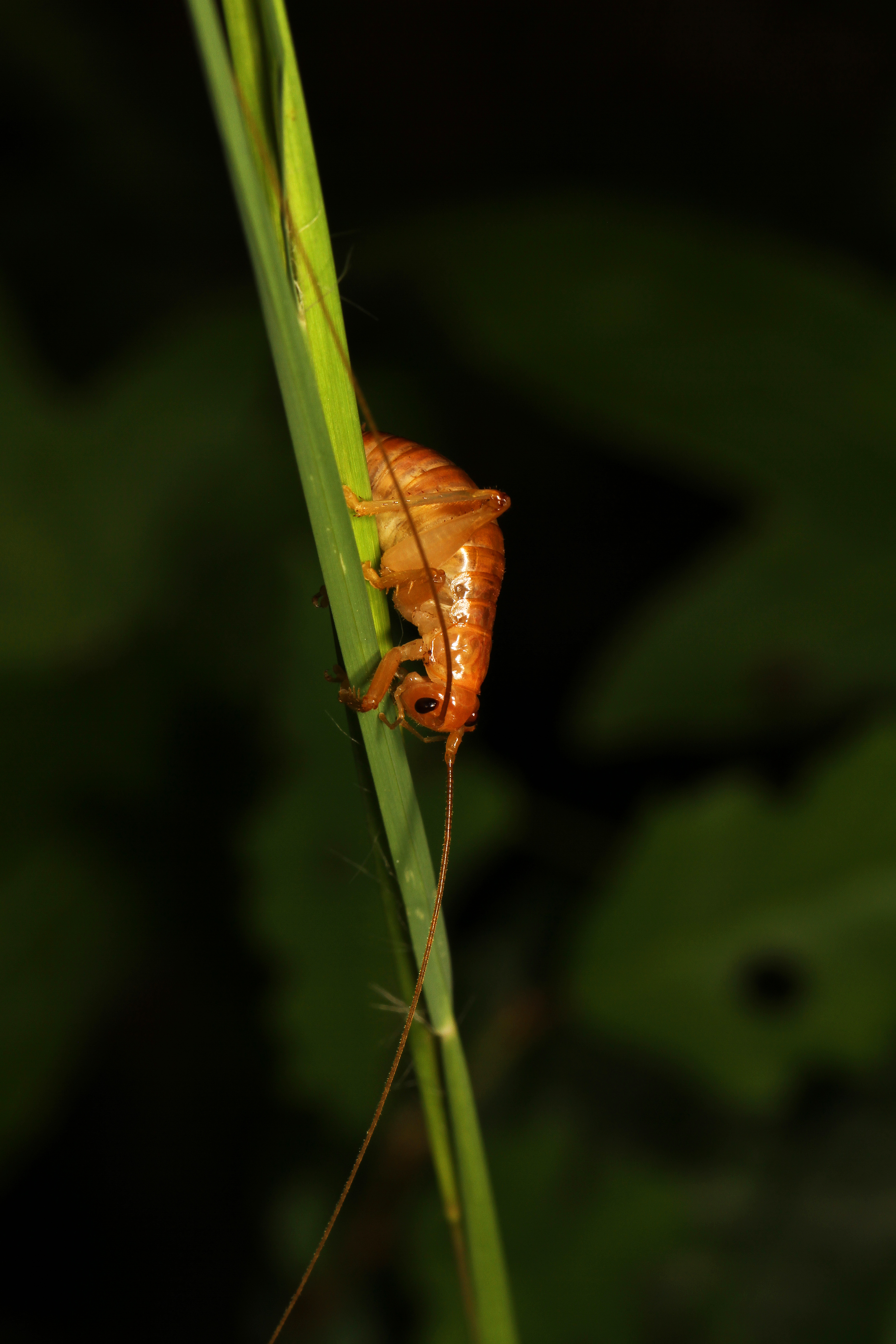
Carolina leaf-roller, Camptonotus carolinensis
