= Furcilarnaca =

Scientific classification
- Domain: Eukaryota
- Kingdom: Animalia
- Phylum: Arthropoda
- Class: Insecta
- Order: Orthoptera
- Suborder: Ensifera
- Family: Gryllacrididae
- Subfamily: Gryllacridinae
- Tribe: Gryllacridini
- Genus: Furcilarnaca; Gorochov, 2004

Genus of cricket-like animals

Furcilarnaca is an Asian genus of Orthopterans, sometimes known as 'leaf-folding crickets', in the subfamily Gryllacridinae and tribe Gryllacridini (genus group Metriogryllacrae). Species have been recorded from China and Indochina.

== Species ==
The Orthoptera Species File lists:

- Furcilarnaca affinis Li, Sun, Liu & Li, 2015
- Furcilarnaca armata (Bey-Bienko, 1962)
- Furcilarnaca belokobylskyi Gorochov, 2004
- Furcilarnaca beybienkoi Gorochov, 2004
- Furcilarnaca brachyptera Li, Sun, Liu & Li, 2015
- Furcilarnaca chiangdao Ingrisch, 2018
- Furcilarnaca chirurga (Bey-Bienko, 1962)
- Furcilarnaca fallax (Liu, Bi & Zhang, 2010)
- Furcilarnaca forceps (Bey-Bienko, 1962)
- Furcilarnaca fractiflexa Li, Sun, Liu & Li, 2015
- Furcilarnaca hirta Li, Sun, Liu & Li, 2015
- Furcilarnaca huangi Gorochov, 2004
- Furcilarnaca pulex (Karny, 1928)
- Furcilarnaca salit Ingrisch, 2018
- Furcilarnaca superfurca Gorochov, 2004 - type species - locality Sơn La Province, Vietnam
- Furcilarnaca trilobata Ingrisch, 2018
- Furcilarnaca wufengensis Bian, Shi & Guo, 2013
