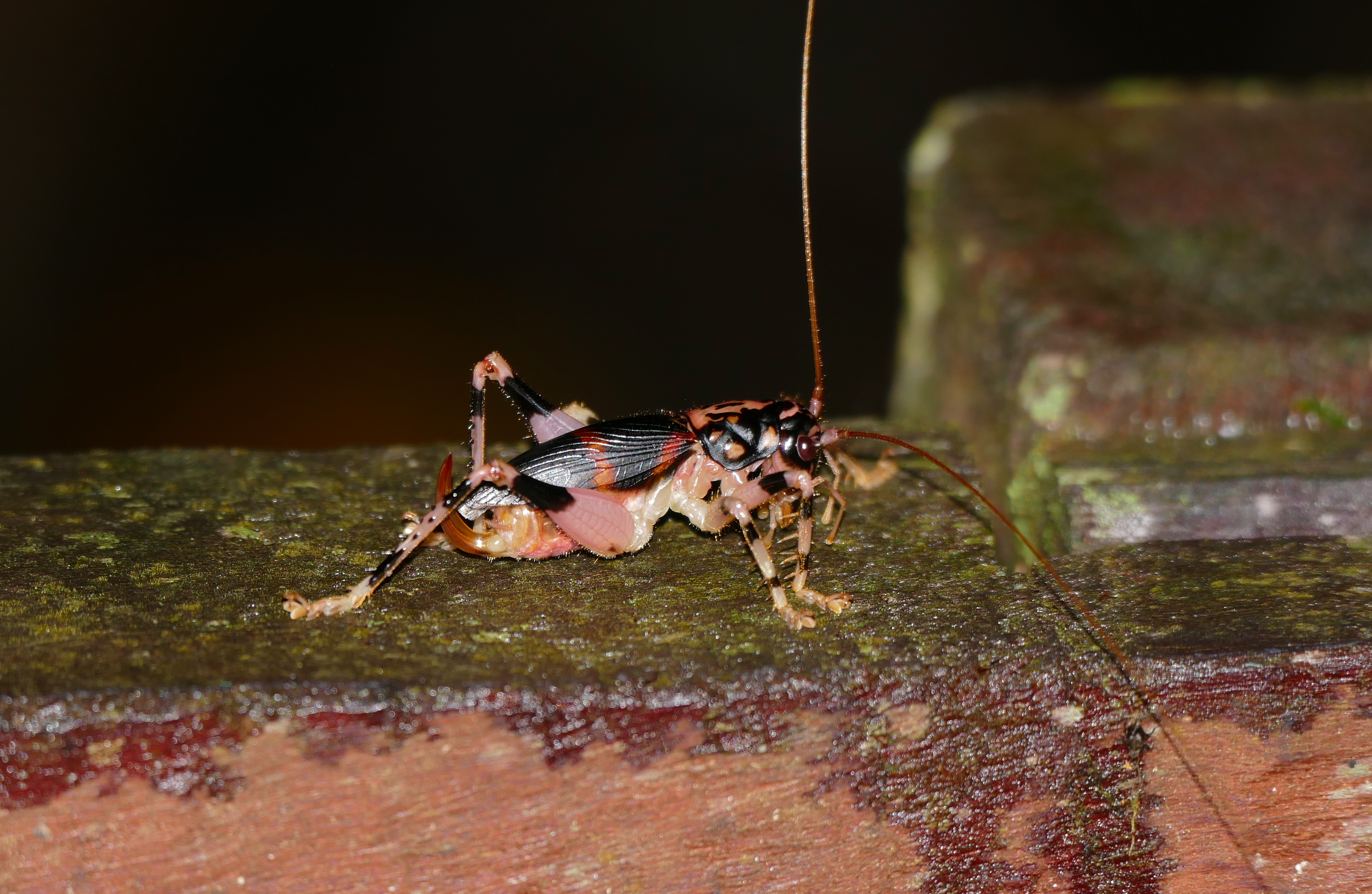
- Larnaca fasciata female

Scientific classification
- Kingdom: Animalia
- Phylum: Arthropoda
- Clade: Pancrustacea
- Class: Insecta
- Order: Orthoptera
- Suborder: Ensifera
- Family: Gryllacrididae
- Subfamily: Gryllacridinae
- Tribe: Gryllacridini
- Genus: Larnaca; Walker, 1869

Synonyms
- Scandalon Zacher, 1909

= Larnaca (cricket) =

Genus of cricket-like animals

Larnaca is a genus of Asian orthopterans, sometimes known as 'leaf-folding crickets', in the subfamily Gryllacridinae and tribe Gryllacridini. Species have been recorded from: southern China, Indochina and Sunda Islands.

== Species ==
The Orthoptera Species File lists:

subgenus Larnaca Walker, 1869

- Larnaca emarginata Bian, Guo & Shi, 2015
- Larnaca eugenii (Griffini, 1914)
- Larnaca fasciata Walker, 1869 - type species (locality Sarawak)
- Larnaca infolda Du, Bian & Shi, 2017
- Larnaca jacobsoni (Griffini, 1913)
- Larnaca larnacoides (Karny, 1937)
- Larnaca longispina Zhang, Zhang & Bian, 2023
- Larnaca lieyongzhou Shen & Yin, 2022
- Larnaca lincangensis (Yang, Jing & Bian, 2020)
- Larnaca manteri (Griffini, 1911)
- Larnaca microptera (Karny, 1926)
- Larnaca montana (Griffini, 1908)
- Larnaca nigrata (Brunner von Wattenwyl, 1888)
- Larnaca nigricornis Ingrisch, 2018
- Larnaca nigrifrons Pang, Zhang & Bian, 2023
- Larnaca nigrimacula Zhang, Zhang & Bian, 2023
- Larnaca nigrimargis Luo, Zhang & Bian, 2024
- Larnaca palliceps (Karny, 1926)
- Larnaca pendleburyi (Karny, 1926)
- Larnaca phetchaburi Gorochov, 2003
- Larnaca qianlei Yin & Shen, 2025
- Larnaca ridicula (Zacher, 1909)
- Larnaca rubiabdomina Su, Duan & Shi, 2024
- Larnaca rufifronta Su, Duan & Shi, 2024
- Larnaca samkos Ingrisch, 2018
- Larnaca subaptera Ingrisch, 2018
- Larnaca tenuis Ingrisch, 2018
- Larnaca vietnamensis Gorochov, 2003
- Larnaca walle Yin & Meng, 2021
- Larnaca xizangensis Su, Duan & Shi, 2024

subgenus Paralarnaca Gorochov, 2003

- Larnaca distincta (Brunner von Wattenwyl, 1888)
- Larnaca johni (Griffini, 1911)
