= Zalarnaca =

Scientific classification
- Domain: Eukaryota
- Kingdom: Animalia
- Phylum: Arthropoda
- Class: Insecta
- Order: Orthoptera
- Suborder: Ensifera
- Family: Gryllacrididae
- Subfamily: Hyperbaeninae
- Tribe: Asarcogryllacridini
- Genus: Zalarnaca; Gorochov, 2005

Genus of cricket-like animals

Zalarnaca is a genus of Asian Orthopterans sometimes known as "leaf-folding-" or "raspy-crickets", in the subfamily Hyperbaeninae and tribe Asarcogryllacridini, erected by Andrey Gorochov in 2005. Species have been recorded from Indochina and western Malesia (including Borneo).

== Species ==
The Orthoptera Species File lists:

1. Zalarnaca abbreviata Gorochov, 2008
2. Zalarnaca aculeata Gorochov, 2005
  – type species, locality Gia Lai, Vietnam
3. Zalarnaca kerinci Gorochov, 2008
4. Zalarnaca lobata Gorochov, 2005
5. Zalarnaca maninjau Ingrisch, 2018
6. Zalarnaca separata (Karny, 1926)
7. Zalarnaca simalurensis (Karny, 1931) (2 subspecies)
8. Zalarnaca sotshivkoi Gorochov, 2008
9. Zalarnaca teuthroides (Karny, 1925)
10. Zalarnaca udovitshenkoi Gorochov, 2008
