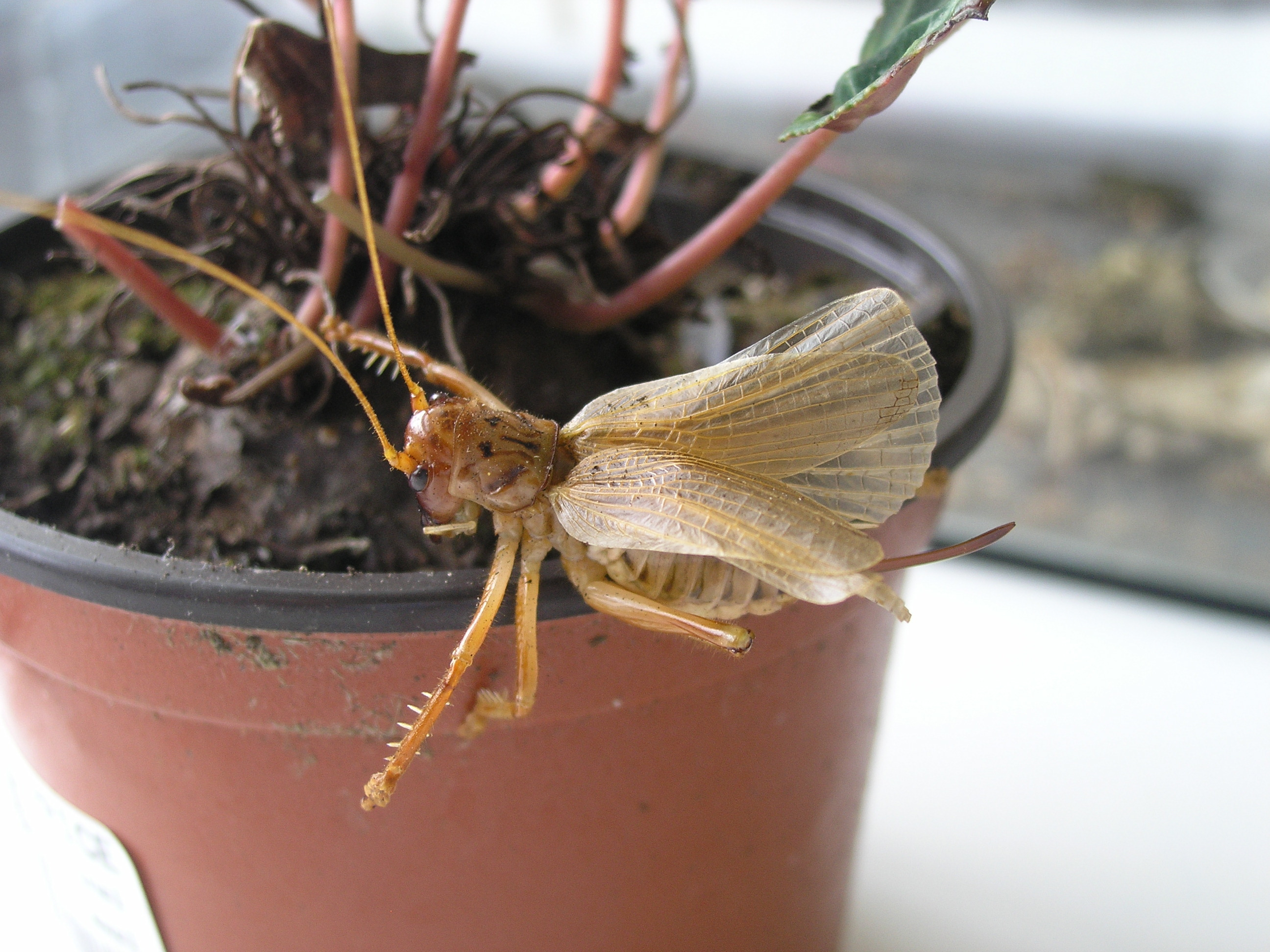
- Pterapotrechus sp. (Auckland)

Scientific classification
- Domain: Eukaryota
- Kingdom: Animalia
- Phylum: Arthropoda
- Class: Insecta
- Order: Orthoptera
- Suborder: Ensifera
- Family: Gryllacrididae
- Subfamily: Hyperbaeninae; Cadena-Castañeda, 2019

= Hyperbaeninae =

Subfamily of cricket-like animals

Hyperbaeninae is a subfamily of Orthopterans, sometimes known as 'leaf-folding crickets' in the family Gryllacrididae; Hyperbaenus ensifer is the type species. The known distribution includes tropical: central and southern America, Africa and mainland Asia to Australasia.

== Tribes & Genera ==
Following Cadena-Castañeda's (2019) review, the Orthoptera Species File lists five tribes:

=== Asarcogryllacridini ===
Auth.: Cadena-Castañeda, 2019 - distribution: SE Asia

1. Asarcogryllacris Karny, 1937
2. Dialarnaca Gorochov, 2005
3. Zalarnaca Gorochov, 2005

=== Capnogryllacridini ===
Auth.: Cadena-Castañeda, 2019 - distribution: India, SE Asia

1. Borneogryllacris Karny, 1937
2. Capnogryllacris Karny, 1937
3. Diaphanogryllacris Karny, 1937
4. Dictyogryllacris Karny, 1937
5. Marthogryllacris Karny, 1937
6. Ultragryllacris Gorochov & Dawwrueng, 2015
7. Woznessenskia Gorochov, 2002

=== Hyperbaenini ===
Auth.: Cadena-Castañeda, 2019 - S. America

1. Dibelona Brunner von Wattenwyl, 1888
2. Hyperbaenus Brunner von Wattenwyl, 1888 – type genus
3. Mikrohyperbaenus Cadena-Castañeda, 2021

=== Paragryllacridini ===
Auth.: Cadena-Castañeda, 2019 - Australia, W Africa

- Acanthogryllacris Karny, 1937
- Bothriogryllacris Rentz, 1983
- Chauliogryllacris Rentz, 1990
- Craspedogryllacris Karny, 1937
- Hadrogryllacris Karny, 1937
- Mooracra Rentz, 1990
- Paragryllacris Brunner von Wattenwyl, 1888
- Pterapotrechus Karny, 1937
- Urogryllacris Rentz, 1997

=== Phryganogryllacridini ===
Auth.: Cadena-Castañeda, 2019 - pantropical

1. Aancistroger Bey-Bienko, 1957
2. Abelona Karny, 1937 - South America
3. Afroepacra Griffini, 1912
4. Afrogryllacris Karny, 1937
5. Claudiagryllacris Cadena-Castañeda, 2019 - Madagascar
6. Echidnogryllacris Griffini, 1912 - Madagascar
7. Epacra Brunner von Wattenwyl, 1888 - Australia
8. Glenogryllacris Karny, 1930 - New Guinea
9. Heterogryllacris Karny, 1937
10. Hyalogryllacris Karny, 1937
11. Nullanullia Rentz, 1990
12. Nunkeria Rentz, 1990
13. Papuogryllacris Griffini, 1909
14. Phryganogryllacris Karny, 1937 - India, SE Asia
15. Pissodogryllacris Karny, 1937 - Madagascar
16. Plexigryllacris Ingrisch, 2018 - New Guinea
17. Psilogryllacris Karny, 1937
18. Siamgryllacris Ingrisch, 2018
