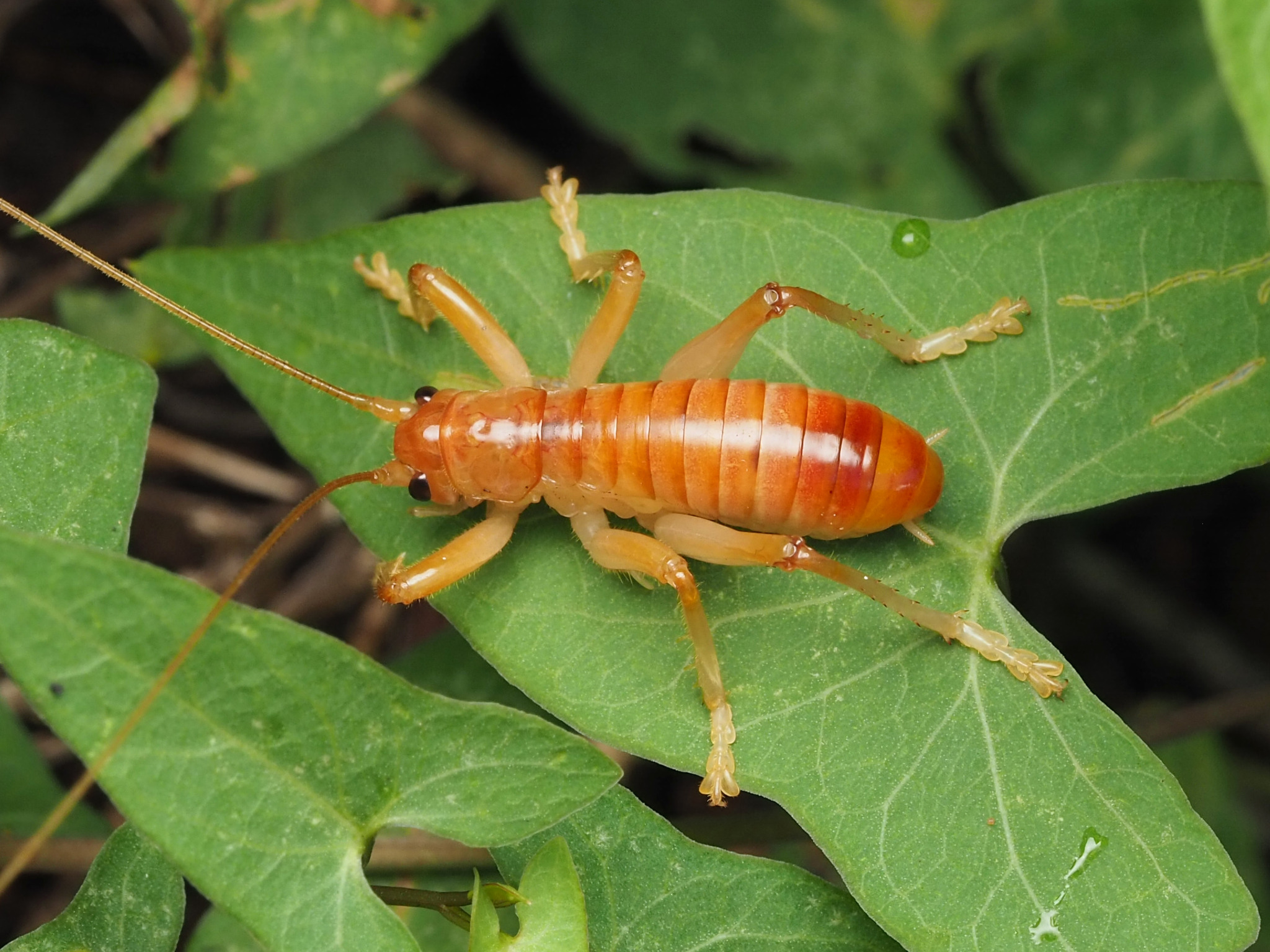
- Camptonotus carolinensis

Scientific classification
- Kingdom: Animalia
- Phylum: Arthropoda
- Class: Insecta
- Order: Orthoptera
- Suborder: Ensifera
- Family: Gryllacrididae
- Subfamily: Gryllacridinae; Blanchard, 1845

Tribes & Genera
- see text

Synonyms
- Gryllacrinae Blanchard, 1845

= Gryllacridinae =

Subfamily of cricket-like animals

Gryllacridinae is an Orthopteran subfamily in the family Gryllacrididae.

== Tribes and Genera ==
The Orthoptera Species File lists:

=== Ametrini ===
Auth.: Cadena-Castañeda, 2019;

genus group Ametrae Cadena-Castañeda, 2019

distribution: Australia

1. Ametrus Brunner von Wattenwyl, 1888
2. Pareremus Ander, 1934

genus group Apotrechae Cadena-Castañeda, 2019

distribution: southern China, Vietnam, Australia (may be incomplete)

1. Apotrechus Brunner von Wattenwyl, 1888
2. Apterolarnaca Gorochov, 2004

genus group Apteronomae Cadena-Castañeda, 2019

distribution: Australia only

1. Ametrosomus Tepper, 1892
2. Apteronomus Tepper, 1892

=== Ametroidini ===
Auth.: Cadena-Castañeda, 2019; distribution: Africa including Madagascar

1. Ametroides Karny, 1928
2. Atychogryllacris Karny, 1937
3. Glomeremus Karny, 1937
4. Ingrischgryllacris Cadena-Castañeda, 2019
5. Pseuderemus Karny, 1932

=== Eremini ===
Auth.: Cadena-Castañeda, 2019; distribution: Asia, Australia

1. Cooraboorama Rentz, 1990
2. Eremus Brunner von Wattenwyl, 1888
3. Giganteremus Karny, 1937
4. Haplogryllacris Karny, 1937
5. Hugelgryllacris Cadena-Castañeda, 2019
6. Kinemania Rentz, 1990
7. Wirritina Rentz, 1990

=== Gryllacridini ===
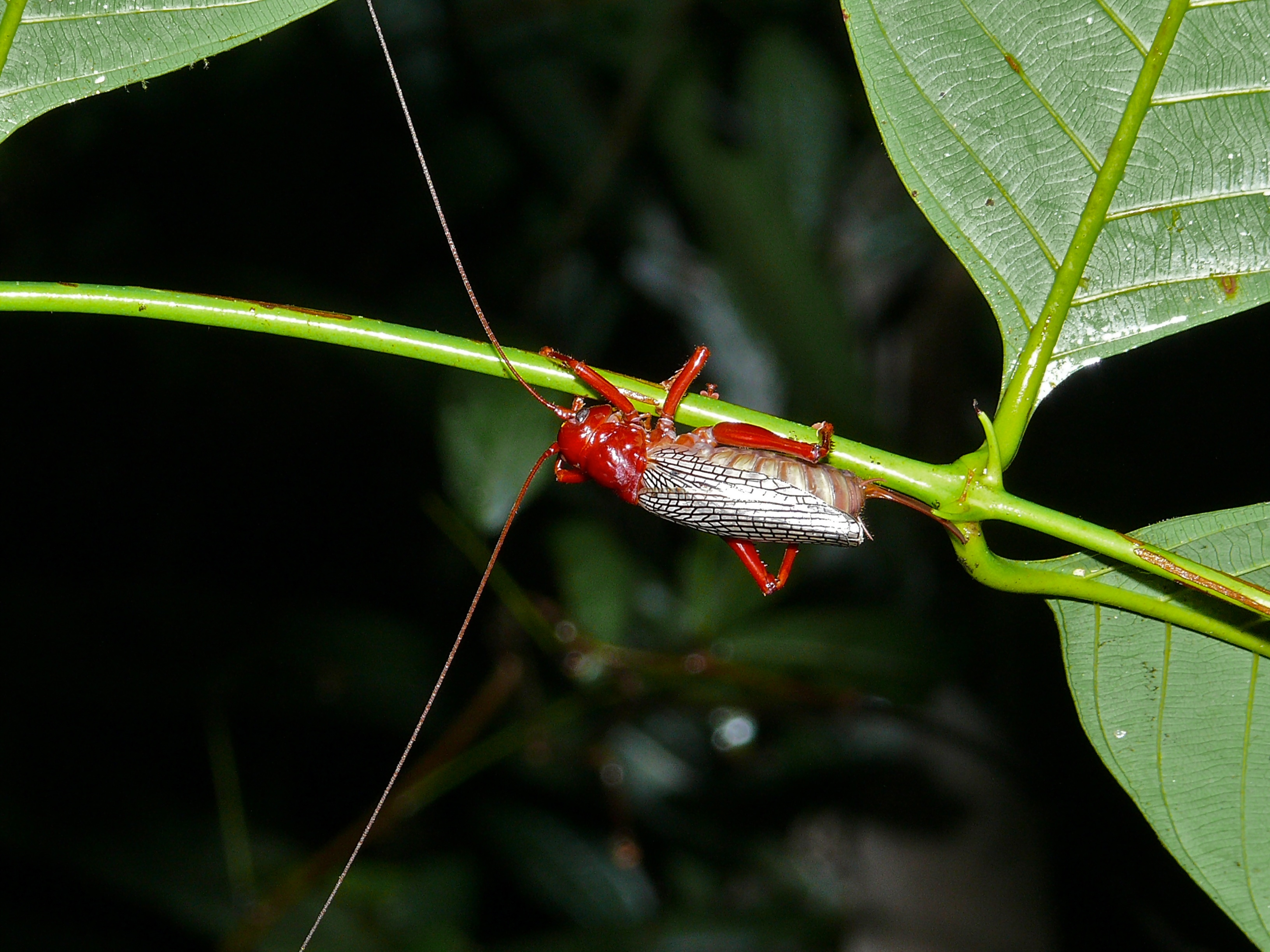
Phlebogryllacris venosa

Auth.: Blanchard, 1845; distribution: worldwide, especially tropics

genus group Anancistrogerae Cadena-Castañeda, 2019

1. Anancistrogera Karny, 1937
2. Ancistrogera Brunner von Wattenwyl, 1898
3. Angustogryllacris Ingrisch, 2018
4. Aphanogryllacris Karny, 1937
5. Celebogryllacris Karny, 1937

genus group Gryllacrae Blanchard, 1845

1. Caustogryllacris Karny, 1937
2. Eugryllacris Karny, 1937
3. Gryllacris Serville, 1831
4. Lyperogryllacris Karny, 1937
5. Nesogryllacris Karny, 1937 - monotypic N. wetterana from Wetter Island
6. Ocellarnaca Gorochov, 2004
7. Phlebogryllacris Karny, 1937
8. Prosopogryllacris Karny, 1937
9. Willemsegryllacris Cadena-Castañeda, 2019 - monotypic W. barnesi from India
10. Xanthogryllacris Karny, 1937

genus group Metriogryllacrae Cadena-Castañeda, 2019

1. Furcilarnaca Gorochov, 2004
2. Homogryllacris Liu, 2007
3. Metriogryllacris Karny, 1937
4. Pseudasarca Ingrisch, 2018

genus group not assigned

1. Afroneanias Karny, 1937
2. Amphibologryllacris Karny, 1937
3. Arrolla Rentz, 1990
4. Australogryllacris Karny, 1937
5. Barombogryllacris Karny, 1937
6. Brachybaenus Karny, 1937
7. Brachyntheisogryllacris Karny, 1937
8. Camptonotus Uhler, 1864
9. Caudafistulus Cadena-Castañeda, 2021
10. Celeboneanias Karny, 1937
11. Dinolarnaca Gorochov, 2008
12. Glolarnaca Gorochov, 2008
13. Gorochovgryllacris Cadena-Castañeda, 2019
14. Griffinigryllacris Cadena-Castañeda, 2019
15. Idiolarnaca - monotypic I. hamata Gorochov, 2005 - Philippines
16. Larnaca Walker, 1869
17. Melaneremus Karny, 1937
18. Melanogryllacris Karny, 1937
19. Microlarnaca Gorochov, 2004
20. Minigryllacris Ingrisch, 2018
21. Monseremus Ingrisch, 2018
22. Nannogryllacris Karny, 1937
23. Neanias Brunner von Wattenwyl, 1888
24. Neoeremus Karny, 1937
25. Neolarnaca Gorochov, 2004
26. Nippancistroger Griffini, 1913
27. Otidiogryllacris Karny, 1937
28. Papuoneanias Karny, 1929
29. Paraneanias Ingrisch, 2018
30. Rentzgryllacris Cadena-Castañeda, 2019
31. Siderogryllacris Karny, 1937
32. Solomogryllacris Willemse, 1953
33. Stictogryllacris Karny, 1937
34. Tytthogryllacris Karny, 1937

=== Progryllacridini ===
Auth.: Cadena-Castañeda, 2019; distribution: South America, Africa

1. Brunnergryllacris Cadena-Castañeda, 2019
2. Karnygryllacris Cadena-Castañeda, 2019
3. Magnumtergalis Cadena-Castañeda, 2020
4. Progryllacris Ander, 1939

Incertae sedis

1. Bicornisgryllacris Li, Yin & He, 2024
2. Dracogryllacris Li, Yin & He, 2024
3. Magnigryllacris Li, Yin & He, 2024
4. Niphetogryllacris Karny, 1937
5. †Plesiolarnaca – monotypic - P. prior Gorochov, 2010
6. Radigryllacris Li, Yin & He, 2024
7. Sericgryllacris Li, Yin & He, 2024
8. Tenuigryllacris Li, Yin & He, 2024
