= Heinrich Hugo Karny =

Austrian physician and entomologist

Heinrich Hugo Karny (7 October 1886 – 7 August 1939) was an Austrian physician and entomologist who specialised in Thysanoptera and Orthoptera.

He was a friend of Lucien Chopard and they were regular correspondents during Karny’s medical work in the Dutch East Indies. Karny was born in Mödling and died in Kroisbach.

== Collections ==
Karny’s collection is shared. Parts are in the Swedish Museum of Natural History (South Europe Orthoptera), other parts are in Buitenzorg Zoological Museum (Sumatra insects); National University of Singapore Raffles Museum of Biodiversity Research (insects from Mentawai Islands –shared with Buitenzorg); Steiermärkisches Landesmuseum Joanneum Graz (Gryllacridae); Senckenberg Museum in Frankfurt (Thysanoptera) and the Naturhistorisches Museum in Vienna (Orthoptera especially from Malaya).

== Works ==
- 1907. REVISIO CONOCEPHALIDARUM. Abhandlungen der k.k. Zool.-bot. Ges. Wien 4(3):96
- Revision der Gattung Heliothrips Haliday. Entomologische Rundschau 28: 179–182 (1911)
- Beitrag zur Thysanopteren-Fauna von Neu Guinea und Neu-Britannien. Archiv für Naturgeschichte. Berlin 79: 123–136 (1913)
- Zur Systematik der Orthopteroiden Insekten, Thysanoptera. Treubia 1: 211–269 (1921)
- Beiträge zur Malayischen Thysanopterenfauna. VI. Malayische Rindenthripse, gesammelt von Dr. N.A. Kemner. Treubia 3: 277–380 (1923)
- Beiträge zur Malayischen Thysanopterenfauna. Parts VI–IX. Treubia 3 (3–4) (1923–1926).
- Results of Dr. E. Mjöbergs Swedish scientific expeditions to Australia 1910–1913. Gryllacridae. 1929.
- A revision of the South African Gryllacridae (Orthoptera Saltatoria) Ann. S. Afr. Mus. (1929).
- Orthoptera. Fam. Gryllacrididae. Wysman’s Genera Insectorum 206: 317pp (1937)
- Works listed by DNB
