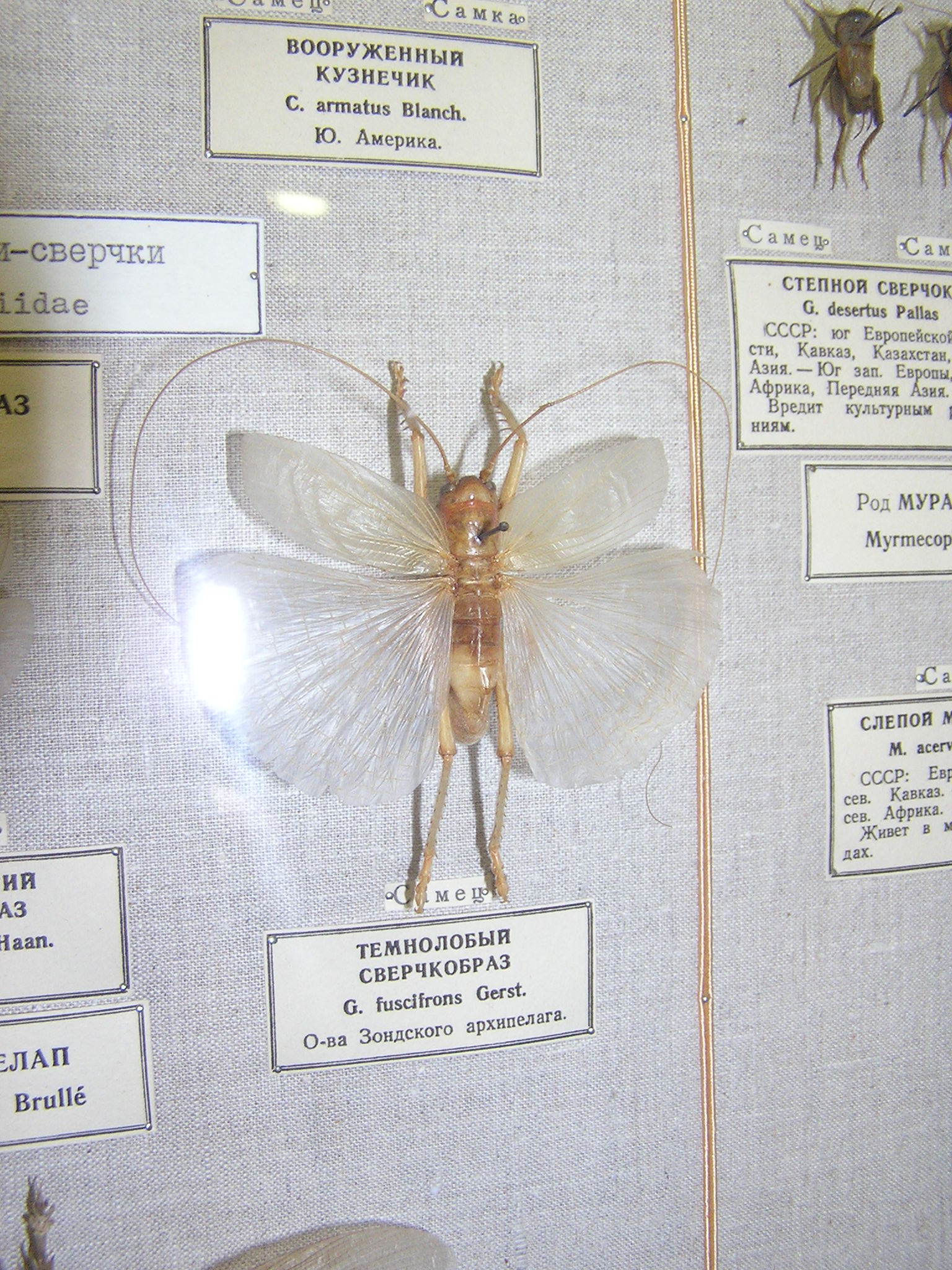
- Gryllacris fuscifrons

Scientific classification
- Domain: Eukaryota
- Kingdom: Animalia
- Phylum: Arthropoda
- Class: Insecta
- Order: Orthoptera
- Suborder: Ensifera
- Family: Gryllacrididae
- Tribe: Gryllacridini
- Genus: Gryllacris; Serville, 1831

= Gryllacris =

Genus of cricket-like animals

External image
- Images at iNaturalist

Gryllacris is a genus of Orthopterans, sometimes known as 'leaf-folding crickets' in the subfamily Gryllacridinae. It is the type genus for the family, tribe Gryllacridini and its subfamily.

The genus primarily has an Asian distribution - from India to the Pacific Islands - with a few records for individual species found in eastern Europe and the Americas.

== Species ==
The Orthoptera Species File lists:

=== subgenus Gigantogryllacris ===
Auth. Karny, 1937; distribution Malesia

1. Gryllacris adjutrix Brunner von Wattenwyl, 1898
2. Gryllacris athleta Brunner von Wattenwyl, 1888
3. Gryllacris bilineata Ingrisch, 2018
4. Gryllacris compromittens Brunner von Wattenwyl, 1898
5. Gryllacris excelsa Brunner von Wattenwyl, 1888
6. Gryllacris heros Gerstaecker, 1860
7. Gryllacris ligulata Ingrisch, 2018
8. Gryllacris marginipennis (Karny, 1937)
9. Gryllacris morotaiensis (Karny, 1937)
10. Gryllacris piceifrons Walker, 1869
11. Gryllacris producta Karny, 1929
12. Gryllacris rhodocnemis Karny, 1929
13. Gryllacris ternatensis Karny, 1928

=== subgenus Gryllacris ===
Auth. Serville, 1831

species group fuscifrons

Auth. Gerstaecker, 1860 - Malesia

1. Gryllacris aethiops Brunner von Wattenwyl, 1888
2. Gryllacris barabensis Karny, 1931
3. Gryllacris barussa Karny, 1931
4. Gryllacris concolorifrons Karny, 1937
5. Gryllacris fuscifrons Gerstaecker, 1860
6. Gryllacris incornuta Ingrisch, 2018
7. Gryllacris jacobsonii Karny, 1924
8. Gryllacris ouwensi Karny, 1924
9. Gryllacris pulchra Griffini, 1909
10. Gryllacris rufovaria Kirby, 1888
11. Gryllacris servillei Haan, 1843
12. Gryllacris sirambeica Griffini, 1908

species group nigrilabris

Auth. Gerstaecker, 1860 - West Malesia

1. Gryllacris kinabaluensis Griffini, 1914
2. Gryllacris maculata Giebel, 1861
3. Gryllacris nigrilabris Gerstaecker, 1860

species group signifera

Auth. (Stoll, 1813) - India, Myanmar, Cambodia, Malsia, New Guinea, Pacific Islands

1. Gryllacris andamana Karny, 1928
2. Gryllacris appendiculata Brunner von Wattenwyl, 1888
3. Gryllacris bancana Karny, 1930
4. Gryllacris buruensis Karny, 1924
5. Gryllacris contracta Walker, 1869
6. Gryllacris cyclopimontana Karny, 1924
7. Gryllacris javanica Griffini, 1908
8. Gryllacris modestipennis Karny, 1935
9. Gryllacris obscura Brunner von Wattenwyl, 1888
10. Gryllacris pustulata Stål, 1877
11. Gryllacris signifera (Stoll, 1813)
  - type species (as G. maculicollis Serville = G. signifera signifera from Malesia)
12. Gryllacris uvarovii Karny, 1926

species group voluptaria

Auth. Brunner von Wattenwyl, 1888 - Sulawesi

1. Gryllacris libidinosa Karny, 1931
2. Gryllacris voluptaria Brunner von Wattenwyl, 1888

species group not determined

1. Gryllacris atromaculata Willemse, 1928
2. Gryllacris atropicta Griffini, 1911
3. †Gryllacris bodei Karny, 1928
4. Gryllacris brahmina Pictet & Saussure, 1893
5. Gryllacris buhleri Willemse, 1953
6. Gryllacris discoidalis Walker, 1869
7. Gryllacris ebneri Karny, 1924
8. Gryllacris equalis (Walker, 1859)
9. Gryllacris eta Karny, 1925
10. Gryllacris fastigiata (Linnaeus, 1758)
11. †Gryllacris kittli Handlirsch, 1907
12. Gryllacris macrura Karny, 1931
13. Gryllacris malayana Fritze, 1908
14. Gryllacris marginata Walker, 1869
15. Gryllacris matura Karny, 1931
16. Gryllacris menglaensis Bian, Zhu & Shi, 2017
17. †Gryllacris mutilata Cockerell, 1909
18. Gryllacris pallidula Serville, 1838
19. Gryllacris peracca Karny, 1923
20. Gryllacris piracicabae Piza, 1975
21. Gryllacris pumila Karny, 1925
22. Gryllacris sok Ingrisch, 2018
23. Gryllacris solutifascia Karny, 1937
24. Gryllacris stylommatoprocera Wang & Liu, 2022
25. Gryllacris sumbaensis Willemse, 1953
26. Gryllacris vicosae Piza, 1975
27. Gryllacris vietnami Gorochov, 2007
28. Gryllacris vittata Walker, 1869

=== subgenus Pardogryllacris ===
Auth. Karny, 1937; distribution: Sri Lanka, Indochina, west Malesia

1. Gryllacris abnormis (Karny, 1937) - Java
2. Gryllacris dyak Griffini, 1909 - Borneo
3. Gryllacris lineolata Serville, 1838 - Java
4. Gryllacris longiloba Gorochov & Dawwrueng, 2015
5. Gryllacris ovulicauda Ingrisch, 2018 - Vietnam
6. Gryllacris pardalina Gerstaecker, 1860 - Sri Lanka
7. Gryllacris spuria Brunner von Wattenwyl, 1888 - Sri Lanka
