= Gryllacrididae =

- Hyalogryllacris sp. fabricating silk

Scientific classification
- Kingdom: Animalia
- Phylum: Arthropoda
- Class: Insecta
- Order: Orthoptera
- Suborder: Ensifera
- Superfamily: Stenopelmatoidea
- Family: Gryllacrididae; Blanchard, 1845

Subfamilies
- Gryllacridinae; Hyperbaeninae

Synonyms
- Gryllacridae

Family of insects

Gryllacrididae are a family of non-jumping insects in the suborder Ensifera occurring worldwide, known commonly as leaf-rolling crickets or raspy crickets. The family historically has been broadly defined to include what are presently several other families, such as Stenopelmatidae ("Jerusalem crickets") and Rhaphidophoridae ("camel crickets"), now considered separate. As presently defined, the family contains two subfamilies: Gryllacridinae and Hyperbaeninae. They are commonly wingless and nocturnal. In the daytime, most species rest in shelters made from folded leaves sewn with silk. Some species use silk to burrow in sand, earth or wood. Raspy crickets evolved the ability to produce silk independently from other insects, but their silk has many convergent features to silkworm silk, being made of long, repetitive proteins with an extended beta-sheet structure.

== Subfamilies, tribes and selected genera ==
The Orthoptera Species File lists two subfamilies:

=== Gryllacridinae ===
tribe Ametrini Cadena-Castañeda, 2019

- Ametrus Brunner von Wattenwyl, 1888
- Apterolarnaca Gorochov, 2004

tribe Ametroidini Cadena-Castañeda, 2019

- Ametroides Karny, 1928
- Glomeremus Karny, 1937

tribe Eremini Cadena-Castañeda, 2019

- Eremus Brunner von Wattenwyl, 1888

tribe Gryllacridini Blanchard, 1845

- Camptonotus Uhler, 1864
- Furcilarnaca Gorochov, 2004
- Gryllacris Serville, 1831 – type genus
- Larnaca (cricket) Walker, 1869

=== Hyperbaeninae ===
tribe Asarcogryllacridini Cadena-Castañeda, 2019

- Asarcogryllacris Karny, 1937
- Zalarnaca Gorochov, 2005

tribe Capnogryllacridini Cadena-Castañeda, 2019

- Capnogryllacris Karny, 1937
- Marthogryllacris Karny, 1937
- Woznessenskia Gorochov, 2002

tribe Hyperbaenini Cadena-Castañeda, 2019

- Hyperbaenus Brunner von Wattenwyl, 1888 – type genus for subfamily

tribe Paragryllacridini Cadena-Castañeda, 2019

- Paragryllacris Brunner von Wattenwyl, 1888

tribe Phryganogryllacridini Cadena-Castañeda, 2019

- Phryganogryllacris Karny, 1937

=== Fossil taxa (unplaced) ===
- Plesiolarnaca †
- Pseudogryllacris †
- Xenogryllacris † - X. reductus Riek, 1955

Note: The genus Lezina of the subfamily Lezininae is now placed in the family Anostostomatidae.
