= Specialization in bees =

Specialization in bees may refer to:

- Melittology, the scientific study of bees
- Beekeeping, the maintenance and use of bee colonies by humans
- Different castes of bees, such as workers, laying workers, queens, and drones
- Different behaviors of bees, such as polyethism (specialization in certain tasks) or task allocation and partitioning (how division of specialized labor is organized in the colony)
