= Spatial organization =

Spatial organization can be observed when components of an abiotic or biological group are arranged non-randomly in space. Abiotic patterns, such as the ripple formations in sand dunes or the oscillating wave patterns of the Belousov–Zhabotinsky reaction emerge after thousands of particles interact millions of times. On the other hand, individuals in biological groups may be arranged non-randomly due to selfish behavior, dominance interactions, or cooperative behavior. W. D. Hamilton (1971) proposed that in a non-related "herd" of animals, the spatial organization is likely a result of the selfish interests of individuals trying to acquire food or avoid predation. On the other hand, spatial arrangements have also been observed among highly related members of eusocial groups, suggesting that the arrangement of individuals may provide advantages for the group.

Spatial organization can be defined as how something is organized internally as well as externally concerning its surroundings. It can be viewed both on a large or small scale and may also include in its discussion, the factors and conditions that lead to a specific organization pattern. In the frame of biology this may include the abiotic and biotic factors that a population is immersed in. In the frame of civilization, spatial organization may include if an area is rural, suburban, or urban. Spatial organization can even include how one manages and organizes their lawn to meet social norms.

== In eusocial insects ==
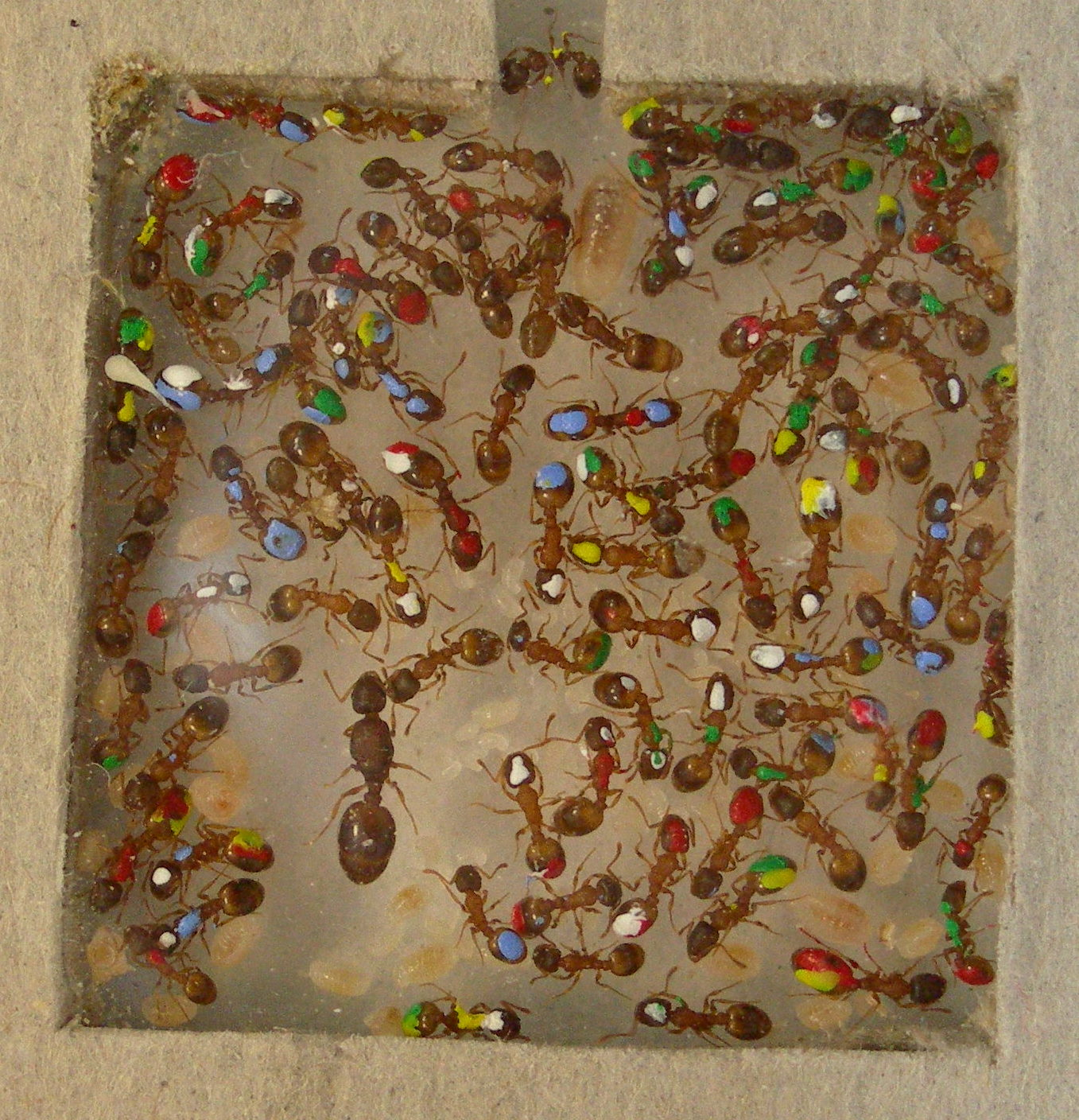
Spatial patterns exhibited by ants (Temnothorax rugatulus) can be determined after each individual is painted with a distinguishing mark.

Individuals in a social insect colony can be spatially organized, or arranged non-randomly inside the nest. These miniature territories, or spatial fidelity zones have been described in honey bees (Apis mellifera), ants (Odontomachus brunneus; Temnothorax albipennis; Pheidole dentata), and paper wasps (Polistes dominulus, Ropalidia revolutionalis). While residing in these zones, workers perform the task appropriate to the area they reside. For example, individuals that remain in the center of an ant nest are more likely to feed larvae, whereas individuals found at the periphery of the nest are more likely to forage. E. O. Wilson proposed that by remaining in small, non-random areas inside the nest, the distance an individual moves between tasks may be minimized, and overall colony efficiency would increase.

=== In the nest ===
==== Foraging-for-work ====
There are a variety of ways in which individuals can divide space inside a nest. According to the "foraging-for-work" hypothesis, adult workers begin performing tasks in the area of the nest where they emerged, and gradually move towards the periphery of the nest as demands to perform particular tasks change. This hypothesis is based on two observations: "(1) that there is spatial structure in the layout of tasks in social insect colonies and (2) that workers first become adults in or around the center of the nest". Individuals can remain in an area for an extended period, as long as tasks need to be performed there. Over time, an individual's zone may shift as tasks are accomplished and workers search for other areas where tasks need to be performed. Honey bees, for example, begin their adult life caring for brood located in the area near where they emerged (i.e. nurse bees). Eventually, workers move away from the brood rearing area and begin to perform other tasks, such as food storage, guarding, or foraging.

==== Dominance hierarchy ====
The dominant paper wasp (Polistes flavus) remains in the center of the nest while subordinate wasps are often at the edge or off the nest.

Space inside the nest may also be divided as a result of dominance interactions. For example, in paper wasp colonies, a single inseminated queen may find (initiate) a colony after waking up from hibernation (overwintering). However, it is common in many species that multiple inseminated females join these foundresses instead of founding their own nest. When multiple inseminated females found a colony together, the colony grows quickly, yet only one individual will become the primary egg-layer. Through a series of dominance interactions, the most aggressive wasp will emerge as the dominant individual and will become the primary egg-layer for the group (the prime role for ensuring your genes are passed on to subsequent generations), whereas the remaining subordinate wasps will perform other tasks, such as nest construction or foraging. There is evidence that these dominance interactions affect the spatial zones individuals occupy as well. In paper wasps (Ropalidia revolutionalis), as well as in the ant species Odontomachus brunneus, dominant individuals are more likely to reside in the central areas of the nest, where they take care of the brood, while the subordinate individuals are pushed towards the edge, where they are more likely to forage. It is unknown whether division of space or establishment of dominance occurs first and if the other is a result of it.

Bumble bees, Bombus impatiens individually marked with plastic number tags

=== Outside the nest ===
There is also evidence that foragers, which are the insects that leave the nest to collect the valuable resources for the developing colony, can divide space outside the nest. Makino & Sakai showed that bumble bee foragers maintain foraging zones in flower patches, which means that bees consistently return to the same areas within a patch and there is little overlap between individuals. These zones can expand and contract when neighboring foragers are removed or introduced, respectively. By dividing foraging patches into miniature ‘foraging territories’, individuals can maximize the number of flowers visited with minimal interruptions or competition between foragers. These ‘foraging territories’ divided among individuals from the same colony are the result of self-organization among the foragers; that is, no lead forager is dictating where the bees will forage. Instead, the maintenance of these foraging zones is due to simple rules followed by each individual forager. Studies to determine these “rules” are an important area of research in computer science, basic biology, behavioral ecology, and mathematic modeling.

=== As an emergent property of a self-organized system ===
The self-organization observed in foraging territories is a microcosm for the self-organization seen in the entire colony. Spatial organization observed across social insect colonies can be considered an emergent property of a self-organized complex system. It is self-organized because no leader is dictating where each individual will reside, nor which task an individual will perform once they get there. Instead, zones may be a by-product of division of labor, whereby individuals end up in a particular location for a period based on the task they perform, or dominance interactions, whereby dominant individuals are granted access to the most desirable places inside the nest. Spatial patterns exhibited by individuals of social insect colonies are not obvious, because it is difficult to observe and differentiate among individuals inside a nest cavity or flying across a foraging patch. However, when careful attention is given to the individual worker, the spatial organization of workers in the nest becomes apparent.

== See also ==
- Cellular automaton
