= Insect social networks =

Insect behavior

The social networks of colonies of social insects have been extensively studied as model biological networks.

== Across taxonomy ==
=== In hymenopterans ===
Ant social networks have three main types of individuals or castes. The three types - the queen, workers, and drones - all serve a specific purpose within the colony. The queen is the reproductive member of the colony. Some ant species will only have one queen, while others will form polygynous colonies of multiple queens, such as Argentine ants Linepithema humile. The workers are responsible for supporting the queen, maintenance, and foraging. Unlike queens and drones, workers are born wingless. Some polymorphic ants can have workers who look morphologically very different from each other, with specific jobs and behaviours. Examples of these polymorphisms can be seen in the big-headed ants Pheidole dentata, where the different castes of workers (majors with large heads and minors with regular sized heads) increase colony efficiency and what the colony is able to accomplish. The drones are the only males in ant social structures, and have little to do with colony activities. Their sole purpose is to transport DNA. The drones leave the colony on a nuptial flight or mating flight, find a virgin queen to reproduce with, and then die shortly after.

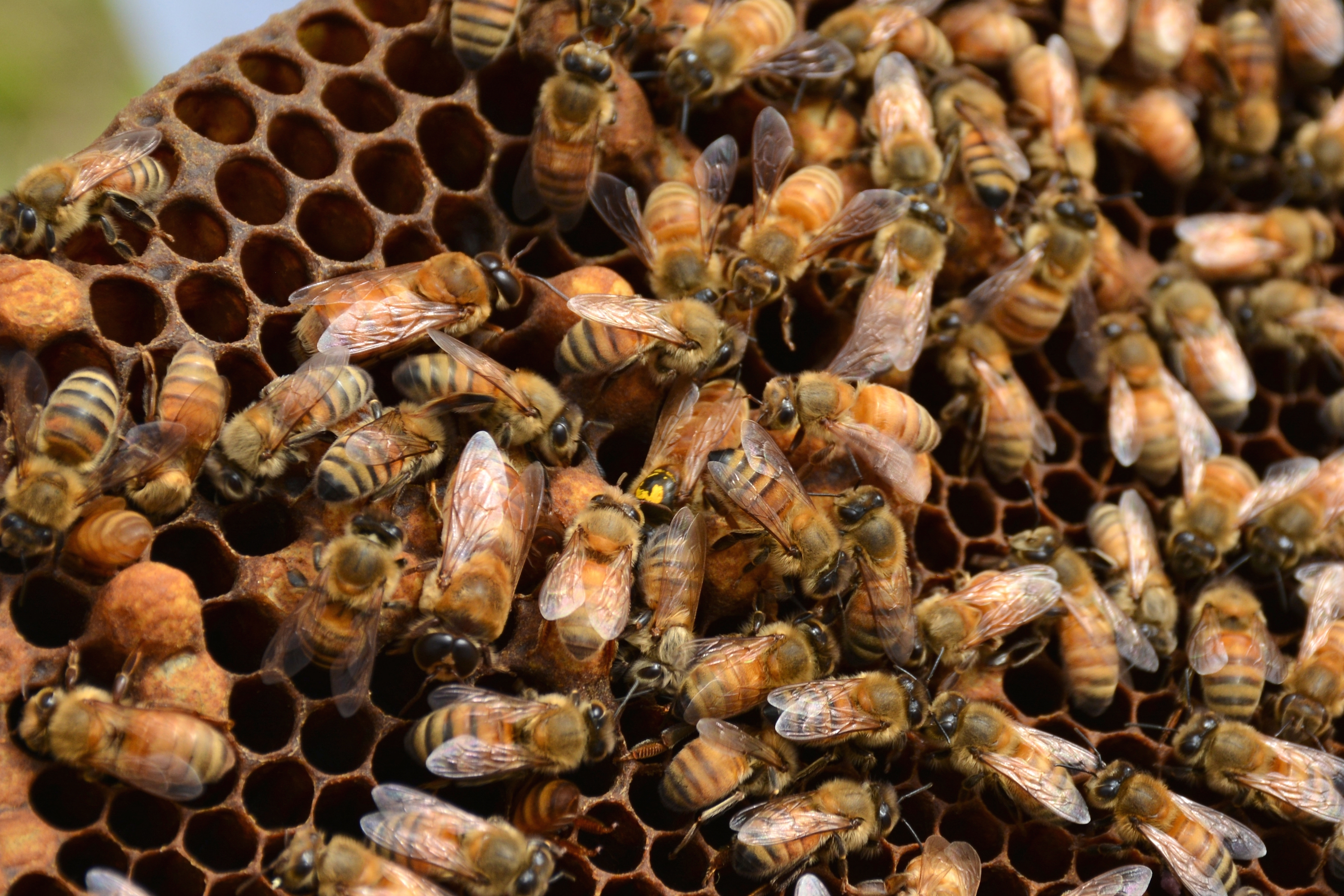
Colony of bees in a nest

Bee and wasp social structure is very similar to that of ants, except all of the members have wings. Both bees and ants communicate effectively using pheromone methods. For example, honey bees use brooding pheromone to increase eggs laid by the queen. Unlike ants, bees also use "dance language". This very complex behaviour allows foraging bees to communicate to their sisters the location of resources and dangers in the foraging space all through dancing movements. However, inside the dark chambers of the nest itself, complex pheromone systems are used to communicate and organize the group.

=== In blattodea ===
Termites, in the order Blattodea, also have an advanced social network. The termite social network evolved separately from the Hymenoptera, and has some key differences. Instead of just a reproductive queen, termites have a reproductive royal pair, the king and queen, that stay in the colony to produce offspring. The other colony members are divided into workers and soldiers. Workers and soldiers can be male or female, and lack wings, eyes, and developed sex organs, unlike the reproductive members. Workers perform all of the colony's maintenance, such as caring for young, cleaning, building tunnels, and feeding the other members. The primary goal of the soldiers is to defend and guard the entrance to the colony.

== Trophallaxis networks ==
The network of trophallaxis events differs from the network of social contacts. In the trophallaxis network of Lasius niger, foragers have higher betweenness and centrality than domestic workers. The domestic workers appear to form three clusters. There also appear to be some domestic workers which act as intermediaries between foragers and other domestic workers.

== Recruitment networks ==
In some species, during nest emigration, there is a minority of workers who actively search for new nest sites. When they find a promising site they recruit nest-mates to show them the site. The nest-mates can in turn recruit more workers and when a critical mass of ants moves back and forth between the old site and a particular new site then the whole colony moves. Recruitment generally occurs via tandem running, and the emigration process can be modelled as a directed network where edges connect workers who performed a tandem run together, and the directionality shows which worker led and which worker followed. The density and complexity of these networks appear to increase with indecision, and the core of the networks consists predominantly of the subcaste of workers specialised in finding new sites and recruiting other workers.

== Disease prevention ==
Living in large colonies in confined spaces creates a risk of pathogen spreading. Insects in social networks show many anti-pathogen behaviours to prevent the spread of infection. An example of this behaviour is the pathogen alarm behaviour in termites. If a termite detects itself being infected with pathogen spores, it will produce a vibratory signal to warn the other colony members to stay away from it to prevent the spread of the fungi.

== See also ==
- Task allocation and partitioning in social insects
