= Polyethism =

Polyethism is the term used for functional specialization of non-reproductive individuals in a colony of social organisms, particularly insects. Division of labour is considered a key aspect of eusociality and can be seen in a variety of forms. In some insects, there are distinct morphological differences among the individuals that decide their function in the colony, and this is termed as caste or morphological polyethism and is associated with polymorphism. Functions of individuals within the colony that are identical in morphology may however vary in the tasks taken up with the age of the individuals. In some species riskier activities are taken up by older individuals. This is termed as age polyethism. Time- and season-related specialization may also be termed more generically as temporal polyethism. The mechanisms involved in the control of polyethism has been an area of intense research in the field of sociobiology.

== Control of polyethism ==
Experiments have been used to examine how polyethism is controlled under different circumstances in the colony. In honey bees younger workers work within the hive and it is only the older workers which are involved in outdoor tasks such as foraging. The application of juvenile hormone to worker honey bees has been shown to alter the tasks that they undertake indicating the involvement of hormonal control. The flow of information from the nest environment related to the tasks that need to be undertaken, shortages, recruitment and the control of production of polymorphs by the reproductives has been an area of ongoing research.

== See also ==
- Task allocation and partitioning in social insects
