= Dense heterarchy =

Hierarchical organization

A dense heterarchy is a hierarchical organization in social insect colonies in which the higher levels affect the lower levels and lower levels eventually influence the higher levels. Individual ants within the colony network are likely to have many connections with one another – making the network denser and non-hierarchical. Because there is no highest level within a heterarchy but the heterarchy itself, control is decentralized (not controlled by the queen). Communication between individuals in a dense heterarchy occurs directly between individuals and through stigmergy. Feedback loops of communication can produce emergent properties not obvious when only examining singular activities or communication.
