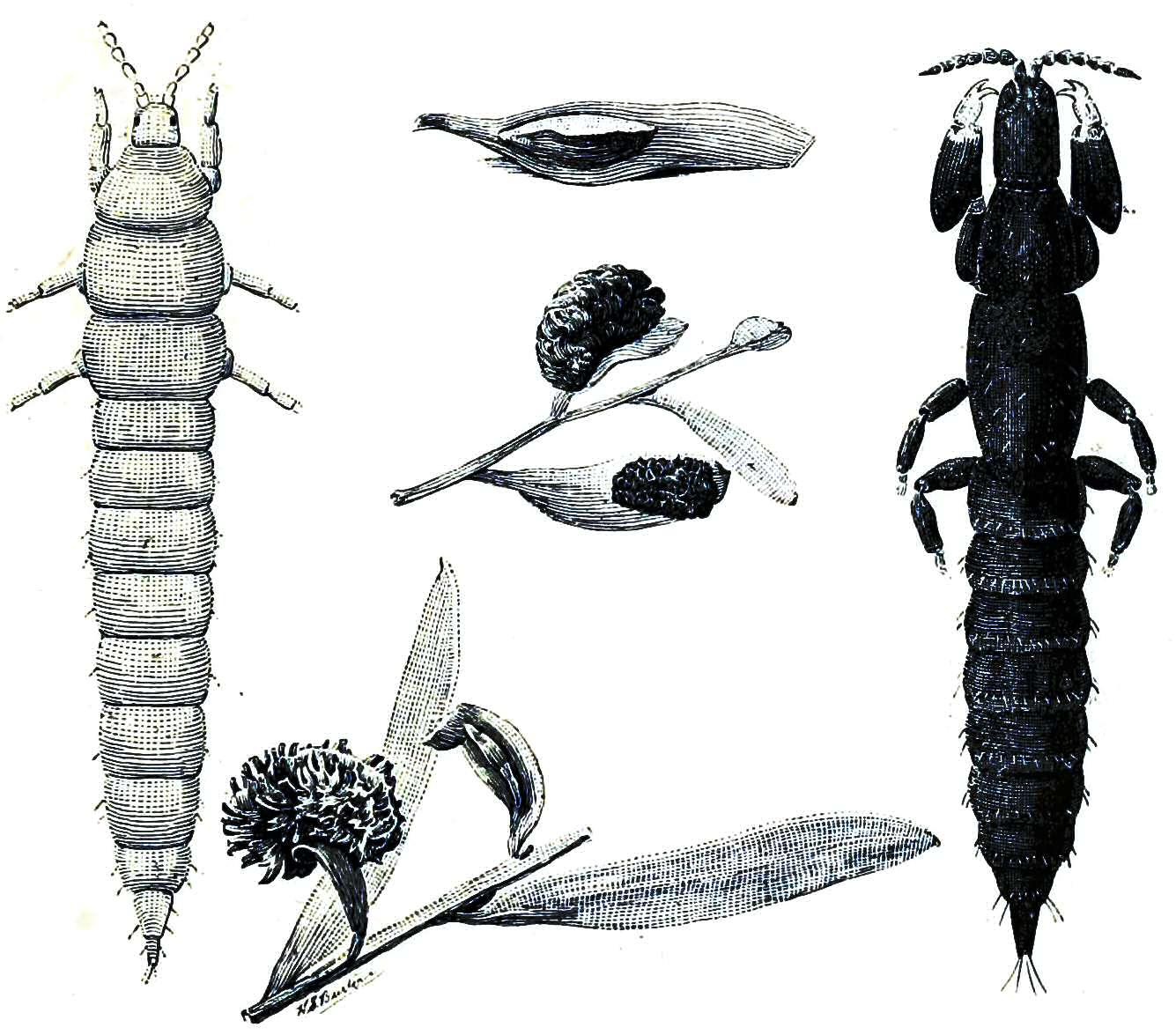

Scientific classification
- Kingdom: Animalia
- Phylum: Arthropoda
- Class: Insecta
- Order: Thysanoptera
- Family: Phlaeothripidae
- Subfamily: Phlaeothripinae
- Genus: Kladothrips; Froggatt, 1906

= Kladothrips =

Genus of thrips

Kladothrips is a genus of Australian gall thrips. It is notable for including some of the few organisms outside of Hymenoptera and Isoptera that exhibit eusociality.

== Diversity ==
The following species of Kladothrips are recognized:

- Kladothrips acaciae
- Kladothrips antennatus
- Kladothrips arotrum
- Kladothrips augonsaxxos
- Kladothrips ellobus
- Kladothrips habrus
- Kladothrips hamiltoni
- Kladothrips harpophyllae
- Kladothrips intermedius
- Kladothrips kinchega
- Kladothrips maslini
- Kladothrips morrisi
- Kladothrips nicolsoni
- Kladothrips pilbara
- Kladothrips rodwayi
- Kladothrips rugosus
- Kladothrips schwarzii
- Kladothrips sterni
- Kladothrips tepperi
- Kladothrips torus
- Kladothrips waterhousei
- Kladothrips xiphius
- Kladothrips yalgoo
- Kladothrips zygus

== Behavior ==
=== Eusociality ===
Several species of Australian gall thrips from the genus Kladothrips have been discovered to be eusocial. These organisms represent some of the few organisms outside of Hymenoptera (bees, wasps, and ants) and Isoptera (termites) that exhibit eusociality. Eusocial insects are animals that develop large, multigenerational cooperative societies that assist each other in the rearing of young, often at the cost of an individual's life or reproductive ability. Such altruism is explained in that eusocial insects benefit from giving up reproductive ability of many individuals to improve the overall fitness of closely related offspring. In order for an animal to be considered eusocial, it must satisfy the three criteria defined by E. O Wilson. The first criterion is that the species must have reproductive division of labor. Gall thrips have separate castes of reproductive macropterous (fully winged) females, some micropterous reproductive males, and many micropterous non-reproductive females. The second criterion requires that the group has overlapping generations, a phenomenon found in these gall thrips. Finally, gall thrips participate in cooperative brood care by the soldiers who protect the developing larva. This is the final criterion for eusociality.

=== Social structure ===
Macropterous, inseminated females initiate gall formation on the phyllodes of Acacia trees using their mouthparts. What follows is frequent fighting between inseminated females for ownership of the forming gall. The foundress female then lays her eggs and feeds on the phyllodes until her brood hatches and ecloses. Micropterous adults eclose first, with about a 4:1 female to male sex ratio bias. Macropterous larvae, micropterous pupae and eggs are also present. These macropterous larvae, when they eclose, mate and disperse from the gall, though some may breed for a short time into the next generation in the gall where they eclosed. Micropterous individuals are armed with large barbed forelegs for defending against attacking organisms. These individuals, often defined as soldiers, react to ruptures in the gall by swarming the opening, waiting and patrolling the area for some time, until the opening closes. It has been shown that when presented with Koptothrips (a parasitic thrips species) and other variety of extra-specific insects, the micropterous gall thrips will attack and often kill the would-be invader. In gall thrips, brood care is essentially role reversed. Thrips young are not helpless, and can immediately begin to provide for itself and to a certain extent the related individuals around them, while the soldier adults stay busy patrolling the gall for possible incursions. Thus, the brood cares for the adults.

=== Evolution of eusociality ===
The gall thrips represent a unique organism for studying the evolution and origins of eusociality, given that they are not a member of Hymenoptera or Isoptera. Another useful factor that contributes to the use of these organisms for research into eusociality is a well-defined phylogenetic tree and access to large amounts of genetic data. High relatedness of individuals within a given colony as well as haplodiploidy have been cited as heavy contributing factors to the success of eusocial insects. Gall thrips are in fact haplodiploid, meaning that most offspring (in this case the micropterous offspring) are haploid, where the parent was a diploid organism. This causes a greater-than-expected sister-sister relatedness of 0.75 and has been proposed as a theory for why eusociality has evolved, particularly in Hymenoptera. Gall thrips, however, actually exhibit not only high relatedness between sisters, but also between brother-sister, a departure from the results typical of other haplodiploid eusocial insects. This has been found to be a result of large amounts of inbreeding within a single gall. This inbreeding has been proposed to have reduced the haploidy-induced relatedness symmetries, and also allowed for an explanation of biparental care among thrips, where both males and females participate in defense of the gall. The benefit from altruistic behavior occurs in two ecological modes: "life insurers" as found in social Hymenoptera, and "fortress defenders". The fortress defender model leads to the evolution of eusociality when three criteria are met: food coinciding with shelter, selection for defense against intruders and predators, and the ability to defend such a habitat. Eusocial thrips appear to satisfy these requirements. Gall thrips maintain galls around Acacia phyllodes, a singular and vast resource for them, satisfying the first criterion. The prevalence of other, aggressive, parasitic thrips species (Koptothrips) with known instances of hostile takeover and killing of gall thrips indicates strong selection for defense. The final criterion is satisfied by soldier micropterous thrips with large barbed forelegs that assist them in defending against episodic attacks. Fortress defenders may have developed soldier caste individuals before any other specialization, given the high selective value of protecting the fortress. Perhaps the most compelling evidence, therefore, is the progressive differentiation of soldier caste thrips in Kladothrips, where soldier-to-foundress reproductive allocation corresponds to eusocial life history traits in basal and derived species of a well mapped phylogenetic tree.
