= Eusociality =

Highest level of animal sociality a species can attain

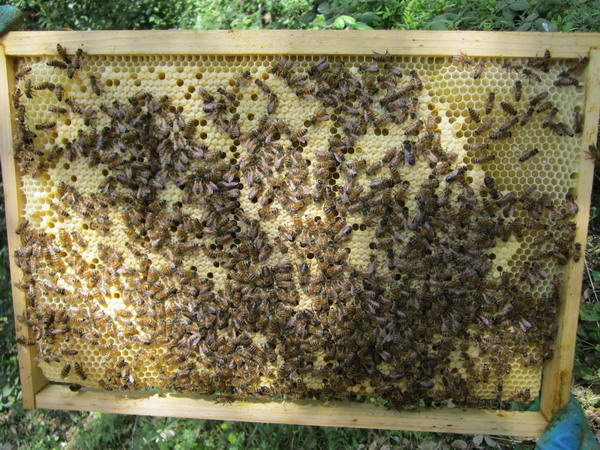
Co-operative brood rearing, seen here in honeybees, is a condition of eusociality.

Eusociality (Greek εὖ (eu), 'good' or 'true', also 'social') is the highest level of organization of sociality. It is defined by the following characteristics: cooperative brood care (including care of offspring from other individuals), overlapping generations within a colony of adults, and a division of labor into reproductive and non-reproductive groups. The division of labor creates specialized behavioral groups within an animal society, sometimes called castes. Eusociality is distinguished from all other social systems because individuals of at least one caste usually lose the ability to perform behaviors characteristic of individuals in another caste. (Narrow definitions, such as that of Crespi & Yanega, require that an irreversibly sterile caste be present, but this is not universally agreed on.) Eusocial colonies can be viewed as superorganisms.

Eusociality has evolved among the insects, crustaceans, trematodes and mammals. It is most widespread in the Hymenoptera (ants, bees, and wasps) and in termites. A colony has caste differences: queens and reproductive males take the roles of the sole reproducers, while soldiers and workers work together to create and maintain a living situation favorable for the brood. Queens produce multiple queen pheromones to create and maintain the eusocial state in their colonies; they may also eat eggs laid by other females or exert dominance by fighting. There are two eusocial rodents: the naked mole-rat and the Damaraland mole-rat. Some shrimps, such as Synalpheus regalis, are eusocial. E. O. Wilson and others have claimed that humans have evolved a weak form of eusociality. It has been suggested that the colonial and epiphytic staghorn fern, too, may make use of a primitively eusocial division of labor.

== History ==
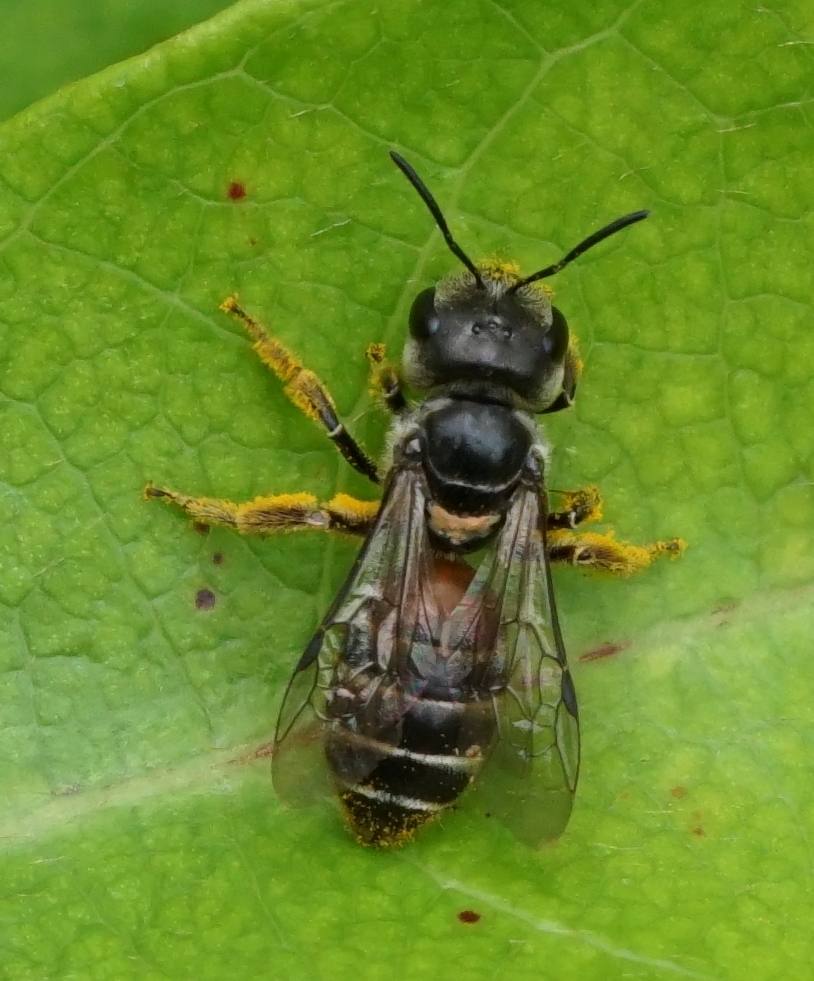
Suzanne Batra introduced the term "eusocial" after studying nesting in Halictid bees including Halictus latisignatus, pictured.

The term "eusocial" was introduced in 1966 by Suzanne Batra, who used it to describe nesting behavior in Halictid bees, on a scale of subsocial/solitary, colonial/communal, semisocial, and eusocial, where a colony is started by a single individual. Batra observed the cooperative behavior of the bees, males and females alike, as they took responsibility for at least one duty (e.g., burrowing, cell construction, oviposition) within the colony. The cooperativeness was essential as the activity of one labor division greatly influenced the activity of another. Eusocial colonies can be viewed as superorganisms, with individual castes being analogous to different tissue or cell types in a multicellular organism; castes fulfill a specific role that contributes to the functioning and survival of the whole colony, while being incapable of independent survival outside the colony.

In 1969, Charles D. Michener further expanded Batra's classification with his comparative study of social behavior in bees. He observed multiple species of bees (Apoidea) in order to investigate the different levels of animal sociality, many of which are different stages that a colony may pass through. Eusociality, which is the highest level of animal sociality a species can attain, specifically had three characteristics that distinguished it from the other levels:

1. Egg-layers and worker-like individuals among adult females (reproductive division of labor, with or without sterile castes)
2. The overlap of generations (mother and adult offspring)
3. Cooperative care of the brood

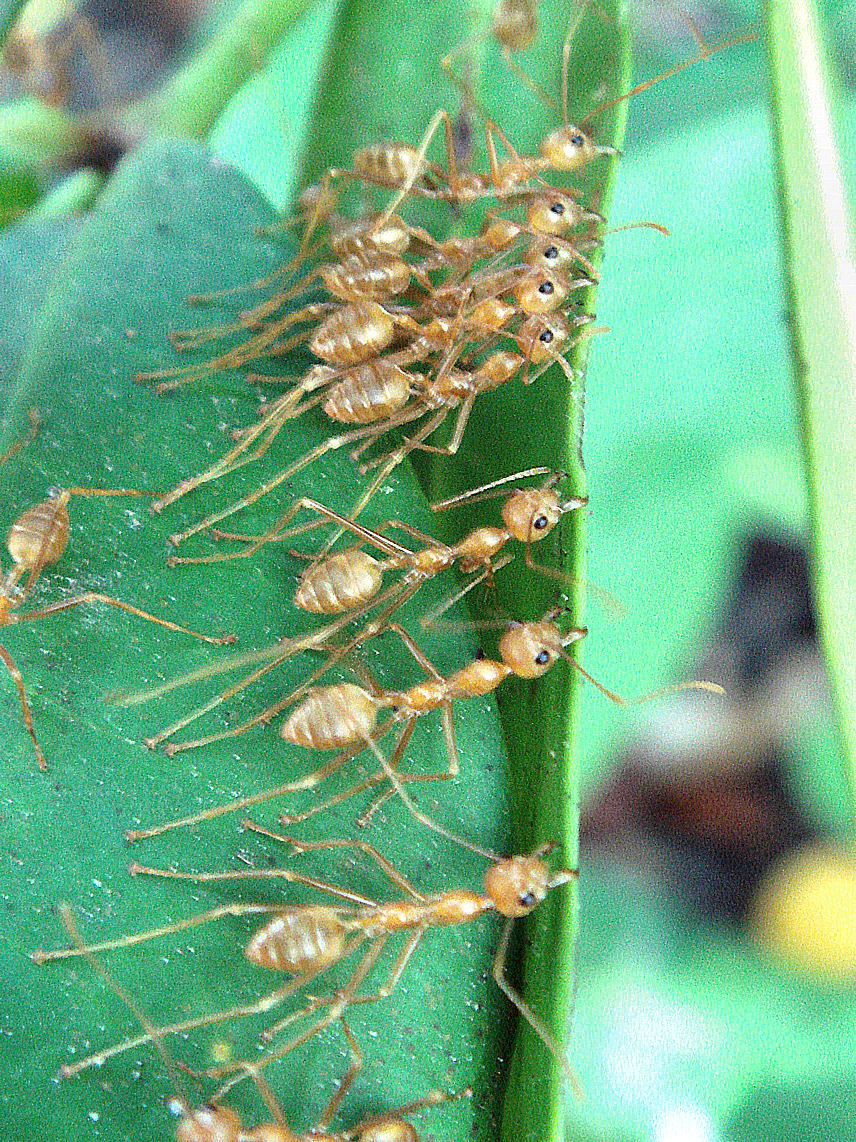
Weaver ants, here collaborating to pull nest leaves together, can be considered eusocial, as they have a permanent division of labor.

E. O. Wilson in 1971 extended the concept to include other social insects, such as ants, wasps, and termites. Originally, it was defined to include organisms (only invertebrates) that fulfilled the same three criteria defined by Michener.

Eusociality was then discovered in a group of chordates, the mole-rats.

Some researchers such as Crespi and Yanega have argued that another possibly important criterion for eusociality is "the point of no return". This is characterized by having individuals fixed into one behavioral group, usually before reproductive maturity. This prevents them from transitioning between behavioral groups, and creates a society with individuals truly dependent on each other for survival and reproductive success. For many insects, this irreversibility has changed the anatomy of the worker caste, which is sterile and provides support for the reproductive caste. This definition would exclude most cases of claimed eusociality in mammals.

Other researchers have suggested that cooperative breeding and eusociality are not discrete phenomena, but rather form a continuum of fundamentally similar social systems whose main differences lie in the distribution of lifetime reproductive success among group members. Vertebrate and invertebrate cooperative breeders can be arrayed along a common axis, that represents a standardized measure of reproductive variance. In this view, loaded terms like "primitive" and "advanced" eusociality should be dropped. An advantage of this approach is that it unites all occurrences of alloparental helping of kin under a single theoretical umbrella (e.g., Hamilton's rule).

== Diversity ==
Most eusocial societies exist in arthropods, with a few in mammals. Some ferns may exhibit a form of eusocial behavior.

=== In insects ===
Eusociality has evolved multiple times in different insect orders, including hymenopterans, termites, thrips, aphids, wasps, and beetles.

==== In hymenopterans ====
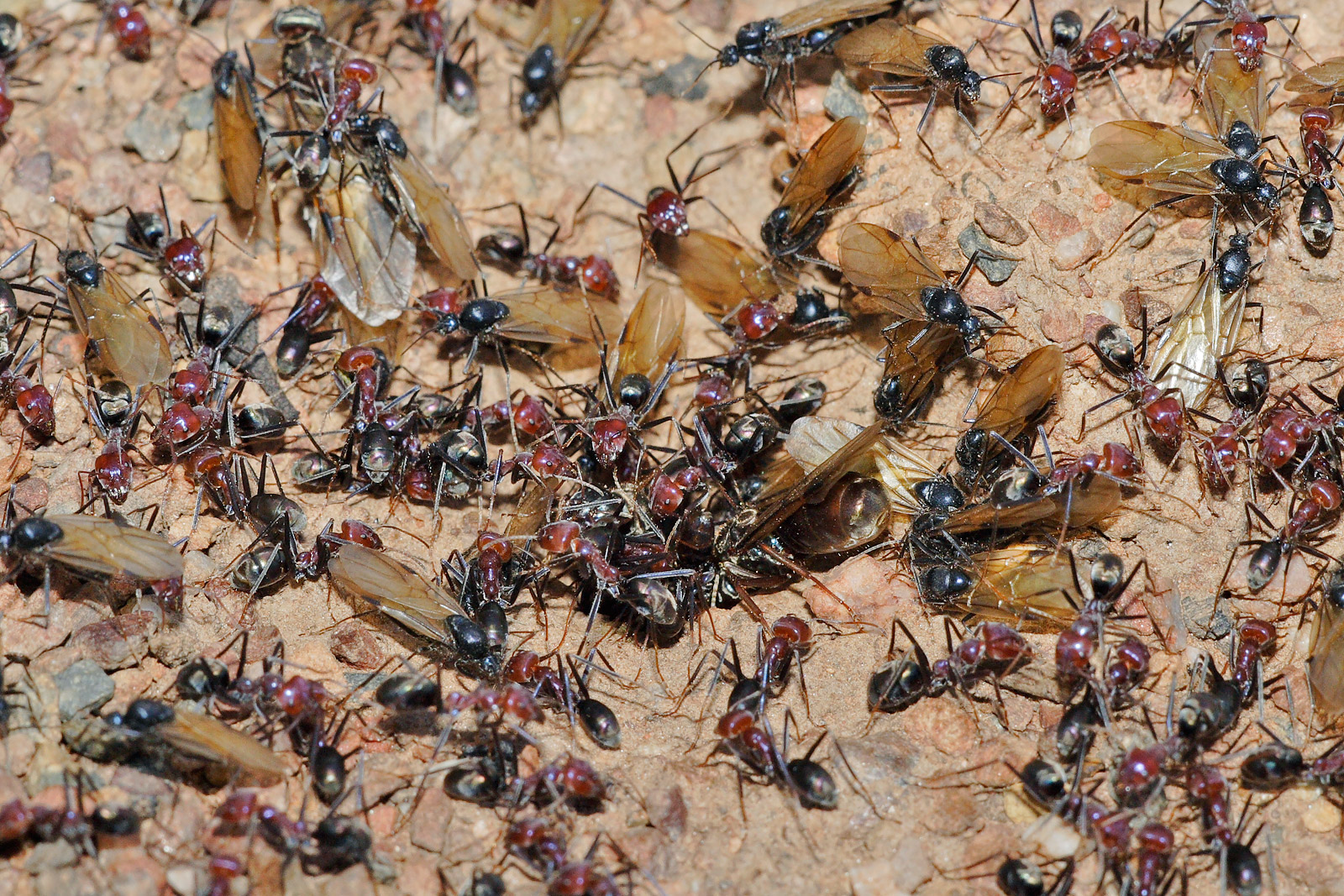
Swarming Iridomyrmex purpureus ants. The young queens are black, winged, and much larger than the wingless workers.

The order Hymenoptera contains the largest group of eusocial insects, including ants, bees, and wasps—divided into castes: reproductive queens, drones, more or less sterile workers, and sometimes also soldiers that perform specialized tasks. In the well-studied social wasp Polistes versicolor, dominant females perform tasks such as building new cells and ovipositing, while subordinate females tend to perform tasks like feeding the larvae and foraging. The task differentiation between castes can be seen in the fact that subordinates complete 81.4% of the total foraging activity, while dominants only complete 18.6% of the total foraging. Eusocial species with a sterile caste are sometimes called hypersocial.

While only a moderate percentage of species in bees (families Apidae and Halictidae) and wasps (Crabronidae and Vespidae) are eusocial, all species of ants (Formicidae) are eusocial. Some major lineages of wasps are mostly or entirely eusocial, including the subfamilies Polistinae and Vespinae. The corbiculate bees (subfamily Apinae of family Apidae) contain four tribes of varying degrees of sociality: the highly eusocial Apini (honey bees) and Meliponini (stingless bees), primitively eusocial Bombini (bumble bees), and the mostly solitary or weakly social Euglossini (orchid bees). Eusociality in these families is sometimes managed by a set of pheromones that alter the behavior of specific castes in the colony. These pheromones may act across different species, as observed in Apis andreniformis (black dwarf honey bee), where worker bees responded to queen pheromone from the related Apis florea (red dwarf honey bee). Pheromones are sometimes used in these castes to assist with foraging. Workers of the Australian stingless bee Tetragonula carbonaria, for instance, mark food sources with a pheromone, helping their nest mates to find the food.

Beside corbiculate bees, eusociality is documented within Apidae in xylocopine bees, where only simple colonies containing one or two "worker" females have been documented in the tribes Xylocopini and Ceratinini, though some members of Allodapini have larger eusocial colonies. Similarly, in the Colletidae, there is only one species reported to exhibit any form of social behavior; occasional nests of the species Amphylaeus morosus contain a female and a "guard" (a sister or daughter of the female that founded the nest), creating very small social colonies, where both females are capable of reproduction though only the foundress female appears to lay eggs. In Halictidae (sweat bees), by contrast, eusociality is well-documented in hundreds of species, primarily in the genera Halictus and Lasioglossum. In Lasioglossum aeneiventre, a halictid bee from Central America, nests may be headed by more than one female; such nests have more cells, and the number of active cells per female is correlated with the number of females in the nest, implying that having more females leads to more efficient building and provisioning of cells. In several species with only one queen, such as Lasioglossum malachurum in Europe, or Halictus rubicundus in North America, the degree of eusociality depends on the climatic zone in which the species is found - they are solitary in colder climates and social in warmer climates.

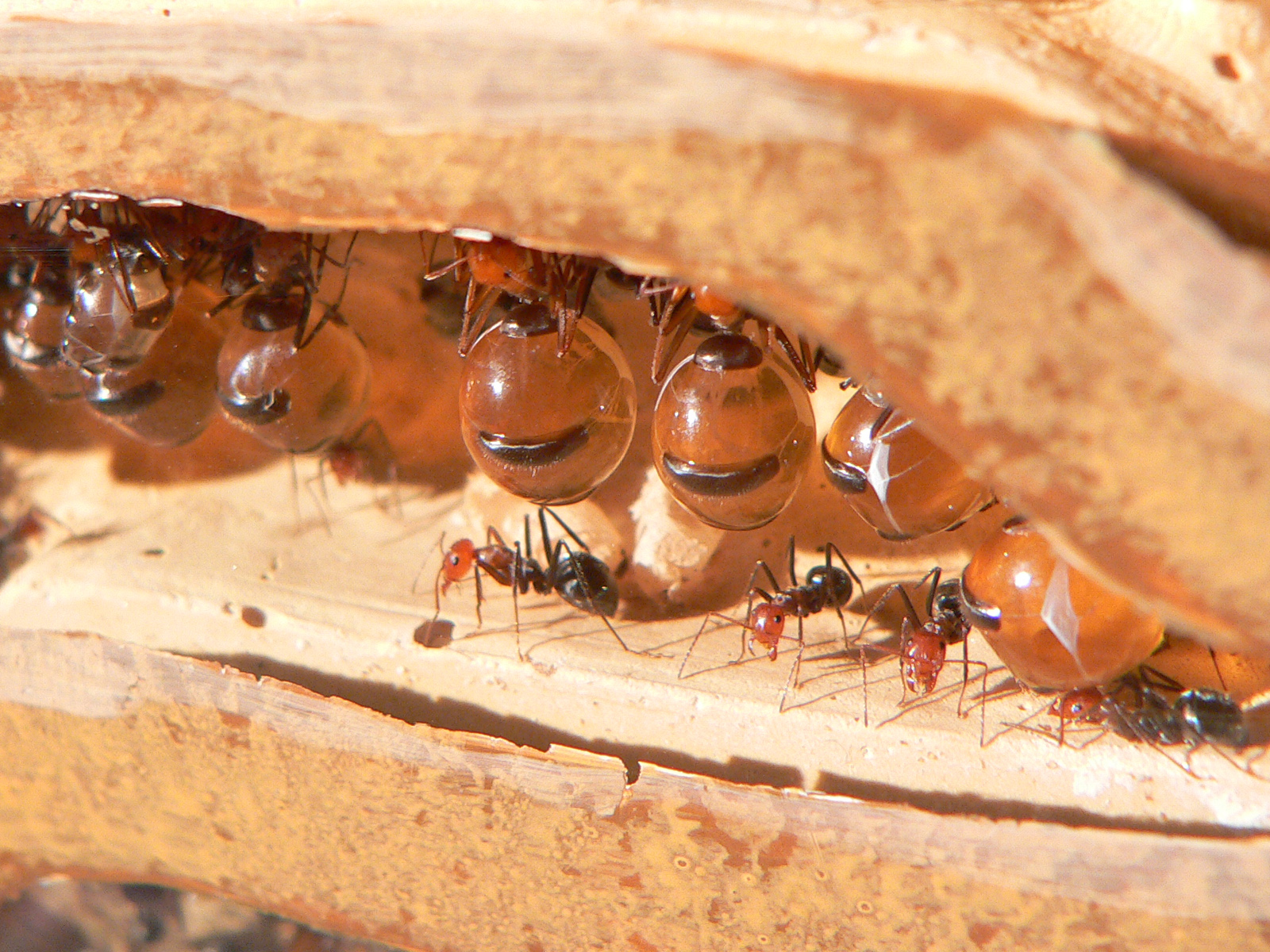
Myrmecocystus honeypot ants, showing the repletes or plerergates, their abdomens swollen to store honey (top), with ordinary workers (bottom)

Reproductive specialization in Hymenoptera generally involves the production of sterile members of the species, which carry out specialized tasks to care for the reproductive members. Individuals may have behavior and morphology modified for group defense, including self-sacrificing behavior. For example, members of the sterile caste of the honeypot ants such as Myrmecocystus fill their abdomens with liquid food until they become immobile and hang from the ceilings of the underground nests, acting as food storage for the rest of the colony. Not all social hymenopterans have distinct morphological differences between castes. For example, in the Neotropical social wasp Synoeca surinama, caste ranks are determined by social displays in the developing brood. Castes are sometimes further specialized in their behavior based on age, as in Scaptotrigona postica workers. Between approximately 0–40 days old, the workers perform tasks within the nest such as provisioning cell broods, colony cleaning, and nectar reception and dehydration. Once older than 40 days, S. postica workers move outside the nest for colony defense and foraging.

==== In termites ====
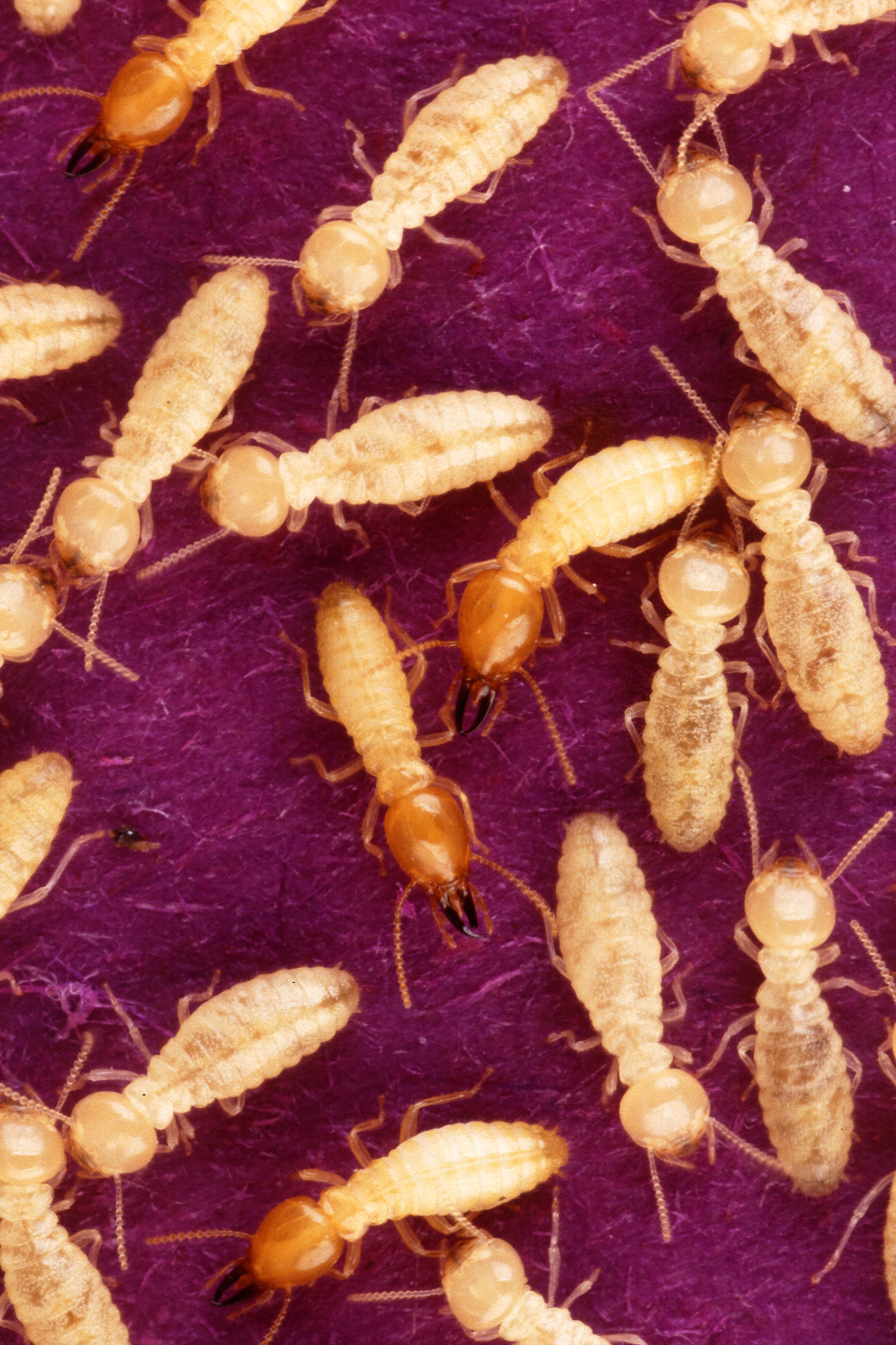
Termites live in large nests, with queen, king, soldier (red heads), and worker (pale heads) castes.

Termites (order Blattodea, infraorder Isoptera) make up another large portion of highly advanced eusocial animals. The colony is differentiated into various castes: the queen and king are the sole reproducing individuals; workers forage and maintain food and resources; and soldiers defend the colony against ant attacks. The latter two castes, which are sterile and perform highly specialized, complex social behaviors, are derived from different stages of pluripotent larvae produced by the reproductive caste. Some soldiers have jaws so enlarged (specialized for defense and attack) that they are unable to feed themselves and must be fed by workers.

==== In beetles ====
Austroplatypus incompertus is a species of ambrosia beetle native to Australia, and is the first beetle (order Coleoptera) to be recognized as eusocial. This species forms colonies in which a single female is fertilized, and is protected by many unfertilized females, which serve as workers excavating tunnels in trees. This species has cooperative brood care, in which individuals care for juveniles that are not their own.

==== In gall-inducing insects ====
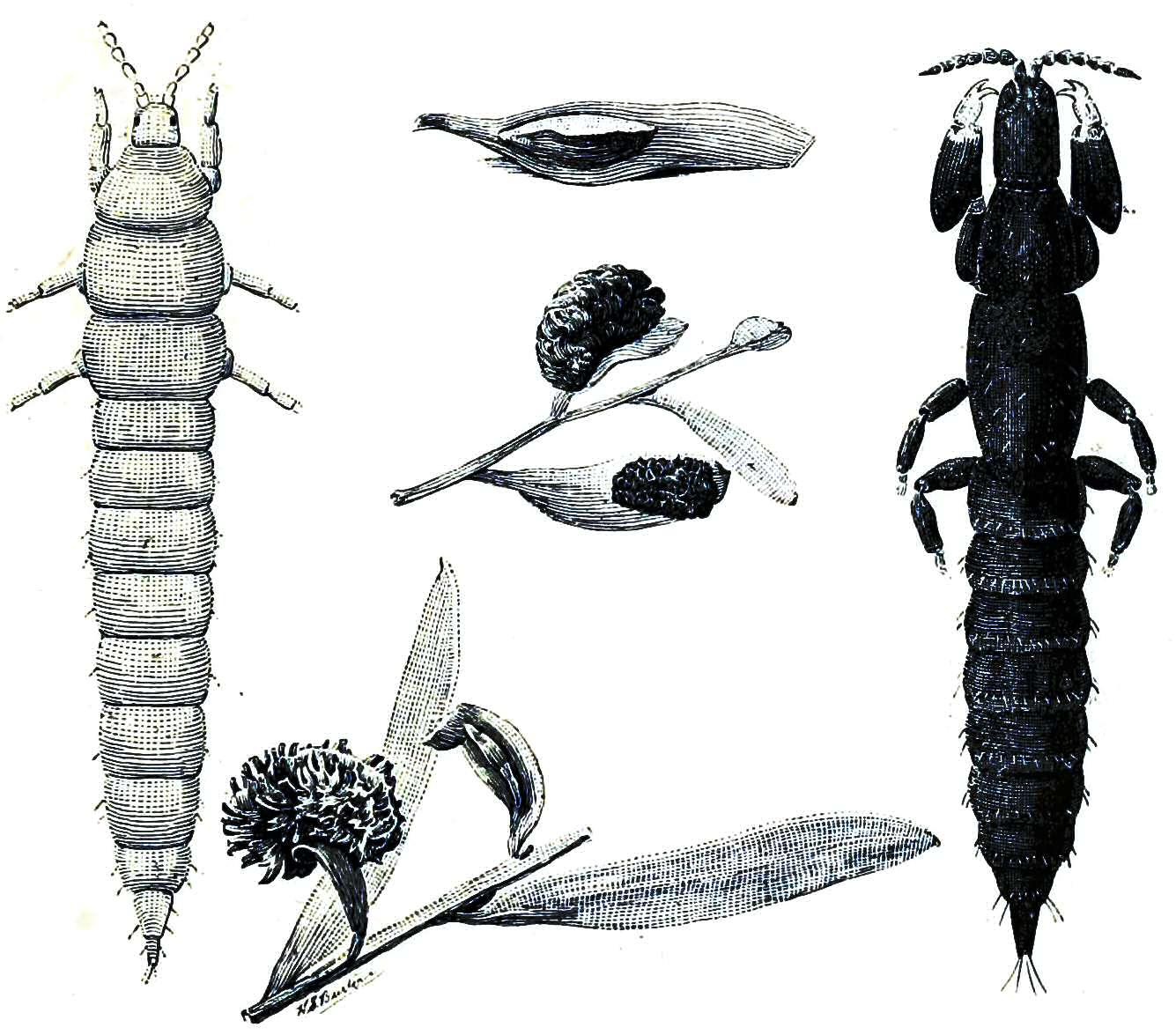
Kladothrips rugosa, a gall-forming thrips (larva on left, adult on right) with galls (centre) on Acacia leaves. Its soldier caste defends the colony in its gall fortress.

Some gall-inducing insects, including the gall-forming aphid, Pemphigus spyrothecae (order Hemiptera), and thrips such as Kladothrips (order Thysanoptera), are described as eusocial. These species have very high relatedness among individuals due to their asexual reproduction (sterile soldier castes being clones produced by parthenogenesis), but the gall-inhabiting behavior gives these species a defensible resource. They produce soldier castes for fortress defense and protection of the colony against predators, kleptoparasites, and competitors. In these groups, eusociality is produced by both high relatedness and by living in a restricted, shared area.

=== In crustaceans ===
Eusociality has evolved in three different lineages in the colonial crustacean genus Synalphaeus. These parasitic shrimps rely on fortress defense and live in groups of closely related individuals in tropical reefs and sponges. They live eusocially with a single breeding female, and a large number of male defenders armed with enlarged snapping claws. There is a single shared living space for the colony members, and the non-breeding members act to defend it.

The fortress defense hypothesis additionally points out that because sponges provide both food and shelter, there is an aggregation of relatives (because the shrimp do not have to disperse to find food), and much competition for those nesting sites. Being the target of attack promotes a good defense system (soldier caste); soldiers promote the fitness of the whole nest by ensuring safety and reproduction of the queen.

Eusociality offers a competitive advantage in shrimp populations. Eusocial species are more abundant, occupy more of the habitat, and use more of the available resources than non-eusocial species.

=== In trematodes ===
The trematodes are a class of parasitic flatworm, also known as flukes. One species, Haplorchis pumilio, has evolved eusociality involving a colony creating a class of sterile soldiers. One fluke invades a host and establishes a colony of dozens to thousands of clones that work together to take it over. Since rival trematode species can invade and replace the colony, it is protected by a specialized caste of sterile soldier trematodes. Soldiers are smaller, more mobile, and develop along a different pathway than sexually mature reproductives. One difference is that a soldier's mouthparts (pharynx) is five times as big as those of the reproductives. They make up nearly a quarter of the volume of the soldier. These soldiers do not have a germinal mass, never metamorphose to be reproductive, and are, therefore, obligately sterile. Soldiers are readily distinguished from the immature and mature reproductive worms. Soldiers are more aggressive than reproductives, attacking heterospecific trematodes that infect their host in vitro. H. pumilio soldiers do not attack conspecifics from other colonies. The soldiers are not evenly distributed throughout the host body. They are found in the highest numbers in the basal visceral mass, where competing trematodes tend to multiply during the early phase of infection. This strategic positioning allows them to effectively defend against invaders, similar to how soldier distribution patterns are seen in other animals with defensive castes. They "appear to be an obligately sterile physical caste, akin to that of the most advanced social insects".

=== In nonhuman mammals ===
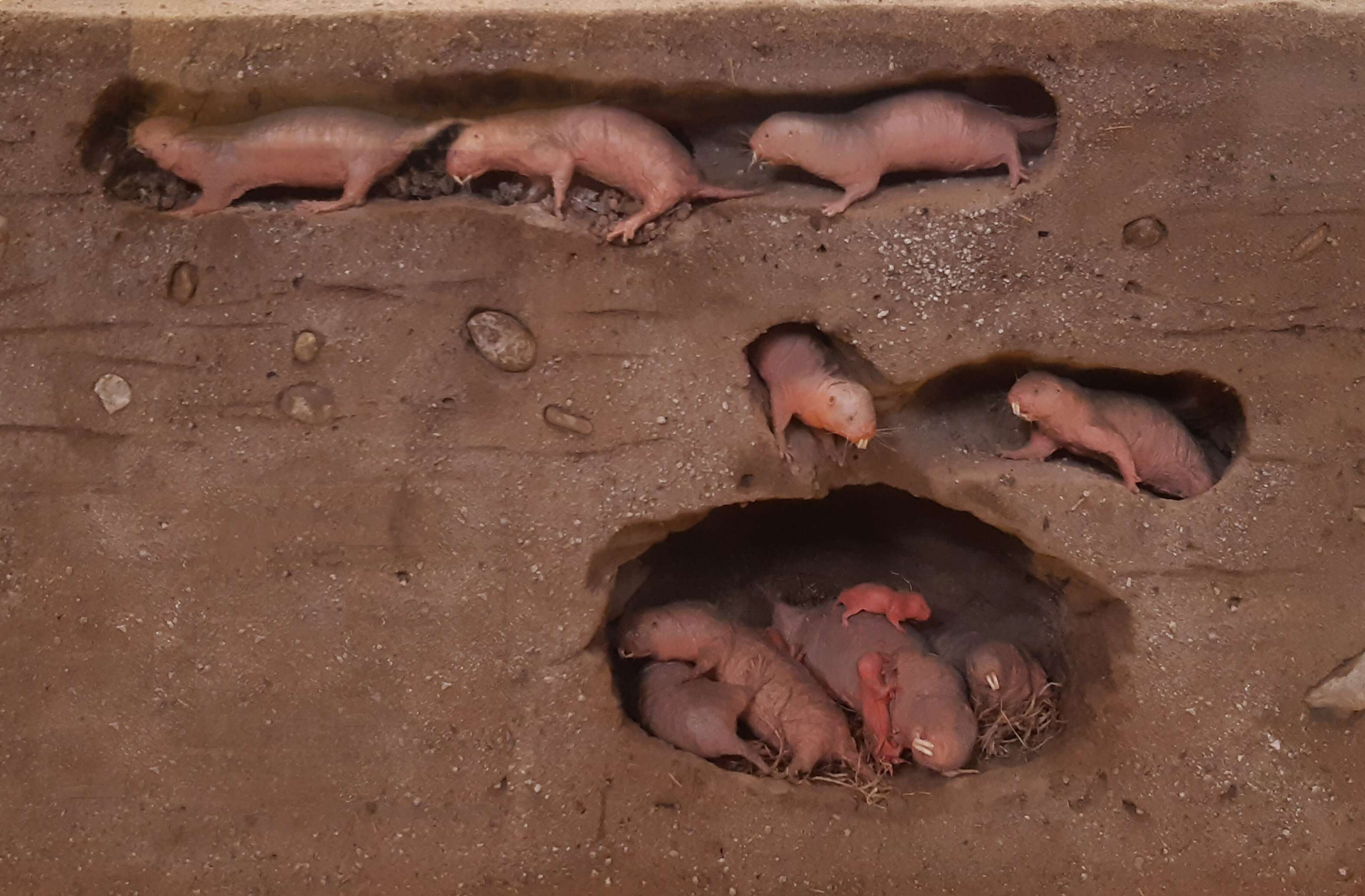
Model of naked mole-rat burrow with soldiers, workers, and queen, a social structure similar to the castes of the eusocial insects

Among mammals, two species in the rodent group Phiomorpha are eusocial, the naked mole-rat (Heterocephalus glaber) and the Damaraland mole-rat (Fukomys damarensis), both of which are highly inbred. These mole-rats live in harsh, limiting environments, where dispersal is difficult and dangerous and cooperation is required to find food and defend against predators. Most colony members are workers, and they cooperatively care for offspring of a single reproductive female (the queen) to whom they are closely related. These mole-rats are eusocial under any definition of the term. Interestingly, the discovery of male and female dispersers has revealed that there is a mechanism of inter-colony outbreeding in naked mole-rats. Outbreeding reduces intra-colony genetic relatedness, but reduces inbreeding depression. Dispersers are morphologically, physiologically and behaviorally distinct from colony members and actively seek to leave their burrow when an escape opportunity presents itself. These individuals are equipped with generous fat reserves for their journey. Though they possess high levels of luteinizing hormone, dispersers are only interested in mating with individuals from foreign colonies rather than their own colony's queen. They also show little interest in working cooperatively with workers in their natal colony. Hence, disperser morphs are well-prepared to promote the establishment of new, initially outbred colonies, before cycles of inbreeding resume.

Some mammals in the Carnivora and Primates have eusocial tendencies, especially meerkats (Suricata suricatta) and dwarf mongooses (Helogale parvula). These show cooperative breeding and marked reproductive skews. In the dwarf mongoose, the breeding pair receives food priority and protection from subordinates and rarely has to defend against predators.

=== In humans ===
Scientists have debated whether humans are prosocial or eusocial. Edward O. Wilson called humans eusocial apes, arguing for similarities to ants, and observing that early hominins cooperated to rear their children while other members of the same group hunted and foraged. Wilson and others argued that through cooperation and teamwork, ants and humans form superorganisms. Human reproductive labor can be considered as being divided between castes if one treats menopausal women as a sterile caste.

Critics of group selection theory such as Richard Dawkins reject this argument. They reject the view that human reproductive labor can be viewed as being divided between castes.

Though controversial, it has been suggested that homosexuality in men and menopause could have evolved through kin selection. This would mean that humans sometimes exhibit a type of alloparental behavior known as "helpers at the nest", with juveniles and sexually mature adolescents helping their parents raise subsequent broods, as in some birds, some bees without sterile castes, and meerkats. In these species, the helpers reproduce on their own if given the opportunity. Whether these animals are considered eusocial depends on whether "eusociality" definition requires a sterile caste, which as mentioned above is a subject of disagreement.

=== In plants ===
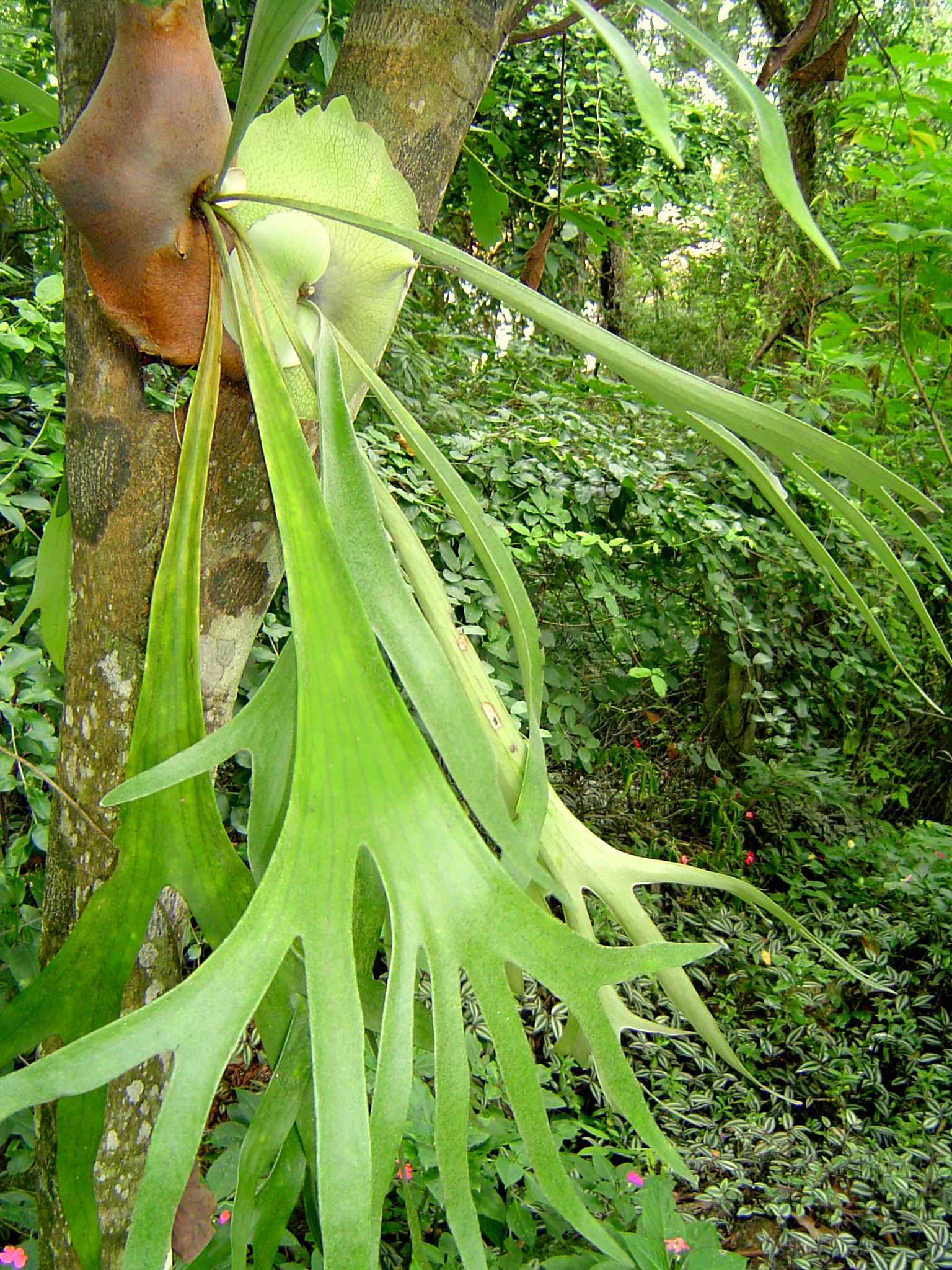
The staghorn fern Platycerium bifurcatum may display a simple form of eusociality.

One plant, the epiphytic staghorn fern, Platycerium bifurcatum (Polypodiaceae), may exhibit a primitive form of eusocial behavior amongst clones. The evidence for this is that individuals live in colonies, where they are structured in different ways, with fronds of differing size and shape, to collect and store water and nutrients for the colony to use. At the top of a colony, there are both pleated fan-shaped "nest" fronds that collect and hold water, and gutter-shaped "strap" fronds that channel water: no solitary Platycerium species has both types. At the bottom of a colony, there are "nest" fronds that clasp the trunk of the tree supporting the fern, and drooping photosynthetic fronds. These are argued to be adapted to support the colony structurally, i.e. that the individuals in the colony are to some degree specialized for tasks, a division of labor.

== Evolution ==
=== Phylogenetic distribution ===
Eusociality is a rare but widespread phenomenon in species in at least seven orders in the animal kingdom, as shown in the phylogenetic tree (non-eusocial groups not shown). All species of termites are eusocial, and it is believed that they were the first eusocial animals to evolve, sometime in the Late Jurassic period (~150 million years ago). The other orders shown contain both eusocial and non-eusocial species, including many lineages where eusociality is inferred to be the ancestral state. Thus the number of independent evolutions of eusociality (clades) is not known. The major eusocial groups are shown in boldface in the phylogenetic tree.

- Eukaryotes
  - Plantae
    Staghorn fern Platycerium bifurcatum
  - Animalia
    - Chordata
      some Mole-rats
    - Arthropoda
      - Decapoda
        Synalpheus spp.
      - Insecta
        - Blattodea
          - all **Termites** (150 mya)
        - Eumetabola
          - Paraneoptera
            - Hemiptera
              various Aphids
            - Thysanoptera
              Kladothrips spp.
          - Holometabola
            - Coleoptera
              Austroplatypus incompertus
            - Hymenoptera
              - many **Vespidae** (wasps)
              - - all **Ants** (100 mya)
                - many **Bees**

=== Paradox ===
Prior to the gene-centered view of evolution, eusociality was seen as paradoxical: if adaptive evolution unfolds by differential reproduction of individual organisms, the evolution of individuals incapable of passing on their genes presents a challenge. In On the Origin of Species, Darwin referred to the existence of sterile castes as the "one special difficulty, which at first appeared to me insuperable, and actually fatal to my theory". Darwin anticipated that a possible resolution to the paradox might lie in the close family relationship, which W.D. Hamilton quantified a century later with his 1964 inclusive fitness theory. After the gene-centered view of evolution was developed in the mid-1970s, non-reproductive individuals were seen as an extended phenotype of the genes, which are the primary beneficiaries of natural selection.

=== Inclusive fitness and haplodiploidy ===
==== Argument that haplodiploidy favors eusociality ====
Honey bees are haplodiploid, with haploid males and diploid females. It has been suggested that this organisation favours eusociality, but haplodiploidy is neither necessary nor sufficient for eusociality to emerge.

According to inclusive fitness theory, organisms can gain fitness by increasing the reproductive output of other individuals that share their genes, especially their close relatives. Natural selection favors individuals to help their relatives when the cost of helping is less than the benefit gained by their relative multiplied by the fraction of genes that they share, i.e. when Cost < relatedness * Benefit. W. D. Hamilton suggested in 1964 that eusociality could evolve more easily among haplodiploid species such as Hymenoptera, because of their unusual relatedness structure.

In haplodiploid species, females develop from fertilized eggs and males develop from unfertilized eggs. Because a male is haploid, his daughters share 100% of his genes and 50% of their mother's. Therefore, they share 75% of their genes with each other. This mechanism of sex determination gives rise to what W. D. Hamilton first termed "supersisters", more closely related to their sisters than they would be to their own offspring. Even though workers often do not reproduce, they can pass on more of their genes by helping to raise their sisters than by having their own offspring (each of which would only have 50% of their genes). This unusual situation, where females may have greater fitness when they help rear sisters rather than producing offspring, is often invoked to explain the multiple independent evolutions of eusociality (at least nine separate times) within the Hymenoptera.

==== Argument that haplodiploidy does not favor eusociality ====
Against the supposed benefits of haplodiploidy for eusociality, Robert Trivers notes that while females share 75% of genes with their sisters in haplodiploid populations, they only share 25% of their genes with their brothers. Accordingly, the average relatedness of an individual to their sibling is 50%. Therefore, helping behavior is only advantageous if it is biased to helping sisters, which would drive the population to a 1:3 sex ratio of males to females. At this ratio, males, as the rarer sex, increase in reproductive value, reducing the benefit of female-biased investment.

Further, not all eusocial species are haplodiploid: termites, some snapping shrimps, and mole rats are not. Conversely, non-eusocial bees are also haplodiploid, and among eusocial species many queens mate with multiple males, resulting in a hive of half-sisters that share only 25% of their genes. The association between haplodiploidy and eusociality is below statistical significance. Haplodiploidy is thus neither necessary nor sufficient for eusociality to emerge. Relatedness does still play a part, as monogamy (queens mating singly) is the ancestral state for all eusocial species so far investigated. If kin selection is an important force driving the evolution of eusociality, monogamy should be the ancestral state, because it maximizes the relatedness of colony members.

== Evolutionary ecology ==
Increased parasitism and predation rates are the primary ecological drivers of social organization. Group living affords colony members defense against enemies, specifically predators, parasites, and competitors, and allows them to gain advantage from superior foraging methods. The importance of ecology in the evolution of eusociality is supported by evidence such as experimentally induced reproductive division of labor, for example when normally solitary queens are forced together. Conversely, female Damaraland mole-rats undergo hormonal changes that promote dispersal after periods of high rainfall.

Climate too appears to be a selective agent driving social complexity; across bee lineages and Hymenoptera in general, higher forms of sociality are more likely to occur in tropical than temperate environments. Similarly, social transitions within halictid bees, where eusociality has been gained and lost multiple times, are correlated with periods of climatic warming. Social behavior in facultative social bees is often reliably predicted by ecological conditions, and switches in behavioral type have been experimentally induced by translocating offspring of solitary or social populations to warm and cool climates. In H. rubicundus, females produce a single brood in cooler regions and two or more broods in warmer regions, so the former populations are solitary while the latter are social. In another species of sweat bees, L. calceatum, social phenotype has been predicted by altitude and micro-habitat composition, with social nests found in warmer, sunnier sites, and solitary nests found in adjacent, cooler, shaded locations. Facultatively social bee species, however, which comprise the majority of social bee diversity, have their lowest diversity in the tropics, being largely limited to temperate regions.

=== Multilevel selection ===
Once pre-adaptations such as group formation, nest building, high cost of dispersal, and morphological variation are present, between-group competition has been suggested as a driver of the transition to advanced eusociality. M. A. Nowak, C. E. Tarnita, and E. O. Wilson proposed in 2010 that since eusociality produces an extremely altruistic society, eusocial groups should out-reproduce their less cooperative competitors, eventually eliminating all non-eusocial groups from a species. Multilevel selection has been heavily criticized for its conflict with the kin selection theory.

=== Reversal to solitarity ===
A reversal to solitarity is an evolutionary phenomenon in which descendants of a eusocial group evolve solitary behavior once again. Bees have been model organisms for the study of reversal to solitarity, because of the diversity of their social systems. Each of the four origins of eusociality in bees was followed by at least one reversal to solitarity, giving a total of at least nine reversals. In a few species, solitary and eusocial colonies appear simultaneously in the same population, and different populations of the same species may be fully solitary or eusocial. This suggests that eusociality is costly to maintain, and can only persist when ecological variables favor it. Disadvantages of eusociality include the cost of investing in non-reproductive offspring, and an increased risk of disease.

All reversals to solitarity have occurred among primitively eusocial groups; none have followed the emergence of advanced eusociality. The "point of no return" hypothesis posits that the morphological differentiation of reproductive and non-reproductive castes prevents highly eusocial species such as the honeybee from reverting to the solitary state.

== Physiology and development ==
=== Pheromones ===
Pheromones play an important role in the physiological mechanisms of eusociality. Enzymes involved in the production and perception of pheromones were important for the emergence of eusociality within both termites and hymenopterans. The best-studied queen pheromone system in social insects is that of the honey bee Apis mellifera. Queen mandibular glands produce a mixture of five compounds, three aliphatic and two aromatic, which control workers. Mandibular gland extracts inhibit workers from constructing queen cells, which can delay the hormonally based behavioral development of workers and suppress their ovarian development. Both behavioral effects mediated by the nervous system often leading to recognition of queens (releaser) and physiological effects on the reproductive and endocrine system (primer) are attributed to the same pheromones. These pheromones volatilize or are deactivated within thirty minutes, allowing workers to respond rapidly to the loss of their queen.

The levels of two of the aliphatic compounds increase rapidly in virgin queens within the first week after emergence from the pupa, consistent with their roles as sex attractants during the mating flight. Once a queen is mated and begins laying eggs, she starts producing the full blend of compounds. In several ant species, reproductive activity is associated with pheromone production by queens. Mated egg-laying queens are attractive to workers, whereas young winged virgin queens elicit little or no response.

Physiology of eusociality in fire ants: three queen pheromones help to create and maintain the eusocial state of the colony. Loss of a primer pheromone triggers the development of replacement queens (dashed lines).

Among ants, the queen pheromone system of the fire ant Solenopsis invicta includes both releaser and primer pheromones. A queen recognition (releaser) pheromone is stored in the poison sac along with three other compounds. These compounds elicit a behavioral response from workers. Several primer effects have also been demonstrated. Pheromones initiate reproductive development in new winged females, called female sexuals. These chemicals inhibit workers from rearing male and female sexuals, suppress egg production in other queens of multiple queen colonies, and cause workers to execute excess queens. These pheromones maintain the eusocial phenotype, with one queen supported by sterile workers and sexually active males (drones). In queenless colonies, the lack of queen pheromones causes winged females to quickly shed their wings, develop ovaries and lay eggs. These virgin replacement queens assume the role of the queen and start to produce queen pheromones. Similarly, queen weaver ants Oecophylla longinoda have exocrine glands that produce pheromones which prevent workers from laying reproductive eggs.

Similar mechanisms exist in the eusocial wasp Vespula vulgaris. For a queen to dominate all the workers, usually numbering more than 3000 in a colony, she signals her dominance with pheromones. The workers regularly lick the queen while feeding her, and the air-borne pheromone from the queen's body alerts those workers of her dominance.

The mode of action of inhibitory pheromones which prevent the development of eggs in workers has been demonstrated in the bumble bee Bombus terrestris. The pheromones suppress activity of the endocrine gland, the corpus allatum, stopping it from secreting juvenile hormone. With low juvenile hormone, eggs do not mature. Similar inhibitory effects of lowering juvenile hormone were seen in halictine bees and polistine wasps, but not in honey bees.

=== Other mechanisms ===
A variety of other mechanisms give queens of different species of social insects a measure of reproductive control over their nest mates. In many Polistes wasps, monogamy is established soon after colony formation by physical dominance interactions among foundresses of the colony including biting, chasing, and food soliciting. Such interactions create a dominance hierarchy headed by larger, older individuals with the greatest ovarian development. The rank of subordinates is correlated with the degree of ovarian development. Workers do not oviposit when queens are present, for a variety of reasons: colonies tend to be small enough that queens can effectively dominate workers; queens practice selective oophagy; the flow of nutrients favors queen over workers; and queens rapidly lay eggs in new or vacated cells.

In primitively eusocial bees (where castes are morphologically similar and colonies are small and short-lived), queens frequently nudge their nest mates and then burrow back down into the nest. This draws workers into the lower part of the nest where they may respond to stimuli for cell construction and maintenance. Being nudged by the queen may help to inhibit ovarian development; in addition, the queen eats any eggs laid by workers. Furthermore, temporally discrete production of workers and gynes (actual or potential queens) can cause size dimorphisms between different castes, as size is strongly influenced by the season during which the individual is reared. In many wasps, worker caste is determined by a temporal pattern in which workers precede non-workers of the same generation. In some cases, for example in bumblebees, queen control weakens late in the season, and the ovaries of workers develop. The queen attempts to maintain her dominance by aggressive behavior and by eating worker-laid eggs; her aggression is often directed towards the worker with the greatest ovarian development.

In highly eusocial wasps (where castes are morphologically dissimilar), both the quantity and quality of food are important for caste differentiation. Recent studies in wasps suggest that differential larval nourishment may be the environmental trigger for larval divergence into workers or gynes. All honey bee larvae are initially fed with royal jelly, which is secreted by workers, but normally they are switched over to a diet of pollen and honey as they mature; if their diet is exclusively royal jelly, they grow larger than normal and differentiate into queens. This jelly contains a specific protein, royalactin, which increases body size, promotes ovary development, and shortens the developmental time period. The differential expression in Polistes of larval genes and proteins (also differentially expressed during queen versus caste development in honey bees) indicates that regulatory mechanisms may operate very early in development.

== In popular culture ==
Stephen Baxter's 2003 science fiction novel Coalescent imagines a human eusocial organization founded in ancient Rome, in which most individuals are subject to reproductive repression. Harold Fromm, reviewing Groping for Groups by E. O. Wilson and others in The Hudson Review, asks whether Wilson's stated "wish" for humans to bring about "a permanent paradise for human beings" would mean "to be group-selected in factories in the style of Huxley's [1932 novel] Brave New World.

The 1973 novel Hellstrom's Hive by Frank Herbert revolves around a secret society made up entirely of a race of bioengineered insect-like humanoids that is modeled after the behavior of social insect species.

== See also ==
- Dense heterarchy
- Evolutionarily stable strategy
- International Union for the Study of Social Insects
- Patterns of self-organization in ants
- Reciprocity (social psychology)
- Stigmergy
  - Ant colony optimization (ACO)
  - Bee colony optimization
- Task allocation and partitioning of social insects
