= Task allocation and partitioning in social insects =

Task allocation and partitioning is the way that tasks are chosen, assigned, subdivided, and coordinated within a colony of social insects. Task allocation and partitioning gives rise to the division of labor often observed in social insect colonies, whereby individuals specialize on different tasks within the colony (e.g., "foragers", "nurses"). Communication is closely related to the ability to allocate tasks among individuals within a group. This entry focuses exclusively on social insects. For information on human task allocation and partitioning, see division of labour, task analysis, and workflow.

== Definitions ==
- Task allocation "... is the process that results in specific workers being engaged in specific tasks, in numbers appropriate to the current situation. [It] operates without any central or hierarchical control..." The concept of task allocation is individual-centric. It focuses on decisions by individuals about what task to perform. However, different biomathematical models give different weights to inter-individual interactions vs. environmental stimuli.
- Task partitioning is the division of one task into sequential actions done by more than one individual. The focus here is on the task, and its division, rather than on the individuals performing it. For example, "hygienic behavior" is a task in which worker bees uncap and remove diseased brood cells that may be affected by American foulbrood (Paenibacillus larvae) or the parasitic mite Varroa destructor. In this case, individual bees often focus on either uncapping or removing diseased brood. Therefore, the task is partitioned, and performed by multiple individuals.

== Introduction ==
Social living provides a multitude of advantages to its practitioners, including predation risk reduction, environmental buffering, food procurement, and possible mating advantages. The most advanced form of sociality is eusociality, characterized by overlapping generations, cooperative care of the young, and reproductive division of labor, which includes sterility or near-sterility of the overwhelming majority of colony members. With few exceptions, all the practitioners of eusociality are insects of the orders Hymenoptera (ants, bees, and wasps), Isoptera (termites), Thysanoptera (thrips), and Hemiptera (aphids). Social insects have been extraordinarily successful ecologically and evolutionarily. This success has at its most pronounced produced colonies 1) having a persistence many times the lifespan of most individuals of the colony, and 2) numbering thousands or even millions of individuals. Social insects can exhibit division of labor with respect to non-reproductive tasks, in addition to the aforementioned reproductive one. In some cases this takes the form of markedly different, alternative morphological development (polymorphism), as in the case of soldier castes in ants, termites, thrips, and aphids, while in other cases it is age-based (temporal polyethism), as with honey bee foragers, who are the oldest members of the colony (with the exception of the queen). Evolutionary biologists are still debating the fitness-advantage gained by social insects due to their advanced division of labor and task allocation, but hypotheses include: increased resilience against a fluctuating environment, reduced energy costs of continuously switching tasks, increased longevity of the colony as a whole, or reduced rate of pathogen transmission. Division of labor, large colony sizes, temporally-changing colony needs, and the value of adaptability and efficiency under Darwinian competition, all form a theoretical basis favoring the existence of evolved communication in social insects. Beyond the rationale, there is well-documented empirical evidence of communication related to tasks; examples include the waggle dance of honey bee foragers, trail marking by ant foragers such as the red harvester ants, and the propagation via pheromones of an alarm state in Africanized honey bees.

== Worker Polymorphism ==
One of the most well known mechanisms of task allocation is worker polymorphism, where workers within a colony have morphological differences. This difference in size is determined by the amount of food workers are fed as larvae, and is set once workers emerge from their pupae. Workers may vary just in size (monomorphism) or size and bodily proportions (allometry). An excellent example of the monomorphism is in bumblebees (Bombus spp.). Bumblebee workers display a large amount of body size variation which is normally distributed. The largest workers may be ten times the mass of the smallest workers. Worker size is correlated with several tasks: larger workers tend to forage, while smaller workers tend to perform brood care and nest thermoregulation. Size also affects task efficiency. Larger workers are better at learning, have better vision, carry more weight, and fly at a greater range of temperatures. However, smaller workers are more resistant to starvation. In other eusocial insects as well, worker size can determine what polymorphic role they become. For instance, larger workers in Myrmecocystus mexicanus (a North America species of honeypot ant) tend to become repletes, or workers so engorged with food that they become immobile and act a living food storage for the rest of the colonies.

In many ants and termites, on the other hand, workers vary in both size and bodily proportions, which have a bimodal distribution. This is present in approximately one in six ant genera. In most of these there are two developmentally distinct pathways, or castes, into which workers can develop. Typically members of the smaller caste are called minors and members of the larger caste are called majors or soldiers. There is often variation in size within each caste. The term soldiers may be apt, as in Cephalotes, but in many species members of the larger caste act primarily as foragers or food processors. In a few ant species, such as certain Pheidole species, there is a third caste, called supersoldiers.

== Temporal polyethism ==
Temporal polyethism is a mechanism of task allocation, and is ubiquitous among eusocial insect colonies. Tasks in a colony are allocated among workers based on their age. Newly emerged workers perform tasks within the nest, such as brood care and nest maintenance, and progress to tasks outside the nest, such as foraging, nest defense, and corpse removal as they age. In honeybees, the youngest workers exclusively clean cells, which is then followed by tasks related to brood care and nest maintenance from about 2–11 days of age. From 11– 20 days, they transition to receiving and storing food from foragers, and at about 20 days workers begin to forage. Similar temporal polyethism patterns can be seen in primitive species of wasps, such as Ropalidia marginata as well as the eusocial wasp Vespula germanica. Young workers feed larvae, and then transition to nest building tasks, followed by foraging. Many species of ants also display this pattern. This pattern is not rigid, though. Workers of certain ages have strong tendencies to perform certain tasks, but may perform other tasks if there is enough need. For instance, removing young workers from the nest will cause foragers, especially younger foragers, to revert to tasks such as caring for brood. These changes in task preference are caused by epigenetic changes over the life of the individual. Honeybee workers of different ages show substantial differences in DNA methylation, which causes differences in gene expression. Reverting foragers to nurses by removing younger workers causes changes in DNA methylation similar to younger workers. Temporal polyethism is not adaptive because of maximized efficiency; indeed older workers are actually more efficient at brood care than younger workers in some ant species. Rather it allows workers with the lowest remaining life expectancy to perform the most dangerous tasks. Older workers tend to perform riskier tasks, such as foraging, which has high risks of predation and parasitism, while younger workers perform less dangerous tasks, such as brood care. If workers experience injuries, which shortens their life expectancies, they will start foraging sooner than healthy workers of the same age.

== Response-Threshold Model ==
A dominant theory of explaining the self-organized division of labor in social insect societies such as honey bee colonies is the Response-Threshold Model. It predicts that individual worker bees have inherent thresholds to stimuli associated with different tasks. Individuals with the lowest thresholds will preferentially perform that task. Stimuli could include the "search time" that elapses while a foraging bee waits to unload her nectar and pollen to a receiver bee at the hive, the smell of diseased brood cells, or any other combination of environmental inputs that an individual worker bee encounters. The Response-Threshold Model only provides for effective task allocation in the honey bee colony if thresholds are varied among individual workers. This variation originates from the considerable genetic diversity among worker daughters of a colony due to the queen's multiple matings.

== Network representation of information flow and task allocation ==
To explain how colony-level complexity arises from the interactions of several autonomous individuals, a network-based approach has emerged as a promising area of social insect research. Social insect colonies can be viewed as a self-organized network, in which interacting elements (i.e. nodes) communicate with each other. As decentralized networks, colonies are capable of distributing information rapidly which facilitates robust responsiveness to their dynamic environments. The efficiency of information flow is critical for colony-level flexibility because worker behavior is not controlled by a centralized leader but rather is based on local information.

Social insect networks are often non-randomly distributed, wherein a few individuals act as 'hubs,' having disproportionately more connections to other nestmates than other workers in the colony. In harvester ants, the total interactions per ant during recruitment for outside work is right-skewed, meaning that some ants are more highly connected than others. Computer simulations of this particular interaction network demonstrated that inter-individual variation in connectivity patterns expedites information flow among nestmates.

Task allocation within a social insect colony can be modeled using a network-based approach, in which workers are represented by nodes, which are connected by edges that signify inter-node interactions. Workers performing a common task form highly connected clusters, with weaker links across tasks. These weaker, cross-task connections are important for allowing task-switching to occur between clusters. This approach is potentially problematic because connections between workers are not permanent, and some information is broadcast globally, e.g. through pheromones, and therefore does not rely on interaction networks. One alternative approach to avoid this pitfall is to treat tasks as nodes and workers as fluid connections.

To demonstrate how time and space constraints of individual-level interactions affect colony function, social insect network approaches can also incorporate spatiotemporal dynamics. These effects can impose upper bounds to information flow rate in the network. For example, the rate of information flow through Temnothorax rugatulus ant colonies is slower than would be predicted if time spent traveling and location within the nest were not considered. In Formica fusca L. ant colonies, a network analysis of spatial effects on feeding and the regulation of food storage revealed that food is distributed heterogeneously within colony, wherein heavily loaded workers are located centrally within the nest and those storing less food were located at the periphery.

Studies of inter-nest pheromone trail networks maintained by super-colonies of Argentine ants (Linepithema humile) have shown that different colonies establish networks with very similar topologies. Insights from these analyses revealed that these networks – which are used to guide workers transporting brood, workers and food between nests – are formed through a pruning process, in which individual ants initially create a complex network of trails, which are then refined to eliminate extraneous edges, resulting in a shorter, more efficient inter-nest network.

Long-term stability of interaction networks has been demonstrated in Odontomachus hastatus ants, in which initially highly connected ants remain highly connected over an extended time period. Conversely, Temnothorax rugatulus ant workers are not persistent in their interactive role, which might suggest that social organization is regulated differently among different eusocial species.

A network is pictorially represented as a graph, but can equivalently be represented as an adjacency list or adjacency matrix. Traditionally, workers are the nodes of the graph, but Fewell prefers to make the tasks the nodes, with workers as the links. O'Donnell has coined the term "worker connectivity" to stand for "communicative interactions that link a colony's workers in a social network and affect task performance". He has pointed out that connectivity provides three adaptive advantages compared to individual direct perception of needs:

1. It increases both the physical and temporal reach of information. With connectivity, information can travel farther and faster, and additionally can persist longer, including both direct persistence (i.e. through pheromones), memory effects, and by initiating a sequence of events.
2. It can help overcome task inertia and burnout, and push workers into performing hazardous tasks. For reasons of indirect fitness, this latter stimulus should not be necessary if all workers in the colony are highly related genetically, but that is not always the case.
3. Key individuals may possess superior knowledge, or have catalytic roles. Examples, respectively, are a sentry who has detected an intruder, or the colony queen.

O'Donnell provides a comprehensive survey, with examples, of factors that have a large bearing on worker connectivity. They include:

- graph degree
- size of the interacting group, especially if the network has a modular structure
- sender distribution (i.e. a small number of controllers vs. numerous senders)
- strength of the interaction effect, which includes strength of the signal sent, recipient sensitivity, and signal persistence (i.e. pheromone signal vs. sound waves)
- recipient memory, and its decay function
- socially-transmitted inhibitory signals, as not all interactions provide positive stimulus
- specificity of both the signal and recipient response
- signal and sensory modalities, and activity and interaction rates

== Task taxonomy and complexity ==
Anderson, Franks, and McShea have broken down insect tasks (and subtasks) into a hierarchical taxonomy; their focus is on task partitioning and its complexity implications. They classify tasks as individual, group, team, or partitioned; classification of a task depends on whether there are multiple vs. individual workers, whether there is division of labor, and whether subtasks are done concurrently or sequentially. Note that in their classification, in order for an action to be considered a task, it must contribute positively to inclusive fitness; if it must be combined with other actions to achieve that goal, it is considered to be a subtask. In their simple model, they award 1, 2, or 3 points to the different tasks and subtasks, depending on its above classification. Summing all tasks and subtasks point values down through all levels of nesting allows any task to be given a score that roughly ranks relative complexity of actions. See also the review of task partitioning by Ratnieks and Anderson.

== Note: model-building ==
All models are simplified abstractions of the real-life situation. There exists a basic tradeoff between model precision and parameter precision. A fixed amount of information collected, will, if split amongst the many parameters of an overly precise model, result in at least some of the parameters being represented by inadequate sample sizes. Because of the often limited quantities and limited precision of data from which to calculate parameters values in non-human behavior studies, such models should generally be kept simple. Therefore, we generally should not expect models for social insect task allocation or task partitioning to be as elaborate as human workflow ones, for example.

== Metrics for division of labor ==
With increased data, more elaborate metrics for division of labor within the colony become possible. Gorelick and Bertram survey the applicability of metrics taken from a wide range of other fields. They argue that a single output statistic is desirable, to permit comparisons across different population sizes and different numbers of tasks. But they also argue that the input to the function should be a matrix representation (of time spent by each individual on each task), in order to provide the function with better data. They conclude that "... normalized matrix-input generalizations of Shannon's and Simpson's index ... should be the indices of choice when one wants to simultaneously examine division of labor amongst all individuals in a population". Note that these indexes, used as metrics of biodiversity, now find a place measuring division of labor.

== See also ==
- Patterns of self-organization in ants
- Network theory
