= Patterns of self-organization in ants =

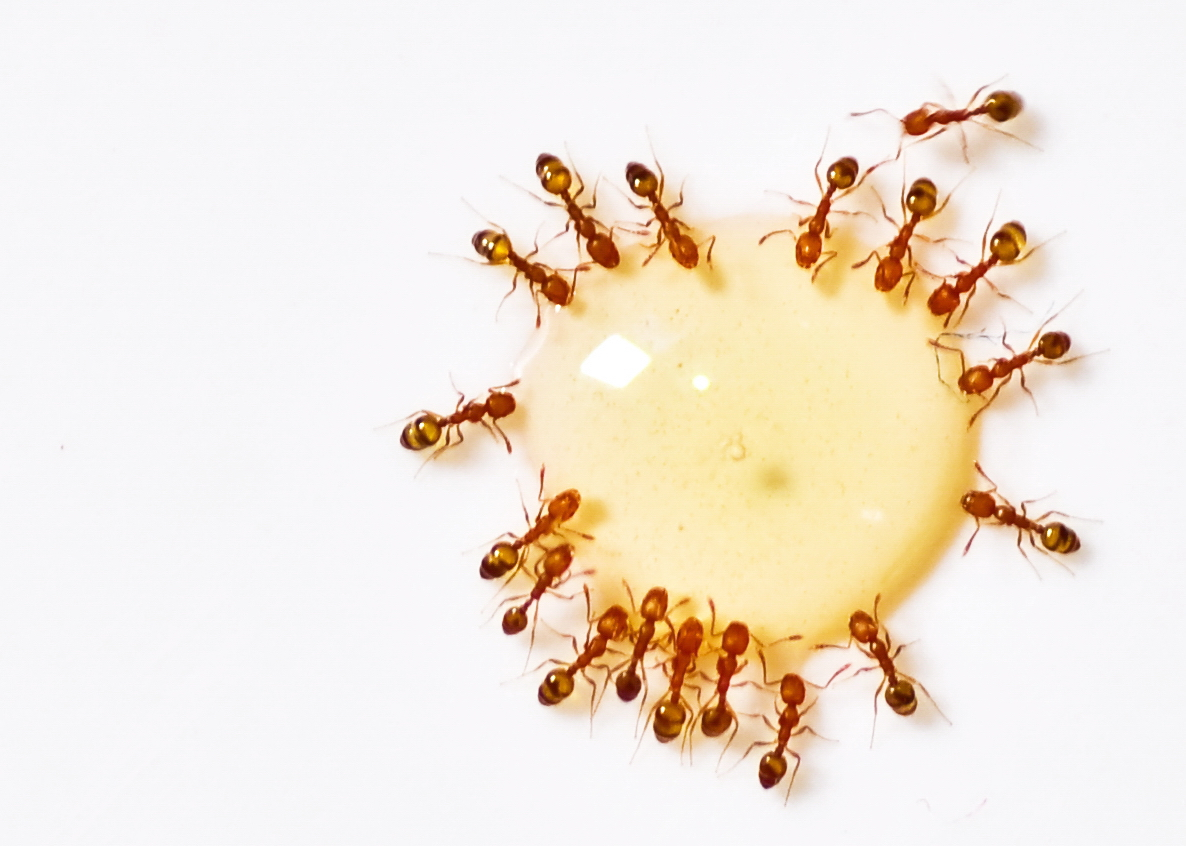
Ants around a drop of honey

Ants are simple animals and their behavioural repertory is limited to somewhere between ten and forty elementary behaviours. This is an attempt to explain the different patterns of self-organization in ants.

== Ants as complex systems ==
Ant colonies are self-organized systems: complex collective behaviors arise as the product of interactions between many individuals each following a simple set of rules, not via top-down instruction from elite individuals or the queen. No one worker has universal knowledge of the colony's needs; individual workers react only to their local environment. Because of this, ants are a popular source of inspiration for design in software engineering, robotics, industrial design, and other fields involving many simple parts working together to perform complex tasks.

The most popular current model of self-organization in ants and other social insects is the response threshold model. A threshold for a particular task is the amount of stimulus, such as a pheromone or interactions with other workers, necessary to cause the worker to perform the associated task. A higher threshold requires a stronger stimulus, and thus translates into less preference for performing a specific task. Different workers have different thresholds for different tasks, allowing certain workers to function as specialists that preferentially perform one or more tasks. Threshold levels can be affected by several factors: worker age, since workers frequently switch from within-nest work to outside-nest work with age; size, since larger workers often perform different tasks, such as defense or seed processing; caste; health, since injuries can encourage young workers to switch to outside-nest work earlier; or be randomly distributed. As demand for a task increases, so does the proportion of workers whose thresholds are met; as demand decreases, fewer workers' thresholds are met and fewer workers are allocated to that task. In this way, simple individual rules allow for the regulation of work on a large scale in diverse settings. This system can also evolve in response to different environments and life history strategies, leading to the immense variation observed in ants.

== Bifurcation ==
This is an instant transition of the whole system to a new stable pattern when a threshold is reached. Bifurcation is also known as multi-stability in which many stable states are possible.

Examples of pattern types:

1. Transition between disordered and ordered pattern
2. Transition from an even use of many food sources to one source.
3. Formation of branched nest galleries.
4. Group preference of one exit by escaping ants.
5. Chain formation of mutual leg grasping.

== Synchronization ==
Oscillating patterns of activity in which individuals at different activity levels stimulate one another emerging from mutual activation.

Examples of pattern types:

1. Short scale rhythms arising from mechanical activation from physical contact.
2. Long scale rhythms in which temporal changes in food needs and larvae stimulate changes in the reproductive cycle.

== Self-organized waves ==
Traveling waves of chemical concentration or mechanical deformation.

Examples of pattern types:

1. Alarm waves propagated by physical contact.
2. Rotating trails from spatial changes in food resources acting on trail laying activity.

== Self-organized criticality ==
Self-organized criticality is an abrupt disturbance in a system resulting from a buildup of events without external stimuli.

Examples of pattern types:

1. Abrupt changes in feeding activity.
2. Mechanical grasping of legs forming ant droplets.
