= Hyidiothrips =

Scientific classification
- Kingdom: Animalia
- Phylum: Arthropoda
- Class: Insecta
- Order: Thysanoptera
- Family: Phlaeothripidae
- Genus: Hyidiothrips; Hood, 1938

Genus of thrips

Hyidiothrips is a genus of thrips in the family Phlaeothripidae.

== Species ==
- Hyidiothrips atomarius
- Hyidiothrips brunneus
- Hyidiothrips guangdongensis
- Hyidiothrips hiromiae
- Hyidiothrips japonicus
- Hyidiothrips malayanus
- Hyidiothrips nanellus
- Hyidiothrips nirasawae
- Hyidiothrips sulawesicus
- Hyidiothrips tesselatus
