= Neohoodiella =

Scientific classification
- Kingdom: Animalia
- Phylum: Arthropoda
- Clade: Pancrustacea
- Class: Insecta
- Order: Thysanoptera
- Family: Phlaeothripidae
- Genus: Neohoodiella; Bournier, 1997

Genus of thrips

Neohoodiella is a genus of thrips in the family Phlaeothripidae, first described by Jean-Paul Bournier in 1997 from specimens collected in New Caledonia, but found also in Australia, in Queensland and in New South Wales.

There are two species: Neohoodiella grandsetis (found in New Caledonia), and Neohoodiella jennibeardae (found in Australia).
