= Torvothrips =

Scientific classification
- Kingdom: Animalia
- Phylum: Arthropoda
- Class: Insecta
- Order: Thysanoptera
- Family: Phlaeothripidae
- Subfamily: Phlaeothripinae
- Genus: Torvothrips; Johansen, 1977

Genus of thrips

Torvothrips is a genus of tube-tailed thrips in the family Phlaeothripidae. There are at least two described species in Torvothrips.

== Species ==
These two species belong to the genus Torvothrips:

- Torvothrips kosztarabi Johansen, 1980
- Torvothrips peuctraus Johansen
