= Proleeuwenia =

Proleeuwenia Temporal range: 37.2–33.9 Ma Eocene

Scientific classification
- Kingdom: Animalia
- Phylum: Arthropoda
- Class: Insecta
- Order: Thysanoptera
- Family: Phlaeothripidae
- Genus: †Proleeuwenia; Priesner, 1924

Genus of thrips

Proleeuwenia was a genus of thrips in the family Phlaeothripidae.

Fossils are only found in Baltic amber, (Judge Fritsch (Goldap) collection).

== Species ==
- †Proleeuwenia succini
