= Heligmothrips =

Scientific classification
- Kingdom: Animalia
- Phylum: Arthropoda
- Class: Insecta
- Order: Thysanoptera
- Family: Phlaeothripidae
- Genus: Heligmothrips; Mound, 1970

Genus of thrips

Heligmothrips is a genus of thrips in the family Phlaeothripidae.

== Species ==
- Heligmothrips brevidens
- Heligmothrips eiletus
- Heligmothrips erinaceus
- Heligmothrips frickeri
- Heligmothrips gracilior
- Heligmothrips reticulaticeps
