= Temenothrips =

Scientific classification
- Kingdom: Animalia
- Phylum: Arthropoda
- Class: Insecta
- Order: Thysanoptera
- Family: Phlaeothripidae
- Genus: Temenothrips; Okajima & Urushihara, 1992

Genus of thrips

Tarassothrips is a genus of thrips in the family Phlaeothripidae.

== Species ==
- Temenothrips flavillus
- Temenothrips nigricans
- Temenothrips oblongus
