= Araeothrips =

Scientific classification
- Kingdom: Animalia
- Phylum: Arthropoda
- Class: Insecta
- Order: Thysanoptera
- Family: Phlaeothripidae
- Genus: Araeothrips; Ananthakrishnan, 1976

Genus of thrips

Araeothrips is a genus of thrips in the family Phlaeothripidae.

== Species ==
- Araeothrips duibongensis
- Araeothrips longisetis
- Araeothrips vamana
