= Mimothrips =

Scientific classification
- Kingdom: Animalia
- Phylum: Arthropoda
- Class: Insecta
- Order: Thysanoptera
- Family: Phlaeothripidae
- Genus: Mimothrips (Priesner, 1949)

Genus of thrips

Mimothrips is a genus of thrips in the family Phlaeothripidae.

== Species ==
- Mimothrips hargreavesi
- Mimothrips longicornis
- Mimothrips orientalis
