= Idiothrips =

Scientific classification
- Kingdom: Animalia
- Phylum: Arthropoda
- Class: Insecta
- Order: Thysanoptera
- Family: Phlaeothripidae
- Genus: Idiothrips; Faure, 1933

Genus of thrips

Idiothrips is a genus of thrips in the family Phlaeothripidae.

== Species ==
- Idiothrips bellus
- Idiothrips maghrebinus
