= Neodixothrips =

Scientific classification
- Kingdom: Animalia
- Phylum: Arthropoda
- Class: Insecta
- Order: Thysanoptera
- Family: Phlaeothripidae
- Genus: Neodixothrips; Sen & Muraleedharan, 1976

Genus of thrips

Neodixothrips is a genus of thrips in the family Phlaeothripidae.

== Species ==
- Neodixothrips assamensis
