= Mutothrips =

Scientific classification
- Kingdom: Animalia
- Phylum: Arthropoda
- Class: Insecta
- Order: Thysanoptera
- Family: Phlaeothripidae
- Genus: Mutothrips; Ananthakrishnan & Swaminathan, 1980

Genus of thrips

Mutothrips is a genus of thrips in the family Phlaeothripidae.

== Species ==
- Mutothrips validus
