= Pnigmothrips =

Scientific classification
- Kingdom: Animalia
- Phylum: Arthropoda
- Class: Insecta
- Order: Thysanoptera
- Family: Phlaeothripidae
- Genus: Pnigmothrips; Priesner, 1953

Genus of thrips

Pnigmothrips is a genus of thrips in the family Phlaeothripidae.

== Species ==
- Pnigmothrips medanensis
