= Aesthetothrips =

Scientific classification
- Kingdom: Animalia
- Phylum: Arthropoda
- Class: Insecta
- Order: Thysanoptera
- Family: Phlaeothripidae
- Genus: Aesthetothrips; Hood, 1954

Genus of thrips

Aesthetothrips is a genus of thrips in the family Phlaeothripidae.

== Species ==
- Aesthetothrips tucuche
