= Agnostochthona =

Scientific classification
- Kingdom: Animalia
- Phylum: Arthropoda
- Class: Insecta
- Order: Thysanoptera
- Family: Phlaeothripidae
- Genus: Agnostochthona; Kirkaldy, 1907

Genus of thrips

Agnostochthona is a genus of thrips in the family Phlaeothripidae.

== Species ==
- Agnostochthona alienigera
