= Cecidothrips =

Scientific classification
- Kingdom: Animalia
- Phylum: Arthropoda
- Class: Insecta
- Order: Thysanoptera
- Family: Phlaeothripidae
- Genus: Cecidothrips; Kieffer, 1908

Genus of thrips

Cecidothrips is a genus of thrips in the family Phlaeothripidae.

== Species ==
- Cecidothrips bursarum
