= Jacobothrips =

Scientific classification
- Kingdom: Animalia
- Phylum: Arthropoda
- Class: Insecta
- Order: Thysanoptera
- Family: Phlaeothripidae
- Genus: Jacobothrips zur Strassen, 1966

Genus of thrips

Jacobothrips is a genus of thrips in the family Phlaeothripidae.

== Species ==
- Jacobothrips carolinae
