= Sinuothrips =

Scientific classification
- Kingdom: Animalia
- Phylum: Arthropoda
- Class: Insecta
- Order: Thysanoptera
- Family: Phlaeothripidae
- Genus: Sinuothrips; Collins, 2000

Genus of thrips

Sinuothrips is a genus of thrips in the family Phlaeothripidae.

== Species ==
- Sinuothrips hasta
