= Philothrips =

Scientific classification
- Kingdom: Animalia
- Phylum: Arthropoda
- Class: Insecta
- Order: Thysanoptera
- Family: Phlaeothripidae
- Genus: Philothrips (Priesner, 1939)

Genus of thrips

Philothrips is a monotypic genus of thrips in the family Phlaeothripidae.

== Species ==
- Philothrips socius
