= Corn salad necrosis virus =

Virus classification
- (unranked): Virus
- Realm: Riboviria
- Kingdom: Orthornavirae
- Phylum: Kitrinoviricota
- Class: Tolucaviricetes
- Order: Tolivirales
- Family: Tombusviridae
- Genus: Alphanecrovirus
- Virus: Corn salad necrosis virus

Species of virus

The corn salad necrosis virus is a virus infecting corn salad. It is related to tobacco necrosis virus and is highly similar to TNVA and Satellite tobacco necrosis virus.

Even though corn salad necrosis virus and tobacco necrosis virus are similar, only corn salad necrosis virus can systemically infect corn salad.

Infection remains low at only 2%, or 20 plants per square metre.

Viral particles of the virus are spherical and 30 nanometre in diameter.
