= Turnip crinkle virus (TCV) hairpin H4 =

In molecular biology, Turnip crinkle virus (TCV) hairpin H4 is an RNA hairpin found at the 3' end of the Turnip crinkle virus (TCV) genome.

The 3' end of the TCV genome contains the hairpin H4, a T-shaped structure (TSS), which contains hairpins 4a, 4b and hairpin 5 and a promoter hairpin. H4 enhances transcription and translation of the viral genome.
