= Bean leafroll virus =

Virus classification
- (unranked): Virus
- Realm: Riboviria
- Kingdom: Orthornavirae
- Phylum: Kitrinoviricota
- Class: Tolucaviricetes
- Order: Tolivirales
- Family: Tombusviridae
- Genus: Luteovirus
- Species: Luteovirus phaseoli

Synonyms
- alfalfa Michigan virus legume yellows virus pea leaf roll virus pea tip yellowing virus pea top yellows virus

Species of virus

Bean leafroll virus (BLRV) is a plant pathogenic virus of the genus Luteovirus.
