= Flower thrips =

Flower thrips can be agricultural pests in either two species of thrips in the genus Frankliniella:

- F. tritici, Eastern flower thrips
- F. occidentalis, Western flower thrips
