= Maize white line mosaic virus =

Virus classification
- (unranked): Virus
- Realm: Riboviria
- Kingdom: Orthornavirae
- Phylum: Kitrinoviricota
- Class: Tolucaviricetes
- Order: Tolivirales
- Family: Tombusviridae
- Genus: Aureusvirus
- Species: Aureusvirus zeae

Synonyms
- maize dwarf ringspot virus possibly maize white line virus

Species of virus

Maize white line mosaic virus (MWLMV) is a pathogenic plant virus.
