= Soybean dwarf virus =

Virus classification
- (unranked): Virus
- Realm: Riboviria
- Kingdom: Orthornavirae
- Phylum: Kitrinoviricota
- Class: Tolucaviricetes
- Order: Tolivirales
- Family: Tombusviridae
- Genus: Luteovirus
- Species: Luteovirus glycinis

Synonyms
- Subterranean clover red leaf virus

Species of virus

Soybean dwarf virus (SbDV) is a pathogenic plant virus which infects soybeans.

== See also ==
- List of soybean diseases
