= Narcissus tip necrosis virus =

Virus classification
- (unranked): Virus
- Realm: Riboviria
- Kingdom: Orthornavirae
- Phylum: Kitrinoviricota
- Class: Tolucaviricetes
- Order: Tolivirales
- Family: Tombusviridae
- Virus: Narcissus tip necrosis virus

Species of virus

Narcissus tip necrosis virus (NTNV) is a plant pathogenic virus of the family Tombusviridae, which infects plants of the genus Narcissus, the only known host.

== Description ==
NTNV disease appears after flowering with large necrotic lesions which appear first near the leaf tips ('tip necrosis').

== Taxonomy ==
Narcissus tip necrosis virus was isolated in 1972. At the 1987 ICTV meeting, that proposed the genus Carmovirus, Narcissus tip necrosis virus was listed as a 'tentative' member but as of the 2013 release it had not been officially accepted. Note that the ICTV does not track tentative members, so there are no further records in their databases, though NTNV was still listed as tentative in the Ninth Report (2009).
