= Carnation mottle virus =

Virus classification
- (unranked): Virus
- Realm: Riboviria
- Kingdom: Orthornavirae
- Phylum: Kitrinoviricota
- Class: Tolucaviricetes
- Order: Tolivirales
- Family: Tombusviridae
- Genus: Alphacarmovirus
- Species: Carnation mottle virus

Species of virus

Carnation mottle virus (CarMV) is a plant pathogenic virus of the family Tombusviridae.
