= Aeolothrips collaris =

Scientific classification
- Kingdom: Animalia
- Phylum: Arthropoda
- Clade: Pancrustacea
- Class: Insecta
- Order: Thysanoptera
- Family: Aeolothripidae
- Genus: Aeolothrips
- Species: A. collaris

Binomial name
- Aeolothrips collaris Priesner, 1919

Species of thrip

Aeolothrips collaris is a species of predatory thrips in the family Aeolothripidae. It is found in Africa, Europe and Northern Asia (excluding China), and North America.
