= Red clover (disambiguation) =

Red clover is a species of clover native to Europe, Western Asia, and northwest Africa.

Red clover may also refer to:

- Red clover vein mosaic virus, a plant pathogenic virus.
- Red clover necrotic mosaic virus translation enhancer elements
- Red Clover Creek, a stream in Plumas County, California
- Red clover diseases, a list of diseases that affect red clover
- Red Clover (film), a 2012 horror film starring Billy Zane
