= Turnip crinkle virus =

Virus classification
- (unranked): Virus
- Realm: Riboviria
- Kingdom: Orthornavirae
- Phylum: Kitrinoviricota
- Class: Tolucaviricetes
- Order: Tolivirales
- Family: Tombusviridae
- Genus: Betacarmovirus
- Species: Betacarmovirus brassicae

Species of virus

Turnip crinkle virus (TCV) is a plant pathogenic virus of the family Tombusviridae. It was first isolated from turnips (Brassica campestris ssp. rapa).

== Structure ==
TCV is a small (4054 nucleotides), single-stranded, positive-sense RNA virus (viral RNA is in the same orientation as mRNA). It has been shown to infect various types of plant species, including the common plant models Arabidopsis thaliana and Nicotiana benthamiana. Its gRNA encodes for five proteins: p28 and p88 (replication), p8 and p9 (movement) and CP (coat protein or encapsidation). The structure of the virus was determined to 3.2 Ångstrom resolution using x-ray crystallography in 1986. It is structurally quite similar to the tomato bushy stunt virus.

A number of non-coding RNA elements have been characterised in the TCV genome; examples are hairpin 5 and the core promoter.

== Replication ==
Replication of the viral RNA begins with the migration of p28 to the mitochondrial membrane. p28 migrates to and invaginates the outer mitochondrial membrane; several p88 molecules are brought the newly formed vesicles. The viral RNA binds to the p28 bound to the membrane and the RNA dependent RNA polymerase, or p88, initiates replication of the positive strand RNA to produce a minus strand intermediate. The negative-strand intermediate is used as a template to produce progeny positive strand RNA. The coat proteins p8, p9, and p38, are involved in movement in the plant.

== Satellite viruses ==
Small, helper viruses known as satellite RNA have been found to co-infect plants only in the presence of TCV.

== Arabidopsis thaliana resistance to TCV ==
Much research has been done on TCV and the way that it affects Arabidopsis thaliana (thale cress). Arabidopsis tends to be very susceptible to TCV, along with several other species other than turnips. It is used for research as its susceptibility and simplicity make it a good model organism. Research has shown that only satellite C produces any symptoms in Arabidopsis. The same research has shown that how much the plant is affected by the Virus depends largely on the ecotype, as the Dijon-ecotype of Arabidopsis thaliana seems to be far more susceptible than other types. It has also been shown that light affects the resistance of Arabidopsis to TCV, and that inoculations proved to be ineffective without the plant being exposed to light. Research has also been done on what part of TCV is recognized by the strains of Arabidopsis that are resistant to TCV, and it appears to be the Amino terminus of the coat protein. This was determined by using Viruses both with and without the Amino terminus.
