= MiR403 microRNA precursor family =

Name of an RNA molecule

miR403

Identifiers
- Symbol: miR403
- Rfam: RF00842
- miRBase family: MIPF0000290

Other data
- RNA type: microRNA
- Domain: Viridiplantae
- PDB structures: PDBe

In molecular biology, miR403 is a conserved plant microRNA that regulates gene expression through sequence-directed cleavage or translational repression of target mRNAs. miR403 has been identified in several plant species including Arabidopsis thaliana and other flowering plants.

One of the best-characterized targets of miR403 is the gene encoding Argonaute 2 (AGO2), a core component of the RNA interference pathway. In Arabidopsis, miR403-mediated regulation of AGO2 contributes to the control of antiviral defense responses. Under normal conditions, AGO1-associated miR403 represses AGO2 expression, but during infection by viruses such as turnip crinkle virus or cucumber mosaic virus, this regulatory balance shifts and AGO2 accumulates to help limit virus replication.

This regulatory interaction links miR403 to the broader small RNA–mediated defense system in plants, in which multiple Argonaute proteins contribute to antiviral RNA silencing.

== See also ==
- MicroRNA
