= Zeavirus =

Virus classification
- (unranked): Virus
- Realm: Riboviria
- Kingdom: Orthornavirae
- Phylum: Kitrinoviricota
- Class: Tolucaviricetes
- Order: Tolivirales
- Family: Tombusviridae
- Subfamily: Procedovirinae
- Genus: Zeavirus

Genus of viruses

Zeavirus is a genus of viruses, in the family Tombusviridae. Monocots plants serve as natural hosts. There is only one species in this genus: Maize necrotic streak virus (Zeavirus zeae).

== Structure ==
Viruses in Zeavirus are non-enveloped, with icosahedral and spherical geometries, and T=3 symmetry. The diameter is around 28-34 nm. Genomes are linear and non-segmented, around 4kb in length.

| Genus | Structure | Symmetry | Capsid | Genomic arrangement | Genomic segmentation |
|---|---|---|---|---|---|
| Zeavirus | Icosahedral | T=3 | Non-enveloped | Linear | Monopartite |

== Life cycle ==
Viral replication is cytoplasmic. Entry into the host cell is achieved by penetration into the host cell. Replication follows the positive stranded RNA virus replication model. Positive stranded RNA virus transcription, using the premature termination model of subgenomic RNA transcription is the method of transcription. The virus exits the host cell by tubule-guided viral movement. Monocot plants serve as the natural host.

| Genus | Host details | Tissue tropism | Entry details | Release details | Replication site | Assembly site | Transmission |
|---|---|---|---|---|---|---|---|
| Zeavirus | Plants | None | Viral movement; mechanical inoculation | Viral movement | Cytoplasm | Cytoplasm | Mechanical: contact; seed |
