= Maize lethal necrosis disease =

Viral infection predominantly affecting maize

Maize lethal necrosis disease (MLN disease, MLND, corn lethal necrosis) is a viral disease affecting maize (corn) predominantly in East Africa, Southeast Asia and South America, which was recognised in 2010. It is caused by simultaneous infection with two viruses, MCMoV and any of several Potyviridae.

== Etiology ==
MLND is caused by simultaneous infection with two viruses, maize chlorotic mottle virus (MCMoV) of the Tombusviridae family and any of several viruses from the Potyviridae group: the Potyviruses maize dwarf mosaic virus (MDMV), sugarcane mosaic virus (SCMV), Johnsongrass mosaic virus (JGMV), or the Tritimovirus wheat streak mosaic virus (WSMV). JGMV is found to be a contributor - and the other viruses are briefly reviewed and bibliography provided - by Stewart et al. 2017.

== Transmission ==
Spread of the disease is driven by expansion in the range of maize chlorotic mottle virus, which is thought to be transmitted by species of thrips including maize thrips (Frankliniella williamsi) and possibly western flower thrips (Frankliniella occidentalis). The potyviruses involved in MLND are transmitted by several species of aphids and, in the case of the wheat streak mosaic virus, wheat curl mite. MLN is associated with the presence of maize thrips and the growth of several crops of maize annually.

== Epidemiology ==
SCMV is the most common second contributor in East Africa, but also JGMV and MDMV. This is the location of Stewart et al. 2017's discovery that JGMV contributes – they also review and provide a bibliography as to SCMV and MDMV.

== Economic impact ==
In late 2014, it was reported that MLND could cut Kenya's maize production by as much as 30%. In early March 2015, the middle of the rainy season, losses were estimated at 10%.

== Symptoms ==
Leaves of infected plants become yellow from the tip and margins to the centre. Older leaves (bottom of plant) remain green. Ears and leaves dry up and sometimes look like a mature plant. The whole plant dies and maize cobs remain without kernels. MLND symptoms can be confused with symptoms of nutrient deficiency but plants affected by MLND appear only in some areas and are scattered or clumped in a field while nutrient deficiency appears on many plants over large areas of a field.

In the early stages, MLND causes long yellow stripes on leaves. Unlike maize streak virus disease though, the streaks of MLND are wider. As the disease advances, the maize leaves become yellow and dry out from the outside edges towards the midrib. MLND can also cause dwarfing and premature aging of the plants. Finally, the entire plant dries out and dies. Dead plants can then be seen scattered across the field among healthy looking plants. Late infected plants don't tassel and tend to produce poor grain filled cobs.

MLND presence in a field is also found by Parsons and Munkvold 2010 to increase susceptibility to ear rot conditions. This may be due to earlier stages of thrips feeding on earlier stages of kernels.

== Management ==
Partners of the CABI-led programme, Plantwise recommend where possible using certified, disease-free seed. They also recommend not moving infected maize plants and seeds to disease-free areas. Plantwise and partners also recommend rotating with non-cereal crops (e.g. beans, faba bean, chickpea etc.) for at least 2–3 years/seasons and removing alternate hosts including, sorghum, grasses, millet, wheat, oats, sudan grass.

The Ministry of Agriculture and Natural Resources of Ethiopia recommend uprooting and burning of diseased plants.

Another method of prevention is to leave land fallow for 2 months especially where maize is produced using irrigation. It is also recommended to plough and expose soil to sunlight for at least 2 months.

MLN resistance is an important trait to maize breeders. Forward genetics is increasingly being used.

== Sources ==
This article incorporates text from a free content work. Licensed under CC-BY-SA (license statement/permission). Text taken from Plantwise Factsheets for Farmers: Control vectors of Maize Lethal Necrotic Disease, Joyce G. Kessy, CABI.

This article incorporates text from a free content work. Licensed under CC-BY-SA (license statement/permission). Text taken from Plantwise Factsheet for Farmers: Prevention and detection of Maize Lethal Necrosis Disease, Hiwot Lemma, Daniel W. Michael, Mhreteab Tsegay, CABI.

This article incorporates text from a free content work. Licensed under CC-BY-SA (license statement/permission). Text taken from PMDG: Maize Lethal Necrosis Disease (MLND) (Ethiopia), Kassahun Sedessa (EIAR), Mebrahtom G/kidan (TBoARD), Habtie Abate (S/Gondar Agri Dept, Amhara), CABI.

This article incorporates text from a free content work. Licensed under CC-BY-SA (license statement/permission). Text taken from PMDG: Maize lethal necrosis disease in maize (Zambia), Mathews Matimelo (ZARI), CABI.
