= PMV =

PMV may refer to:

- Panicum mosaic virus, a plant virus known for infecting St. Augustine Grass
- Paramyxoviridae, or paramyxovirus, a family of viruses found in animals
- Parcels and Miscellaneous Van, an item of railway rolling stock
- Participatiemaatschappij Vlaanderen, an independent organization of the Flemish government
- Personal mobility vehicle
- Port Metro Vancouver, a corporation established by the Canadian government for managing port use and shipping in the Metro Vancouver area
- Bushmaster Protected Mobility Vehicle, an Australian armored vehicle
- Del Caribe "Santiago Mariño" International Airport, IATA code PMV
- Predicted Mean Vote, a model for measuring thermal comfort
- Pony music video, a My Little Pony equivalent of an anime music video (AMV)
