= Impact for Africa S.p.A. =

Impact investment company

- Industry: Agriculture; Post-Harvest Processing
- Founded: 2022 in Turin, Italy
- Founder: Luca Coltro; Emmanuel el-Khoury
- Website: impact4africa.com

Impact For Africa S.p.A. (IFA) is an impact investment company which focuses on developing the agricultural value chain in Rwanda and Namibia investing in regenerative agriculture and agro processing. IFA has been honored at the Africa Impact Investments Awards, 2nd Place in the Project Developer of the Year category and 2nd Place in the Asset Owner of the Year category.

IFA has developed the first industria avocado oil processing plant in Rwanda in partnership with Smallholder Resilience Fund and OneAcreFund and it has initiated the first project of regenerative agriculture in Namibia in collaboration with the Namibian Correntional Services and the UN World Food Programme.
