= Aeolothrips kuwanaii =

Scientific classification
- Kingdom: Animalia
- Phylum: Arthropoda
- Clade: Pancrustacea
- Class: Insecta
- Order: Thysanoptera
- Family: Aeolothripidae
- Genus: Aeolothrips
- Species: A. kuwanaii

Binomial name
- Aeolothrips kuwanaii Moulton, 1907

Species of thrip

Aeolothrips kuwanaii is a species of predatory thrips in the family Aeolothripidae. It is found in North America.
