= Panicovirus =

Virus classification
- (unranked): Virus
- Realm: Riboviria
- Kingdom: Orthornavirae
- Phylum: Kitrinoviricota
- Class: Tolucaviricetes
- Order: Tolivirales
- Family: Tombusviridae
- Subfamily: Procedovirinae
- Genus: Panicovirus

Genus of viruses

Panicovirus is a genus of viruses, in the family Tombusviridae. Panicae serve as natural hosts. There are three species in this genus. Diseases associated with this genus include: systemic mosaic.

== Taxonomy ==
The genus contains the following species, listed by scientific name and followed by their common names:

- Panicovirus dactylis, Cocksfoot mild mosaic virus
- Panicovirus panici, Panicum mosaic virus
- Panicovirus paspali, Thin paspalum asymptomatic virus

== Structure ==
Viruses in Panicovirus are non-enveloped, with icosahedral and spherical geometries, and T=3 symmetry. The diameter is around 28-34 nm. Genomes are linear, around 4-5.4kb in length.

Genus	Structure	Symmetry	Capsid	Genomic arrangement	Genomic segmentation
Panicovirus	Icosahedral	T=3	Non-enveloped	Linear	Monopartite

== Life cycle ==
Viral replication is cytoplasmic. Entry into the host cell is achieved by penetration into the host cell. Replication follows the positive stranded RNA virus replication model. Positive stranded RNA virus transcription, using the premature termination model of subgenomic RNA transcription is the method of transcription. Translation takes place by suppression of termination. The virus exits the host cell by tubule-guided viral movement. Panicae serve as the natural host. Transmission routes are mechanical, seed borne, and contact.

Genus	Host details	Tissue tropism	Entry details	Release details	Replication site	Assembly site	Transmission
Panicovirus	Plants: panicae	None	Viral movement; mechanical inoculation	Viral movement	Cytoplasm	Cytoplasm	Mechanical: contact; seed
