= Macrolophus caliginosus =

Scientific classification
- Kingdom: Animalia
- Phylum: Arthropoda
- Clade: Pancrustacea
- Class: Insecta
- Order: Hemiptera
- Suborder: Heteroptera
- Family: Miridae
- Genus: Macrolophus
- Species: M. caliginosus

Binomial name
- Macrolophus caliginosus Wagner, 1951

Species of true bug

Macrolophus caliginosus is a species of true bug in the family Miridae. It is omnivorous and both preys on insects and feeds on plant tissues. It is used in Europe in the biological control of whitefly in tomatoes grown under glass.

== Description ==
Macrolophus caliginosus is a slender pale-green insect some 2.9 to 3.6 millimetres (0.11 to 0.14 in) in length. Its eyes are red, its antennae are green with a black base and its legs are long, enabling it to move rapidly. The nymphs are yellowish-green.

== Ecology ==
The eggs of M. caliginosus take about eleven days to hatch at 25 °C (77 °F) and thirty-seven days at 15 °C (59 °F). The nymphs pass through five stages, completing their development in about nineteen days at 25 °C (77 °F). They and the adults are inconspicuous as they keep to the underside of leaves. The adult female may live for about forty days, during which time she will lay between one hundred and two hundred and fifty eggs, the number depending on the temperature and the availability of prey.

The preferred prey of M. caliginosus is whitefly but it also feeds on aphids, mites and the eggs of moths. An adult can consume upward of thirty whitefly eggs each day. When offered the greenhouse whitefly (Trialeurodes vaporariorum) and the silverleaf whitefly (Bemisia tabaci) it showed a preference for the former. If the available prey consisted primarily of the silverleaf whitefly (>75%), its preference was for the later stage nymphs of that species rather than any other stage.

== Use in biological control ==
Macrolophus caliginosus is used in Europe in the biological control of whitefly in tomato crops in greenhouses. It can survive for some time on its host plants in the absence of insect prey, can feed on pests other than whitefly, and has the additional advantage of being able to move freely from plant to plant. Due to a taxonomic revision, the species used in biocontrol is now properly identified as Macrolophus pygmaeus. Following its success in Europe, North American growers hoped to import it for biological control. However, regulatory authorities are reluctant to issue import permits for non-native generalist predators because of the possibility of them escaping into the wider environment with unintended consequences. So a search was undertaken in North America for an indigenous natural enemy for use in greenhouses there, and the mirid Dicyphus hesperus was found suitable to fulfil the role.

In the Mediterranean area, another mirid bug, Dicyphus tamaninii, occurs naturally and often spontaneously takes up residence in greenhouses growing tomatoes. Experiments were undertaken to establish how this and M. caliginosus interact with each other and what level of control of whitefly is established when they are both present in a crop. It was found that there was little competition between either the adults or the nymphs and that they did not prey on each other. When used alone, D tamaninii was more effective than M. caliginosus in reducing whitefly populations. A combination was as effective as either used separately.
