= Macanavirus =

Virus classification
- (unranked): Virus
- Realm: Riboviria
- Kingdom: Orthornavirae
- Phylum: Kitrinoviricota
- Class: Tolucaviricetes
- Order: Tolivirales
- Family: Tombusviridae
- Subfamily: Procedovirinae
- Genus: Macanavirus

Genus of viruses

Macanavirus is a genus of viruses, in the family Tombusviridae. Plants serve as natural hosts. There is only one species in this genus: Furcraea necrotic streak virus (Macanavirus furcraeae). Diseases associated with this genus include: macana disease.

== Structure ==
Viruses in Macanavirus are non-enveloped, with icosahedral and spherical geometries, and T=3 symmetry. The diameter is around 28 nm. Genomes are linear, around 4kb in length.

Genus	Structure	Symmetry	Capsid	Genomic arrangement	Genomic segmentation
Macanavirus	Icosahedral	T=3	Non-enveloped	Linear	Monopartite

== Life cycle ==
Viral replication is cytoplasmic. Entry into the host cell is achieved by penetration into the host cell. Replication follows the positive stranded RNA virus replication model. Positive stranded RNA virus transcription, using the premature termination model of subgenomic RNA transcription is the method of transcription. The virus exits the host cell by tubule-guided viral movement. Plants serve as the natural host.

Genus	Host details	Tissue tropism	Entry details	Release details	Replication site	Assembly site	Transmission
Macanavirus	Plants	None	Viral movement; mechanical inoculation	Viral movement	Cytoplasm	Cytoplasm	Mechanical: contact; seed
