= Panicum mosaic virus =

Virus classification
- (unranked): Virus
- Realm: Riboviria
- Kingdom: Orthornavirae
- Phylum: Kitrinoviricota
- Class: Tolucaviricetes
- Order: Tolivirales
- Family: Tombusviridae
- Genus: Panicovirus
- Species: Panicovirus panici

Species of plant virus, affects grasses

Panicum mosaic virus (PMV) is a positive-sense single-stranded RNA viral pathogen that infects plant species in the panicoid tribe of the grass family, Poaceae. The pathogen was first identified in Kansas in 1953 and most commonly causes disease on select cultivars of turf grass, switchgrass, and millet. The disease most commonly associated with the panicum mosaic virus pathogen is St. Augustine Decline Syndrome, which infects species of turf grass and causes chlorotic mottling. In addition to St. Augustine Decline, panicum mosaic virus is responsible for chlorotic streaking and mild green mosaicking in select cultivars of switchgrass and millet.

== History ==
PMV was first observed in Kansas in 1953. It was originally noted to infect switchgrass (Panicum virgatum), and was observed infecting St. Augustine grass (Stenotaphrum secundatum) in Texas in 1966. The strain specific to St. Augustine grass has since been observed in Arkansas, Louisiana, Mississippi and South Carolina in the United States, as well as in Mexico. Other strains have been identified infecting centipedegrass (Eremochloa ophiuroides). Foxtail millet (Setaria italica), white proso millet (Panicum miliaceum) and pearl millet (Pennisetum glaucum) have also been used to propagate PMV and panicum mosaic satellite virus (SPMV), and mechanical transmission can occur to maize and some cultivars of common wheat (Triticum aestivum).

== Classification ==
Panicum mosaic virus is assigned to the genus Panicovirus, a member of the plant virus family Tombusviridae. Members of Tombusviridae are transmitted as positive sense single-stranded non-enveloped RNA viruses, with an icosahedral capsid. PMV itself has a genome of 4,326 nucleotides, encapsulated into 30-nm particles by a capsid protein of 26 kDa. PMV was placed in the genus Panicovirus because of its limited monocot host range and lack of an additional 5'-ORF. PMV is serologically related to Molina streak virus and Maize mild mottle virus.

== Satellite panicum mosaic virus ==
There exists a satellite virus to panicum mosaic virus. Although little is known about the satellite panicum mosaic virus, the pathogen is believed to play a role in the infection process because when combined with panicum mosaic virus, the satellite virus causes symptoms to appear earlier in the growing season and results in a more severe infection. Because of the change in disease virulence to the main viral pathogen, panicum mosaic virus and satellite panicum mosaic virus are believed to cause synergistic effects to their hosts. Satellite panicum mosaic virus cannot produce its own replication nor movement proteins, thus it depends entirely on panicum mosaic virus for replication and systemic movement in the host plant.

== Pathogenesis and disease characteristics ==
Panicum mosaic virus is a plant disease that infects monocots by invading through mechanical wounds. Because panicum mosaic virus pathogen cannot create its own wound in a host plant, the pathogen must survive until a wound is formed by living epiphytically on its future host or in plant debris. The virus can live up to nine years in infected plant debris. The virus is moved around the environment by wind, rain, and cultural practices such as plowing and mowing. Once the virus has successfully invaded the plant, panicum mosaic virions spread through the plant by producing three proteins (p8, p6.6, and p15) as part of their capsids. The incubation period of panicum mosaic virus is fastest in warm conditions, around 29 to 35 degrees Celsius, and can take as few as 7–18 days.

In regard to pathogen composition, there are two characteristic components of panicum mosaic and its related panicum satellite mosaic viruses. One characteristic of the disease is a 42S component which is isometric shaped, 17 nm in diameter, and has not been shown to be infectious by itself. The second characteristic component of panicum mosaic virus is the 109S component which is approximately 30 nm in diameter, also isometric shaped, and has been shown to be infectious. From replication testing, it is believed the 109S component is the panicum mosaic pathogen and the 42S component of the pathogen is the panicum satellite virus because the 109S component replicates independently while 42S cannot replicate without the presence of the 109S component.

== Hosts and symptoms ==
=== St. Augustine grass ===
Symptoms of St. Augustine Decline Syndrome on St. Augustine grass (Stenotaphrum secundatum) are mild green mosaics in addition to mottling and streaking of leaves. In extreme cases, a turf grass crop may experience chlorosis if the disease affects susceptible plants. The disease is spread only through mechanical vectors, such as mowing. At this time, the only method of control for panicum mosaic virus is planting resistant cultivars. In turf grass, the disease is geographically centered around the southcentral and southeastern United States, due to the high prevalence of non-resistant turf species.

=== Millet ===
Symptoms of panicum mosaic virus on millet—without its satellite virus—are slight chlorosis and mild stunting. The synergistic effect of panicum mosaic virus and satellite panicum mosaic virus on millet cultivars is rapidly developed chlorotic streaking within several days of inoculating plants. The long-term effects of combined panicum mosaic and satellite panicum mosaic viruses on millet are severe leaf mosaicking, stunting, and failure to set seed.

=== Switchgrass ===
Switchgrass is a native prairie grass that started to be bred for erosion control and forage around a century ago. In the 1980s, switchgrass began to be cultivated for biofuels. Similar to its symptoms on millet and turf grass, panicum mosaic virus causes switchgrass to have chlorotic mottling and stunting.

== Management ==
=== St. Augustine decline in turf grass ===
The main method of controlling St. Augustine Decline Syndrome is breeding resistant varieties. This method of resistance breeding has been successful in turf grass because it has led to the production of two resistant cultivars of St. Augustine grass, FA-108 and FA-2002 (nicknamed 'Raleigh', and 'Seville'). Aside from resistance genes, another option of managing St. Augustine Decline Syndrome is cultural control by cleaning tools between mowing different properties to prevent the spread of pathogen. A third control option for St. Augustine Decline is to mow turf grass only during dry weather because the infected sap is not able to spread as easily.

=== Switchgrass and millet ===
Although a strong strain of the pathogen is economically and aesthetically detrimental, a possible beneficial interaction with a susceptible host by panicum mosaic virus is cross-protection by inoculation of a weak panicum mosaic virus strain. The benefit of inoculation with a weak strain means that the crop will have cross-protection, which means that the crop will not have as extensive of yield loss if the crop is exposed to a more aggressive, virulent strain.

One risk that comes with weak strain inoculation is increased susceptibility to other viral strains and pathogens. Additionally, there is a risk that the weak strain could mutate into a more virulent strain. Alternatively, the inoculated weak viral disease might cause synergistic effects if another viral pathogen infects the plant. Despite the risks posed by cross-protection of crops using weak strains, the method has proven valuable in the control of several other viruses. Cross-protection appears to be the most promising option in the case of switchgrass because of the lack of resistance genes for pathogen control.
