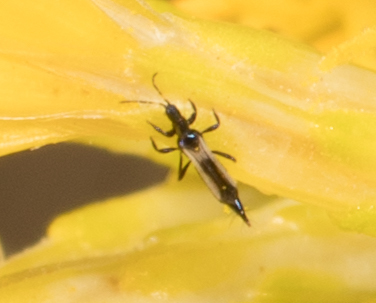

Scientific classification
- Domain: Eukaryota
- Kingdom: Animalia
- Phylum: Arthropoda
- Class: Insecta
- Order: Thysanoptera
- Family: Aeolothripidae
- Genus: Erythrothrips
- Species: E. keeni

Binomial name
- Erythrothrips keeni Moulton, 1929

= Erythrothrips keeni =

Species of thrip

Erythrothrips keeni is a species of predatory thrip in the family Aeolothripidae. It is found in North America.
