= Dianthovirus =

Virus classification
- (unranked): Virus
- Realm: Riboviria
- Kingdom: Orthornavirae
- Phylum: Kitrinoviricota
- Class: Tolucaviricetes
- Order: Tolivirales
- Family: Tombusviridae
- Subfamily: Regressovirinae
- Genus: Dianthovirus

Genus of viruses

Dianthovirus is a genus of viruses, in the family Tombusviridae. Dianthoviruses are plant viruses. There are three species in this genus. The virus probably has a worldwide distribution, and can be transmitted via nematodes, by mechanical inoculation, by grafting of plants and by contact between infected hosts with previously uninfected host.

== Taxonomy ==
The genus contains the following species, listed by scientific name and followed by their common names:

- Dianthovirus dianthi, Carnation ringspot virus
- Dianthovirus meliloti, Sweet clover necrotic mosaic virus
- Dianthovirus trifolii, Red clover necrotic mosaic virus

== Structure ==
Viruses in Dianthovirus are non-enveloped, with icosahedral and spherical geometries, a “hexagonal” appearance, and T=3 symmetry. The diameter is around 28-34 nm. Genomes are linear and segmented, bipartite, around 11.3-1.4kb in length. The buoyant density in CsCl of virions is between 1.363 and 1.366 g cm-3. They have a sedimentation coefficient of 126-132-135 S20w. The pH of their isoelectric point is 4.5. The virions become inactive from about 80-90 °C and are inactive above those temperatures. They are viable in vitro for about 50–70 days. Treatment with ether either decreases or does not alter their infectivity. No lipids have so far been reported.

Genus	Structure	Symmetry	Capsid	Genomic arrangement	Genomic segmentation
Dianthovirus	Icosahedral	T=3	Non-enveloped	Linear	Monopartite

== Life cycle ==
Viral replication is cytoplasmic. Entry into the host cell is achieved by penetration into the host cell. Replication follows the positive stranded RNA virus replication model. Positive stranded RNA virus transcription, using the premature termination model of subgenomic RNA transcription is the method of transcription. Translation takes place by -1 ribosomal frameshifting. The virus exits the host cell by tubule-guided viral movement. Plants serve as the natural host. Transmission routes are mechanical, seed borne, and contact.

Genus	Host details	Tissue tropism	Entry details	Release details	Replication site	Assembly site	Transmission
Dianthovirus	Plants	None	Viral movement; mechanical inoculation	Viral movement	Cytoplasm	Cytoplasm	Mechanical: contact; seed

== Genome ==
These viruses have segmented, bipartite genomes that are linear, positive-sense, single-stranded RNA (1). These genomes are about 5300 nucleotides in length (1). They have a methylated cap at the 5'-end whose sequence type is m7GpppA (1). The genome also codes for non-structural proteins as well as structural proteins (1). Three non-structural proteins have been found (1).
