= Beet yellow net virus =

Beet yellow net virus (BYNV)

Virus classification
- Group: Group IV ((+)ssRNA)
- Family: Luteoviridae
- Genus: Luteovirus
- Species: Beet yellow net virus

Species of virus

Beet yellow net virus (BYNV) is a plant pathogenic virus of the family Luteoviridae.
