= Luteoviridae =

Defunct family of viruses

Luteoviridae was a family of viruses. The family was abolished in 2020 based on evidence that its three genera and seven species unassigned to a genus belonged to two other, existing families.

- The genus Enamovirus was reassigned to the family Solemoviridae.
- The genus Luteovirus was reassigned to the family Tombusviridae.
- The genus Polerovirus was reassigned to the family Solemoviridae.
- The seven unassigned species Barley yellow dwarf virus GPV, Barley yellow dwarf virus SGV, Chickpea stunt disease associated virus, Groundnut rosette assistor virus, Indonesian soybean dwarf virus, Sweet potato leaf speckling virus, and Tobacco necrotic dwarf virus were all reassigned as species unassigned to a genus in Solemoviridae.
