= TNV =

TNV may refer to:

- Tanchangya language
- Times New Viking, an American band
- Tobacco necrosis virus
- Tripura National Volunteers, a defunct nationalist militant group in India
- Telecommunications Network Voltage, a power standard in Australia and New Zealand
