= Machlomovirus =

Virus classification
- (unranked): Virus
- Realm: Riboviria
- Kingdom: Orthornavirae
- Phylum: Kitrinoviricota
- Class: Tolucaviricetes
- Order: Tolivirales
- Family: Tombusviridae
- Subfamily: Procedovirinae
- Genus: Machlomovirus

Genus of viruses

Machlomovirus is a genus of plant viruses, in the family Tombusviridae. Plants serve as natural hosts. There are two species in this genus, including Maize chlorotic mottle virus (MCMV), which causes significant losses in maize production worldwide. MCMV was first identified in the U.S. state of Kansas causing maize lethal necrosis disease/MLN/corn lethal necrosis, a severe disease that negatively affects all stages of development for maize plants.

== Taxonomy ==
The genus contains the following species, listed by scientific name and followed by their common names.

- Machlomovirus liegense, Poaceae Liege machlomovirus
- Machlomovirus zeae, Maize chlorotic mottle virus

== Structure ==
Viruses in Machlomovirus are non-enveloped, with icosahedral and spherical geometries, and T=3 symmetry. The diameter is around 28-34 nm. Genomes are linear, around 4–5.4kb in length.

Genus	Structure	Symmetry	Capsid	Genomic arrangement	Genomic segmentation
Machlomovirus	Icosahedral	T=3	Non-enveloped	Linear	Monopartite

== Life cycle ==
Viral replication is cytoplasmic. Entry into the host cell is achieved by penetration into the host cell. Replication follows the positive stranded RNA virus replication model. Positive stranded RNA virus transcription, using the premature termination model of subgenomic RNA transcription is the method of transcription. Translation takes place by leaky scanning, and suppression of termination. The virus exits the host cell by tubule-guided viral movement. Plants serve as the natural host. Transmission routes are mechanical, seed borne, and contact. Even a small incidence of seed transmission is problematic: Although Kimani et al. 2021 finds MCMV to be almost incapable of successfully making the jump from contaminated seed to infecting a seedling, even a small infected proportion of a field will infect the entire field (via vector) unless quickly removed.

Genus	Host details	Tissue tropism	Entry details	Release details	Replication site	Assembly site	Transmission
Machlomovirus	Plants	None	Viral movement; mechanical inoculation	Viral movement	Cytoplasm	Cytoplasm	Mechanical: contact; seed

This virus can be transmitted by six species of leaf beetle: cereal leaf beetle (Oulema melanopus), the red-headed flea beetle (Systena frontalis), corn flea beetle (Chaetocnema pulicaria), southern corn rootworm (Diabrotica undecimpunctata), northern corn rootworm (D. longicornis) and western corn rootworm (D. virgifera virgifera). It can also be transmitted by the corn thrips, Frankliniella williamsi.
