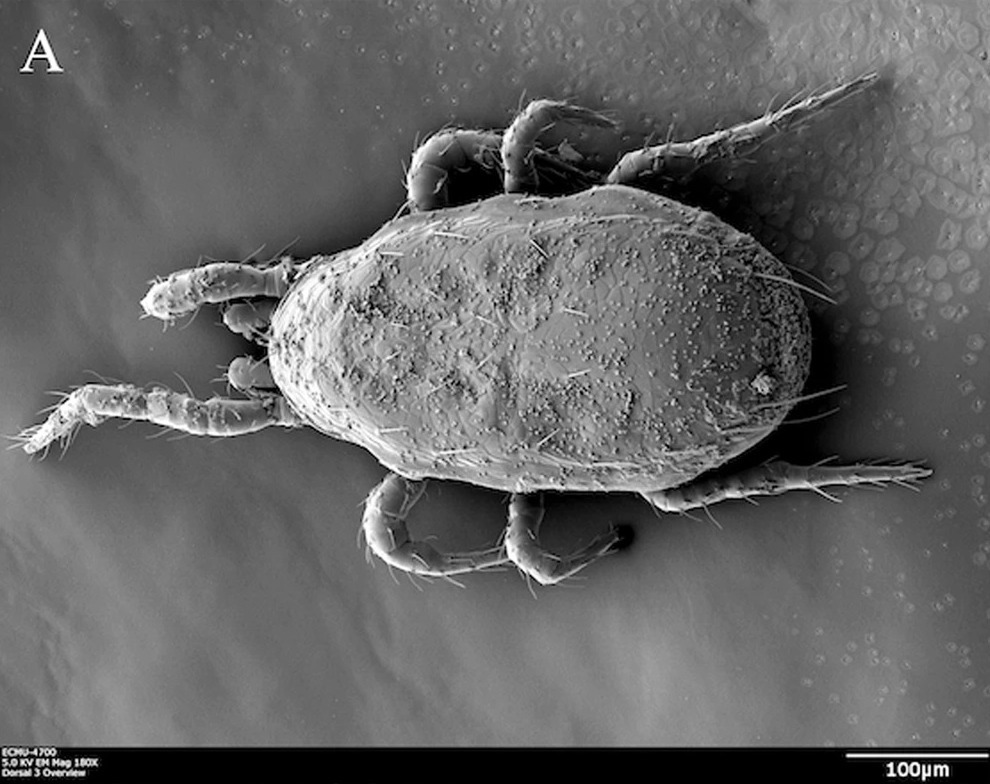

Scientific classification
- Domain: Eukaryota
- Kingdom: Animalia
- Phylum: Arthropoda
- Subphylum: Chelicerata
- Class: Arachnida
- Order: Mesostigmata
- Family: Phytoseiidae
- Genus: Neoseiulus
- Species: N. cucumeris

Binomial name
- Neoseiulus cucumeris (Oudemans, 1930)

Synonyms
- Typhlodromus cucumeris Oudemans; Typhlodromus thripsi MacGill; Amblyseius cucumeris (Oudemans) Athias-Henriot; Amblyseius (Typhlodromopsis) cucumeris (Oudemans); Typhlodromus (Amblyseius) cucumeris (Oudemans); Amblyseius (Amblyseius) cucumeris Wainstein; Neoseiulus coprophilus (Karg); Neoseiulus bellinus (Womersley); Neoseiulus thripsi (MacGill); Amblyseius (Neoseiulus) cucumeris (Oudemans)

= Neoseiulus cucumeris =

Species of mite

Neoseiulus cucumeris, the cucumeris mite, is a species of predatory mite in the family Phytoseiidae. It is used in biological pest control of western flower thrips (Frankliniella occidentalis) in cucumber and some other greenhouse crops.

== Description ==
The mite has a pear-shaped translucent pinkish or tan-coloured body (depending on what it has most recently been feeding on) and grows to a length of between 0.5 and 1 mm (0.02 and 0.04 in). It varies in morphology over its wide range and has been described numerous times under different names, and it is very difficult to distinguish it from other species of predatory mite.

== Biology ==
Eggs of N. cucumeris are oval, white and translucent. They are laid on leaves, on hairs on the veins on the underside of leaves or in domatia. They hatch after about three days into non-feeding larvae which then pass through two nymphal stages before becoming adult. The development time from egg to adult is about eleven days at 25 °C (77 °F). Adult mites live for four to five weeks during which time females each lay about 35 eggs.

This species is an aggressive predator and will feed on the immature stages of western flower thrips, common blossom thrips, onion thrips, melon thrips and chilli thrips, as well as the silverleaf whitefly and Asian citrus psyllid, and several plant-damaging mites. It is most successful with prey feeding on foliage, and less so with those in blossoms. Where there is more than one prey species present, it will tend to concentrate on the easiest one to find. For example, in a 2016 research project on cucumber plants, it was successful in controlling melon thrips on the leaves, but not common blossom thrips on the flowers. In the absence of suitable prey species, this mite can survive and reproduce while feeding on pollen, although survival rates, longevity and fecundity are all superior when prey is included in the diet.

== Use in biocontrol ==
Neoseiulus cucumeris has been used under glass in biocontrol of thrips, whitefly, psyllids, aphids and mites. It is widely available commercially and can be distributed round the crop in sachets suspended from the host plants. These contain the mite mixed with bran, accompanied by bran mites, as a temporary food source.

As the predatory mite most widely used in biological control of thrips, N. cucumeris has produced excellent results in plants with pollen, such as the sweet pepper. It has the advantage that it is easy to maintain and rear. However it is much less effective in modern cucumbers which are a parthenocarpic crop which does not produce pollen.
