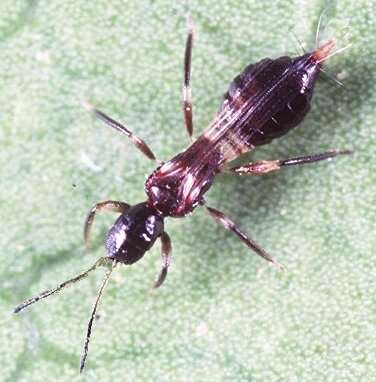
- Adult F. vespiformis.

Scientific classification
- Kingdom: Animalia
- Phylum: Arthropoda
- Class: Insecta
- Order: Thysanoptera
- Family: Aeolothripidae
- Genus: Franklinothrips; Back, 1912

Type species
- Aeolothrips vespiformis Crawford, 1909

Synonyms
- Mitothrips Trybom, 1912; Spathiothrips Richter, 1928

= Franklinothrips =

Genus of thrips

Franklinothrips is a genus of thrips with pantropical distribution.

== Name ==
The genus name is derived from the surname of entomologist H. J. Franklin, who described thrips taxa in the early 1900s. The thrips genus Frankliniella is also named after him. Franklin worked at the entomology department of the University of Massachusetts Amherst in the 1930s.

== Reproduction ==
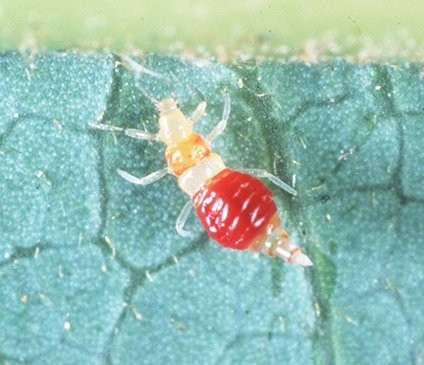
Nymph of F. vespiformis

Most species are apparently bisexual (have both males and females) and occur only in small areas. An exception is F. vespiformis, which is unisexual (mostly females) and occurs in many tropical countries. Only few males were produced during rearing programmes involving F. vespiformis.

== Mimicry ==
The fast-running females are easily misidentified as ants or bethylid wasps (superfamily Chrysidoidea), as they closely mimic ants in behavior and body form. Males are less ant-like in appearance, being smaller, with longer antennae and a less constricted waist.

== Feeding behavior ==
F. orizabensis is known to be unable to survive solely on plant food. It is used as a control agent against thrips on avocado trees. Together with F. vespiformis it has been marketed in Europe as a control agent against thrips in greenhouses. F. vespiformis also feeds on mites, nymphs of a whitefly species and the larvae of an agromyzid fly. F. megalops has been used for thrips control in "internal landscapes".

== Taxonomy ==
- F. atlas Hood, 1957 — Congo, Rwanda.
- F. basseti Mound & Marullo, 1998 — Rainforest trees near Brisbane, Queensland, Australia.
- F. brunneicornis Mound & Renaud, 2005 — New Caledonia.
- F. caballeroi Johansen, 1979 — Mexico, Costa Rica.
- F. fulgidus Hood, 1949 — Southern Brazil.
- F. lineatus Hood, 1949 — Southern Brazil, Costa Rica.
- F. megalops Trybom, 1912 — Widespread in Africa, also Spain, Israel, southern India.
- F. orizabensis Johansen, 1974 — Mexico, southern California.
- F. rarosae Reyes, 1994 — Philippines.
- F. strasseni Mound & Reynaud, 2005 — Nepal.
- F. suzukii Okajima, 1979 — Taiwan.
- F. tani Mirab-balou & Chen, 2011 — China.
- F. tenuicornis Hood, 1915 — Panama to southern Brazil.
- F. variegatus Girault, 1927 — Australia.
- F. vespiformis (Crawford DL, 1909) — Central America, introduced into many tropical countries, including southern USA, Japan, New Caledonia, Australia.

The three neotropical species F. orizabensis, F. tenuicornis and F. vespiformis are closely related.

The species F. megalops, F. rarosae and F. variegatus appear to part of a cline across the Old World tropics from Africa to Australia, with F. rarosae being intermediate in appearance as well as distribution.

The only genus closely related to Franklinothrips is Corynothripoides from Africa, and its only species, C. marginipennis, could even belong to the same genus.

F. caballeroi and F. suzukii are possibly the same species, with one having been distributed through horticultural trade.
