= Aureusvirus =

Virus classification
- (unranked): Virus
- Realm: Riboviria
- Kingdom: Orthornavirae
- Phylum: Kitrinoviricota
- Class: Tolucaviricetes
- Order: Tolivirales
- Family: Tombusviridae
- Subfamily: Procedovirinae
- Genus: Aureusvirus

Genus of viruses

Aureusvirus is a genus of viruses, in the family Tombusviridae. Plants serve as natural hosts. There are six species in this genus.

== Taxonomy ==
The genus contains the following species, listed by scientific name and followed by their common names:

- Aureusvirus aurei, Pothos latent virus
- Aureusvirus cucumis, Cucumber leaf spot virus
- Aureusvirus dioscoreae, Yam spherical virus
- Aureusvirus sambuci, Elderberry aureusvirus 1
- Aureusvirus sorghi, Johnsongrass chlorotic stripe mosaic virus
- Aureusvirus zeae, Maize white line mosaic virus

== Structure ==
Viruses in Aureusvirus are non-enveloped, with icosahedral and Spherical geometries, and T=3 symmetry. The diameter is around 30 nm. Genomes are linear, around 4.4kb in length.

Genus	Structure	Symmetry	Capsid	Genomic arrangement	Genomic segmentation
Aureusvirus	Icosahedral	T=3	Non-enveloped	Linear	Monopartite

== Life cycle ==
Viral replication is cytoplasmic, and is lysogenic. Entry into the host cell is achieved by penetration into the host cell. Replication follows the positive stranded RNA virus replication model. Positive stranded RNA virus transcription, using the premature termination model of subgenomic RNA transcription is the method of transcription. Translation takes place by leaky scanning, and suppression of termination. The virus exits the host cell by tubule-guided viral movement. Plants serve as the natural host. Transmission routes are mechanical, seed borne, and contact.

Genus	Host details	Tissue tropism	Entry details	Release details	Replication site	Assembly site	Transmission
Aureusvirus	Plants	None	Viral movement; mechanical inoculation	Viral movement	Cytoplasm	Cytoplasm	Mechanical: contact; seed
