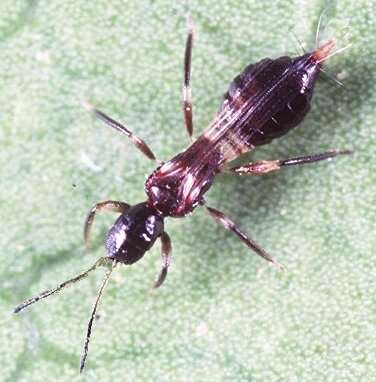
- Franklinothrips vespiformis

Scientific classification
- Kingdom: Animalia
- Phylum: Arthropoda
- Clade: Pancrustacea
- Class: Insecta
- Order: Thysanoptera
- Family: Aeolothripidae
- Genus: Franklinothrips
- Species: F. vespiformis

Binomial name
- Franklinothrips vespiformis (D. L. Crawford, 1909)

= Franklinothrips vespiformis =

Species of thrip

Franklinothrips vespiformis, the vespiform thrips, is a species of predatory thrip in the family Aeolothripidae. It is found in the Caribbean, Central America, North America, Oceania, South America, Southern Asia, and Europe. It has been used in biological control of Bemisia tabaci (silverleaf whitefly).
