= One Acre Fund =

Social Enterprise based in Kenya

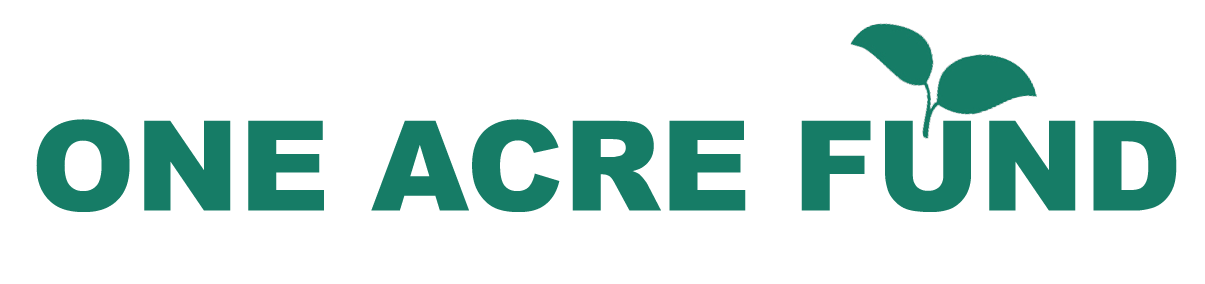
- Type: Social Enterprise
- Industry: Economic Development
- Founded: February 2006
- Founders: Andrew Youn, John Gachunga, Eric Pohlman
- Headquarters: Kakamega, Kenya
- Key people: Andrew Youn, Sr. Partner, Executive Director
- Revenue: 79,791,350 United States dollar (2016)
- Total assets: 223,099,275 United States dollar (2022)
- Website: oneacrefund.org

One Acre Fund is a social enterprise that supplies smallholder farmers in East Africa with asset-based financing and agriculture training services to reduce hunger and poverty. Headquartered in Kakamega, Kenya, the organization works with farmers in rural villages throughout Kenya, Rwanda, Burundi, Tanzania, Uganda, Malawi, Nigeria, Zambia, and Ethiopia.

Using a market-based approach, One Acre Fund facilitates activities and transactions at various levels of the farming value chain, including seed sourcing and market support. In 2020, farmers who worked with One Acre Fund reported 33% in additional profit compared to non-participating farmers.

== How it works ==
One Acre Fund offers smallholder farmers an asset-based loan at an average APR of 18% that includes: 1) distribution of seeds and fertilizer; 2) financing for farm inputs; 3) training on agriculture techniques; and 4) market facilitation to maximize profits. Each service bundle is around US$80 in value and includes crop insurance to mitigate the risks of drought and disease.

To receive the One Acre Fund loan and training, farmers must join a village group that is supported by a local One Acre Fund field officer. Field officers meet regularly with the farmer groups to coordinate the delivery of farm inputs, administer training, and collect repayments. One Acre Fund offers a flexible repayment system: farmers may pay back their loans in any increment at any time during the growing season. Beyond their core program model, One Acre Fund also offers smallholder farmers opportunities to purchase additional products and services on credit. These include solar lights and reusable sanitary pads.

== History ==
The organization was founded by Andrew Youn in 2006. While earning his MBA at the Kellogg School of Management, Youn visited western Kenya in August 2005 and interviewed smallholder farmers about their quality of life. Many of those farmers were enduring an annual "hunger season" and were unable to feed their families from their one acre of land. Upon returning to Kellogg in the fall, Youn designed a business plan to employ a market-based approach to introducing productive farming techniques to smallholder farmers in East Africa. One Acre Fund launched in Bungoma, Kenya, in February 2006, initially serving 38 farm families. Youn's classmate Matthew Forti became the Founding Board Chair, while John Gachunga joined as co-founder in 2006 and Eric Pohlman as co-founder in 2007.

In April 2006, One Acre Fund was awarded the Social Entrepreneurship Track of the Yale 50K Business Plan Competition and the Social E-Challenge of the Business Association of Stanford Entrepreneurial Students (BASES). In May 2006, Youn received an Echoing Green Fellowship, which provided a two-year stipend to pursue One Acre Fund full-time.

Since its founding, One Acre Fund has launched operations in Kenya, Rwanda, Burundi, Tanzania, Uganda, Ethiopia, Nigeria, Zambia, and Malawi.

== Sustainability ==
One Acre Fund states that it practices sustainable intensification and land management. The organization trains smallholder farmers on how to create and use compost and how to minimize the amount of fertilizer used with a micro-dosing technique. Agroforestry is a key part of One Acre Fund's work; in 2020, One Acre Fund farmers planted more than 24 million trees.

The organization has also been recognized for its model of financial sustainability. In 2020, 77% of its field operating costs were covered by farmer repayments. "Field operating costs" exclude R&D, pilot projects, government relations, monitoring, as well as fundraising and other charity-specific costs.

== Funding and recognition ==
The One Acre Fund model has won grants from the Echoing Green and Skoll Foundations and received the Financial Times/IFC award for "basic needs financing" in 2010 and 2011.

In 2007, One Acre Fund received a $300,000 grant from the Draper Richards Foundation and a $100,000 grant from Mulago Social Investments. Between 2009 and 2010, One Acre Fund received $6.5 million from the Pershing Square Foundation towards its Permanent Fund, which provides the basic capital to make loans to farmers, and in 2010, One Acre Fund was recognized by the Skoll Foundation with a $750,000 grant. Since then, it has received grants from numerous foundations, including The MasterCard Foundation, Bill & Melinda Gates Foundation, and the Swedish Postcode Lottery.

In 2012, journalist Roger Thurow wrote a book about a year in the lives of four One Acre Fund farmers in Kenya entitled The Last Hunger Season: A Year in an African Farm Community on the Brink of Change. In 2015, The Guardian published an article titled "Kenya's Small-Scale Farmers Borrow Seeds To Grow Potential" that takes a closer look at their field operations. Later that year, David Bornstein of The New York Times wrote an article titled "Energizing the Green Revolution in Africa" that profiles the organization and its work with smallholder farmers in East Africa.

In 2016, One Acre Fund won a $15m grant from the Global Innovation Fund. In 2018, One Acre accepted a donation of 700,000 € from the new Monsanto owner, Bayer, to support improved poultry products and digital technologies. In 2022, One Acre Fund was the New York Times Holiday Impact Grand Prize Winner, and in 2023, the organization was awarded the Hilton Humanitarian Prize, the world’s largest annual humanitarian award presented to nonprofit organizations judged to have made extraordinary contributions toward alleviating human suffering.

== Statistics ==
In 2022, One Acre Fund served more than 4 million farm families, including 1.5 million in the full-service program and 2.4 million via targeted interventions like agroforestry. Loan repayment rates amongst full-service program clients were 96%.

== Response to maize disease ==
After the spread of maize lethal necrosis (a maize disease) across western Kenya in 2013, One Acre Fund recommended farmers abandon maize for millet and sorghum. Initially, this recommendation was met with some amount of criticism from farmers in the program who expressed their initial shock and displeasure as ugali, a maize-based food, is a staple in the Kenyan diet.

However, those farmers who stayed with the program found success, as highlighted in an interview later that same year with the website Humanosphere. "Unlike maize, the price for millet is relatively consistent throughout the year," said the farmers. "...To optimize profit, maize has to be stored for months until peak prices are reached. When a financial emergency emerges, farmers lose out when they have to sell too early. With millet, the problem is erased."

== Criticism of lengthy hiring practices ==
One Acre Fund has been criticized for its confusing hiring process. In Kenya, their hiring process has led some to accuse them of harvesting data from prospective job applicants. One Acre Fund has denied these claims, but acknowledged the need for the organization to improve its lengthy hiring process.

== See also ==
- Social entrepreneurship
- Microfinance
