= Cycadothrips =

Scientific classification
- Domain: Eukaryota
- Kingdom: Animalia
- Phylum: Arthropoda
- Class: Insecta
- Order: Thysanoptera
- Family: Aeolothripidae
- Subfamily: Cycadothripinae; Mound, 1991
- Genus: Cycadothrips; Mound, 1991

Type species
- C. chadwicki Mound, 1991

Genus of thrips

Cycadothrips is a genus of thrips first discovered on the male cones of the cycad Macrozamia communis in New South Wales. They pollinate cycads which are mostly evolved for wind-pollination. The thrips transport pollen from the male cones to the female cones on separate plants.

The genus has a pair of longitudinal sutures on the metasternum and a pair of expanded sensory areas on the third antennal segment. The genus has been placed in a separate subfamily under the Aeolothripidae. Three species are known. Apart from the type species C. chadwicki which pollinates M. communis there is C. albrechti pollinates Macrozamia macdonnellii in central Australia and C. emmaliami which pollinates Macrozamia riedlei in southwest Australia. In C. chadwicki, it has been observed that the cycas mediates the repelling of the thrips from the male cones through heat-production and attraction by the female cones during the same period through volatile emissions.
