= Macrolophus separatus =

Scientific classification
- Domain: Eukaryota
- Kingdom: Animalia
- Phylum: Arthropoda
- Class: Insecta
- Order: Hemiptera
- Suborder: Heteroptera
- Family: Miridae
- Tribe: Dicyphini
- Genus: Macrolophus
- Species: M. separatus

Binomial name
- Macrolophus separatus (Uhler, 1894)

Species of true bug

Macrolophus separatus is a species of plant bug in the family Miridae. It is found in the Caribbean Sea and North America.
