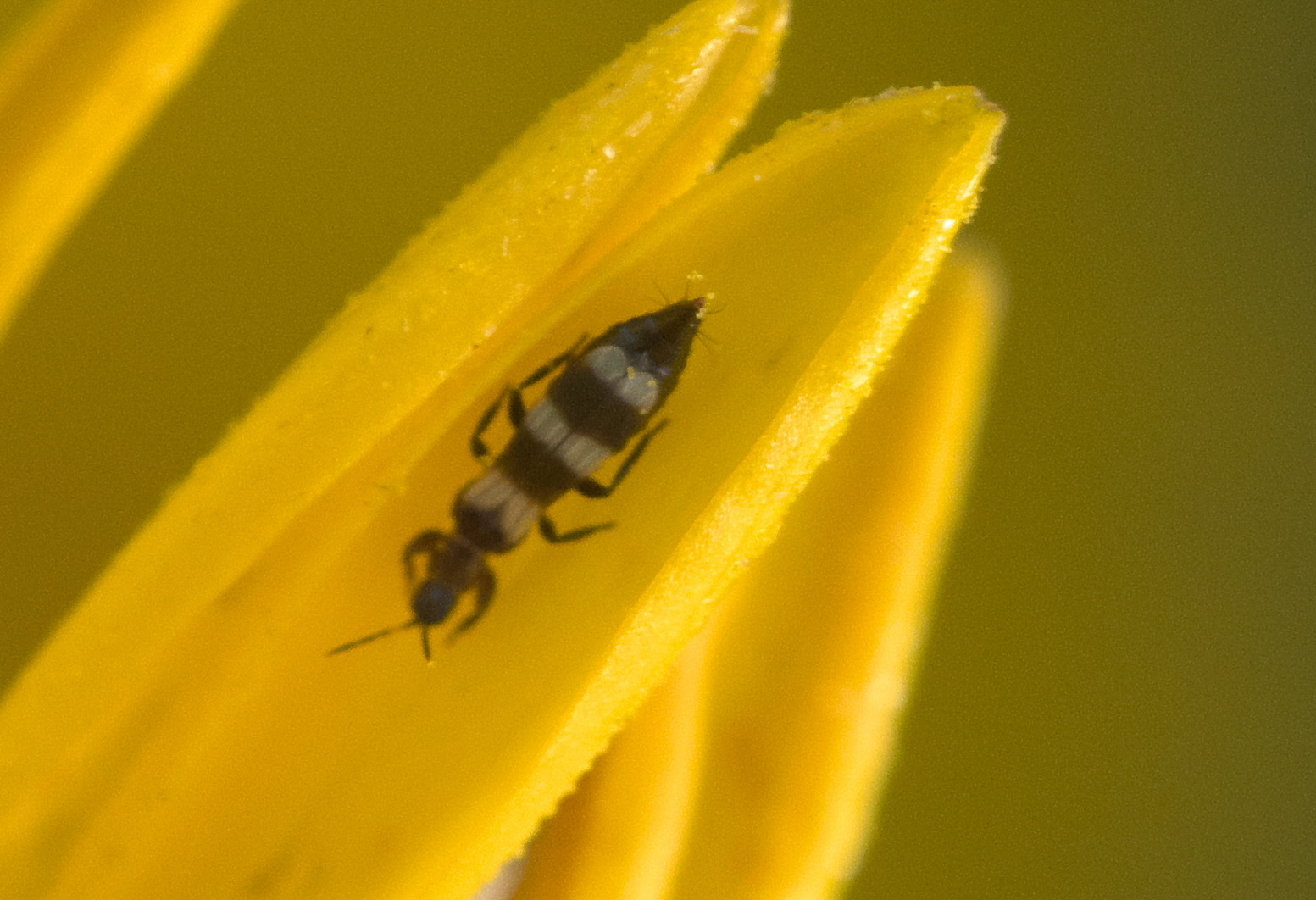

Scientific classification
- Kingdom: Animalia
- Phylum: Arthropoda
- Class: Insecta
- Order: Thysanoptera
- Family: Aeolothripidae
- Genus: Aeolothrips; Haliday, 1836

= Aeolothrips =

Genus of thrips

Aeolothrips is a genus of predatory thrips in the family Aeolothripidae. There are more than 80 described species in Aeolothrips.

== Species ==
These 89 species belong to the genus Aeolothrips:

- Aeolothrips afghanus Jenser, 1984
- Aeolothrips albicinctus Haliday, 1836
- Aeolothrips albithorax Pelikan, 1964
- Aeolothrips andalusiacus zur Strassen, 1973
- Aeolothrips arnebiae Priesner, 1948
- Aeolothrips asirensis zur Strassen, 1979
- Aeolothrips astutus Priesner, 1926
- Aeolothrips aureus Moulton, 1931
- Aeolothrips auricestus Treherne, 1919
- Aeolothrips balati Pelikan, 1958
- Aeolothrips bhattii Alavi, Modarres Awal, Fekrat, Minaei & Manzari, 2015
- Aeolothrips bicolor Hinds, 1902
- Aeolothrips bournieri Lacasa, 1983
- Aeolothrips brevicauda Hood, 1935
- Aeolothrips brevicornis Bagnall, 1915
- Aeolothrips brunneipictus Bailey, 1951
- Aeolothrips bucheti Bagnall, 1934
- Aeolothrips carpobrotus Hartwig, 1952
- Aeolothrips citricinctus Bagnall, 1933
- Aeolothrips clarus Bailey, 1951
- Aeolothrips collaris Priesner, 1919
- Aeolothrips crassus Hood, 1912
- Aeolothrips crucifer Hood, 1935
- Aeolothrips cursor Priesner, 1939
- Aeolothrips deserticola Priesner, 1929
- Aeolothrips distinctus Bhatti, 1971
- Aeolothrips duvali Moulton, 1927
- Aeolothrips eremicola (Priesner, 1938)
- Aeolothrips ericae Bagnall, 1920
- Aeolothrips fallax zur Strassen, 1977
- Aeolothrips fasciatus (Linnaeus, 1758)
- Aeolothrips flaviventer Pelikan, 1983
- Aeolothrips fuscus Watson, 1931
- Aeolothrips gloriosus Bagnall, 1914
- Aeolothrips guitiani Berzosa & Maroto, 1990
- Aeolothrips gundeliae Alavi, Awal, Fekrat, Minaei & Manzari, 2016
- Aeolothrips hartleyi Moulton, 1927
- Aeolothrips heinzi zur Strassen, 1990
- Aeolothrips hesperus Bailey, 1951
- Aeolothrips intermedius Bagnall, 1934
- Aeolothrips interruptus Bailey, 1951
- Aeolothrips kurosawai Bhatti, 1971
- Aeolothrips kuwanaii Moulton, 1907
- Aeolothrips laurencei Alavi, Modarres Awal, Fekrat, Minaei & Manzari, 2015
- Aeolothrips linarius Priesner, 1948
- Aeolothrips manteli Titschack, 1962
- Aeolothrips masflavus Priesner, 1933
- Aeolothrips melaleucus (Haliday, 1852)
- Aeolothrips melisi Priesner, 1936
- Aeolothrips metacrucifer Bailey, 1951
- Aeolothrips mexicanus Priesner, 1924
- Aeolothrips microstriatus Hood
- Aeolothrips modestus zur Strassen, 1965
- Aeolothrips montanus Bailey, 1951
- Aeolothrips montivagus Priesner, 1948
- Aeolothrips nasturtii Jones, 1912
- Aeolothrips neyrizi Alavi, 2017
- Aeolothrips nitidus Moulton, 1946
- Aeolothrips occidentalis Bailey, 1951
- Aeolothrips oculatus Hood, 1927
- Aeolothrips oregonus Hood, 1935
- Aeolothrips pallidicornis Hood, 1938
- Aeolothrips pandyani Ramakrishna
- Aeolothrips pelikani Titschack, 1964
- Aeolothrips priesneri Knechtel, 1923
- Aeolothrips propinquus Bagnall, 1924
- Aeolothrips pulcher von Oettingen, 1943
- Aeolothrips pyrenaicus Bagnall, 1934
- Aeolothrips quercicola Bournier, 1971
- Aeolothrips saharae zur Strassen, 1968
- Aeolothrips scabiosatibia Moulton, 1930
- Aeolothrips scitus zur Strassen, 1965
- Aeolothrips sobrinus zur Strassen, 1979
- Aeolothrips surcalifornianus Johansen, 1989
- Aeolothrips tauricus Derbeneva, 1959
- Aeolothrips tenuicornis Bagnall, 1926
- Aeolothrips terrestris Bailey, 1951
- Aeolothrips vehemens Hood, 1927
- Aeolothrips verbasci Knechtel, 1955
- Aeolothrips versicolor Uzel, 1895
- Aeolothrips vittatus Haliday, 1836
- Aeolothrips vittipennis Hood, 1912
- Aeolothrips wetmorei Hood, 1927
- Aeolothrips xizangengsis Han, 1986
- Aeolothrips yunnanensis Han, 1986
- Aeolothrips zurstrasseni Minaei, 2013
- † Aeolothrips extinctus Priesner & Quiévreux, 1935
- † Aeolothrips jarzembowskii Shmakov, 2014
