= Turnip crinkle virus (TCV) repressor of minus strand synthesis H5 =

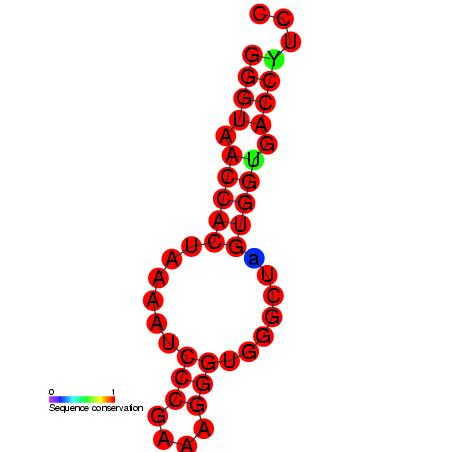
- Predicted secondary structure and sequence conservation of TCV_H5

Identifiers
- Symbol: TCV_H5
- Rfam: RF00500

Other data
- RNA type: Cis-reg
- Domain(s): Viruses
- SO: SO:0000233
- PDB structures: PDBe

The TCV hairpin 5 (H5) is an RNA element found in the turnip crinkle virus. This RNA element is composed of a stem-loop that contains a large symmetrical internal loop (LSL). H5 can repress minus-strand synthesis when the 3' side of the LSL pairs with the 4 bases at the 3'-terminus of the RNA(GCCC-OH).

== See also ==
- Turnip crinkle virus (TCV) core promoter hairpin (Pr)
- Turnip crinkle virus (TCV) hairpin H4
