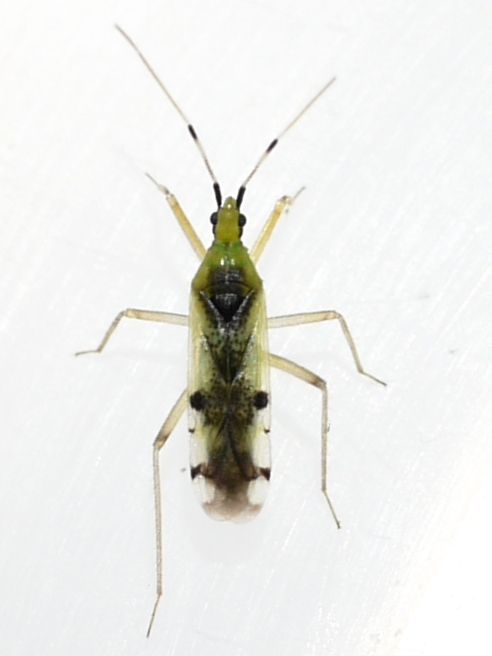

Scientific classification
- Kingdom: Animalia
- Phylum: Arthropoda
- Clade: Pancrustacea
- Class: Insecta
- Order: Hemiptera
- Suborder: Heteroptera
- Family: Miridae
- Genus: Macrolophus
- Species: M. brevicornis

Binomial name
- Macrolophus brevicornis Knight

= Macrolophus brevicornis =

Species of true bug

Macrolophus brevicornis is a species of plant bug in the family Miridae.
