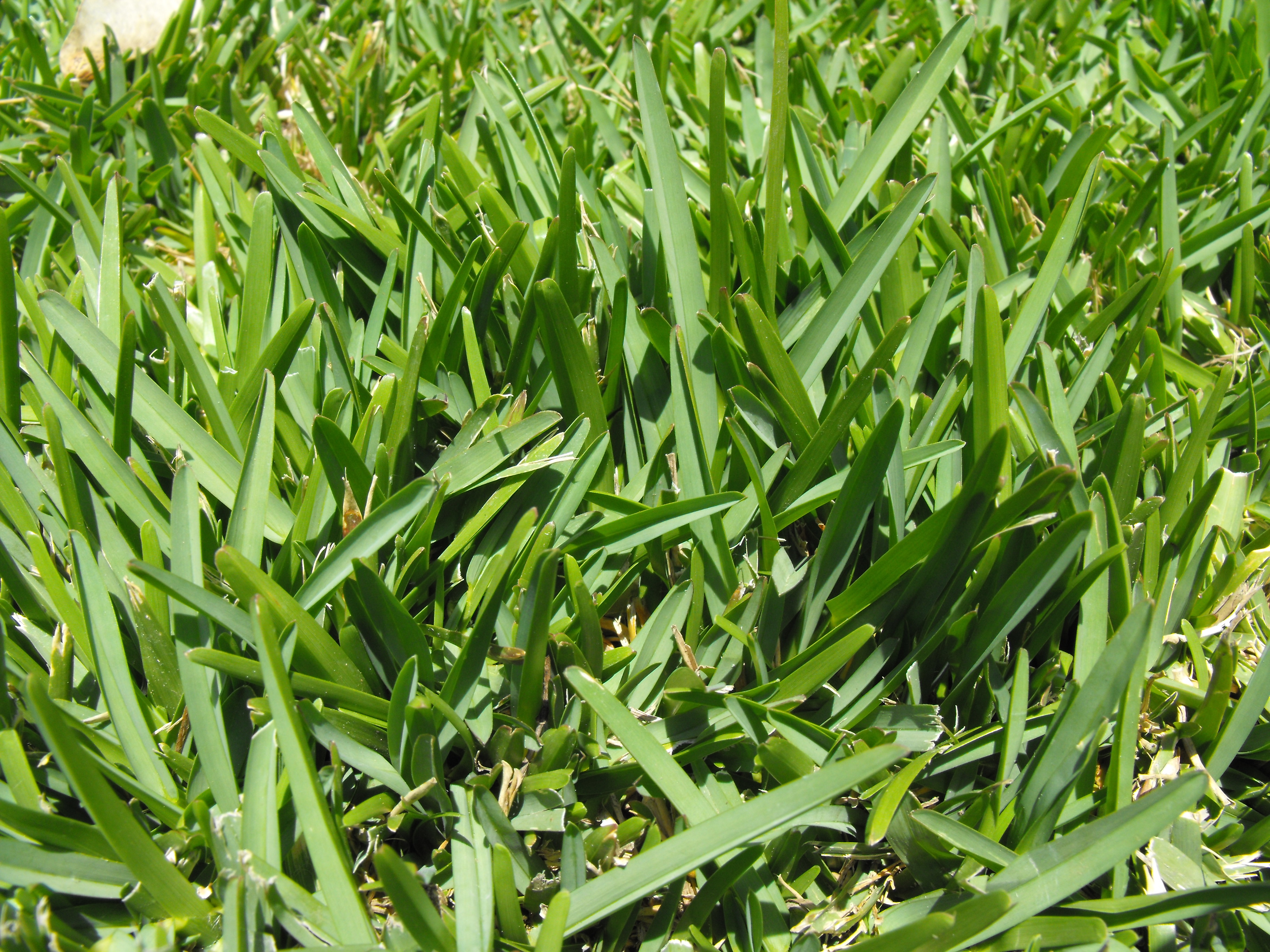

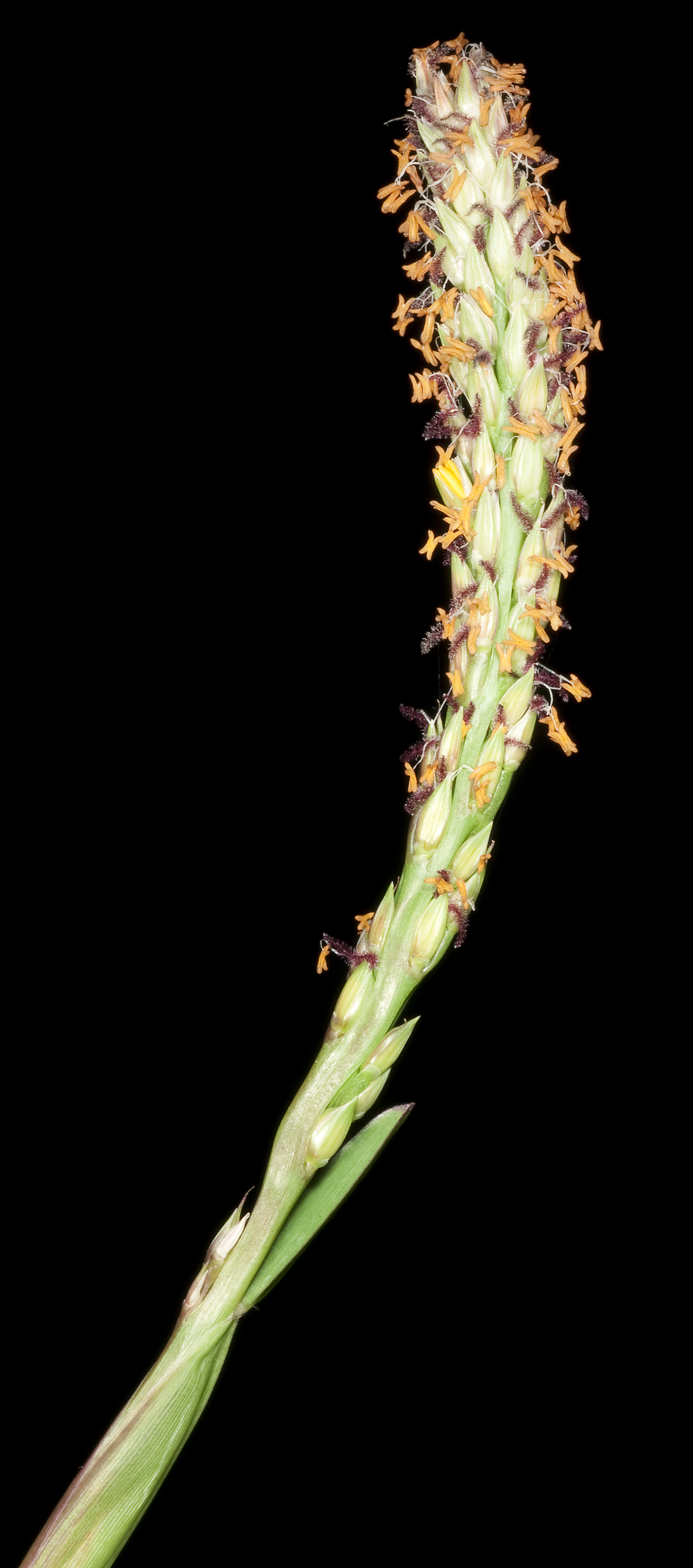

Scientific classification
- Kingdom: Plantae
- Clade: Embryophytes
- Clade: Tracheophytes
- Clade: Angiosperms
- Clade: Monocots
- Clade: Commelinids
- Order: Poales
- Family: Poaceae
- Subfamily: Panicoideae
- Genus: Stenotaphrum
- Species: S. secundatum

Binomial name
- Stenotaphrum secundatum (Walt.) Kuntze

= St. Augustine grass =

Species of plant

St. Augustine grass (Stenotaphrum secundatum), also known as buffalo turf in Australia and buffalo grass in South Africa, is a species of grass in the family Poaceae. It is a warm-season lawn grass that is popular for cultivation in tropical and subtropical regions. It is a medium- to high-maintenance grass that forms a thick, carpetlike sod, crowding out most weeds and other grasses.

== Characteristics ==
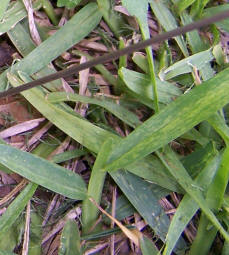
Specimens with the St. Augustine decline infection

St. Augustine is a dark green grass with broad, flat blades. It spreads by aboveground stolons, commonly known as "runners", and forms a dense layer.

The grass occurs on both sides of the Atlantic Ocean, including much of the southeastern United States, Texas, Mexico, and Central and South America. It has escaped cultivation in California, Hawaii, many Pacific islands, South Africa and New Zealand.

St. Augustine grass occurs in most Caribbean and Mediterranean areas. It grows best in tropical climates. It is often seen in lagoons and marshes, on shorelines, and wherever there is a good amount of moisture.

== Planting and propagation ==
Only recently has commercially valuable and viable seed for St. Augustine become available, so it has typically been propagated by plugs, sprigs, or sod. Once the grass is cultivated, it can propagate on its own.

St. Augustine can grow in a wide range of soil types with a pH between 5.0 and 8.5. It usually blooms in spring and summer.

== Uses ==
St. Augustine grass is commonly used in pastures and on ranches. It is a popular lawn grass, rivalling bermudagrass, though St. Augustine is somewhat less drought-tolerant.

== Cultivars ==
A number of cultivars have been developed:

- 'Captiva' - released in 2007. Developed by the University of Florida for its resistance to the southern chinch bug and its dwarf profile, which requires less mowing.
- 'Floratam' - released in 1973. Developed during an academic collaboration between the University of Florida and Texas A&M University. Resists the viral infection St. Augustine decline (SAD). Not as cold- or shade-tolerant.
- 'Floratine' - released in 1959. Has a darker color and finer texture. Tolerates lower temperatures and needs less mowing.
- 'Palmetto' - released in the mid-1990s. A smaller, lighter green grass.
- 'Raleigh' - released in 1980. Tolerant of cold, but susceptible to insects and disease.
- 'Sapphire' - released in 2004. Selected from Australia for its dark blue-green leaves and purple stolons and rapid lateral growth.
- 'Seville' - released in 1980. Similar to 'Floratam', but with a finer texture.
- 'Sir Walter Buffalo' - released in 1996. Developed for Australian conditions with traits such as heat and drought.
- 'Texas Common' - Most similar to the natural species, it has fallen out of favor due to its susceptibility to the incurable St. Augustine decline virus.
- 'Variegatum' - in 1993 it is given the prestigious Award of Garden Merit by the Royal Horticulture Society. It is a creeping evergreen grass with striped white leaves.
