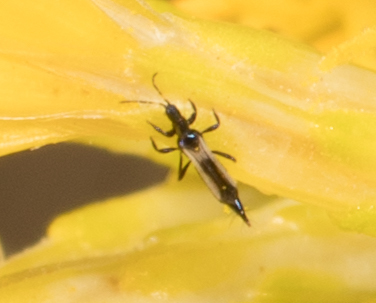
- Erythrothrips keeni

Scientific classification
- Domain: Eukaryota
- Kingdom: Animalia
- Phylum: Arthropoda
- Class: Insecta
- Order: Thysanoptera
- Family: Aeolothripidae
- Genus: Erythrothrips; Moulton, 1911

= Erythrothrips =

Genus of thrips

Erythrothrips is a genus of predatory thrips in the family Aeolothripidae. There are about 11 described species in Erythrothrips.

== Species ==
These 11 species belong to the genus Erythrothrips:

- Erythrothrips arizonae Moulton, 1911
- Erythrothrips bishoppi Moulton, 1929
- Erythrothrips brasiliensis Hood
- Erythrothrips costalis Hood
- Erythrothrips diabolus (Priesner, 1932)
- Erythrothrips durango Watson, 1924
- Erythrothrips fasciculatus Moulton, 1929
- Erythrothrips keeni Moulton, 1929
- Erythrothrips loripes Hood
- Erythrothrips nigripennis Hood
- Erythrothrips stygicus Hood
