= Frankliniella williamsi =

Corn thrips

Scientific classification
- Domain: Eukaryota
- Kingdom: Animalia
- Phylum: Arthropoda
- Class: Insecta
- Order: Thysanoptera
- Family: Thripidae
- Genus: Frankliniella
- Species: F. williamsi

Binomial name
- Frankliniella williamsi Hood, 1915

Synonyms
- Frankliniella flavens Moulton, 1928; Frankliniella spinosa Moulton, 1936

Species of thrips

Frankliniella williamsi, the corn thrips, is a species of thrips in the family Thripidae.

== Description ==
Thrips of this species are yellow except for the distal antennal segments, which are brown. The head is wider than long. The antennae are 8-segmented, with segments III and IV each having a forked sense cone, and VIII being roughly twice the length of VII. There are three pairs of ocellar setae, with pair III being roughly as long as the distance between the hind ocelli and arising just inside the anterior margins of the ocellar triangle. There are also postocular setae, with pair IV being (depending on the source) either shorter than the distance between the hind ocelli or as long as this distance.

Posterior to the head is the pronotum, which has 4-5 pairs of elongate setae. The mesofurca has spinula. The median area of the metanotum is transverse anteriorly and has irregular equiangular or longitudinal reticulations posteriorly. Also, the metanotum has median setae longer than lateral setae and arising at the anterior margin, and it has campaniform sensilla.

The tarsi of the mid and hind legs are 2-segmented.

Each forewing is pale in colour and has 2 complete rows of veinal setae.

On the abdomen, tergites V-VIII have paired ctenidia laterally, and those on tergite VIII are anterolateral to the spiracles. Also on tergite VIII, there is a posteromarginal comb with long, fine, closely spaced microtrichia on broadly triangular bases. Sternite II usually has 1 or 2 long discal setae medially, while sternites III-VII lack discal setae. Sternite VII has median setae arising at or close to the posterior margin.

Males and females of F. williamsi are similar. However, males differ in being smaller-bodied, tergite IX having the median pair of setae shorter than the lateral pair, sternites III-VII having small, oval glandular areas and sternite VII having a toothed craspedum on the posterior margin.

== Distribution ==
Frankliniella williamsi is believed to originate from Central America, but it is now widespread around the world in the tropics and subtropics.

== Ecology ==
This species breeds in leaf axils of young grasses, including maize (Zea mays). Its feeding on young leaves creates streaks. It is one of the vectors of maize chlorotic mottle virus, a pest of maize.
