= Luteovirus =

Virus classification
- (unranked): Virus
- Realm: Riboviria
- Kingdom: Orthornavirae
- Phylum: Kitrinoviricota
- Class: Tolucaviricetes
- Order: Tolivirales
- Family: Tombusviridae
- Genus: Luteovirus

Genus of viruses

Luteovirus is a genus of viruses, in the family Tombusviridae. There are 14 species in this genus. Plants serve as natural hosts. The geographical distribution of Luteoviruses is widespread, with the virus primarily infecting plants via transmission by aphid vectors. The virus only replicates within the host cell and not within the vector . The name 'luteovirus' arises from the Latin luteus, which is translated as 'yellow'. Luteovirus was given this name due to the symptomatic yellowing of the plant that occurs as a result of infection.

== Taxonomy ==
The genus contains the following species, listed by scientific name and followed by their common names:

- Luteovirus avii, Cherry associated luteovirus
- Luteovirus glycinis, Soybean dwarf virus
- Luteovirus kerbihordei, Barley yellow dwarf virus kerII
- Luteovirus kertrihordei, Barley yellow dwarf virus kerIII
- Luteovirus mali, Apple luteovirus 1
- Luteovirus mavhordei, Barley yellow dwarf virus MAV
- Luteovirus nucipersicae, Nectarine stem pitting associated virus
- Luteovirus pashordei, Barley yellow dwarf virus PAS
- Luteovirus pavhordei, Barley yellow dwarf virus PAV
- Luteovirus phaseoli, Bean leafroll virus
- Luteovirus rosae, Rose spring dwarf-associated virus
- Luteovirus sgvhordei, Barley yellow dwarf virus SGV
- Luteovirus sociomali, Apple associated luteovirus
- Luteovirus trifolii, Red clover associated luteovirus

== Morphology and genome structure ==
Viruses in Luteovirus are non-enveloped, with icosahedral and spherical geometries, and T=3 symmetry. The diameter is around 25-30 nm, with 32 capsomeres in each nucleocapsid. The nucleic acid content is around 28%. Luteovirus is a group IV virus according to the Baltimore classification of viruses. Each virion contains a single strand of (+) sense RNA. The genome is non-segmented, linear and between 5300 and 5900 nucleotides long. Notably, luteoviruses have two 5' open reading frames (ORFs) which are located upstream of the coat protein. One such ORF encodes an RNA-dependent RNA polymerase. Several other ORFs are present at the 3' terminus and are expressed from subgenomic RNA. Viruses in Luteovirus also lack polyadenylation at the 3' terminus.

Genus	Structure	Symmetry	Capsid	Genomic arrangement	Genomic segmentation
Luteovirus	Icosahedral	T=3	Non-enveloped	Linear	Monopartite

== Life cycle ==
Viral replication is cytoplasmic. Entry into the host cell is achieved by penetration into the host cell. Replication follows the positive stranded RNA virus replication model. Positive stranded RNA virus transcription is the method of transcription. Translation takes place by leaky scanning, -1 ribosomal frameshifting, and suppression of termination. The virus exits the host cell by tubule-guided viral movement. Plants serve as the natural host. The virus is transmitted via a vector (insects). Transmission routes are vector and mechanical.

Genus	Host details	Tissue tropism	Entry details	Release details	Replication site	Assembly site	Transmission
Luteovirus	Plants	Phloem	Viral movement; mechanical inoculation	Viral movement	Cytoplasm	Cytoplasm	Mechanical inoculation: aphids

== See also ==
- Beet yellow net virus
