= Tobacco necrosis virus A =

Virus classification
- (unranked): Virus
- Realm: Riboviria
- Kingdom: Orthornavirae
- Phylum: Kitrinoviricota
- Class: Tolucaviricetes
- Order: Tolivirales
- Family: Tombusviridae
- Genus: Alphanecrovirus
- Species: Alphanecrovirus nicotianae

Synonyms
- tulip Augusta disease virus bean stipple streak virus cucumber systemic necrosis virus strawberry necrotic rosette virus

Species of virus

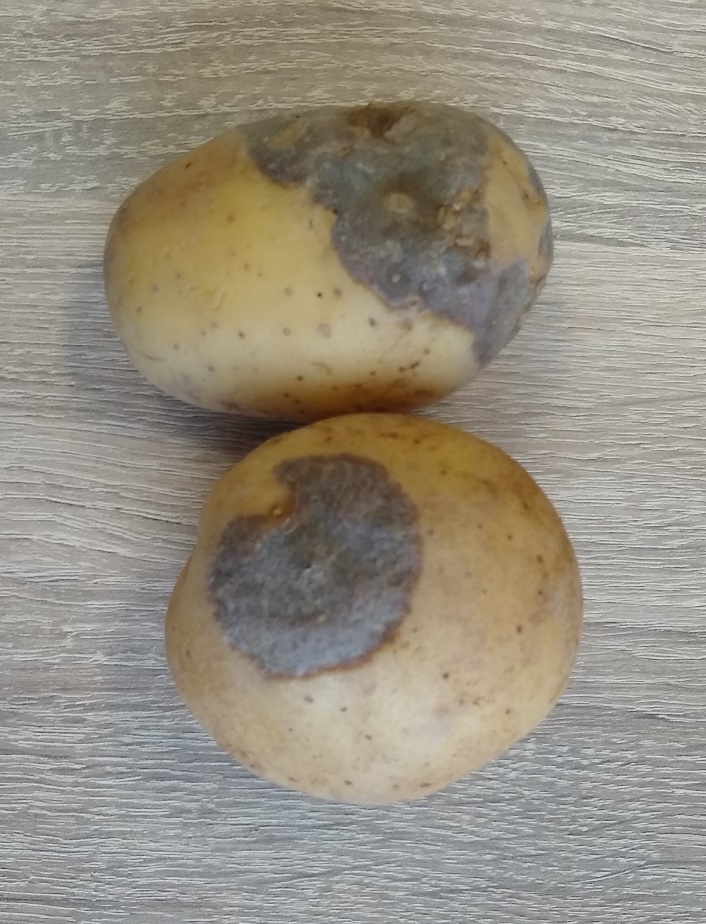
Tobacco necrosis virus present on potatoes

Tobacco necrosis virus A (TNV) is a plant pathogenic virus of the family Tombusviridae.

== Hosts and symptoms ==
Tobacco necrosis virus (TNV) can thrive on a handful of viable hosts. These hosts include tobacco, zucchini, cucumbers, carrots, French bean, tomatoes, potatoes, and tulips. There are a variety of symptoms that are dependent on the host species. In infected plants, abnormal coloring or necrotic tissue in the leaves may occur and roots may have lesions. If bark is present on the plant, it may become discolored. Fruit or tubers can become covered with sunken and discolored spots and can be smaller overall. On a whole-plant scale, damping off or early dying may occur.

== Management ==
Currently, there is not a way to chemically control tobacco necrosis virus. There are, however, cultural management options to reduce the risk of the virus. Prior to planting, one can reduce risk of this disease by investigating the history of their soil for past presence of TNV or of its fungal host vector Olpidium brassicae. One can also avoid planting susceptible crops after potatoes or tomatoes, which create favorable conditions for TNV. While growing the crop, one can reduce disease risk by washing and disinfecting hands and tools regularly and by carefully inspecting the crop for symptoms.

== Importance ==
While tobacco necrosis virus can infect many crops, it has a small economic impact relative to other plant pathogens. It is not commonly occurring or widespread in crops and does not have as severe of an effect on a crop as other, more important pathogens. TNV has many unusual and uncommon features when compared to other viruses, and therefore has some scientific importance. For example, TNV has a high level of resistance to heat and chemical agents, as well as to degradation due to aging. TNV is also unusual in that it can be spread via a fungus (Olpidium brassicae) for some hosts and in some environments, and also in that it can be both air- and water-borne.
