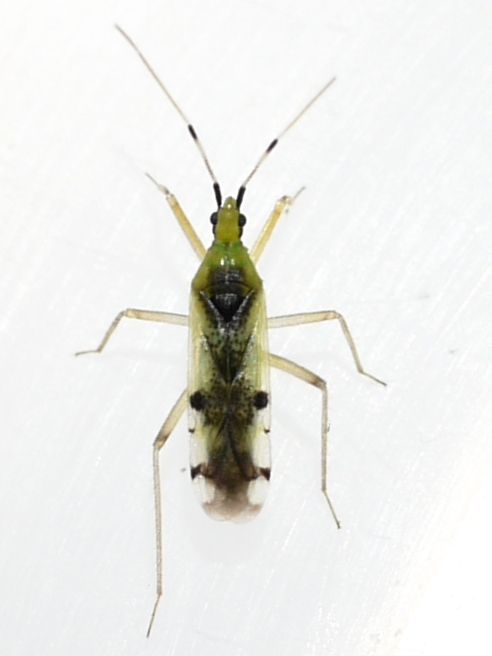
- Macrolophus brevicornis

Scientific classification
- Kingdom: Animalia
- Phylum: Arthropoda
- Clade: Pancrustacea
- Class: Insecta
- Order: Hemiptera
- Suborder: Heteroptera
- Family: Miridae
- Tribe: Dicyphini
- Genus: Macrolophus; Fieber, 1858

Synonyms
- Tylocapsus Van Duzee, 1923

= Macrolophus =

Genus of true bugs

Macrolophus is a genus of plant bugs in the family Miridae. There are at least 20 described species in Macrolophus.

== Species ==
These 28 species belong to the genus Macrolophus:

- Macrolophus aragarsanus Carvalho, 1945^{c g}
- Macrolophus basicornis (Stål, 1860)^{c g}
- Macrolophus brevicornis Knight^{c g b}
- Macrolophus caliginosus Wagner, 1951^{c g}
- Macrolophus costalis Fieber, 1858^{c g}
- Macrolophus crudus (Van Duzee, 1916)^{c g}
- Macrolophus cuiabanus Carvalho, 1945^{c g}
- Macrolophus cuibanus Carvalho^{g}
- Macrolophus diffractus (Van Duzee, 1923)^{c g}
- Macrolophus epilobii V. Putshkov, 1978^{c g}
- Macrolophus ethiopius Cassis, 1986^{c g}
- Macrolophus glaucescens Fieber, 1858^{c g}
- Macrolophus hexaradiatus Carvalho and Carpintero, 1986^{c g}
- Macrolophus innotatus Carvalho, 1968^{c g}
- Macrolophus klotho Linnavuori, 1992^{c g}
- Macrolophus longicornis (Poppius, 1914)^{c}
- Macrolophus lopezi (Van Duzee, 1923)^{i c g}
- Macrolophus melanotoma (A. Costa, 1853)^{c g}
- Macrolophus mimuli Knight, 1968^{i c g}
- Macrolophus pericarti Heiss and Ribes, 1998^{c g}
- Macrolophus praeclarus (Distant, 1884)^{c g}
- Macrolophus punctatus Carvalho, 1968^{c g}
- Macrolophus pygmaeus (Rambur, 1839)^{i c g b}
- Macrolophus rivalis (Knight, 1943)^{c g}
- Macrolophus saileri Carvalho, 1947^{c g}
- Macrolophus separatus (Uhler, 1894)^{i c g b}
- Macrolophus tenuicornis Blatchley, 1926^{i c g b}
- Macrolophus usingeri (Knight, 1943)^{c g}

Data sources: i = ITIS, c = Catalogue of Life, g = GBIF, b = Bugguide.net
