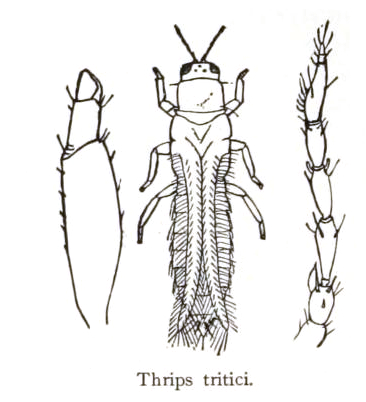

Scientific classification
- Domain: Eukaryota
- Kingdom: Animalia
- Phylum: Arthropoda
- Class: Insecta
- Order: Thysanoptera
- Family: Thripidae
- Genus: Frankliniella
- Species: F. tritici

Binomial name
- Frankliniella tritici (Fitch, 1855)

= Frankliniella tritici =

Species of thrip

Frankliniella tritici, the eastern flower thrips, is a species of thrips (Order Thysanoptera) in the genus Frankliniella. F. tritici inhabits blossom, such as dandelion flowers. They can directly damage plants, grasses and trees, in addition to commercial crops, and as a vector for tospoviruses, a form of plant virus, it particularly affects small fruit production in the United States, including strawberries, grapes, blueberries and blackberries. It can also affect alfalfa, oats, beans and asparagus crops. The species features strap-like wings edged with long hairs, a design which increases aerodynamic efficiency in very small arthropods; the reduced drag means the insect uses less energy. They extract nutrients directly from individual plant cells, and may also digest cells of fungi in the leaf litter.

The genus Frankliniella has 40 species, of which several others are pests - including Frankliniella occidentalis (Western flower thrips), Frankliniella vaccinii (blueberry thrips) and Frankliniella fusca (tobacco thrips).

The 'eastern' part of its common name is due to its common occurrence to the east of the Rocky Mountains, whereas the habitat of western flower thrips extends through the entire United States and Canada.

It is challenging to distinguish the various species of thrips, without resorting to microscopic examination.

Frankliniella tritici can be subject to parasitism by the Thripinema fuscum nematode.

== Frankliniella tritici subsp. bispinosa ==
This subspecies is approximately 0.25 inches (6.4 mm) in length, and is an orange and yellow colour.

It attacks the stamen and young berries of strawberry blossoms in springtime. They extract sap from the fruit and their flowers, which can cause the fruits growth to be stunted, and also leads to discolouration.

They are a migrant species; in springtime, they travel long distances from the South, into the Northeast and Midwest parts of America, borne on high-altitude wind currents.
