= Alphanecrovirus =

Virus classification
- (unranked): Virus
- Realm: Riboviria
- Kingdom: Orthornavirae
- Phylum: Kitrinoviricota
- Class: Tolucaviricetes
- Order: Tolivirales
- Family: Tombusviridae
- Subfamily: Procedovirinae
- Genus: Alphanecrovirus

Genus of viruses

Alphanecrovirus is a genus of viruses in the family Tombusviridae. Plants serve as natural hosts. There are four species in this genus.

== Taxonomy ==
The genus contains the following species, listed by scientific name and followed by their common names:

- Alphanecrovirus nicotianae, Tobacco necrosis virus A
- Alphanecrovirus oleae, Olive latent virus 1
- Alphanecrovirus solani, Potato necrosis virus
- Alphanecrovirus tessellati, Olive mild mosaic virus

== Structure ==
Viruses in Alphanecrovirus are non-enveloped, with icosahedral and spherical geometries, and T=3 symmetry. The diameter is around 28 nm. Genomes are linear, around 4kb in length.

| Genus | Structure | Symmetry | Capsid | Genomic arrangement | Genomic segmentation |
|---|---|---|---|---|---|
| Alphanecrovirus | Icosahedral | T=3 | Non-enveloped | Linear | Monopartite |

== Life cycle ==
Viral replication is cytoplasmic. Entry into the host cell is achieved by penetration into the host cell. Replication follows the positive stranded RNA virus replication model. Positive stranded RNA virus transcription, using the premature termination model of subgenomic RNA transcription is the method of transcription. The virus exits the host cell by tubule-guided viral movement. Plants serve as the natural host. Transmission routes are mechanical, seed borne, and contact.

| Genus | Host details | Tissue tropism | Entry details | Release details | Replication site | Assembly site | Transmission |
|---|---|---|---|---|---|---|---|
| Alphanecrovirus | Plants | None | Viral movement; mechanical inoculation | Viral movement | Cytoplasm | Cytoplasm | Mechanical: contact; seed |
