= Dicyphus hesperus =

Scientific classification
- Kingdom: Animalia
- Phylum: Arthropoda
- Clade: Pancrustacea
- Class: Insecta
- Order: Hemiptera
- Suborder: Heteroptera
- Family: Miridae
- Genus: Dicyphus
- Species: D. hesperus

Binomial name
- Dicyphus hesperus Knight, 1943

Species of true bug

Dicyphus hesperus is a species of true bug in the family Miridae. It is a generalist predator of other insects and also feeds on plant tissues. It is native to North America and has been used there in biological control of agricultural pests, especially whitefly on tomatoes.

== Ecology ==
Dicyphus hesperus is a predator and preys on other insects such as whitefly, aphids, mites and caterpillars. It is used in the biological control of insect pests. However it is not entirely predatory and feeds on plant tissues also. One of its plant hosts is the common mullein (Verbascum thapsus). As an omnivore, it alternates between feeding on plants and on animals, and if deprived of all suitable plant tissue, it will die, even in the presence of whiteflies.

== Use in biological control ==
Generalist predators can be very useful for biological control in tomato crops in enclosed environments, but the introduction of non-indigenous species is risky because of the unknown ecological effects they may have if they escape into the wider environment. For this reason, native species are preferable, and Dicyphus hesperus can fulfil this role in North America in the same way that Macrolophus caliginosus is used in vegetable crops in Europe.

Research has shown that D. hesperus preys on the greenhouse whitefly (Trialeurodes vaporariorum), and the two-spotted spider mite (Tetranychus urticae), both in the laboratory and in a glasshouse planted with tomatoes. When offered both pests it preferentially selects the whitefly. The mirid bug completed its development from egg to adult on either of the two food sources, but it grew faster and was larger at maturity when feeding on the whitefly.

Dicyphus hesperus has also been tested as a biological control for the western flower thrips (Frankliniella occidentalis) on tomatoes. It was effective at reducing the number of thrips but when the ratio of predator to prey was too high (>1:10), some damage was caused to the tomato fruits by D. hesperus.

Dicyphus hesperus feeds on the mullein Verbascum thapsus and to a lesser extent on the eggplant, and can be maintained on these plants in a greenhouse as a preventative measure. As well as controlling greenhouse whitefly and silverleaf whitefly (Bemisia tabaci), it feeds on russet mites (Aceria anthocoptes), predatory mites, aphids and the eggs of moths. It causes some damage to green tomato fruits in the absence of sufficient alternative plant sources of food, but does not cause sufficient harm for the ripe fruit to be down-graded. However, in gerbera crops, the nymphs and adults may feed on the developing flower buds and cause distortion and spoilage of the flowers.
