= Macrolophus tenuicornis =

Scientific classification
- Domain: Eukaryota
- Kingdom: Animalia
- Phylum: Arthropoda
- Class: Insecta
- Order: Hemiptera
- Suborder: Heteroptera
- Family: Miridae
- Tribe: Dicyphini
- Genus: Macrolophus
- Species: M. tenuicornis

Binomial name
- Macrolophus tenuicornis Blatchley, 1926

Species of true bug

Macrolophus tenuicornis is a species of plant bug in the family Miridae. It is found in North America.
