= Frankliniella schultzei =

Common blossom thrips

Scientific classification
- Kingdom: Animalia
- Phylum: Arthropoda
- Clade: Pancrustacea
- Class: Insecta
- Order: Thysanoptera
- Family: Thripidae
- Genus: Frankliniella
- Species: F. schultzei

Binomial name
- Frankliniella schultzei (Trybom, 1910)

Synonyms
- List: Frankliniella interocellaris Karny; Frankliniella sulphurea Schmutz; Frankliniella delicatula Bagnall; Frankliniella dampfi Priesner (1923); Frankliniella dampfi interocellularis Karny (1925); Frankliniella lycopersici Andrewartha (1937); Parafrankliniella nigripes Firault (1928); Frankliniella paucispionosa Moulton (1933); Frankliniella sulphurea Schmutz (1913); Physopus schultzei Trybom (1910); Euthrips gossypii Shiraki (1912); Frankliniella delicatual Bagnall (1919); Frankliniella trybomi Karny (1920); Frankliniella persetosa Karny (1922); Frankliniella tabacicola Karny (1925); Frankliniella africana Bagnall (1926); Frankliniella anglicana Bagnall (1926); Frankliniella aeschyli Girault (1927); Frankliniella kellyana Kelly & Mayne (1934); Frankliniella dampfi nana Priesner (1936); Frankliniella favoniana Priesner (1938); Frankliniella pembertoni Moulton (1940); Frankliniella clitoriae Moulton (1940); Frankliniella schultzei nigra Moulton (1948); Frankliniella ipomoeae Moulton (1948); Frankliniella insularis (Franklin) Morison (1930)

Species of thrip

Frankliniella schultzei, the common blossom thrips or cotton thrips, is a species of thrips in the family Thripidae. It is found in many parts of the world and is an important pest insect in agriculture.

== Description ==
The adult common blossom thrips is a very small insect with a length of between 1 and 1.6 mm (0.04 and 0.06 in). There are two colour morphs, a dark form and a pale form, each occupying part of the range, with forms of both colours being reported from Egypt, India, Kenya, New Guinea, Puerto Rico, Sudan and Uganda. Identification of thrips species is dependent on the colour, the number and arrangement of the bristles on the body and the details of the comb on the eighth abdominal segment.

== Species status ==
Morphological, biological, molecular and ecological data has demonstrated that the dark and light "forms" of F. schultzei in Kenya are two distinct species. Genetic analysis of F. schultzei in Australia shows that there are three highly divergent species of thrips under the taxonomic name "F. schultzei", and potentially at least six different species globally. Frankliniella schultzei is therefore a species complex, this is important in an agricultural pest because the different species in a complex often have different capacities to damage crops, or transmit viruses (which is true for F. schultzei). Each of the species in a pest species complex has to be investigated separately from the others. Species boundaries also define the limits to the spread of insecticide resistance or any genetically controlled traits that are inherited through sexual reproduction. The host relationships and ecology of each of the species within "F. schultzei" also need to be assessed separately before the evolution of this complex can be understood.

== Distribution and host range ==
The common blossom thrips has a worldwide distribution, largely in tropical and subtropical environments, but also in protected environments in temperate locations. In Africa it has been reported from Angola, Botswana, Cape Verde, Chad, Congo, Egypt, Ethiopia, Gambia, Ghana, Kenya, Libya, Madagascar, Mauritius, Morocco, Namibia, Niger, Somalia, South Africa, Sudan, Uganda and Zimbabwe; in Asia from Bangladesh, India, Indonesia, Iran, Iraq, Israel, Java, Malaysia, Pakistan and Sri Lanka; in Europe from Belgium, Netherlands, Spain and the United Kingdom; in North America from Florida, Colorado and Hawaii; in Central America and the Caribbean from Barbados, British Virgin Islands, Cuba, Dominican Republic, Haiti, Jamaica and Puerto Rico. in South America from Argentina, Brazil, Colombia, Chile, Guyana, Paraguay, Peru, Uruguay and Venezuela; and in Australasia from Australia, French Polynesia and Papua New Guinea.

It is a polyphagous species with a wide host range that includes 83 species of plant in 35 different families. In different parts of the world it affects different crops, but these include flowers for cutting, tomato, lettuce, pepper, cucumber, legumes, peanut, spinach, pumpkin, cotton and tobacco.

== Ecology ==
The adult female thrips lays her eggs in the flower tissue of a host plant. At around 25 °C (77 °F), the life cycle takes about twelve days; the eggs hatch after four days, there are two larval stages, followed by a non-feeding prepupal and a pupal stage before the adult emerges. Adults survive for about thirteen days. Unfertilized eggs develop into male offspring while fertilized eggs develop into females. In Australia, aggregations of males have been observed on the flowers of Hibiscus rosa-sinensis and Gossypium hirsutum; these were found to attract females so it seems likely that the males were producing a pheromone.

Besides feeding on plant tissues, the common blossom thrips feeds on pollen grains and on the eggs of mites. The second instar larva consumes more mite eggs than any other stage, and when it supplements its diet in this way, both larval development time and mortality is reduced. Adult female thrips that consume mite eggs increase their fecundity and longevity.

== Damage ==
Both adults and larvae of the common blossom thrips feed on flowers and pollen. The flowers are damaged causing discolouration, distortion and stunting, and may die. Secondary damage is caused by the viruses that can be transmitted between plants. The insect can be a vector of tomato spotted wilt virus, which causes a serious disease of groundnuts and other crops.
