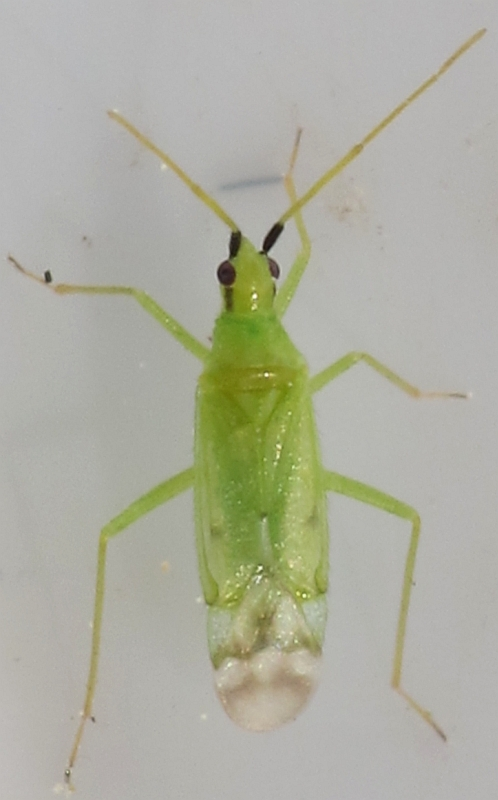

Scientific classification
- Kingdom: Animalia
- Phylum: Arthropoda
- Class: Insecta
- Order: Hemiptera
- Suborder: Heteroptera
- Family: Miridae
- Genus: Macrolophus
- Species: M. pygmaeus

Binomial name
- Macrolophus pygmaeus (Rambur, 1839)

Synonyms
- Macrolophus brevicornis Knight, 1926

= Macrolophus pygmaeus =

Species of true bug

Macrolophus pygmaeus is a species of plant bug in the family Miridae. It is found in Europe except the high north, south to north Africa and east to Asia Minor then to Central Asia. This species is omnivorous, preying on Tuta absoluta eggs and larvae, Ephestia kuehniella eggs, Macrosiphum euphorbiae nymphs, and plants such as Vicia fava. When feeding on plants, M. pygmaeus consumes extrafloral nectar. Its varied diet has created interest in M. pygmaeus as a pest control insect for the prior mentioned species.

== Seismic communication ==
Males use vibrational communication in their courtship process, actively walking down the host plant until a female is found. Macrolophus pygmaeus males produce a vibrational sound called a "yelp" that is associated with male-male interactions. The yelp is also associated with physical contact between the two males, and then the males running away while emitting yelps. The duration of the signal as well can affect the female's response, and it was shown that females typically prefer longer calls.

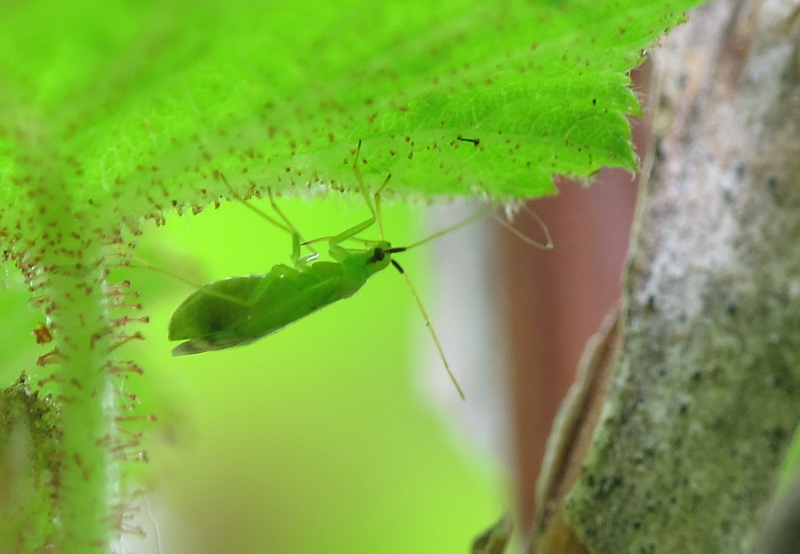
