= Red clover necrotic mosaic virus translation enhancer elements =

3′TE-DR1 translation enhancer element
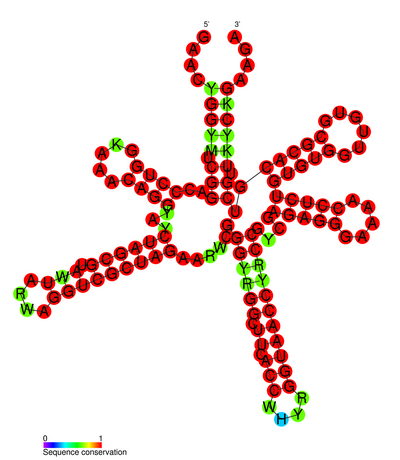
- Predicted secondary structure of the 3′TE-DR1 translation enhancer element of RCNMV

Identifiers
- Symbol: RNA1
- Rfam: RF01453

Other data
- RNA type: Cis-reg
- Domain: Tombusviridae
- PDB structures: PDBe

5′UTR enhancer element
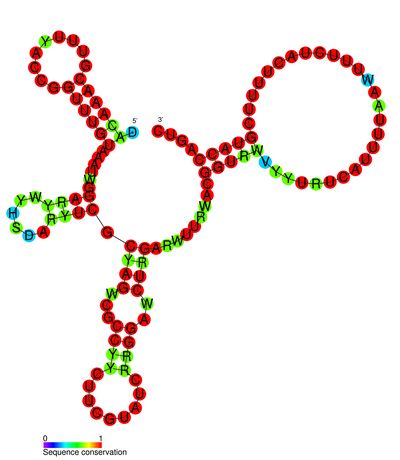
- Predicted secondary structure of the 5′UTR enhancer element of RCNMV

Identifiers
- Symbol: RNA1
- Rfam: RF01454

Other data
- RNA type: Cis-reg
- Domain: Tombusviridae
- PDB structures: PDBe

Red clover necrotic mosaic virus (RCNMV) contains several structural elements present within the 3′ and 5′ untranslated regions (UTR) of the genome that enhance translation. In eukaryotes transcription is a prerequisite for translation. During transcription the pre-mRNA transcript is processes where a 5′ cap is attached onto mRNA and this 5′ cap allows for ribosome assembly onto the mRNA as it acts as a binding site for the eukaryotic initiation factor eIF4F. Once eIF4F is bound to the mRNA this protein complex interacts with the poly(A) binding protein which is present within the 3′ UTR and results in mRNA circularization. This multiprotein-mRNA complex then recruits the ribosome subunits and scans the mRNA until it reaches the start codon. Transcription of viral genomes differs from eukaryotes as viral genomes produce mRNA transcripts that lack a 5’ cap site. Despite lacking a cap site viral genes contain a structural element within the 5’ UTR known as an internal ribosome entry site (IRES). IRES is a structural element that recruits the 40s ribosome subunit to the mRNA within close proximity of the start codon.

RCNMV contains a genome that encodes for two positive sense RNA strands known as RNA1 and RNA2 and both these RNA strands lack a 5’ cap and a 3’ poly (A) tail. RNA1 is required in replication as it encodes for RNA replicase components. This RNA contains structural elements within the 3’ and 5’ UTR that bring about cap independent translation. Unlike RNA1, RNA2 encodes for a movement protein (MP) and the mRNA of RNA2 contains no structural elements within the UTRs that can bring about cap independent translation. The translation of the mRNA of RNA2 is linked with RNA2 replication.

RNA1 contains several structural elements within its untranslated regions (UTRs) which allow for cap independent translation. The 3′ UTR contains a translation enhancer element, 3′TE-DR1 that brings about cap independent translation (a Cap-independent translation element) and is predicted to have 5 stem loop structures. For 3′TE-DR1 to have an effect on translation it was shown that both specific sequences and structures need to be present within the 5′UTR of RNA1. The 5′UTR was shown to contain four stem loop structures where all of these secondary structures contribute to affecting translation efficiently. Stem loop1 has been shown to be the most important secondary structure within the 5′UTR as mutating or removing this stem loop structure significantly decreases translation efficiency and this effect can be overcome by compensatory mutations.

The secondary structures within the 5′UTR was shown to also play a role in RNA stability. Removal of the secondary structure correlated with a decrease in RNA stability. One possibly explanation for this is that the secondary structure may protect the RNA from 5′–3′ exonuclease activity. In RNA1 both structural elements within the 3′ and 5′ UTR are required to translation to occur as the 3′UTR contains the translation enhancer element and the 5′UTR contains structures that aid in recruiting translation factors but also act to increase RNA stability.

The 3′UTR of RNA2 contains a Y-shaped Cap-independent translation element. This structure and several downstream stem-loops are required for synthesis of the negative strand RNA.
