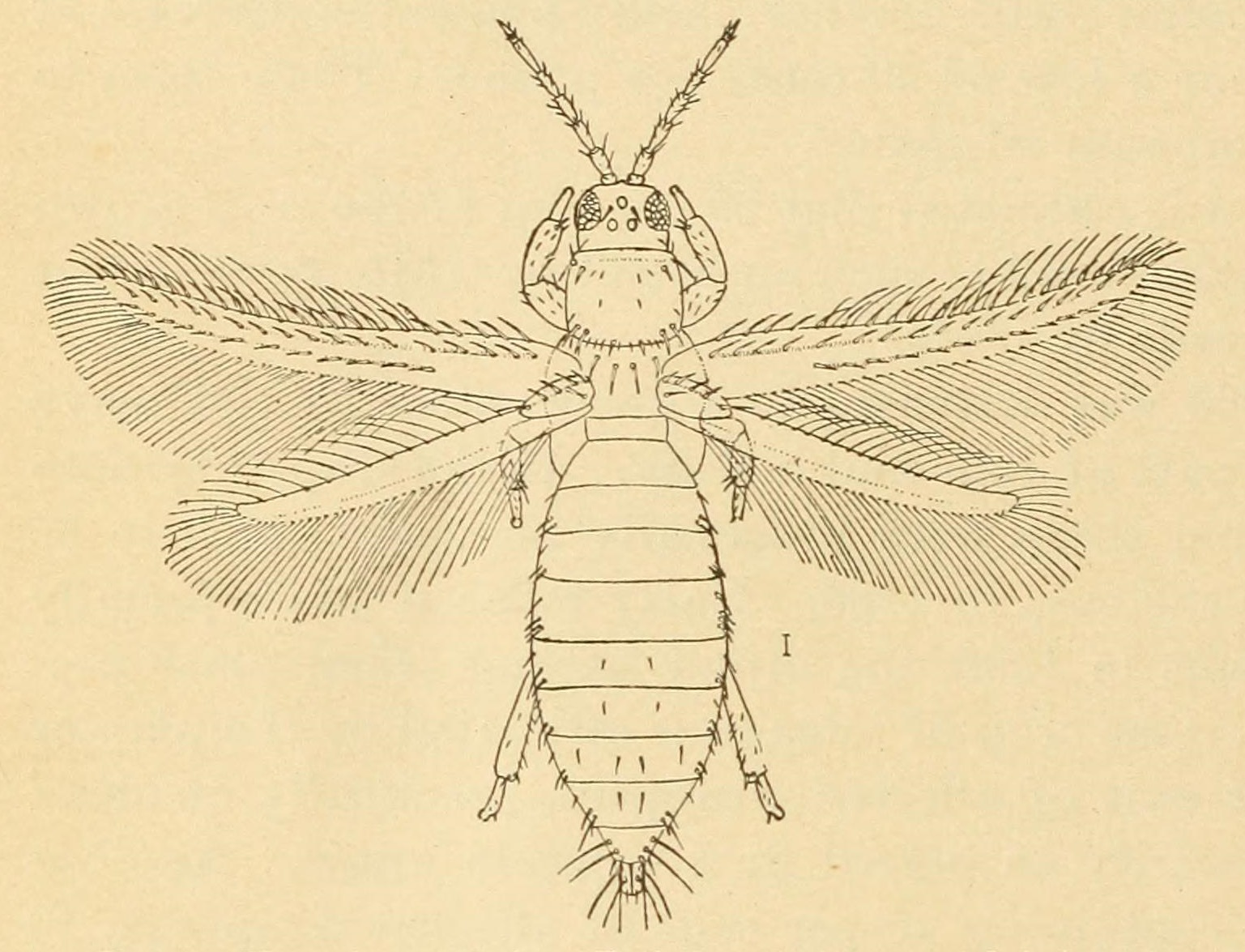
- Frankliniella fusca

Scientific classification
- Kingdom: Animalia
- Phylum: Arthropoda
- Class: Insecta
- Order: Thysanoptera
- Family: Thripidae
- Subfamily: Thripinae
- Genus: Frankliniella; Karny, 1910

= Frankliniella =

Genus of thrips

Frankliniella is a genus of thrips belonging to the family Thripidae.

The genus was first described by Karny in 1910.

The genus has cosmopolitan distribution. Frankliniella species can be quite variable in appearance, making identification challenging.

There are about 230 species in the genus. Species include:

- Frankliniella intonsa (Trybom, 1895)
- Frankliniella lantanae Mound, Nakahara & Day, 2005
- Frankliniella occidentalis (Pergande, 1895)
- Frankliniella schultzei (Trybom, 1910)
- Frankliniella tenuicornis
- Frankliniella tristis
- Frankliniella tritici
- Frankliniella williamsi Hood, 1915
