= Turnip crinkle virus (TCV) core promoter hairpin (Pr) =

RNA element

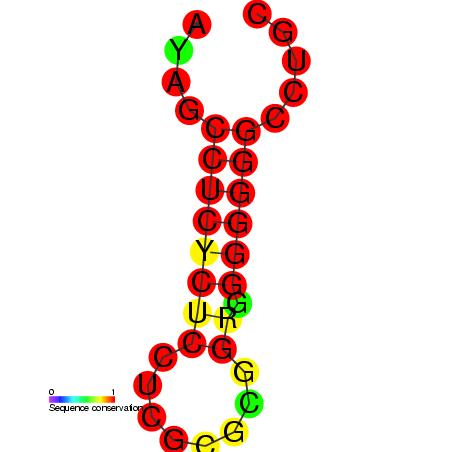
- Predicted secondary structure and sequence conservation of TCV_Pr

Identifiers
- Symbol: TCV_Pr
- Rfam: RF00502

Other data
- RNA type: Cis-reg
- Domain(s): Viruses
- SO: SO:0000233
- PDB structures: PDBe

The turnip crinkle virus (TCV) core promoter hairpin (Pr) is an RNA element located in the 3' UTR of the viral genome that is required for minus strand RNA synthesis.

== See also ==
- Turnip crinkle virus (TCV) repressor of minus strand synthesis H5
