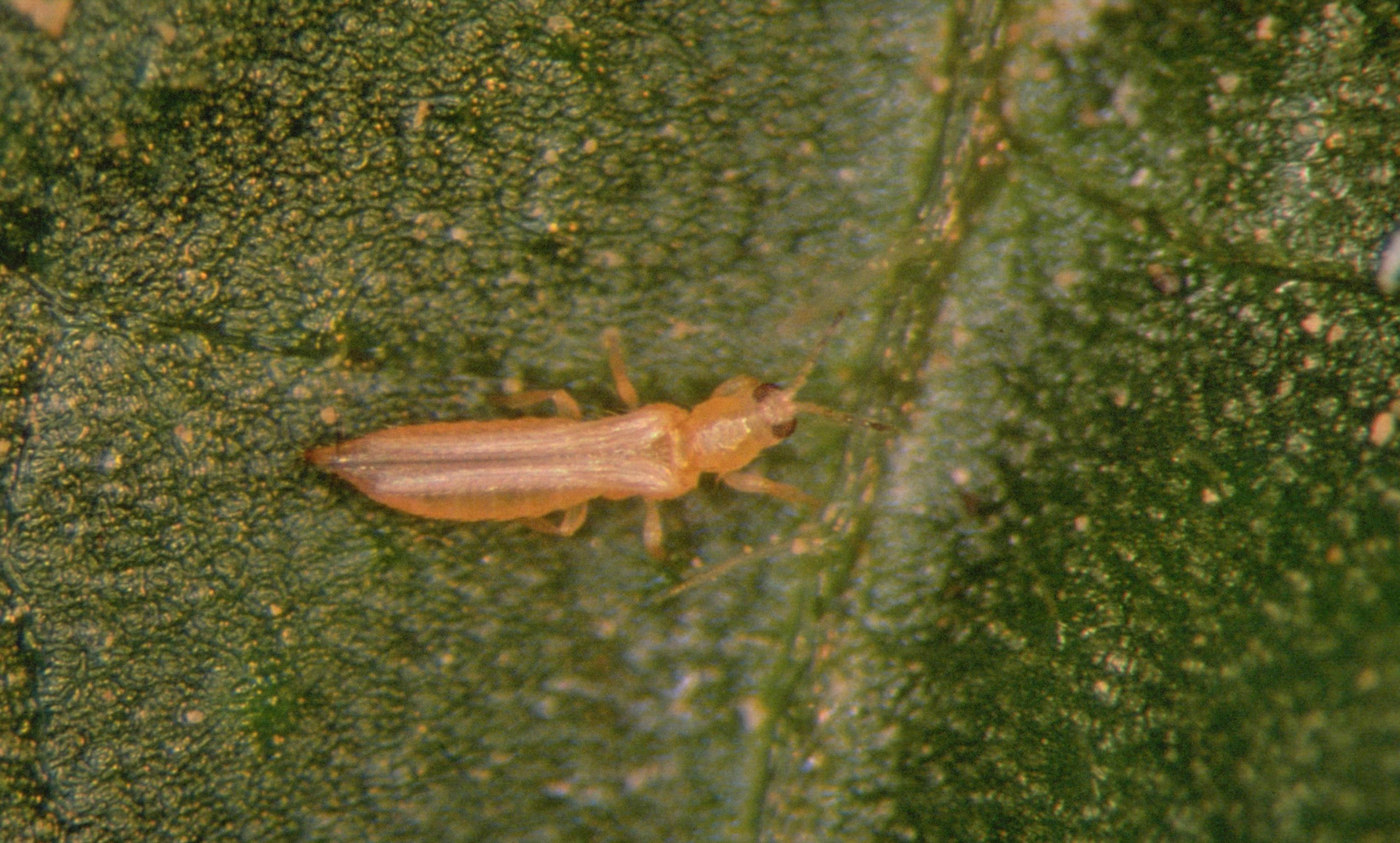

Scientific classification
- Kingdom: Animalia
- Phylum: Arthropoda
- Clade: Pancrustacea
- Class: Insecta
- Order: Thysanoptera
- Family: Thripidae
- Genus: Frankliniella
- Species: F. occidentalis

Binomial name
- Frankliniella occidentalis Pergande, 1895

= Western flower thrips =

Species of insect

The western flower thrips [Frankliniella occidentalis (Pergande)] is an invasive pest insect in agriculture. This species of thrips is native to the Southwestern United States but has spread to other continents, including Europe, Australia (where it was identified in May 1993), and South America via transport of infested plant material.

== Morphology ==
The adult male is about 1 millimetre (3/64 in) long; the female is slightly larger, about 1.4 millimetres (1/16 in) in length. Males are rare, and are always pale yellow, while females vary in color, often by season, from red to yellow to dark brown. Each adult is elongated and thin, with two pairs of long wings. The eggs are oval or kidney-shaped, white, and about 0.2 millimetres (1/128 in) long. The nymph is yellowish in color with red eyes.

== Instars ==
The lifecycle of the western flower thrips varies in length due to temperature, with the adult living from two to five or more weeks, and the nymph stage lasting from five to 20 days. Each female may lay 40 to over 100 eggs in the tissues of the plant, often in the flower, but also in the fruit or foliage. The newly hatched nymph feeds on the plant for two of its instars, then falls off the plant to complete its other two instar stages. Nymphs feed heavily on new fruit just beginning to develop from the flower.

== Behavioral ==
Flower-feeding thrips are routinely attracted to bright floral colors, especially white, blue, and yellow, and will land and attempt to feed. Some flower thrips will "bite" humans wearing clothing with such bright colors, though no species feed on blood. Such biting does not result in any known disease transmission, but skin irritation is known to occur.

== Reproduction ==
Most western flower thrips are female and reproduce by arrhenotokous parthenogenesis; i.e. females can produce males from unfertilized eggs, but females arise only from fertilized eggs.

== Hosts ==
It has been documented to feed on over 500 different species of host plants, including a large number of fruit, vegetable, and ornamental crops including Brassica oleracea (broccoli, 'Marathon'). The insect damages the plant in several ways. The major damage is caused by the adult ovipositing in the plant tissue. The plant is also injured by feeding, which leaves holes and areas of silvery discoloration when the plant reacts to the insect's saliva. Nymphs feed heavily on new fruit just beginning to develop from the flower. The western flower thrips is also the major vector of tomato spotted wilt virus (TSWV), a serious plant disease. It has been shown that acquiring TSWV (which only occurs during the larval stages) causes more feeding in the thrips which results in a longer life span eventually. Western flower thrips are a year-round pest, but are less destructive during wet weather.

== Management ==
=== Trapping ===
WFTs especially like the color blue, being attracted to blue card material and even more so to blue lights. They are somewhat interested in yellow and barely interested in white. Traps can still function even if surrounded with mesh to exclude beneficials such as hoverflies and bees. Commercial semiochemical pheromone lures are also available which can be used in conjunction with blue sticky traps to maximise sticky trap catches of western flower thrips.

=== Biological controls ===
Damage can be reduced by growing barriers of nonhost plants around crops and by eliminating reservoir plants, plants to which the thrips are especially attracted, such as jimson weed. The thrips' natural enemies include pirate bugs of genus Orius and Neoseiulus cucumeris, a predatory mite species which is the most commonly used biological control agent against western flower thrips in protected crops including cucumber and strawberry. Other agents show promise as biological pest control, including the entomopathogenic fungi Metarhizium robertsii (syn. M. anisopliae) and Beauveria bassiana, and the mirid Dicyphus hesperus.

== Genetics ==
A draft genome assembly is available.
