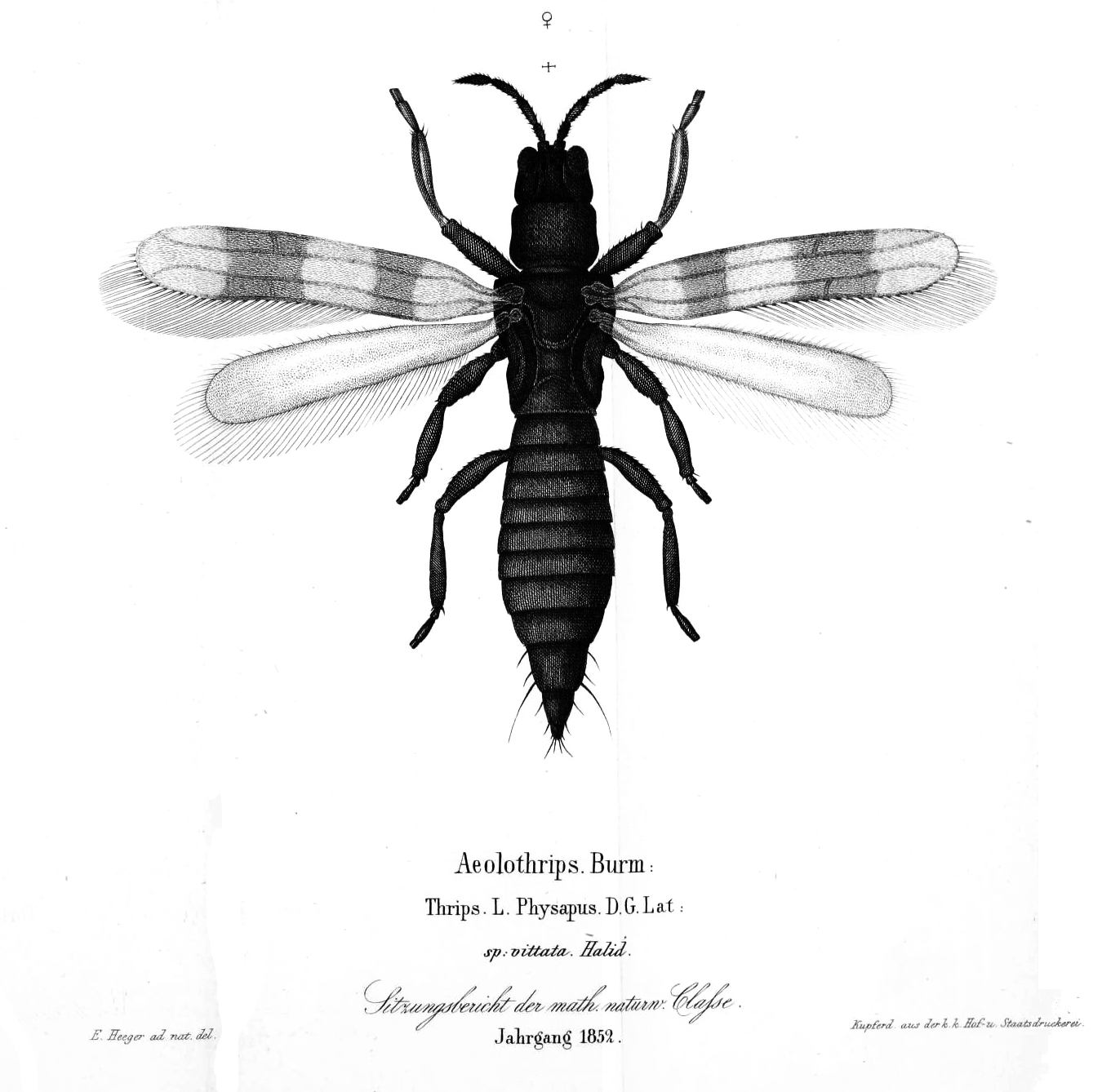

Scientific classification
- Domain: Eukaryota
- Kingdom: Animalia
- Phylum: Arthropoda
- Class: Insecta
- Order: Thysanoptera
- Suborder: Terebrantia
- Family: Aeolothripidae; Uzel, 1895

Genera
- Aeolothrips; Desmothrips; Franklinothrips others, see text

Diversity
- 24 recent genera (5 fossil), ca. 200 species

= Aeolothripidae =

Family of thrips

The Aeolothripidae are a family of thrips. They are particularly common in the holarctic region, although several occur in the drier parts of the subtropics, including dozens in Australia. Adults and larvae are usually found in flowers, but they pupate on the ground. While they normally prey on other arthropods, many feed also on flowers.

Species of the genus Aeolothrips, which contains about half of all species in this family, mostly live on flowers, although a few species live at ground level as obligate predators of mites. Those that live on flowers are normally facultative predators. Aeolothrips intermedius requires floral proteins in its diet in addition to its regular prey of thrips larvae to breed successfully.

Franklinothrips is a pantropical genus of ant-mimicking predators.

== Genera ==
- Aduncothrips Ananthakrishnan, 1963 (one species, A. asiaticus)
- Aeolothrips Haliday, 1836 (95 species, holarctic)
- Allelothrips Bagnall, 1932 (seven species)
- Andrewarthaia Mound, 1967 (one species, A. kellyana)
- Audiothrips Moulton, 1930 (two species)
- Corynothripoides Bagnall, 1926 (1 species, C. marginipennis)
- †Cretothrips Grimaldi, 2004 (one fossil species, C. antiquus)
- Cycadothrips Mound, 1991 (three species)
- Dactuliothrips Moulton, 1931 (six species)
- Desmidothrips Mound, 1977 (two species)
- Desmothrips Hood, 1915 (14 species, Australia)
- Erythridothrips Mound & Marullo, 1993 (one species, E. cubilis)
- Erythrothrips Moulton, 1911 (12 species, western North and South America)
- Euceratothrips Hood, 1936 (one species, E. marginipennis)
- Franklinothrips Back, 1912 (14 species, pantropical)
- Gelothrips Bhatti, 1967 (three species)
- Indothrips Bhatti, 1967 (one species, I. bhushani)
- Lamprothrips Moulton, 1935 (one species, L. miltoni)
- †Liassothrips Priesner, 1949 (one fossil species, L. crassipes)
- †Lithadothrips Scudder, 1875 (one fossil species, L. vetustus)
- Mymarothrips Bagnall, 1928 (three species)
- Orothrips Moulton, 1907 (three species)
- †Palaeothrips Scudder, 1875 (one fossil species, P. fossilis)
- †Permothrips Martynov, 1935 (one fossil species, P. longipennis)
- Rhipidothripiella Bagnall, 1932 (one species, R. turneri)
- Rhipidothripoides Bagnall, 1923 (two species)
- Rhipidothrips Uzel, 1895 (six species)
- Stomatothrips Hood, 1912 (eight species)
- Streothrips Bhatti, 1971 (two species)
