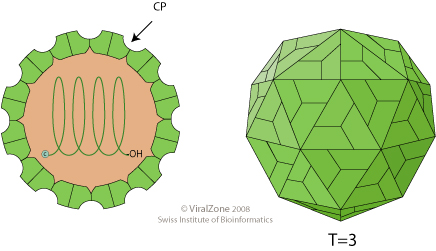

Virus classification
- (unranked): Virus
- Realm: Riboviria
- Kingdom: Orthornavirae
- Phylum: Kitrinoviricota
- Class: Tolucaviricetes
- Order: Tolivirales
- Family: Tombusviridae

= Tombusviridae =

Family of viruses

Tombusviridae is a family of single-stranded positive sense RNA plant viruses. The family contains 19 genera in 3 subfamilies. The name is derived from Tomato bushy stunt virus (TBSV).

== Genome ==
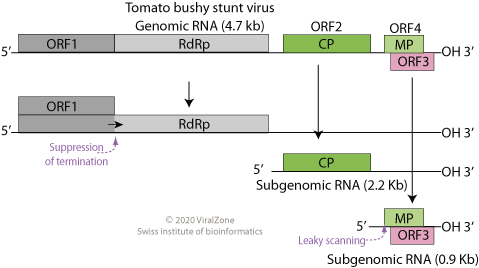
Tombusviridae genome map

All viruses in the family have a non-segmented (monopartite) linear genome, with the exception of Dianthoviruses, whose genome is bipartite. The genome is approximately 4.6–4.8kb in length, lacks a 5' cap and a poly(A) tail, and it encodes 4–6 ORFs. The polymerase encodes an amber stop codon which is the site of a readthrough event within ORF1, producing two products necessary for replication. There is no helicase encoded by the virus.

== Structure ==
The RNA is encapsulated in an icosahedral (T=3) capsid, composed of 180 units of a single coat protein 27–42K in size; the virion measures 28–35 nm in diameter, and it is not enveloped.

== Life cycle ==
Viral replication is cytoplasmic, and is lysogenic. Entry into the host cell is achieved by penetration into the host cell. Replication follows the positive stranded RNA virus replication model. Positive stranded RNA virus transcription, using the premature termination model of subgenomic RNA transcription is the method of transcription. Translation takes place by leaky scanning, −1 ribosomal frameshifting, viral initiation, and suppression of termination. The virus exits the host cell by tubule-guided viral movement. Plants serve as the natural host. Transmission routes are mechanical, seed borne, and contact.

Viruses in this family are primarily soil-borne, some transmitted by fungal species of the order Chytridiales, others by no known vector. Virions may spread by water, root growth into infected soil, contact between plants, pollen, or seed, depending on the virus species. These viruses may be successfully transmitted by grafting or mechanical inoculation, and both the virion and the genetic material alone are infective.

== Replication ==
Members of Tombusviridae replicate in the cytoplasm, by use of negative strand templates. The replication process leaves a surplus of positive sense (+)RNA strands, and it is thought that not only does the viral RNA act as a template for replication, but is also able to manipulate and regulate RNA synthesis.

The level of RNA synthesis has been shown to be affected by the cis-acting properties of certain elements on the RNA (such as RNA1 and 2), which include core promoter sequences which regulate the site of initiation for the complementary RNA strand synthesis. This mechanism is thought to be recognised by RNA-dependent RNA polymerase, found encoded within the genome.

Viruses in Tombusviridae have been found to co-opt GAPDH, a host metabolic enzyme, for use in the replication center. GAPDH may bind to the (−)RNA strand and keep it in the replicase complex, allowing (+)RNA strands synthesized from it to be exported and accumulate in the host cell. Downregulation of GAPDH reduced viral RNA accumulation, and eliminated the surplus of (+)RNA copies.

== Notes ==
Research has shown that infection of plants from tombusviruses contain defective interfering RNAs that are born directly from the viruses RNA genome, and no host genome. Viral DI RNAs with their small size and cis-acting elements are good templates both in vivo and in vitro on which to study RNA replication.

Sub-genomic RNA is used in the synthesis of some proteins; they are generated by premature termination of (−)strand synthesis. sgRNAs and sgRNA negative-sense templates are found in infected cells.

== Taxonomy ==
The family contains the following subfamilies and genera (-virinae denotes subfamily and -virus denotes genus):

- Calvusvirinae
  - Umbravirus
- Procedovirinae
  - Alphacarmovirus
  - Alphanecrovirus
  - Aureusvirus
  - Avenavirus
  - Betacarmovirus
  - Betanecrovirus
  - Gallantivirus
  - Gammacarmovirus

- Macanavirus
- Machlomovirus
- Panicovirus
- Pelarspovirus
- Rimosavirus
- Tombusvirus
- Tralespevirus
- Zeavirus

- Regressovirinae
  - Dianthovirus
  - Luteovirus
