= Tolivirales =

Virus classification
- (unranked): Virus
- Realm: Riboviria
- Kingdom: Orthornavirae
- Phylum: Kitrinoviricota
- Class: Tolucaviricetes
- Order: Tolivirales

Order of viruses

Tolivirales is an order of RNA viruses which infect insects and plants. Member viruses have a positive-sense single-stranded RNA genome. The virions are non-enveloped, spherical, and have an icosahedral capsid. The name of the group is a syllabic abbreviation of "tombusvirus-like" with the suffix -virales indicating a virus order.

== Taxonomy ==
The following families are recognized:

- Ambiguiviridae
- Carmotetraviridae
- Tombusviridae
