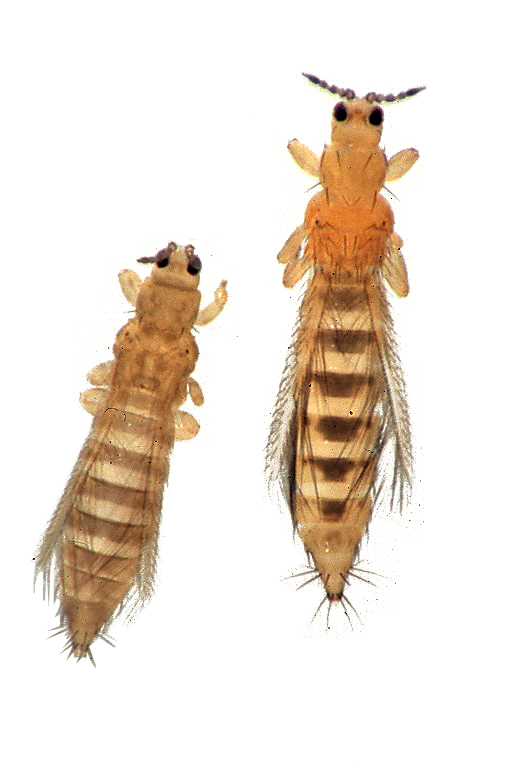
- Adult onion thrips (Thrips tabaci, left) and tobacco thrips (Frankliniella fusca, right)

Scientific classification
- Kingdom: Animalia
- Phylum: Arthropoda
- Clade: Pancrustacea
- Class: Insecta
- Order: Thysanoptera
- Family: Thripidae
- Subfamily: Thripinae; Stevens, 1829

Genera
- About 150

= Thripinae =

Subfamily of thrips

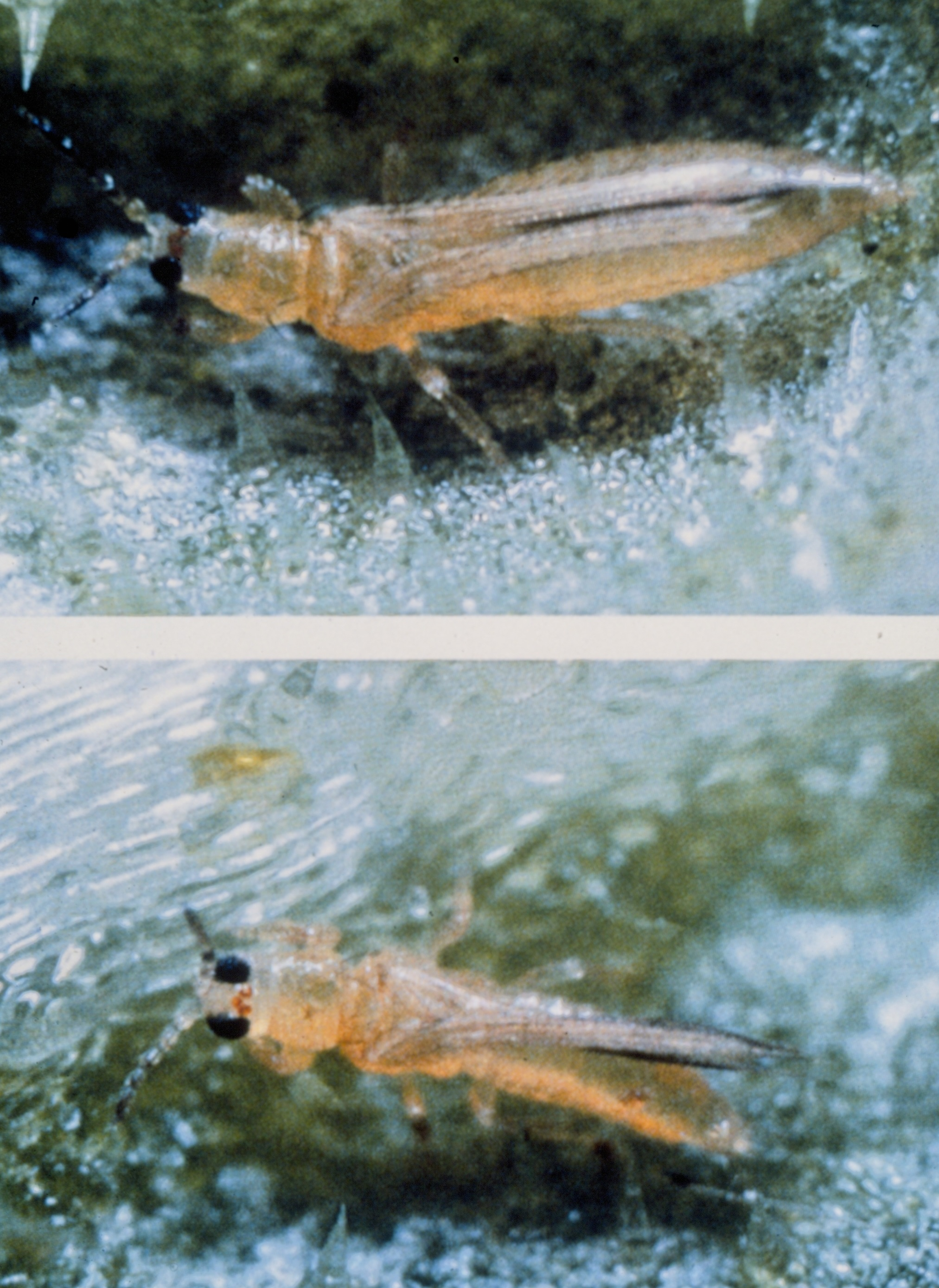
Thrips palmi

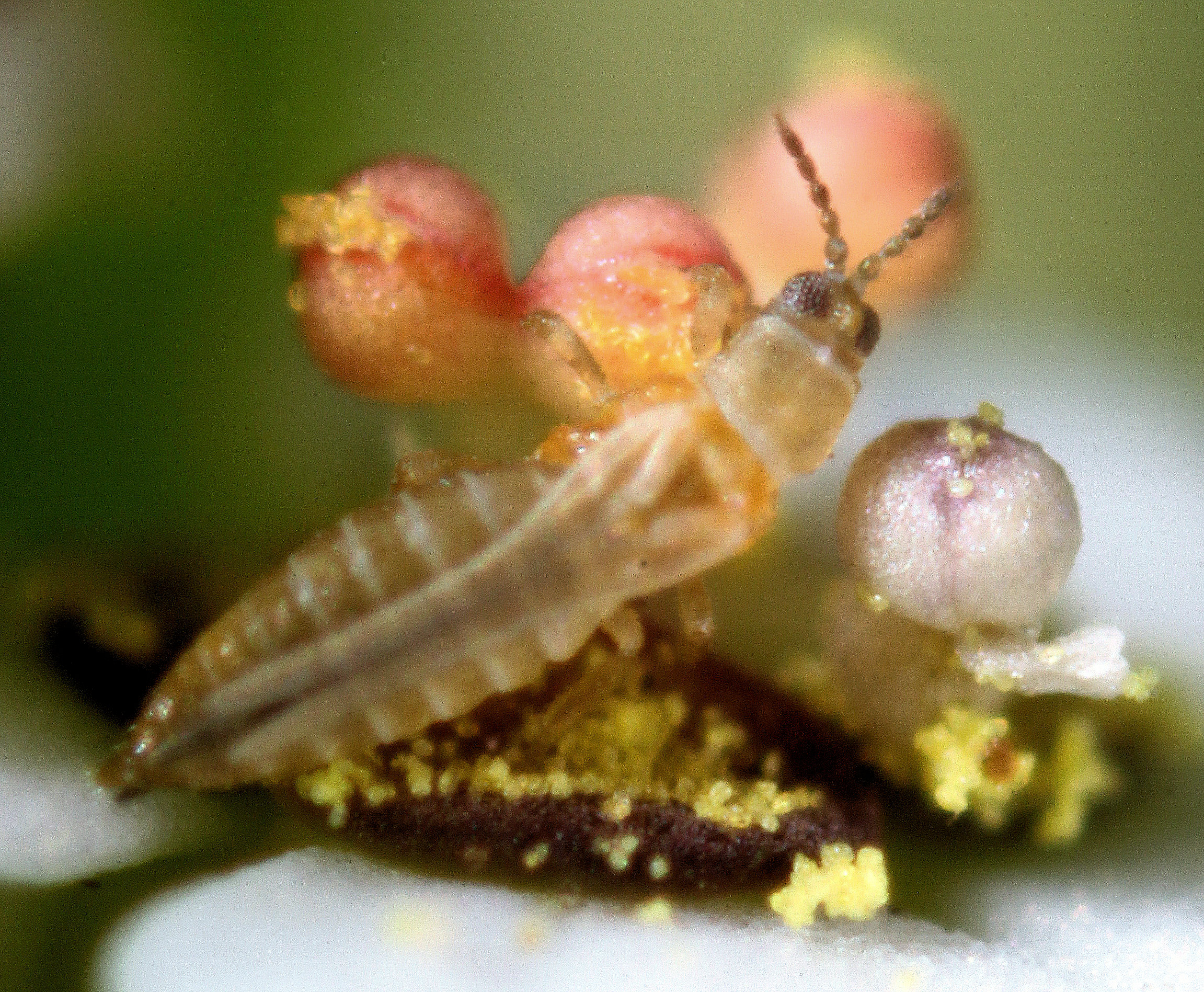
Frankliniella occidentalis

The Thripinae are a subfamily of thrips, insects of the order Thysanoptera. The Thripinae belong to the common thrips family Thripidae and include around 1,400 species in 150 genera. A 2012 molecular phylogeny found that the Thripinae was paraphyletic; further work will be needed to clarify the relationships within the group.

Notable members – some of them economically significant pests – are for example Anaphothrips susanensis, Megalurothrips distalis, Sciothrips caramomi, Scirtothrips dorsalis (chili thrips), Sorghothrips jonnaphilus, T. hawaiiensis, T. palmi (melon thrips) and T. tabaci (onion thrips).

The subfamily includes many pests, some of them invasive species. The chili thrips, Scirtothrips dorsalis, is an Asian pest on many crops, including chili peppers, roses, strawberry, tea, ground nuts, and castor bean. The western flower thrips, Frankliniella occidentalis, has recently expanded its range from western North America to large portions of Europe and Asia through the trade of greenhouse plants.

== Selected species ==
- Anaphothrips susanensis
- Frankliniella bispinosa – Florida flower thrips
- Frankliniella fusca – tobacco thrips
- Frankliniella occidentalis – western flower thrips
- Frankliniella robusta
- Frankliniella schultzei – common blossom thrips
- Kakothrips pisivorus - pea thrips
- Limothrips denticornis – rye thrips
- Limothrips pecerealium – grain thrips
- Megalurothrips distalis
- Scirtothrips dorsalis – chili thrips, yellow tea thrips
- Scirtothrips perseae – avocado thrips
- Sorghothrips jonnaphilus
- Sciothrips caramomi
- Stenchaetothrips - rice thrips
- Taeniothrips inconsequens – pear thrips
- Thrips angusticeps
- Thrips atratus Haliday, 1836
- Thrips hawaiiensis
- Thrips meridionalis – pea thrips
- Thrips montanus Priesner, 1920 (sometimes in T. atratus)
- Thrips palmi – melon thrips
- Thrips tabaci – onion thrips

== Genera ==
The following genera belong to the subfamily Thripinae:

1. Anaphothrips Uzel, 1895^{i c g}
2. Anascirtothrips Bhatti, 1961^{i c g}
3. Apterothrips Bagnall, 1908^{i c g}
4. Aptinothrips Haliday, 1836^{i c g}
5. Arorathrips Bhatti, 1990^{i c g b}
6. Arpediothrips Hood, 1927^{i c g}
7. Asprothrips J. C. Crawford, 1938^{i c g}
8. Aurantothrips Bhatti, 1978^{i c g}
9. Baileyothrips Kono and O'Neill, 1964^{i c g}
10. Baliothrips Uzel, 1895^{i c g}
11. Belothrips Haliday, 1836^{i c g}
12. Bolacothrips Uzel, 1895^{i c g}
13. Bravothrips Johansen, 1966^{i c g}
14. Bregmatothrips Hood, 1912^{i c g}
15. Caprithrips Faure, 1933^{i c g}
16. Catinathrips O'Neill, 1967^{i c g}
17. Ceratothripoides Bagnall, 1918^{i c g}
18. Ceratothrips Reuter, 1899^{i c g}
19. Chaetanaphothrips Priesner, 1925^{i c g}
20. Chaetisothrips Priesner, 1957^{i c g}
21. Chilothrips Hood, 1916^{i c g}
22. Chirothrips Haliday, 1836^{i c g}
23. Ctenothrips Franklin, 1907^{i c g b}
24. Danothrips Bhatti, 1971^{i c g}
25. Dendrothripoides Bagnall, 1923^{i c g}
26. Dendrothrips Uzel, 1895^{i c g}
27. Dichromothrips Priesner, 1932^{i c g}
28. Drepanothrips Uzel, 1895^{i c g}
29. Echinothrips Moulton, 1911^{i c g b}
30. Eremiothrips Priesner, 1950^{g}
31. Ethirothrips Karny, 1925^{i c g}
32. Ewartithrips Nakahara, 1995^{i c g}
33. Firmothrips Schliephake, 1972^{i c g}
34. Frankliniella Karny, 1910^{i c g b}
35. Glaucothrips Karny, 1921^{i c g}
36. Hemianaphothrips Priesner, 1925^{i c g}
37. Iridothrips Priesner, 1940^{i c g}
38. Kakothrips Williams, 1914^{c}
39. Kurtomathrips Moulton, 1927^{i c g}
40. Leucothrips Reuter, 1904^{i c g}
41. Limothrips Haliday, 1836^{i c g}
42. Megalurothrips Bagnall, 1915^{i c g b}
43. Microcephalothrips Bagnall, 1926^{i c g}
44. Mycterothrips Trybom, 1910^{i c g}
45. Neohydatothrips John, 1929^{i c g}
46. Nesothrips Kirkaldy, 1907^{i c g}
47. Odontoanaphothrips Moulton, 1926^{i c g}
48. Odontothrips Amyot and Serville, 1843^{i c g}
49. Organothrips Hood, 1940^{i c g}
50. Oxythrips Uzel, 1895^{i c g}
51. Palmiothrips zur Strassen, 1965^{i c g}
52. Pezothrips Karny, 1907^{i c g}
53. Plesiothrips Hood, 1915^{i c g}
54. Proscirtothrips Karny, 1921^{i c g}
55. Prosopoanaphothrips Moulton, 1926^{i c g}
56. Prosopothrips Uzel, 1895^{i c g}
57. Pseudanaphothrips Karny, 1921^{i c g}
58. Pseudothrips Hinds, 1902^{i c g}
59. Psilothrips Hood, 1927^{i c g b}
60. Psydrothrips Palmer and Mound, 1985^{i c g}
61. Rhamphothrips Karny, 1913^{i c g}
62. Rhaphidothrips Uzel, 1895^{i c g}
63. Rhipiphorothrips Morgan, 1913^{i c g}
64. Salpingothrips Hood, 1935^{i c g b}
65. Scirtothrips Shull, 1909^{i c g b}
66. Scolothrips Hinds, 1902^{i c g b}
67. Sericopsothrips Hood, 1936^{i c g}
68. Sericothrips Haliday, 1836^{i c g}
69. Stenchaetothrips Bagnall, 1926
70. Synaptothrips Trybom, 1910^{i c g}
71. Taeniothrips Amyot and Serville, 1843^{i c g}
72. Tameothrips Bhatti, 1978^{i c g}
73. Tenothrips Bhatti, 1967^{i c g}
74. Thrips Linnaeus, 1758^{i c g b}
75. Tmetothrips Amyot and Serville, 1843^{i c g}
76. Toxonothrips Moulton, 1927^{i c g}
77. Trichromothrips Priesner, 1930^{i c g}
78. Xerothrips Nakahara, 1996^{i c g}
79. Zonothrips Priesner, 1926^{i c g}

Data sources: i=ITIS, c=Catalogue of Life, g=GBIF, b=Bugguide.net
