= Eremiothrips =

Scientific classification
- Kingdom: Animalia
- Phylum: Arthropoda
- Clade: Pancrustacea
- Class: Insecta
- Order: Thysanoptera
- Family: Thripidae
- Subfamily: Thripinae
- Genus: Eremiothrips; Priesner, 1950

Species
- See text

Synonyms
- Antilopothrips Priesner, 1965; Ascirtothrips Priesner, 1965

Genus of thrips

Eremiothrips is a genus of thrips that belongs to the subfamily Thripinae. This species can be found in xeric and desert-like environments of North Africa (Sahara Desert) and the Arabian Peninsula with some being found in the northern Mediterranean, India and China.

The genus is delicate and small with males being smaller than females. They usually have a pale coloration. Due to males having a smaller size and being rarer, they are often overlooked.

== Distribution ==
Members of this genus can be found in Morocco with their range stretching through the Sahara Desert and into the Arabian Peninsula and Iran. A few species have been recorded in the northern Mediterranean regions, India and China. There are around nine species that have been recorded in Saudi Arabia and the Arabian Peninsula.

It is a eremophilous genus that often associated with xeric or desert-like environments. They inhabit regions with hyper-arid climates such as the Sahara Desert and the Empty Quarter (Rub' al Khali) of the Arabian Peninsula.

== Ecology ==
=== Feeding ===
All species are presumably phytophagous feeding on flowers and leaves. There seems to be no host association in this genus.

=== Pests ===
There has been no evidence for any species of this genus being pests and having adverse affects on crops.

There has been documented instances of damage being done to Sarcocornia fruticosa by both immature and adults of Eremiothrips negevi. These instances are claimed to cause damage that are similar to the typical injury seen on chives (Allium schoenoprasum) caused by the pest tobacco thrips (Thrips tabaci). An author of the paper that recorded this instance of damage caused by Eremiothrips negevi species done a research visit from Selçuk University in Konya, Türkiye to the Senckenberg Museum in Frankfurt, Germany. The research visit was part of a postdoctoral project on Eremiothrips species where she would find no morphological differences between the two species.

== Taxonomy ==
The genus is classed within the family Thripidae and more specifically within the subfamily Thripinae. It is considered to be a member of the Anaphothrips genus group.

=== Species ===
Below is a incomplete list of species within the genus:

1. Eremiothrips acutus (Bhatti, 1972)
2. Eremiothrips aldryhimi Rasool, Abdel-Dayem, Alattal & Aldhafer, 2021
3. Eremiothrips antilope (Priesner, 1923)
4. Eremiothrips arya (zur Strassen, 1975)
5. Eremiothrips bhattii Minaei, 2012
6. Eremiothrips brunneus (zur Strassen, 1975)
7. Eremiothrips dorcas (zur Strassen, 1975)
8. Eremiothrips dubius (Priesner, 1933)
9. Eremiothrips efflatouni (Priesner, 1965)
10. Eremiothrips eshghii Minaei, 2014
11. Eremiothrips farsi Bhatti & Telmadarraiy, 2003
12. Eremiothrips hanshanensis Zhang & Feng, 2017
13. Eremiothrips hudeci (Pelikan, 2002)
14. Eremiothrips imitator Priesner, 1950
15. Eremiothrips negevi Ben-David, 2017
16. Eremiothrips brunneus (zur Strassen, 1975)
17. Eremiothrips manolachei (Knechtel, 1955)
18. Eremiothrips shirabudinensis (Yakhontov, 1929)
19. Eremiothrips similis Bhatti, 1988
20. Eremiothrips taghizadehi (zur Strassen, 1975)
21. Eremiothrips tamaricis (zur Strassen, 1975)
22. Eremiothrips tetraenae Rasool & Aldhafer, 2026
23. Eremiothrips unicolour Rasool, Abdel-Dayem, Alattal & Aldhafer, 2021
24. Eremiothrips varius (Bhatti, 1967)
25. Eremiothrips xerophilus Rasool & Aldhafer, 2026
26. Eremiothrips zurstrasseni Bhatti Bagheri & Ramezani, 2009
