= Stenchaetothrips biformis =

Scientific classification
- Kingdom: Animalia
- Phylum: Arthropoda
- Clade: Pancrustacea
- Class: Insecta
- Order: Thysanoptera
- Family: Thripidae
- Subfamily: Thripinae
- Genus: Stenchaetothrips
- Species: S. biformis

Binomial name
- Stenchaetothrips biformis (Bagnall, 1913)

Synonyms
- Bagnallia adusta Bagnall, 1913; Bagnallia biformis Bagnall, 1913; Bagnallia melanurus Bagnall, 1913; Baliothrips biformis (Bagnall); Chloethrips blandus Strassen, 1975; Thrips dobrogensis Knechtel, 1964; Thrips holorphnus Karny, 1925; Thrips oryzae Williams, 1916

Species of thrips

Stenchaetothrips biformis is a species of thrips sometimes called the "rice thrips", a crop pest, is often described in the literature under the synonyms Baliothrips biformis and Thrips oryzae.

== Description ==
Adults are minute (about 1mm) with 7 segmented antennae; eggs (0.25 x 0.1 mm) are laid singly in leaves; nymphs are white or pale yellow.

== Pest status ==
S. biformis is a pest of sorghum in India and Asian rice: especially during dry weather. Young seedlings are especially subject to damage: with a high rate of reproduction, this pest may cause serious damage.
