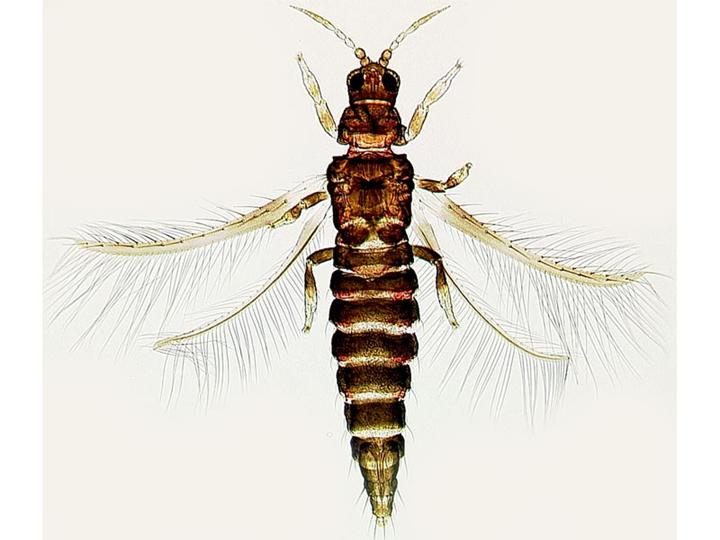

Scientific classification
- Kingdom: Animalia
- Phylum: Arthropoda
- Clade: Pancrustacea
- Class: Insecta
- Order: Thysanoptera
- Family: Thripidae
- Genus: Echinothrips
- Species: E. americanus

Binomial name
- Echinothrips americanus Morgan, 1913

= Echinothrips americanus =

Species of thrip

Echinothrips americanus is a species of thrips (the taxonomic order Thysanoptera) in the family Thripidae. It is found in North America, Europe, and Asia. E. americanus was first described in 1913 by entomologist A.C. Morgan in Quincy, Florida, where he found the insect on a Veratrum viride plant (common name green false-hellebore). Suggested common names include Poinsettia thrips and Impatiens thrips. Since their spread throughout Europe as early as 1995, and subsequently China, E. americanus has been called an "upcoming pest."

== Etymology ==
Insects belonging to the order Thysanoptera were named thrips meaning "woodworm," by Carl Linnaeus.

== Physical appearance ==
Thrips, including E. americanus, are usually no longer than 1mm. Individual E. americanus are generally brown or black. A.C. Morgan provides a detailed description of several individuals in his publication declaring his discovery of the species. Males are generally smaller, thinner, and lighter in colour than females. Morgan described E. americanus as having a red hypodermal pigmentation. Prepupae are white in colour. Thrips are known for their asymmetrical mouthparts that distinguish them from other orders. They are also known for their fringed wings. Adult E. americanus have moniliform antennae and the body size differences between males and females corresponds with antennae length and size differences.

== Distribution ==
As its name suggests, E. americanus is native to the United States. E. americanus has been documented in the following countries: China, Indonesia, Japan, Taiwan, Thailand, Austria, Belgium, Bulgaria, Croatia, Czechia, Finland, France, Germany, Hungary, Ireland, Italy, Netherlands, Norway, Poland, Russia, Serbia, Slovakia, Slovenia, Spain, Sweden, United Kingdom, Bermuda, Canada, Guadeloupe, Mexico, Puerto Rico, and Australia. An unconfirmed observation of E. americanus was made in Denmark.

E. americanus has been recorded in 10 U.S. states (Florida, Georgia, Hawaii, Illinois, Iowa, Maryland, Missouri, New York, Tennessee, and Virginia) as well as the District of Columbia.

E. americanus is known to occur in British Columbia as well as Ontario.

== Lifecycle ==
Most species of thrips have a haplo-diploid reproductive mode and reproduce via arrhenotoky (a form of parthenogenesis). Kreuger et al. (2015) report the mean lifespan of E. americanus to be 10 – 14 days. As a member of the suborder Terebrantia, E. americanus has two larval instars (developmental stages) as well as two pupal instars.

== Habitat and diet ==
E. americanus' are leaf dwelling thrips, feeding on both the upper and lower surfaces of leaves (but more commonly on the lower surface). They are highly polyphagous and cause severe damage to foliage that they feed on. As opposed to other species of thrips like the western flower thrip (Frankliniella occidentalis) or tobacco thrips (Thrips tabaci) that pupate in the soil, E. americanus pupates on the aboveground parts of plants. Using their mouthparts to puncture the leaf surface, E. americanus will leave plants with a chlorotic and shrunken appearance. Particulate excreta or frass left on the leaf surface as well as eggs laid in plant tissues are serious threats to the economic value of many ornamental and crop plants. E. americanus is known to feed on about 24 different families of plants.

== Lifecycle and reproduction ==
Most species of thrips have a haplo-diploid reproductive mode and reproduce via arrhenotoky (a form of parthenogenesis). Kreuger et al. (2015) report a mean lifespan of 10 - 14 days. As a species in the order Thysanoptera, E. americanus are hemimetabolous insects, meaning they undergo incomplete metamorphosis and have three distinct life stages: egg, nymph, and adult (also called imago). As a member of the suborder Terebrantia, E. americanus has two nymph instars as well as two pupal instars. E. americanus exhibit assortative mating by body size. Female E. americanus place their eggs into plant tissues with their ovipositor.

=== Mating behaviour ===
Mating begins with initial contact or the precopulatory period and is followed by the male mounting the female. In the case that the male is rejected by the female, she raises her abdomen to drive off the male. The male clasps the females pterothorax (meso- and metathorax) with his legs, twisting his abdomen under hers, then inserts the aedeagus. Copulation lasts about four minutes and requires that the antennae come into contact and that the females back is stroked with the males mesothoracic (hind) legs. Males produce pheromones that appear to induce mating behaviours and that indicate to other males that a female has been previously mated with. E. americanus is one of few species (mostly Dipterans) in which male-produced contact pheromones are known to occur. A pheromone has been identified that likely allows individual E. americanus to distinguish between males and females. Females rarely mate a second time, typically only mating once. Males are known to guard female pupae and mate with them soon after the female ecloses, this is likely due to the strong local mate competition when living in high densities on leaf surfaces.

=== Sex determination ===
E. americanus reproduce via arrhenotoky, meaning fertilized eggs develop into diploid females while unfertilized eggs develop into haploid males. While females tend to mate only once, they are also able to reproduce without mating due to arrhenotoky. The offspring produced without mating will all be haploid males.

== Human impact ==
Many species of thrips are polyphagous and feed extensively on foliage of both crops and ornamental plants, causing millions of USD in crop loss annually. Several behavioural and morphological characteristics of E. americanus make chemical control of the species difficult.

=== Biological control ===
Ghasemzadeh et al. (2017) investigated the potential of phytoseiid predatory mites as a means of biological control to combat E. americanus damage. The mites, supplemented by pollen, were able to significantly reduce juvenile E. americanus populations. Amblyseius swirskii and Euseius ovalis were the most efficient at controlling the juvenile E. americanus populations. Predatory mites have not been documented to consume adult E. americanus, however, so more research into the biological control of this species is needed.
