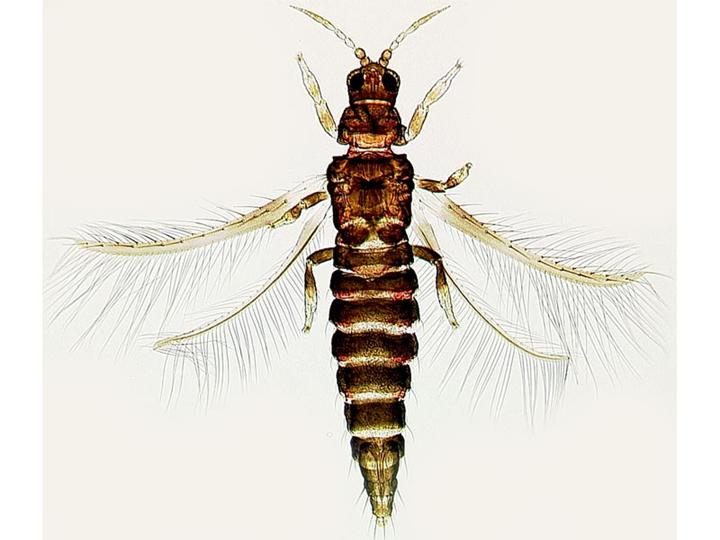
- Echinothrips americanus

Scientific classification
- Kingdom: Animalia
- Phylum: Arthropoda
- Class: Insecta
- Order: Thysanoptera
- Family: Thripidae
- Subfamily: Thripinae
- Genus: Echinothrips; Moulton, 1911

= Echinothrips =

Genus of thrips

Echinothrips is a genus of thrips in the family Thripidae. There are about seven described species in Echinothrips.

== Species ==
These seven species belong to the genus Echinothrips:

- Echinothrips americanus Morgan, 1913
- Echinothrips asperatus Hood
- Echinothrips cancer O'Neill
- Echinothrips capricorn O'Neill
- Echinothrips caribeanus Hood, 1955
- Echinothrips floridensis (Watson, 1919)
- Echinothrips subflavus Hood, 1927
