= Psilothrips pardalotus =

Scientific classification
- Kingdom: Animalia
- Phylum: Arthropoda
- Class: Insecta
- Order: Thysanoptera
- Family: Thripidae
- Genus: Psilothrips
- Species: P. pardalotus

Binomial name
- Psilothrips pardalotus Hood, 1927

Species of thrip

Psilothrips pardalotus is a species of thrips in the family Thripidae. It is found in North America.
