= Thrips simplex =

Scientific classification
- Domain: Eukaryota
- Kingdom: Animalia
- Phylum: Arthropoda
- Class: Insecta
- Order: Thysanoptera
- Family: Thripidae
- Genus: Thrips
- Species: T. simplex

Binomial name
- Thrips simplex Morison, 1930

Species of thrip

Thrips simplex is a species of insect in the genus Thrips in the order Thysanoptera. It is commonly known as the gladiolus thrips and infests gladiolus plants as well as various other monocotyledonous plants such as lilies, irises and freesias.

== Description ==
Thrips simplex is a tiny insect, measuring 2 mm (0.08 in) long, with a long slender brownish-black body with a pale band at the base of the wings. The larvae are wingless and yellow or orange. These thrips live hidden inside the leaf and flower sheaths of their host plants where they suck sap, usually occurring in groups. Females may lay about one hundred eggs over the course of a few months and there may be two or three generations each year. The eggs are laid on or in the plant tissues and the larvae suck sap. After two larval stages they develop into non-feeding prepupae and may drop off onto the soil. After a brief pupal stage they become winged adults.

== Damage ==
The gladiolus thrips feeds on gladiolus, lily, freesia, crocus and iris, but damage is mostly limited to the gladiolus. The thrips can remain inside the corms of gladiolus over winter, causing them to ooze sap from the wounds, turn brown and sticky. These corms are the main source of infestation in growing plants the following year; the emerging leaves are tunnelled and appear silvery at first, turning brown later. Heavy infestation can cause poor plant growth and the plant may fail to flower. When the thrips tunnel into the flowers, these can be scarred and distorted. Other damage may be brown buds, discoloured or streaked blooms, and bleached or distorted flower spikes.

== Control ==
The gladiolus thrips cannot survive in the soil in winter in areas where there are frosts and will also be killed if gladiolus corms are lifted and stored between 35 and 40 °F (2 and 4 °C) for four months.
