= Platythrips =

Scientific classification
- Domain: Eukaryota
- Kingdom: Animalia
- Phylum: Arthropoda
- Class: Insecta
- Order: Thysanoptera
- Family: Thripidae
- Genus: Platythrips; Uzel, 1895

Genus of insects

Platythrips is a genus of insects belonging to the family Thripidae.

The species of this genus are found in Estonia.

Species:

- Platythrips tunicatus (Haliday, 1852)
