= Chirothrips =

Scientific classification
- Domain: Eukaryota
- Kingdom: Animalia
- Phylum: Arthropoda
- Class: Insecta
- Order: Thysanoptera
- Family: Thripidae
- Subfamily: Thripinae
- Genus: Chirothrips; Haliday, 1836

Type species
- Thrips (Chirothrips) manicata

Synonyms
- Agrostothrips Hood, 1954

Genus of thrips

Chirothrips is a genus of insects belonging to the family Thripidae.

The genus was first described by Haliday in 1836.

The genus has cosmopolitan distribution in florets of Poaceae.

== Species ==
Data from

- Chirothrips aculeatus (Bagnall, 1927)
- Chirothrips africanus Priesner, 1932
- Chirothrips ah Girault, 1929
- Chirothrips alexanderae Stannard, 1959
- Chirothrips andrei zur Strassen, 1974
- Chirothrips atricorpus (Girault, 1927)
- Chirothrips azoricus zur Strassen, 1981
- Chirothrips capensis zur Strassen, 1958
- Chirothrips choui Feng & Li, 1996
- Chirothrips cuneiceps Hood, 1940
- Chirothrips cypriotes Hood, 1938
- Chirothrips egregius zur Strassen, 1957
- Chirothrips falsus Priesner, 1925
- Chirothrips faurei zur Strassen, 1957
- Chirothrips frontalis Williams, 1914
- Chirothrips guillarmodi (Hood, 1954)
- Chirothrips hamatus Trybom, 1895
- Chirothrips hemingi Nakahara & Foottit, 2012
- Chirothrips insolitus Hood, 1915
- Chirothrips insularis Hood, 1938
- Chirothrips kurdistanus zur Strassen, 1967
- Chirothrips longispinus Pelikan, 1964
- Chirothrips loyolae Ananthakrishnan, 1959
- Chirothrips manicatus (Haliday, 1836)
- Chirothrips maximi Ananthakrishnan, 1957
- Chirothrips medius zur Strassen, 1965
- Chirothrips meridionalis Bagnall, 1927
- Chirothrips molestus Priesner, 1926
- Chirothrips mongolicus zur Strassen, 1963
- Chirothrips orizaba Hood, 1938
- Chirothrips pallidicornis Priesner, 1925
- Chirothrips patruelis Hood, 1940
- Chirothrips praeocularis Andre, 1941
- Chirothrips pretorianus Hood, 1953
- Chirothrips productus Hood, 1927
- Chirothrips propinquus zur Strassen, 1967
- Chirothrips ruptipennis Priesner, 1938
- Chirothrips secalis Moulton, 1936
- Chirothrips spinulosus Andre, 1941
- Chirothrips tenuicauda zur Strassen, 1963
- Chirothrips tibialis (Blanchard, 1851)
- Chirothrips watanabei Ishida, 1931
