= Scirtothrips aurantii =

Scientific classification
- Kingdom: Animalia
- Phylum: Arthropoda
- Clade: Pancrustacea
- Class: Insecta
- Order: Thysanoptera
- Family: Thripidae
- Genus: Scirtothrips
- Species: S. aurantii

Binomial name
- Scirtothrips aurantii Faure, 1929

Species of thrip

Scirtothrips aurantii is a thrips pest of Citrus spp., Mangifera indica, Musa × paradisiaca, Musa acuminata, and Camellia sinensis.

== Range ==
=== Native range ===
Native to Africa and Yemen.

=== Introduced range ===
- Australia, first detected in Brisbane, Queensland in 2002. Surprisingly the usual infestation of Citrus is absent, and of Mangifera indica essentially absent. This brings up several possible theories but none have been proven so far.
- Spain, first detected September 28th 2020 in Cartaya and Lepe, Province of Huelva, Andalusia by traps laid out by the government - and simultaneously by a berry company nearby. 12 municipalities in the province are under a phytosanitary order that will include insecticide treatment.

== As a biocontrol ==
Scirtothrips aurantii is an effective biocontrol of Kalanchoe delagoensis (syn. Bryophyllum delagoense), also an invasive species of agricultural relevance in Australia.
