= Ctenothrips =

Scientific classification
- Kingdom: Animalia
- Phylum: Arthropoda
- Class: Insecta
- Order: Thysanoptera
- Family: Thripidae
- Subfamily: Thripinae
- Genus: Ctenothrips; Franklin, 1907

Genus of thrips

Ctenothrips is a genus of thrips in the family Thripidae. There are about 10 described species in Ctenothrips.

== Species ==
These 10 species belong to the genus Ctenothrips:

- Ctenothrips barapatharensis
- Ctenothrips bridwelli Franklin, 1907
- Ctenothrips distinctus (Uzel, 1895)
- Ctenothrips frosti Moulton, 1929
- Ctenothrips guizhouensis
- Ctenothrips kwanzanensis Takahashi, 1937
- Ctenothrips niger Kudo
- Ctenothrips nonnae Haga & Okajima, 1989
- Ctenothrips smilax Bhatti
- Ctenothrips transeolineae Chen, 1979
