= Kakothrips =

Scientific classification
- Kingdom: Animalia
- Phylum: Arthropoda
- Class: Insecta
- Order: Thysanoptera
- Family: Thripidae
- Subfamily: Thripinae
- Genus: Kakothrips; Williams, 1914

Genus of thrip

Kakothrips is a genus of thrips.

== Species ==
The following species are accepted within Kakothrips:

- Kakothrips acanthus Berzosa, 1994
- Kakothrips borberae Marullo & Ravazzi, 2016
- Kakothrips dentatus Knechtel, 1939
- Kakothrips dolosus Berzosa, 1994
- Kakothrips firmoides Priesner, 1932
- Kakothrips pisivorus (Westwood, 1880)
- Kakothrips priesneri Pelikan, 1965
- Kakothrips priesnerorum Bournier, 1971
- Kakothrips robustus (Uzel, 1895)
