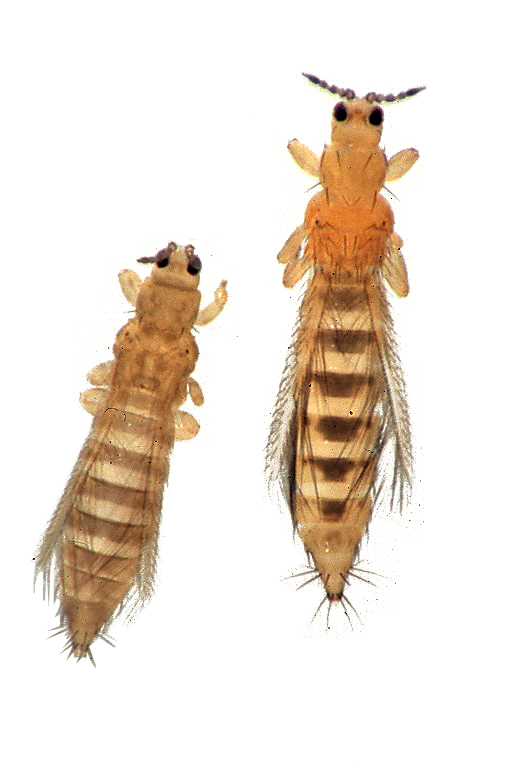
- Thrips tabaci (left); Frankliniella occidentalis (right)

Scientific classification
- Kingdom: Animalia
- Phylum: Arthropoda
- Class: Insecta
- Order: Thysanoptera
- Family: Thripidae
- Subfamily: Thripinae
- Genus: Thrips; Linnaeus, 1758

Type species
- Thrips physapus Linnaeus, 1758

Synonyms
- Achaetothrips Karny, 1908; Parathrips Karny, 1907

= Thrips (genus) =

Genus of thrips

Thrips is a genus of insects in the order Thysanoptera.

== Ecology ==
Species in the genus Thrips feed on pollen, and can be major agricultural pests, with several being vectors of tospoviruses.

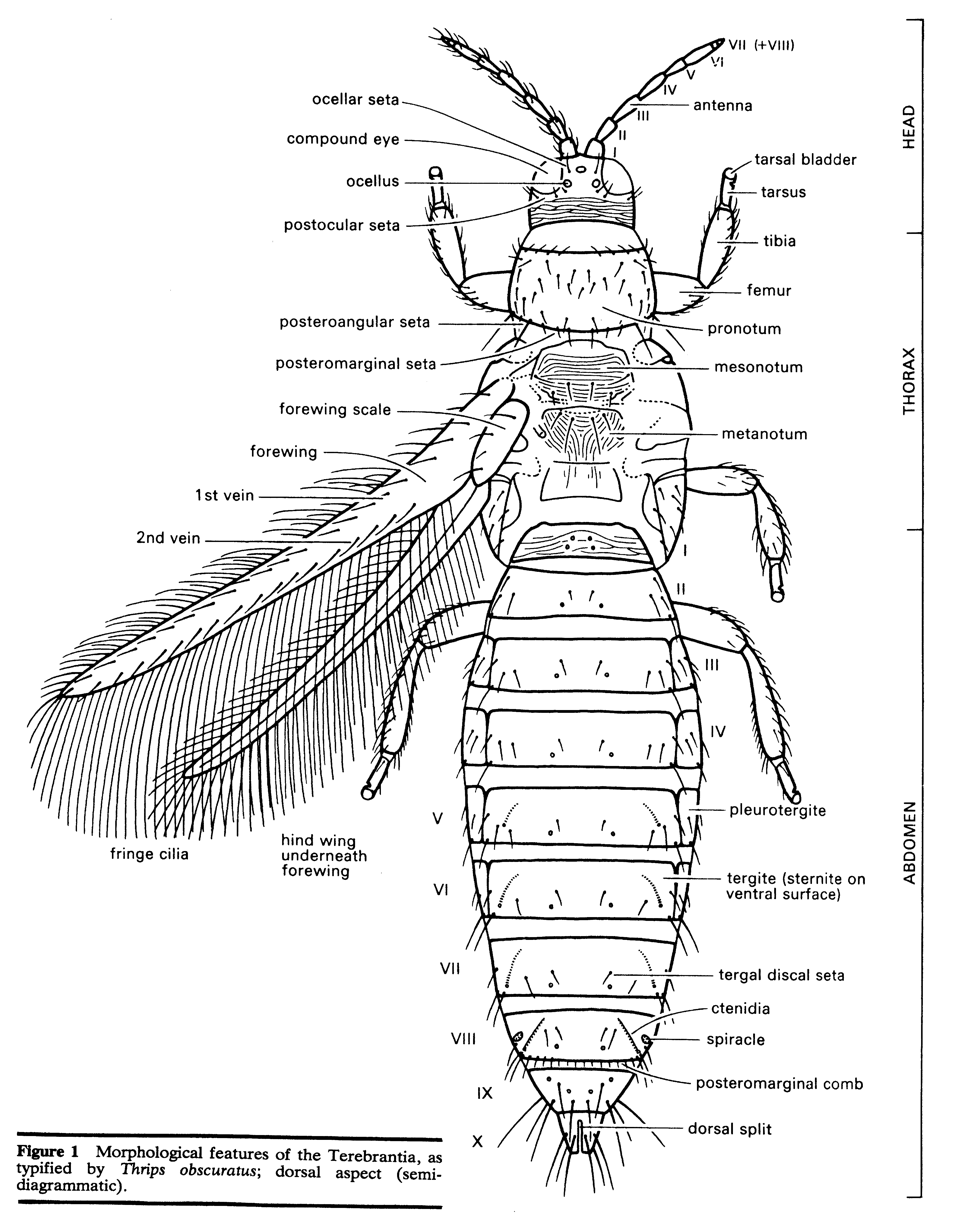
Thrips obscuratus morphology illustrated by Des Helmore

== Etymology ==
The name Thrips comes from the Greek word θρίψ meaning woodworm.

== Diversity ==
Thrips is the largest genus of thrips, with over 280 species, most of which are found in Europe, Africa and the Mediterranean Basin. Other species occur on each of the continents, including one species described from Antarctica. Thrips includes the species of thrips most frequently intercepted at ports of entry into the United States, T. tabaci.

The following species are recognised:

- Thrips abyssiniae
- Thrips acaciae
- Thrips addendus
- Thrips alatus
- Thrips albogilvus
- Thrips albopilosus
- Thrips aleuritis
- Thrips alius
- Thrips alliorum
- Thrips alni
- Thrips alysii
- Thrips andrewsi
- Thrips angusticeps
- Thrips annulata
- Thrips annulicornis
- Thrips antiaropsidis
- Thrips antiquus
- Thrips apicatus
- Thrips arizonensis
- Thrips arorai
- Thrips asparagi
- Thrips aspera
- Thrips aspinus
- Thrips assimilis
- Thrips atactus
- Thrips atratus
- Thrips aurantithoracis
- Thrips aureolariae
- Thrips aureus
- Thrips aurulentus
- Thrips austellus
- Thrips australis
- Thrips beharensis
- Thrips benseleri
- Thrips beta
- Thrips bianchii
- Thrips biunculatus
- Thrips bourbonensis
- Thrips brevialatus
- Thrips brevicornis
- Thrips brevipilosus
- Thrips brevisetosus
- Thrips brevistylus
- Thrips brunneus
- Thrips buxi
- Thrips calcaratus
- Thrips candidus
- Thrips cardui
- Thrips carthami
- Thrips cedri
- Thrips cereolus
- Thrips cerno
- Thrips chandni
- Thrips cinchonae
- Thrips coloratus
- Thrips compressicornis
- Thrips conferticornis
- Thrips conicus
- Thrips conocephali
- Thrips coprosmae
- Thrips corydali
- Thrips corymbiferarum
- Thrips crassicornis
- Thrips crawfordi
- Thrips cynorrhodi
- Thrips darwini
- Thrips decens
- Thrips dentatus
- Thrips diana
- Thrips difficilis
- Thrips dilatatus
- Thrips discolor
- Thrips disjunctus
- Thrips distinctus
- Thrips dorax
- Thrips dubius
- Thrips englerinae
- Thrips euphorbiae
- Thrips euphorbiicola
- Thrips evulgo
- Thrips excaeletus
- Thrips extensicornis
- Thrips facetus
- Thrips fallaciosus
- Thrips fascicornis
- Thrips fedorovi
- Thrips femoralis
- Thrips flavidulus
- Thrips flavus
- Thrips floreus
- Thrips floricola
- Thrips florum
- Thrips formosanus
- Thrips fraudulentus
- Thrips frosti
- Thrips fulmeki
- Thrips fulvipes
- Thrips fumosoides
- Thrips fumosus
- Thrips funebris
- Thrips fuscicornis
- Thrips fuscipennis
- Thrips gardeniae
- Thrips garuda
- Thrips gentluteae
- Thrips georgicus
- Thrips gossypii
- Thrips gowdeyi
- Thrips gracilis
- Thrips gracilis
- Thrips gramineae
- Thrips griseus
- Thrips grossulariae
- Thrips hanifahi
- Thrips hawaiiensis
- Thrips helianthi
- Thrips helvolvus
- Thrips heraclei
- Thrips herricki
- Thrips himalayanus
- Thrips hispidus
- Thrips hoddlei
- Thrips hoodi
- Thrips idahoensis
- Thrips imaginis
- Thrips impar
- Thrips incognitus
- Thrips inferus
- Thrips insignis
- Thrips intricatus
- Thrips iranicus
- Thrips italicus
- Thrips javanicus
- Thrips juniperinus
- Thrips kali
- Thrips klapaleki
- Thrips knoxi
- Thrips kodaikanalensis
- Thrips konoi
- Thrips kotoshoi
- Thrips kurahashii
- Thrips laevicollis
- Thrips latiareus
- Thrips latis
- Thrips leeuweni
- Thrips leptocerus
- Thrips levatus
- Thrips linariae
- Thrips linarius
- Thrips lini
- Thrips lividus
- Thrips lomatus
- Thrips longalatus
- Thrips longicaudatus
- Thrips longiceps
- Thrips maculicollis
- Thrips madroni
- Thrips magnus
- Thrips major
- Thrips malloti
- Thrips mancosetosus
- Thrips mareoticus
- Thrips martini
- Thrips medialis
- Thrips mediterraneus
- Thrips melastomae
- Thrips menyanthidis
- Thrips meridionalis
- Thrips meruensis
- Thrips microchaetus
- Thrips minutissimus
- Thrips mirus
- Thrips modicus
- Thrips monotropae
- Thrips montanus
- Thrips morindae
- Thrips mucidus
- Thrips nelsoni
- Thrips nigropilosus
- Thrips novocaledonensis
- Thrips obscuratus
- Thrips obscuripes
- Thrips ochracea
- Thrips oneillae
- Thrips orientalis
- Thrips origani
- Thrips oryzophagus
- Thrips pallicornis
- Thrips pallidicollis
- Thrips pallidulus
- Thrips pallisetis
- Thrips palmerae
- Thrips palmi
- Thrips paludosus
- Thrips palustris
- Thrips panousei
- Thrips paradoxa
- Thrips paramadroni
- Thrips parvispinus
- Thrips pauciporus
- Thrips pavettae
- Thrips pectinatus
- Thrips pectiniprivus
- Thrips pelikani
- Thrips pennatus
- Thrips persicae
- Thrips phormiicola
- Thrips physapus
- Thrips pillichi
- Thrips pini
- Thrips pistaciae
- Thrips porteri
- Thrips poultoni
- Thrips praetermissus
- Thrips pretiosus
- Thrips priesneri
- Thrips pruni
- Thrips pseudoflavus
- Thrips pusillus
- Thrips quadridentatus
- Thrips quilicii
- Thrips quinciensis
- Thrips ranunculi
- Thrips rapaensis
- Thrips reticulatus
- Thrips rhabdotus
- Thrips robustus
- Thrips roepkei
- Thrips rostratus
- Thrips rufescens
- Thrips rugicollis
- Thrips safrus
- Thrips sambuci
- Thrips samoaensis
- Thrips schliephakei
- Thrips scotti
- Thrips sensarmai
- Thrips seticollis
- Thrips setipennis
- Thrips setosus
- Thrips sierrensis
- Thrips sieversiae
- Thrips simplex
- Thrips simulator
- Thrips sinaiticus
- Thrips solari
- Thrips speratus
- Thrips spinosus
- Thrips stannardi
- Thrips subnudula
- Thrips sukki
- Thrips sumatrensis
- Thrips sylvanus
- Thrips tabaci
- Thrips tanicus
- Thrips taraxaci
- Thrips tarfayensis
- Thrips taurus
- Thrips tectus
- Thrips temperans
- Thrips tenebricosus
- Thrips tenellus
- Thrips thalictri
- Thrips timidus
- Thrips tomeus
- Thrips trehernei
- Thrips tripartitus
- Thrips tristis
- Thrips trybomi
- Thrips unispinus
- Thrips unonae
- Thrips urticae
- Thrips vackari
- Thrips validus
- Thrips variegatus
- Thrips varipes
- Thrips verbasci
- Thrips viminalis
- Thrips vitticornis
- Thrips vuilleti
- Thrips vulgatissimus
- Thrips wedeliae
- Thrips wellsae
- Thrips winnemanae
- Thrips xenos
