= Psilothrips =

Scientific classification
- Kingdom: Animalia
- Phylum: Arthropoda
- Class: Insecta
- Order: Thysanoptera
- Family: Thripidae
- Subfamily: Thripinae
- Genus: Psilothrips; Hood, 1927

Genus of thrips

Psilothrips is a genus of thrips in the family Thripidae. There are at least two described species in Psilothrips.

== Species ==
These two species belong to the genus Psilothrips.

- Psilothrips pardalotus Hood, 1927
- Psilothrips priesneri (Moulton, 1926)
