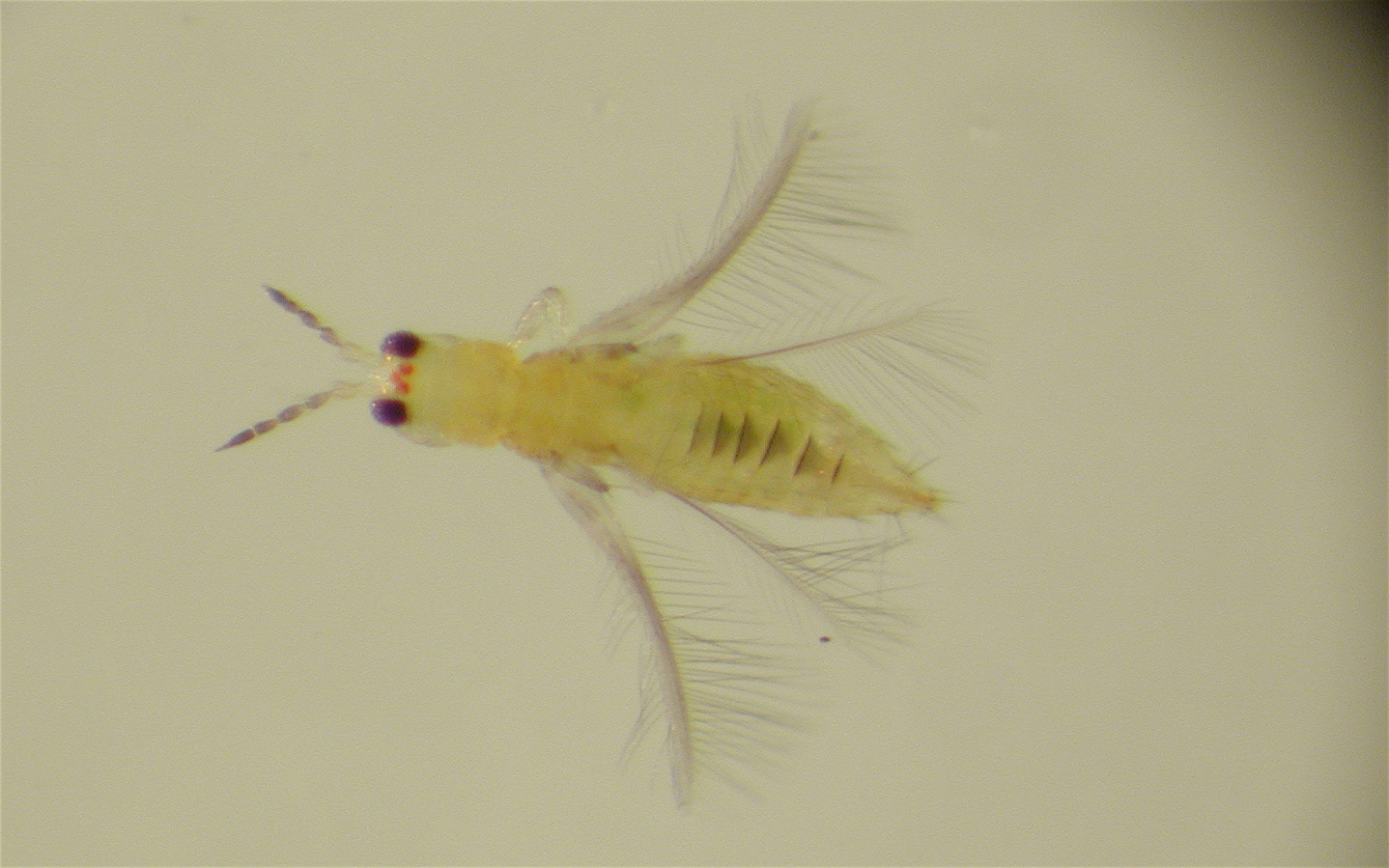
- Scirtothrips dorsalis

Scientific classification
- Domain: Eukaryota
- Kingdom: Animalia
- Phylum: Arthropoda
- Class: Insecta
- Order: Thysanoptera
- Family: Thripidae
- Subfamily: Thripinae
- Genus: Scirtothrips; Shull, 1909

= Scirtothrips =

Genus of thrips

Scirtothrips is a genus of thrips in the family Thripidae.

== Species ==
- Scirtothrips abditus Mound & Marullo, 1996
- Scirtothrips aceri Moulton, 1926
- Scirtothrips acus Wang, 1994
- Scirtothrips admangiferaffinis Johansen & Mojica-Guzman, 1999
- Scirtothrips africanus Faure, 1929
- Scirtothrips akakia Hoddle & Mound, 2003
- Scirtothrips albidus Masumoto & Okajima, 2007
- Scirtothrips albomaculuts Bianchi, 1945
- Scirtothrips albosilvicola Johansen & Mojica-Guzman, 1999
- Scirtothrips albus (Jones, 1912)
- Scirtothrips angusticomis Karny, 1922
- Scirtothrips apatzinganensis Johansen & Mojica-Guzman, 1999
- Scirtothrips asinus Wang, 1994
- Scirtothrips astibos Hoddle & Mound, 2003
- Scirtothrips astrictus Mound & Marullo, 1996
- Scirtothrips aurantii Faure, 1929
- Scirtothrips australiae Hood, 1919
- Scirtothrips aztecus Johansen & Mojica-Guzman, 1999
- Scirtothrips bisbravoae Johansen, 1983
- Scirtothrips bispinosus (Bagnall, 1924)
- Scirtothrips bondari Moulton, 1933
- Scirtothrips bounites Mound & Marullo, 1996
- Scirtothrips bournieri Berzosa & Cano, 1990
- Scirtothrips brevipennis Hood, 1914
- Scirtothrips canizoi Titschack, 1964
- Scirtothrips casuarinae Palmer & Mound, 1983
- Scirtothrips chamelaensis Johansen & Mojica-Guzman, 1999
- Scirtothrips citri (Moulton, 1909)
- Scirtothrips cognatoalbus Johansen & Mojica-Guzman, 1999
- Scirtothrips cognatosilvicola Johansen & Mojica-Guzman, 1999
- Scirtothrips combreti Faure, 1929
- Scirtothrips danieltelizi Johansen & Mojica-Guzman, 1999
- Scirtothrips dieterenkerlini Johansen & Mojica-Guzman, 1999
- Scirtothrips dignus zur Strassen, 1986
- Scirtothrips dobroskyi Moulton, 1936
- Scirtothrips dodonaeae Mound & Stiller, 2011
- Scirtothrips dorsalis Hood, 1919
- Scirtothrips drepanofortis Hoddle & Mound, 2003
- Scirtothrips eremicus Hoddle & Mound, 2003
- Scirtothrips euthyntus Mound & Marullo, 1996
- Scirtothrips ewarti Bailey, 1964
- Scirtothrips flavus Masumoto & Okajima, 2007
- Scirtothrips frondis Hoddle & Mound, 2003
- Scirtothrips fulleri Faure, 1929
- Scirtothrips fumipennis Jacot-Guillarmod, 1937
- Scirtothrips hainanensis Han, 1986
- Scirtothrips hectorganzalizi Johansen & Mojica-Guzman, 1999
- Scirtothrips helenae Palmer & Mound, 1983
- Scirtothrips hengduanicus Han, 1990
- Scirtothrips ikelus Mound & Marullo, 1996
- Scirtothrips inermis Priesner, 1933
- Scirtothrips juniperinus Pelikan, 1963
- Scirtothrips katsura Masumoto & Okajima, 2007
- Scirtothrips kenyensis Mound, 1968
- Scirtothrips kirrhos Hoddle & Mound, 2003
- Scirtothrips longipennis (Bagnall, 1909)
- Scirtothrips litotetes Hoddle & Mound, 2003
- Scirtothrips loennbergi (Trybom, 1912)
- Scirtothrips longipennis (Bagnall, 1909)
- Scirtothrips lumarius Mound & Marullo, 1996
- Scirtothrips machili Masumoto & Okajima, 2007
- Scirtothrips mangiferae Priesner, 1932
- Scirtothrips mangiferaffinis Johansen & Mojica-Guzman, 1999
- Scirtothrips mangoaffinis Johansen & Mojia-Guzman, 1999
- Scirtothrips mangofrequentis Johansen & Mojica-Guzman, 1999
- Scirtothrips mangoinfestans Johansen & Mojica-Guzman, 1999
- Scirtothrips mangomolestus Johansen & Mojica-Guzman, 1999
- Scirtothrips mangonoxius Johansen & Mojica-Guzman, 1999
- Scirtothrips mangorum Johansen & Mojica-Guzman, 1999
- Scirtothrips manihoti Bondar, 1924
- Scirtothrips martingonzalezi Johansen & Mojica-Guzman, 1999
- Scirtothrips moneres Hoddle & Mound, 2003
- Scirtothrips multistriatus Hood, 1954
- Scirtothrips mugambii Mound, 2010
- Scirtothrips musciaffinis Johansen & Mojica-Guzman, 1999
- Scirtothrips niveus Hood, 1913
- Scirtothrips novomangorum Johansen & Mojica-Guzman, 1999
- Scirtothrips nubicus Priesner, 1936
- Scirtothrips oligochaetus (Karny, 1927)
- Scirtothrips pan Mound & Walker, 1982
- Scirtothrips panamensis Hood, 1935
- Scirtothrips pendulae Han, 1986
- Scirtothrips perseae Nakahara, 1997
- Scirtothrips pilbara Hoddle & Mound, 2003
- Scirtothrips prosopsis Hood, 1939
- Scirtothrips pteridicola Ananthakrishnan, 1968
- Scirtothrips pteridis Mound & Marullo, 1996
- Scirtothrips quadriseta Hoddle & Mound, 2003
- Scirtothrips ruthveni Shull, 1909
- Scirtothrips silvatropicalis Johansen & Mojica-Guzman, 1999
- Scirtothrips silvicola Johansen & Mojica-Guzman, 1999
- Scirtothrips solaris Bailey, 1964
- Scirtothrips solus Hoddle & Mound, 2003
- Scirtothrips spinosus Faure, 1929
- Scirtothrips taxendii Hood, 1954
- Scirtothrips tehachapi Bailey, 1964
- Scirtothrips tenor (Bhatti & Mound, 1994)
- Scirtothrips texoloensis Johansen & Mojica-Guzman, 1999
- Scirtothrips tlaxcoensis Johansen & Mojica-Guzman, 1999
- Scirtothrips totonacus Johansen & Mojica-Guzman, 1999
- Scirtothrips willihennigi Johansen & Mojica-Guzman, 1999
- Scirtothrips zacualtipanensis Johansen & Mojica-Guzman, 1999
- Scirtothrips zuluensis Faure, 1929
