= Salpingothrips =

Scientific classification
- Kingdom: Animalia
- Phylum: Arthropoda
- Class: Insecta
- Order: Thysanoptera
- Family: Thripidae
- Subfamily: Thripinae
- Genus: Salpingothrips; Hood, 1935

Genus of thrips

Salpingothrips is a genus of thrips in the family Thripidae. There are at least three described species in Salpingothrips.

== Species ==
These three species belong to the genus Salpingothrips:

- Salpingothrips aimotofus Kudo, 1972
- Salpingothrips hoodi Ananthakrishnan
- Salpingothrips minimus Hood
