= Stenchaetothrips =

Scientific classification
- Domain: Eukaryota
- Kingdom: Animalia
- Phylum: Arthropoda
- Class: Insecta
- Order: Thysanoptera
- Family: Thripidae
- Subfamily: Thripinae
- Genus: Stenchaetothrips; Bagnall, 1926

Synonyms
- Anaphidothrips Hood, 1954; Chloethrips Priesner, 1957; Mictothrips Ananthakrishnan, 1967; Xynothrips Ananthakrishnan, 1967

Genus of thrips

External image
- Images at iNaturalist

Stenchaetothrips is a genus of thrips in the subfamily Thripinae, erected by R.S. Bagnall in 1926. Species such as Stenchaetothrips biformis may become grain crop pests including rice, especially in dry conditions.

== Species ==
The Global Biodiversity Information Facility lists:

1. Stenchaetothrips albicornus Zhang & Tong, 1990
2. Stenchaetothrips amamiensis Masumoto & Okajima, 2013
3. Stenchaetothrips apheles Wang, 2000
4. Stenchaetothrips aralis Bhatti, 1982
5. Stenchaetothrips bambusae (Shumsher, 1946)
6. Stenchaetothrips bambusicola Mound, 2011
7. Stenchaetothrips banghongensis Hu & Feng, 2016
8. Stenchaetothrips basibrunneus Wang, 2000
9. Stenchaetothrips bicolor (Ananthakrishnan & Jagadish, 1967)
10. Stenchaetothrips biformis (Bagnall, 1913)
11. Stenchaetothrips brochus Wang, 2000
12. Stenchaetothrips caulis Bhatti, 1982
13. Stenchaetothrips cymbopogoni Zhang & Tong, 1990
14. Stenchaetothrips dentatus Masumoto & Okajima, 2013
15. Stenchaetothrips dissidens (Ananthakrishnan & Jagadish, 1967)
16. Stenchaetothrips divisae Bhatti, 1982
17. Stenchaetothrips faurei (Bhatti, 1962)
18. Stenchaetothrips fuscus (Moulton, 1936)
19. Stenchaetothrips gaomiaoensis (Zhang & Feng, 2017)
20. Stenchaetothrips glandularis (Ananthakrishnan & Jagadish, 1967)
21. Stenchaetothrips graminis (Ananthakrishnan & Jagadish, 1967)
22. Stenchaetothrips hullikali Tyagi & Kumar, 2008
23. Stenchaetothrips hupingshanensis Man & Feng, 2015
24. Stenchaetothrips indicus (Ramakrishna & Margabandhu, 1931)
25. Stenchaetothrips karnyianus (Priesner, 1934)
26. Stenchaetothrips koitakii (Moulton, 1940)
27. Stenchaetothrips langkawiensis Ng & Mound, 2012
28. Stenchaetothrips martini Mound, Gunawardina & Li, 2017
29. Stenchaetothrips melanurus Bagnall, 1926
30. Stenchaetothrips minutus (Deventer, 1906)
31. Stenchaetothrips mucunae (Ishida, 1934)
32. Stenchaetothrips pleioblasti Masumoto & Okajima, 2013
33. Stenchaetothrips pteratus Bhatti, 1982
34. Stenchaetothrips sacchari (Kruger, 1890)
35. Stenchaetothrips scius Bhatti, 1982
36. Stenchaetothrips spinalis Reyes, 1994
37. Stenchaetothrips spinulae Tyagi & Kumar, 2008
38. Stenchaetothrips tenebricus (Ananthakrishnan & Jagadish, 1968)
39. Stenchaetothrips undatus Wang, 2000
40. Stenchaetothrips victoriensis (Moulton, 1936)
41. Stenchaetothrips zehntneri (Deventer, 1906)
42. Stenchaetothrips zhangi Duan, Li, Yang & Yan, 1998
