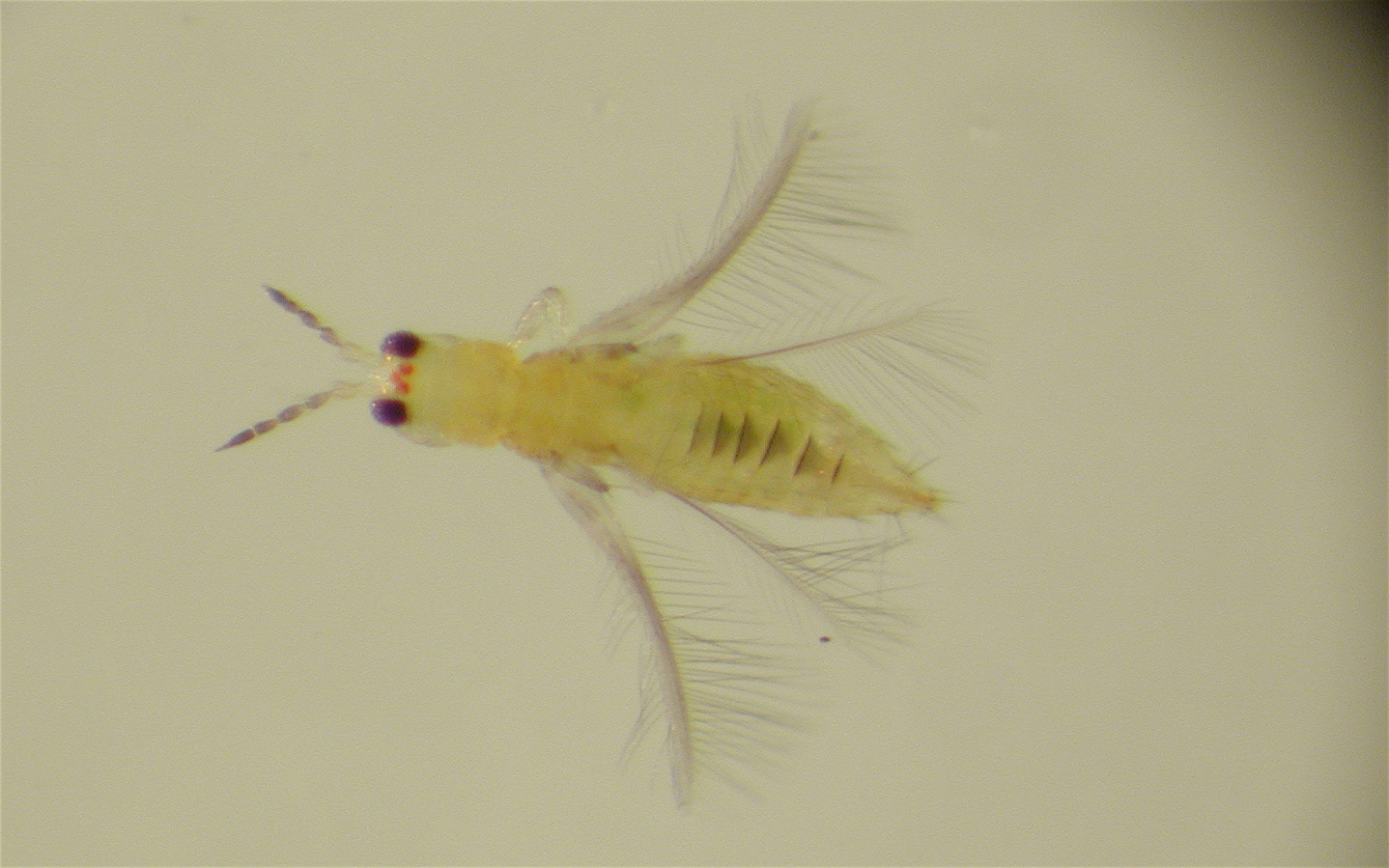

Scientific classification
- Kingdom: Animalia
- Phylum: Arthropoda
- Clade: Pancrustacea
- Class: Insecta
- Order: Thysanoptera
- Family: Thripidae
- Genus: Scirtothrips
- Species: S. dorsalis

Binomial name
- Scirtothrips dorsalis Hood, 1919

Synonyms
- Heliothrips minutissimus Bagnall, 1919; Anaphothrips andreae Karny, 1925; Neophysopus fragariae Girault, 1927; Scirtothrips padmae Ramakrishna, 1942

= Scirtothrips dorsalis =

Species of thrip

Scirtothrips dorsalis, the chilli thrips (Note: This is the more common international spelling of "chilli" outside of the United States. This spelling has been preserved in the common name for the insect by entomologists in the United States in deference to the body of literature already published for this species by international authors.) or yellow tea thrips, is an extremely successful invasive species of pest-thrips which has expanded rapidly from Asia over the last twenty years, and is gradually achieving a global distribution. It has most recently been reported in St. Vincent (2004), Florida (2005), Texas (2006) and Puerto Rico (2007). It is a pest of economic significance with a broad host range, with prominent pest reports on crops including pepper, eggplant, mango, citrus, strawberry, grapes, cotton, tea, peanuts, blueberry, and roses. Chilli thrips appear to feed preferentially on new growth, and infested plants usually develop characteristic wrinkled leaves, with distinctive brown scarring along the veins of leaves, the buds of flowers, and the calyx of fruit. Feeding damage can reduce the sale value of crops produced, and in sufficient numbers, kill plants already aggravated by environmental stress. This thrips has also been implicated in the transmission of three tospoviruses, but there is some controversy over its efficiency as a vector.

This thrips has a rapid life cycle, and can develop from egg to adult in slightly less than two weeks under optimal weather conditions.

== Identification ==
A tentative (but inconclusive) field identification can be made of this thrips by searching for the following traits under low power magnification: small size (under a millimeter in length), yellow coloration, dark antennae, and dark striping on the lower abdomen.

It can be specifically identified and confirmed through the presence of forked sense cones on antennal segments III and IV, antennomeres I-II are pale and III to IX are dark; there are three discal setae on the lateral margins of abdominal tergites, with pronotal posteromarginal seta II nearly one and a half times the length of I or III, a complete posteromarginal comb on tergite VII; and three ocellar setae with III between posterior ocelli.

Recent research concludes that S. dorsalis does represent a species complex of three or more disparate species who are morphologically similar but genetically distinct.

== Biology ==
Like all thrips of suborder Terebrantia, S. dorsalis undergoes two nymphal stages followed by two "false" pupal stages, and under optimal conditions, this thrips may reach adulthood in approximately two weeks. However, research has shown that the length of these life-history stages are flexible within a group depending on an individual's access to nutrients and temperature. Nymphs entering the metamorphic process drop off of the plant during the first of two propual stages, and then complete their development in loose soil or leaf litter at the base of their host - but have been observed to pupate in any dark and humid crevice low on the plant, including bark and the folds of tightly packed lower leaves or flowers. The pupal process can range from two days to a full week. In temperate regions where the temperature falls below the critical lower threshold, non-diapausing adults are reported to overwinter in the soil or apical buds. Colder temperatures may even drive pupation, but this has not been experimentally confirmed.

Post-emergence, females have a pre-oviposition period of one to two days. Using their ovipositor, females lay single eggs within the plant tissue, and may lay an average of forty eggs during their lifetime. Females of S. dorsalis prefer to lay their eggs inside of young leaves and buds at the apical meristem of plants, but as populations increase, will lay their eggs within the surface of mature leaves. Depending on temperature, eggs may gestate for one to three weeks. After hatching, larvae will migrate from older leaves to the newer growth at terminals. Like many thrips, S. dorsalis appears to prefer feeding on new growth and young plants, and is often found on the newer top leaves on smaller plants, although individual plant morphology and chemistry may result in some distributional differences.

Nymph populations will continue to increase so long as new shoots are allowed to grow, and adults are permitted to land. Physically manipulating the host by removing preferred feeding sites has been shown to reduce thrips density on the plant, but also to increase the relative rate of between-plot dispersal.

== History of Expansion ==
Molecular evidence currently suggests that the point of biogeographical origin for the thrips is in Southeast Asia or on the Indian subcontinent, but the original host remains unknown. Chili peppers did not arrive in India until the sixteenth and seventeenth centuries with Portuguese traders, so the host upon which S. dorsalis was first described cannot be the point of origin. Given S. dorsalis’ broad polyphagy and long history of pestilent behavior, it has been speculated that a weed such as castor that was adopted for agriculture may have been one of several hosts of origin, and that the thrips adapted and began to exploit other hosts as they became available in the changing agricultural landscape.

It spread rapidly throughout the contiguous region of southeastern Asia fairly early, and there are many historical instances of these thrips attacking key crops on a regular basis. In India, it has been described as a pest of castor, pepper, cotton, tea, mango, and peanut. Outside of India, it has been reported as pest in China on tea and fruits like litchi, in Taiwan on citrus and vegetable, on citrus and tea in Japan, many vegetable and fruit crops in Thailand, peppers and mango in Vietnam, and even seasonally on the Korean peninsula.

Under the pressures of globalization and trade, this thrips has continued to expand its range, and in 1997 EPPO recognized this pest as one with significant potential for global expansion. By that point it had already become fairly established beyond its precinctive range, had been intercepted at South African ports in 1986, noted as a pest in Kenya by 1997, and infesting cotton in Côte d'Ivoire by 1999. It has been described as a pest in Australia on cashew in 1998, and on strawberry and tea only a few years later.

It was only a matter of time before S. dorsalis was intercepted in the United States and the Caribbean region. While the thrips had been reported from port interceptions in Florida in 1995 and in Texas in 2000, surveys failed to detect any established populations or other sightings of the thrips. However, interceptions of this insect at a Miami port under the calyces of pepper from St. Vincent in 2003 inspired the USDA to act in order to predict and prevent the pest's arrival. APHIS and the University of Florida responded with investigations of islands in the Caribbean. They found the pest already distributed throughout the Caribbean, and speculated that it had almost certainly already spread throughout South and Central America.

In late 2005, S. dorsalis was reported as a significant pest on Palm Beach County ornamental roses, and reports from other counties on the Knock Out cultivar of rose and pepper rapidly followed thereafter. By January 2007, the thrips had been found in more than thirty counties from Alachua to Monroe, and has been detected in southern Georgia. It has been spotted several times on retail roses in south Texas, and anecdotal evidence suggests that the expansion into Texas counties is probably underreported. Models of climatological and host potential suggest that this thrips has the potential to expand its range to cover much of the southeast, the gulf coast region, and the western seaboard.

== Impact ==
The characteristic feeding damage of S. dorsalis was recognized as "Murda disease" on chili long before the thrips was associated with and then determined to be the cause of the blight. Prolonged feeding by thrips curls tender leaves and buds, and will turn fruits and flowers from bronze to black in color, rendering the plant material unmarketable. Even slightly damaged or scarred vegetables or inflorescences are often viewed as unmarketable, and these damaged commodities will fetch a lower price, reducing a grower's return on their investment. Insects feeding in new growth limits and stunts overall plant growth, and may induce abortion of fruit. When thrips feed in high enough densities, or in sufficiently dry climates, this process results in the eventual desiccation and death of their host plant. Even low densities of thrips can contribute to the decline in fruit production and plant health, especially during times of drought.

S. dorsalis has been implicated in the transmission of several separate tospoviruses, but recent experiments have cast some doubt on the efficiency at which S. dorsalis actually transmits the virus to its hosts. It may be a member of a class described in a near relative, Thrips palmi Karny: an infected non-transmitter with detectable levels of virus.

== Control ==
Chilli thrips are known to develop resistance to pesticides extremely quickly. This is thought to be a consequence of the short timespan and large capacity of their reproductive cycle, drawing comparisons to spider mites. In addition, they have an extremely wide host range, providing population reservoirs even after the most thorough pesticide application.

Only the insecticides spinosyn and abamectin are known to be effective against this pest. Neem based products are considered effective synergists. Product rotation is integral to resistance prevention programs. Insecticidal soaps and horticultural oils are both effective, but only in very frequent, sometimes impractical spray schedules (at least once a week). Systemic neonicotinoids such as imidacloprid were once considered to be sparing of beneficial insects and natural predators, and recommended for integrated pest management of chilli thrips, especially when used as a soil soak or drip irrigation product. The past decade has revealed that neonicotinoids can seriously impact beneficial insects, especially bees, through effects that are not immediately apparent - even at trace concentrations.

Entomopathogenic fungi are an emerging control method being used against a variety of insects, including chilli thrips. Beauveria bassiana and Metarhizium spp. have both attracted research for this use. Multiple such products are available for use in Asian countries. Only one Beauveria bassiana product is registered as an insecticide in the United States. Tests of these products show that they are mediocre control agents, but may be useful in rotation with other insecticides or in combination with spray oils. Unfortunately, these agents are broad spectrum insecticides, and do not spare natural predators or desirable insects such as bees and butterflies.
