= Oidanothrips =

Scientific classification
- Kingdom: Animalia
- Phylum: Arthropoda
- Class: Insecta
- Order: Thysanoptera
- Family: Phlaeothripidae
- Genus: Oidanothrips; Moulton, 1944

Genus of thrips

Oidanothrips is a genus of thrips in the family Phlaeothripidae.

== Species ==
- Oidanothrips enormis
- Oidanothrips frontalis
- Oidanothrips magnus
- Oidanothrips malayensis
- Oidanothrips maxillatus
- Oidanothrips megacephalus
- Oidanothrips moundi
- Oidanothrips nigripes
- Oidanothrips sumatrensis
- Oidanothrips taiwanus
- Oidanothrips takasago
