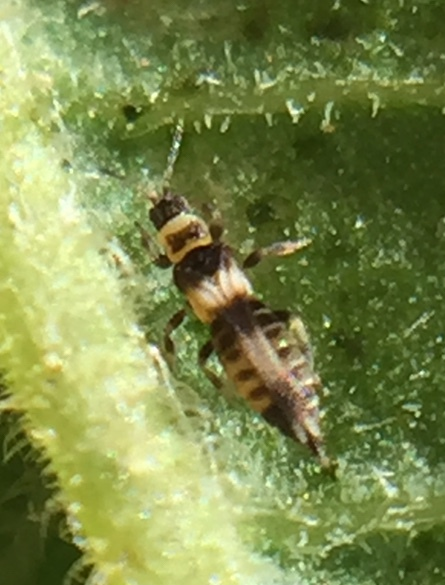

Scientific classification
- Domain: Eukaryota
- Kingdom: Animalia
- Phylum: Arthropoda
- Class: Insecta
- Order: Thysanoptera
- Family: Thripidae
- Genus: Neohydatothrips
- Species: N. samayunkur

Binomial name
- Neohydatothrips samayunkur (Kudo, 1995)

= Neohydatothrips samayunkur =

Species of thrip

Neohydatothrips samayunkur, the marigold thrips, is a species of thrips in the family Thripidae. It is found in Africa, Australia, Europe and Northern Asia (excluding China), Central America, and North America.

Taxonomic note:

- Intercepted at a U.S. quarantine port.
