= Ctenothrips bridwelli =

Scientific classification
- Kingdom: Animalia
- Phylum: Arthropoda
- Class: Insecta
- Order: Thysanoptera
- Family: Thripidae
- Genus: Ctenothrips
- Species: C. bridwelli

Binomial name
- Ctenothrips bridwelli Franklin, 1907

Species of thrip

Ctenothrips bridwelli is a species of thrips in the family Thripidae. It is found in North America.
