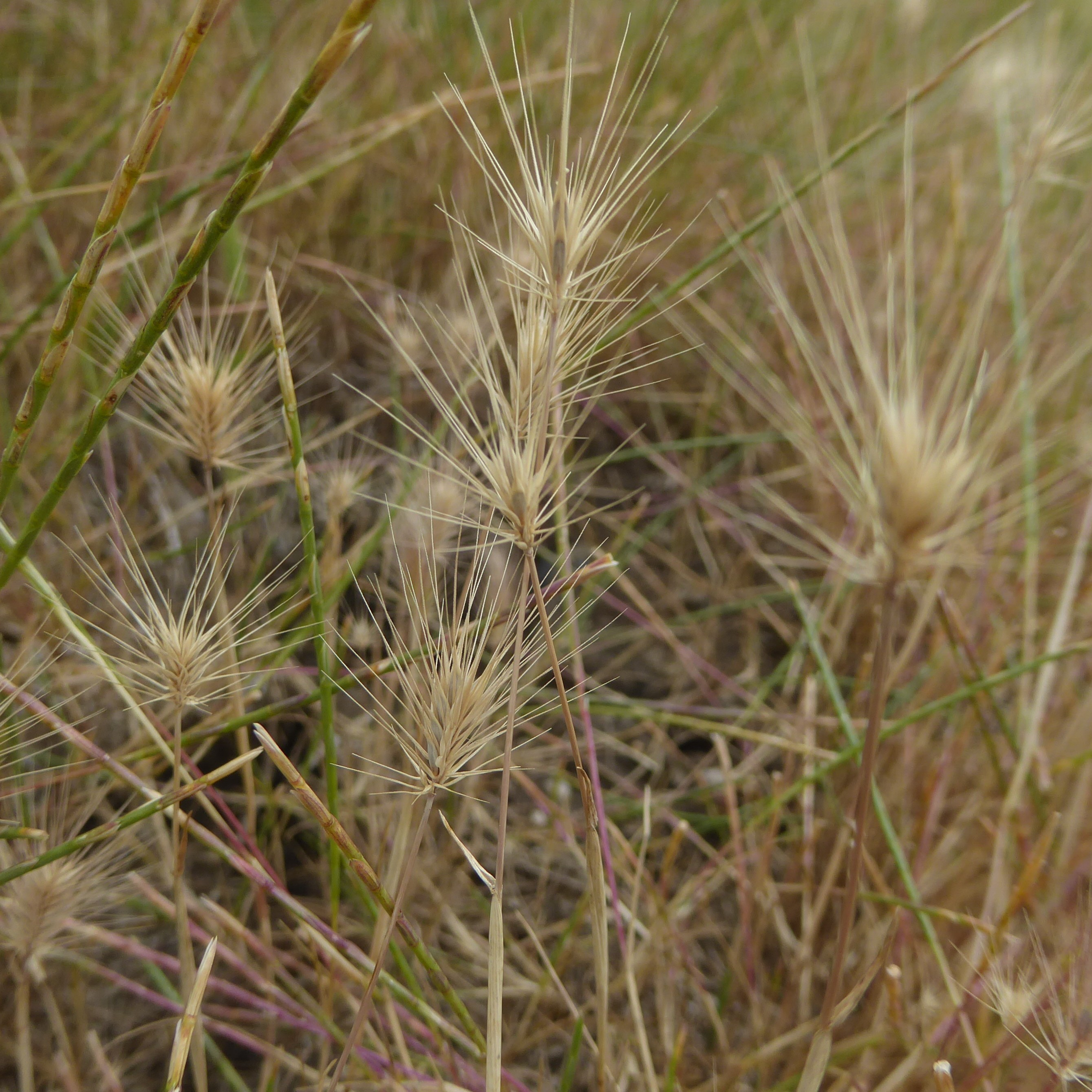

Conservation status
- Least Concern (IUCN 3.1)

Scientific classification
- Kingdom: Plantae
- Clade: Embryophytes
- Clade: Tracheophytes
- Clade: Angiosperms
- Clade: Monocots
- Clade: Commelinids
- Order: Poales
- Family: Poaceae
- Subfamily: Pooideae
- Genus: Hordeum
- Species: H. marinum

Binomial name
- Hordeum marinum Huds.

Synonyms
- List: Critesion marinum (Huds.) Á.Löve Hordeum maritimum With. Hordeum secalinum subsp. marinum (Huds.) Fouill. & Litard.

= Hordeum marinum =

Species of grass

Hordeum marinum, commonly known as sea barley or (subspecies gussoneanum) Mediterranean barley, is a species of flowering plant in the grass family Poaceae that grows on bare ground on the shores of Europe and North Africa. It is also found in inland salt flats such as the Pannonian grasslands of Hungary, and it is widely established outside its range in temperate regions of both the north and south hemispheres. It is an annual, producing copious seed when habitat conditions are right, but not persisting in competition with other species. Although it is a relative of an important crop species, it has no uses itself.

== Description ==
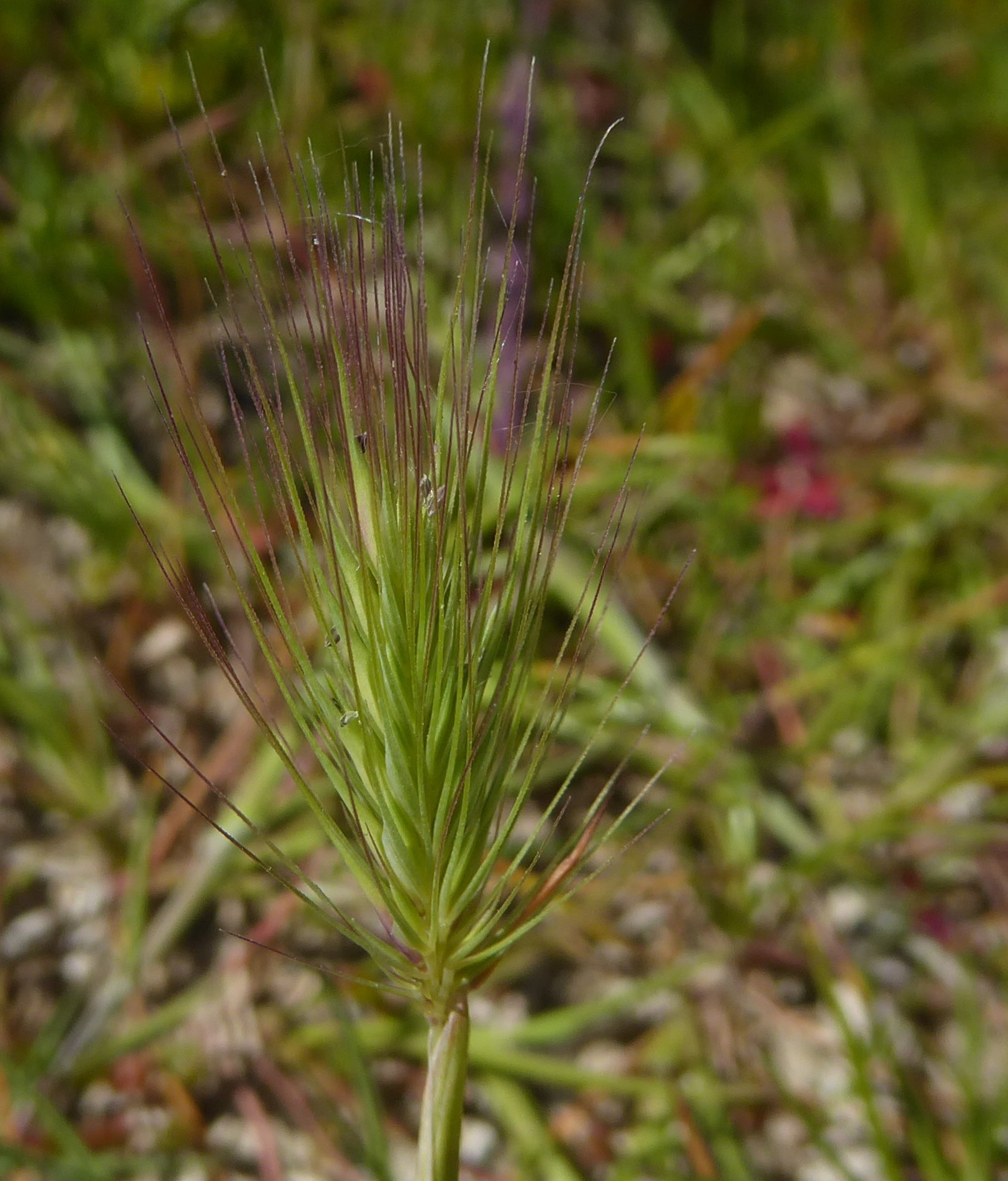
A single inflorescence of sea barley

Sea barley is an annual with spreading to erect stems that grow to about 40 cm tall. The leaf sheaths are somewhat inflated, relative to the stem size, and can be glabrous or minutely hairy. They have small rounded auricles and a short membranous ligule about 0.5 mm long. The leaf blade is similarly glabrous or hairy, and is up to 4 mm wide.

The inflorescence is a false raceme up to 5 cm long and laterally compressed, with numerous clusters ("triads") of 3 one-flowered spikelets. Within each triad, the central spikelet is sessile (stalkless) and fertile while the two lateral ones are borne on short pedicels and are barren. Each spikelet consists of a single floret, with a lemma up to 8 mm long and an awn projecting from its tip, up to 22 mm long. On either side of each lemma is a bristle-like glume up to 22 mm long.

Sea barley is wind-pollinated or self-pollinating. The mature spikes become brittle, and break up into small clusters of fruits, which are often dispersed by floodwaters in the winter, or by the movement of livestock. Germination takes place in both the autumn and the spring.

== Taxonomy ==
The name Hordeum marinum was coined by the English botanist William Hudson in his Flora Anglica of 1778, giving as a synonym the pre-Linnean polynomial Gramen secalinum maritimum minus ("lesser sea meadow-barley"). He gave it the common name "sea barley-grass".

It has few synonyms. William Withering named it Hordeum maritimum in 1787, but that name does not stand as Hudson's came earlier.

Two subspecies of sea barley are recognised. Throughout most of its range H. marinum ssp. marinum is the common one, but around the Mediterranean basin ssp. gussoneanum (Parl.) Thell. (Mediterranean barley) is commoner. Both are widely established elsewhere in the world. The difference between them is slight: ssp. gussonianum has a smaller and wingless inner glume to the lateral spikelets, and a more variable chromosome number (2n = 14 or 28).

== Identification ==
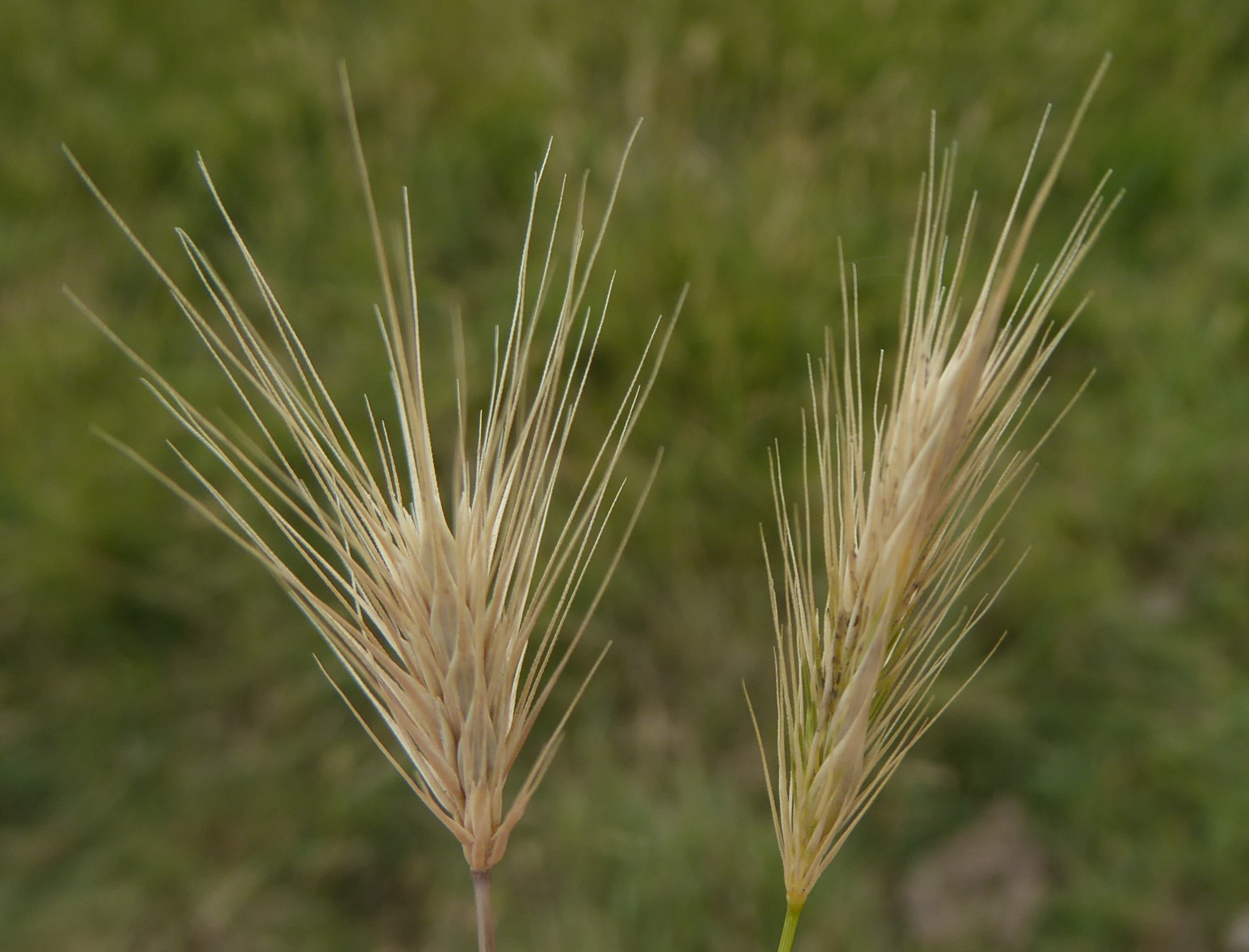
Sea barley (left) and meadow barley are very similar.

Sea barley often grows in the same places as meadow barley or wall barley. Meadow barley is perennial, and so will often have tillers, and the leaf sheaths are not inflated. Wall barley has three fertile florets in each triad, and the awns are ciliate (hairy). Both meadow barley and wall barley also have hairy leaf sheaths, whereas sea barley often does not.

== Distribution and status ==
Sea barley is native throughout Europe, North Africa and as far east as central Asia. It is also established as an introduction in North and South America, South Africa, Australia and Japan. Although it is primarily a coastal plant, it is by no means restricted to seaside areas.

Its IUCN threat status, globally, is Least Concern, reflecting the fact that it is quite widespread and populations are healthy. In Britain, which is at the northern edge of its range, it is classified as vulnerable, because there may have been a decrease in its range in recent decades, although in fact there has been an increase in the population extent, as measured by the number of occupied grid squares.

In France its distribution and status follow the same pattern as in Britain: it is mostly restricted to places near the coast, with just casual populations inland. Its status is LC, except in places like Picardy and Pas-de-Calais in the north, where it declines to Critically Endangered.

== Habitat and ecology ==
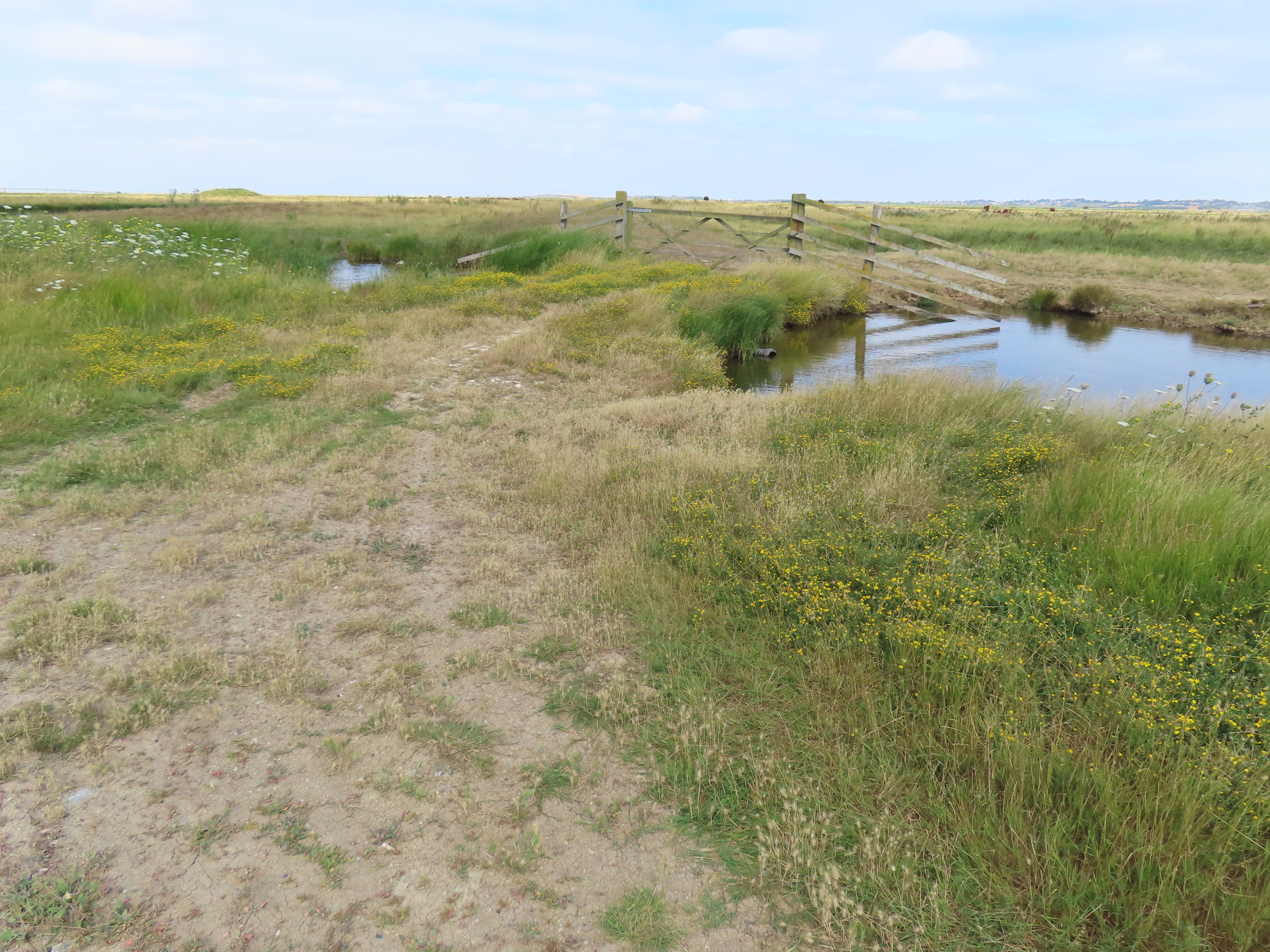
Habitat of sea barley at Elmley National Nature Reserve, Kent

Sea barley grows on patches of bare ground near to the sea, typically along paths or tracks or sometimes in the upper parts of salt marshes. It is also a characteristic plant of the Pannonian inland salt grasslands of south-eastern Europe and, very occasionally, it is found as a roadside halophyte, many miles from the sea.

It needs a lack of competition from other plants, which is usually created by fluctuating water levels or some form of disturbance, such as trampling and grazing by livestock. It flowers and fruits early in the season (typically in June in northern Europe), and reproduces entirely by seed.

In Britain, it is a purely lowland plant, not being found higher than 200 m above sea level.

Sea barley is not recorded in any vegetation community in Britain, possibly because it was too rare to have been sampled. In Europe, however, it is considered a characteristic species of several EUNIS habitats:

- E6.13 - Mediterranean continental halonitrophilic pioneer communities, which occur on inland mud flats;
- A2.523 - Mediterranean short Juncus, Carex, Hordeum and Trifolium saltmeadows, in brackish lagoons on the coast;
- A2.552 - Mediterranean coastal halo-nitrophilous pioneer communities, found on mud flats close to the shore; and
- R6-1 - Mediterranean inland salt steppe, which includes the Pannonian salt flats, where evaporation causes the soils to become saline.

There are several fungi that attack sea barley: the smut fungus Ustilago bullata produces galls in the flowers, while Tilletia controversa creates smut balls in the seeds; meanwhile, several species cause damage to the leaves, including barley powdery mildew, Puccinia hordei (including P. hordei-murini and P. hordei-maritimi), and a fungus called stem rust is known to infect the culms.

There is also an aphid, Metopolophium dirhodum which has been found on sea barley, and a species of thrips, Limothrips angulicornis, which feeds on the leaves.
