= Parabaphothrips =

Scientific classification
- Kingdom: Animalia
- Phylum: Arthropoda
- Class: Insecta
- Order: Thysanoptera
- Family: Phlaeothripidae
- Genus: Parabaphothrips; Moulton, 1949

Genus of thrips

Parabaphothrips is a genus of thrips in the family Phlaeothripidae, first described by Dudley Moulton in 1949. There is just one species in this genus: Parabaphothrips coffeae found in Africa.
