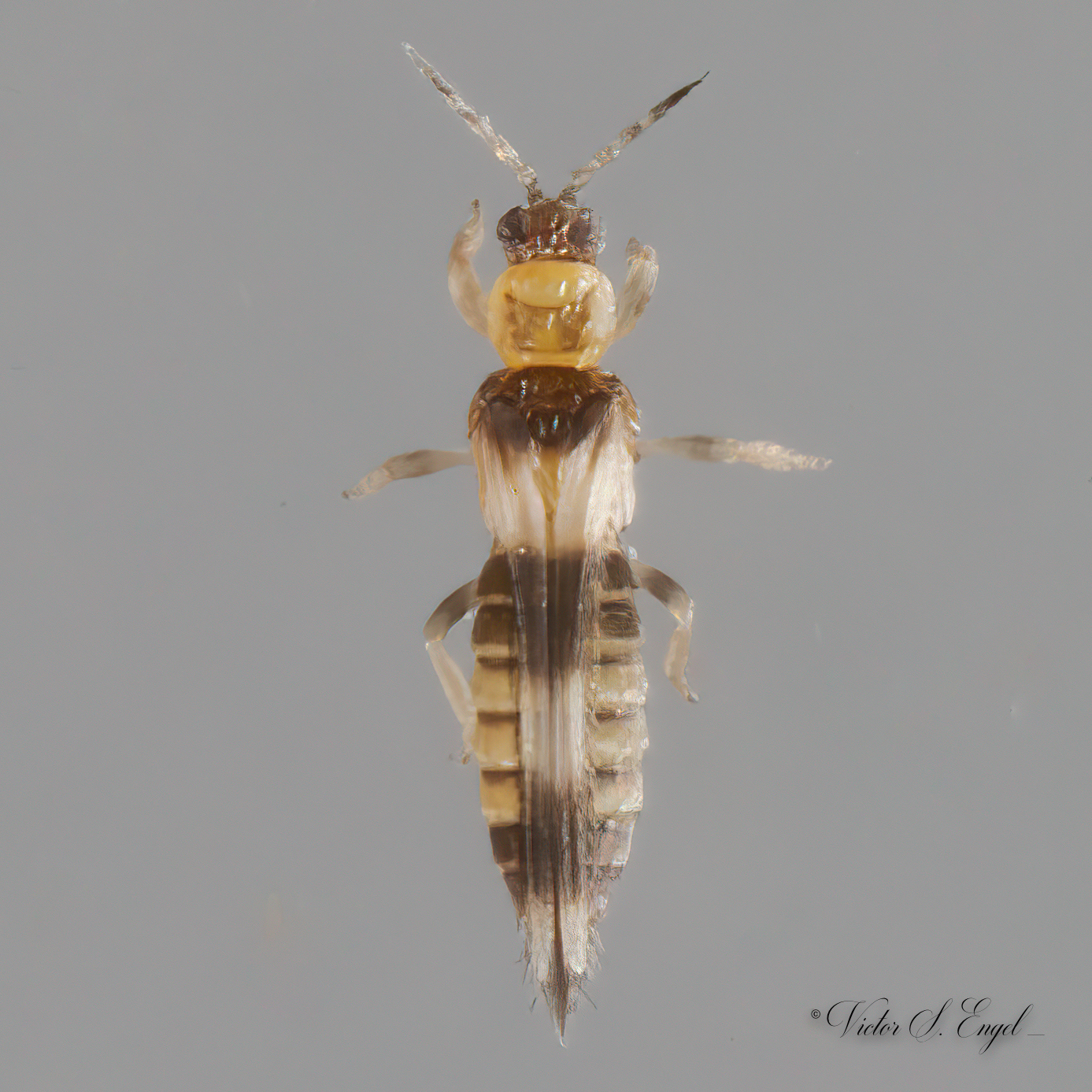

Scientific classification
- Kingdom: Animalia
- Phylum: Arthropoda
- Class: Insecta
- Order: Thysanoptera
- Family: Thripidae
- Genus: Neohydatothrips
- Species: N. variabilis

Binomial name
- Neohydatothrips variabilis (Beach, 1896)

= Neohydatothrips variabilis =

Species of thrips

Neohydatothrips variabilis, the soybean thrips, is a species of thrips in the family Thripidae. It is found in Central America and North America.
