= Thrips paradoxa =

Scientific classification
- Kingdom: Animalia
- Phylum: Arthropoda
- Class: Insecta
- Order: Thysanoptera
- Family: Thripidae
- Genus: Thrips
- Species: T. paradoxa

Binomial name
- Thrips paradoxa Linnaeus, 1758

Species of thrip

Thrips paradoxa is a species of common thrip in the family Thripidae.
