= Sorghothrips jonnaphilus =

Scientific classification
- Domain: Eukaryota
- Kingdom: Animalia
- Phylum: Arthropoda
- Class: Insecta
- Order: Thysanoptera
- Family: Thripidae
- Genus: Sorghothrips
- Species: S. jonnaphilus

Binomial name
- Sorghothrips jonnaphilus (Ramakrishna, 1928)

Synonyms
- Taeniothrips jonnaphilus

Species of thrips

Sorghothrips jonnaphilus is a species of thrips. It is a pest of millets.
