= Taeniothrips =

Scientific classification
- Kingdom: Animalia
- Phylum: Arthropoda
- Class: Insecta
- Order: Thysanoptera
- Family: Thripidae
- Genus: Taeniothrips; Amyot & Serville, 1843

Genus of insects

Taeniothrips is a genus of insects belonging to the family Thripidae.

The genus has almost cosmopolitan distribution.

Species:

- Taeniothrips amomi Priesner, 1938
- Taeniothrips angustiglandus Han & Cui, 1992
