= Thrips angusticeps =

Scientific classification
- Kingdom: Animalia
- Phylum: Arthropoda
- Clade: Pancrustacea
- Class: Insecta
- Order: Thysanoptera
- Family: Thripidae
- Genus: Thrips
- Species: T. angusticeps

Binomial name
- Thrips angusticeps Heinrich Uzel, 1895

Species of thrip

Thrips angusticeps is an insect of the order Thysanoptera and the family of Thripidae. It is a pest on crops of flax, cereals and peas.
