= Baliothrips =

Scientific classification
- Domain: Eukaryota
- Kingdom: Animalia
- Phylum: Arthropoda
- Class: Insecta
- Order: Thysanoptera
- Family: Thripidae
- Genus: Baliothrips; Uzel, 1895

Genus of insects

Baliothrips is a genus of insects belonging to the family Thripidae.

The species of this genus are found in Europe and Northern America.

Species:

- Baliothrips dispar (Haliday, 1836)
- Baliothrips kroli (Schille, 1912)
