= Neohydatothrips =

Scientific classification
- Kingdom: Animalia
- Phylum: Arthropoda
- Clade: Pancrustacea
- Class: Insecta
- Order: Thysanoptera
- Family: Thripidae
- Subfamily: Sericothripinae
- Genus: Neohydatothrips; John, 1929

Genus of thrips

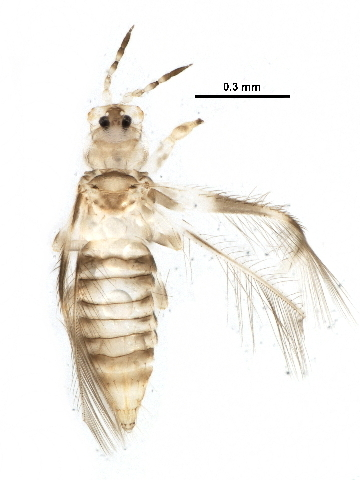
Neohydatothrpis Annulipes

Neohydatothrips is a genus of thrips in the family Thripidae. There are at least 30 described species in Neohydatothrips.

== Species ==
These species are members of the genus Neohydatothrips:

- Neohydatothrips albus (Jones, 1912)
- Neohydatothrips andrei (J. C. Crawford, 1943)
- Neohydatothrips annulipes (Hood, 1927)
- Neohydatothrips apicalis (Hood, 1927)
- Neohydatothrips baileyi (Hood, 1957)
- Neohydatothrips baptisiae (Hood, 1916)
- Neohydatothrips beachae (Hood, 1927)
- Neohydatothrips catenatus (Hood, 1957)
- Neohydatothrips chrysothamni (Hood, 1936)
- Neohydatothrips collaris (Hood, 1936)
- Neohydatothrips ctenogastris (Hood, 1936)
- Neohydatothrips desertorum (Hood, 1957)
- Neohydatothrips desmodianus (Stannard, 1968)
- Neohydatothrips ephedrae (Hood, 1957)
- Neohydatothrips floridanus (Watson, 1918)
- Neohydatothrips fraxinicola (Hood, 1940)
- Neohydatothrips gracilipes (Hood, 1924)
- Neohydatothrips interruptus (Hood, 1927)
- Neohydatothrips langei (Moulton, 1929)
- Neohydatothrips moultoni (Jones, 1912)
- Neohydatothrips nubilipennis (Hood, 1924)
- Neohydatothrips opuntiae (Hood, 1936)
- Neohydatothrips pedicellatus (Hood, 1927)
- Neohydatothrips portoricensis (Morgan, 1925)
- Neohydatothrips pulchellus (Hood, 1908)
- Neohydatothrips samayunkur (Kudo, 1995) (marigold thrips)
- Neohydatothrips sambuci (Hood, 1924)
- Neohydatothrips sensilis (Hood, 1936)
- Neohydatothrips setosus (Hood, 1927)
- Neohydatothrips spiritus (Hood, 1927)
- Neohydatothrips tiliae (Hood, 1931)
- Neohydatothrips tissoti (Watson, 1937)
- Neohydatothrips variabilis (Beach, 1896) (soybean thrips)
- Neohydatothrips vicenarius (Hood, 1955)
- Neohydatothrips zebra (Hood, 1940)
