= Kakothrips pisivorus =

Scientific classification
- Kingdom: Animalia
- Phylum: Arthropoda
- Class: Insecta
- Order: Thysanoptera
- Family: Thripidae
- Genus: Kakothrips
- Species: K. pisivorus

Binomial name
- Kakothrips pisivorus (Westwood, 1880)

Species of thrip

Kakothrips pisivorus, or the pea thrips, is a species of thrips native to Europe that lives in the flowers of peas and other legumes causing damage to the pods inside as they are developing.

== Description ==
The pea thrip is a brown insect 2 mm (0.08 in) in length with two pairs of feathery wings and yellowy legs. It feeds on the fruit of many legumes, including the pea plant, from which it takes its name. These thrips are generally identified by the damage done to pea pods as their larvae eat them.
