= Odontothrips =

Scientific classification
- Kingdom: Animalia
- Phylum: Arthropoda
- Class: Insecta
- Order: Thysanoptera
- Family: Thripidae
- Genus: Odontothrips

Genus of insects

Odontothrips is a genus of insects belonging to the family Thripidae.

The species of this genus are found in Europe and Southeastern Asia.

Species:

- Odontothrips aemulans Priesner, 1924
- Odontothrips ausralis Bagnall
