= Megalurothrips =

Scientific classification
- Kingdom: Animalia
- Phylum: Arthropoda
- Class: Insecta
- Order: Thysanoptera
- Family: Thripidae
- Genus: Megalurothrips; Bagnall, 1915

Genus of insects

Megalurothrips is a genus of thrips belonging to the family Thripidae.

The species of this genus are found in Old World and Australia.

Species:

- Megalurothrips basisetae Han & Cui, 1992
- Megalurothrips distalis (Karny, 1913)
- Megalurothrips equaletae Feng, Chao & Ma, 1999
- Megalurothrips flaviflagellus Mirab-Balou, Yang & Tong, 2014
- Megalurothrips formosae (Moulton, 1928)
- Megalurothrips guizhouensis Zhang, Feng & Zhang, 2004
- Megalurothrips haopingensis Feng, Chao & Ma, 1999
- Megalurothrips longus Hu QL & Feng JN, 2019
- Megalurothrips mucunae (Priesner, 1938)
- Megalurothrips peculiaris (Bagnall, 1918)
- Megalurothrips sinensis (Woo, 1974)
- Megalurothrips sjoestedti (Trybom, 1908)
- Megalurothrips sjostedti (Trybom, 1908)
- Megalurothrips typicus Bagnall, 1915
- Megalurothrips usitatus (Bagnall, 1913)
