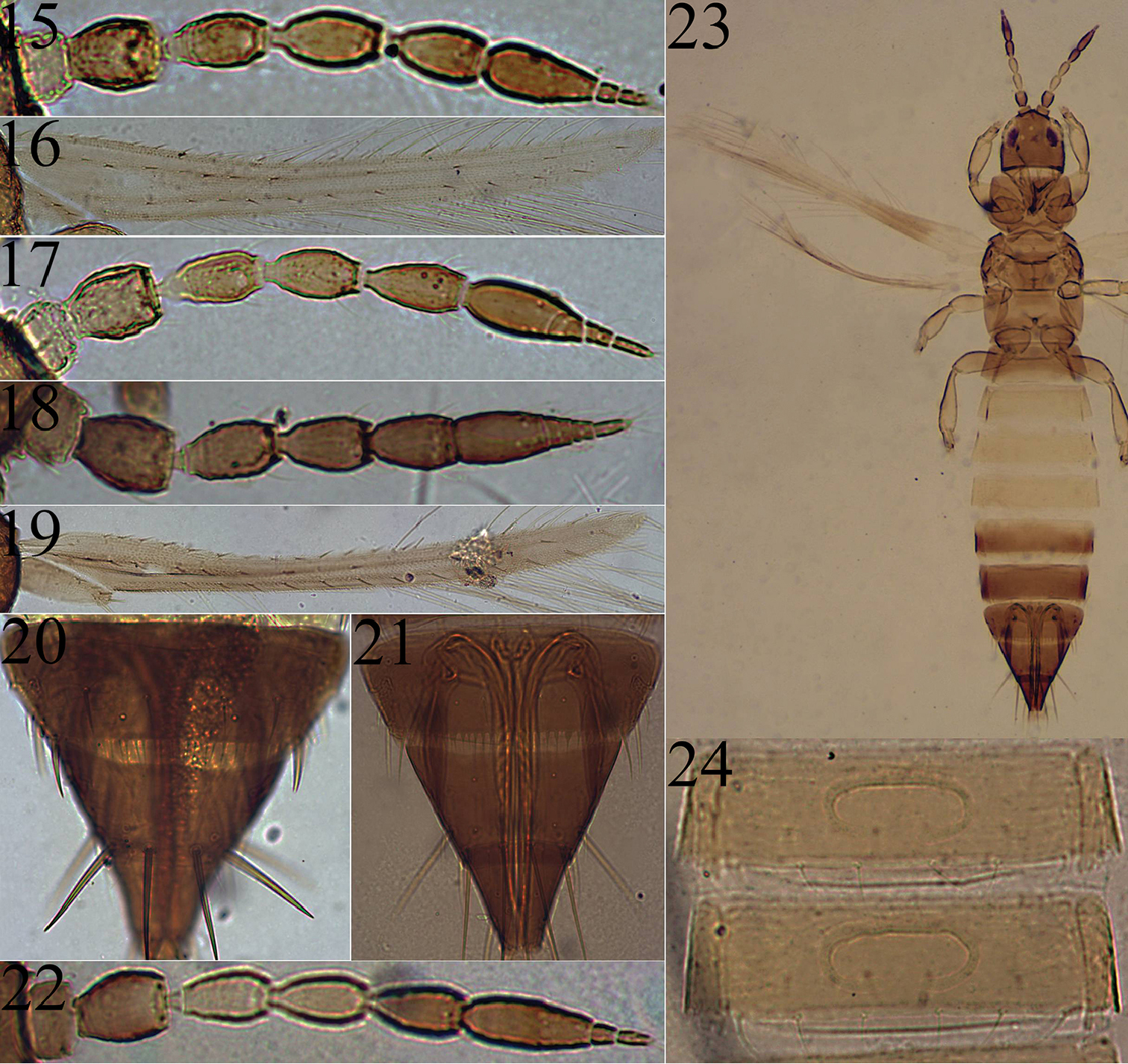
- Figs 15-24 from Xi & Wang, 2017

Scientific classification
- Kingdom: Animalia
- Phylum: Arthropoda
- Class: Insecta
- Order: Thysanoptera
- Family: Thripidae
- Subfamily: Thripinae
- Genus: Anaphothrips; Uzel, 1895

= Anaphothrips =

Genus of thrips

Anaphothrips is a genus of thrips belonging to the family Thripidae.

The genus was first described by Jindřich Uzel in 1895.

Species:

- Anaphothrips ambiguus (Girault, 1927)
- Anaphothrips astrolomi Pitkin, 1978
- Anaphothrips carlylei Girault, 1928
- Anaphothrips cecili Girault, 1928
- Anaphothrips cucurbiti Pitkin, 1978
- Anaphothrips dubius (Girault, 1926)
- Anaphothrips exocarpi Pitkin, 1978
- Anaphothrips incertus (Girault, 1929)
- Anaphothrips keatsi (Girault, 1926)
- Anaphothrips moundi Pitkin, 1978
- Anaphothrips newmani Moulton, 1935
- Anaphothrips obscurus (Müller, 1776)
- Anaphothrips occidentalis Pitkin, 1978
- Anaphothrips sudanensis Trybom, 1911
- Anaphothrips varii Moulton, 1935
- Anaphothrips woodi Pitkin, 1978
- Anaphothrips zealandicus Mound, 1978
