= Belothrips =

Scientific classification
- Kingdom: Animalia
- Phylum: Arthropoda
- Class: Insecta
- Order: Thysanoptera
- Family: Thripidae
- Genus: Belothrips; Haliday, 1836

Genus of insects

Belothrips is a genus of insects belonging to the family Thripidae.

The species of this genus are found in Europe and Northern America.

Species:

- Belothrips acuminatus (Haliday, 1836)
- Belothrips morio Reuter, 1901
