= Oxythrips =

Scientific classification
- Kingdom: Animalia
- Phylum: Arthropoda
- Class: Insecta
- Order: Thysanoptera
- Family: Thripidae
- Genus: Oxythrips; Uzel, 1895

Genus of insects

Oxythrips is a genus of insects belonging to the family Thripidae.

The species of this genus are found in Europe, Central Asia and Northern America.

Species:

- Oxythrips ajugae Uzel, 1895
- Oxythrips altaicus Pelikan, 1990
