= Apterothrips =

Scientific classification
- Kingdom: Animalia
- Phylum: Arthropoda
- Class: Insecta
- Order: Thysanoptera
- Family: Thripidae
- Genus: Apterothrips; Bagnall, 1908

Genus of insects

Apterothrips is a genus of insects belonging to the family Thripidae.

The species of this genus are found in Europe, Australia and Northern America.

Species:

- Apterothrips apteris (Daniel, 1904)
- Apterothrips secticornis (Trybom, 1896)
