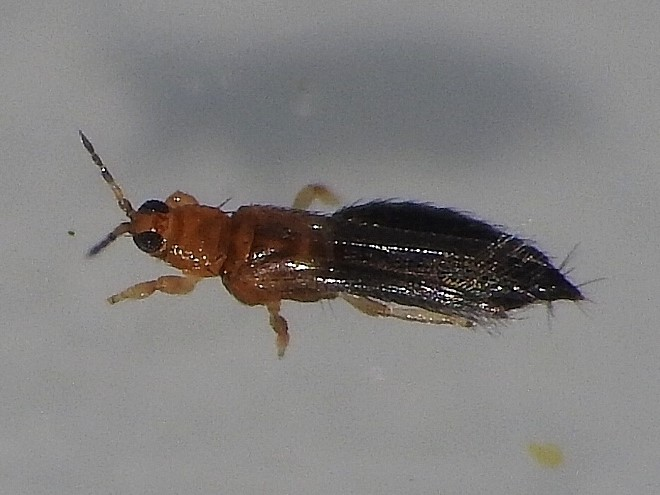

Scientific classification
- Kingdom: Animalia
- Phylum: Arthropoda
- Class: Insecta
- Order: Thysanoptera
- Family: Thripidae
- Genus: Thrips
- Species: T. hawaiiensis

Binomial name
- Thrips hawaiiensis Morgan, 1913

= Thrips hawaiiensis =

Species of thrips

Thrips hawaiiensis is a species of thrips. It is a pest of sorghum in Asia.
