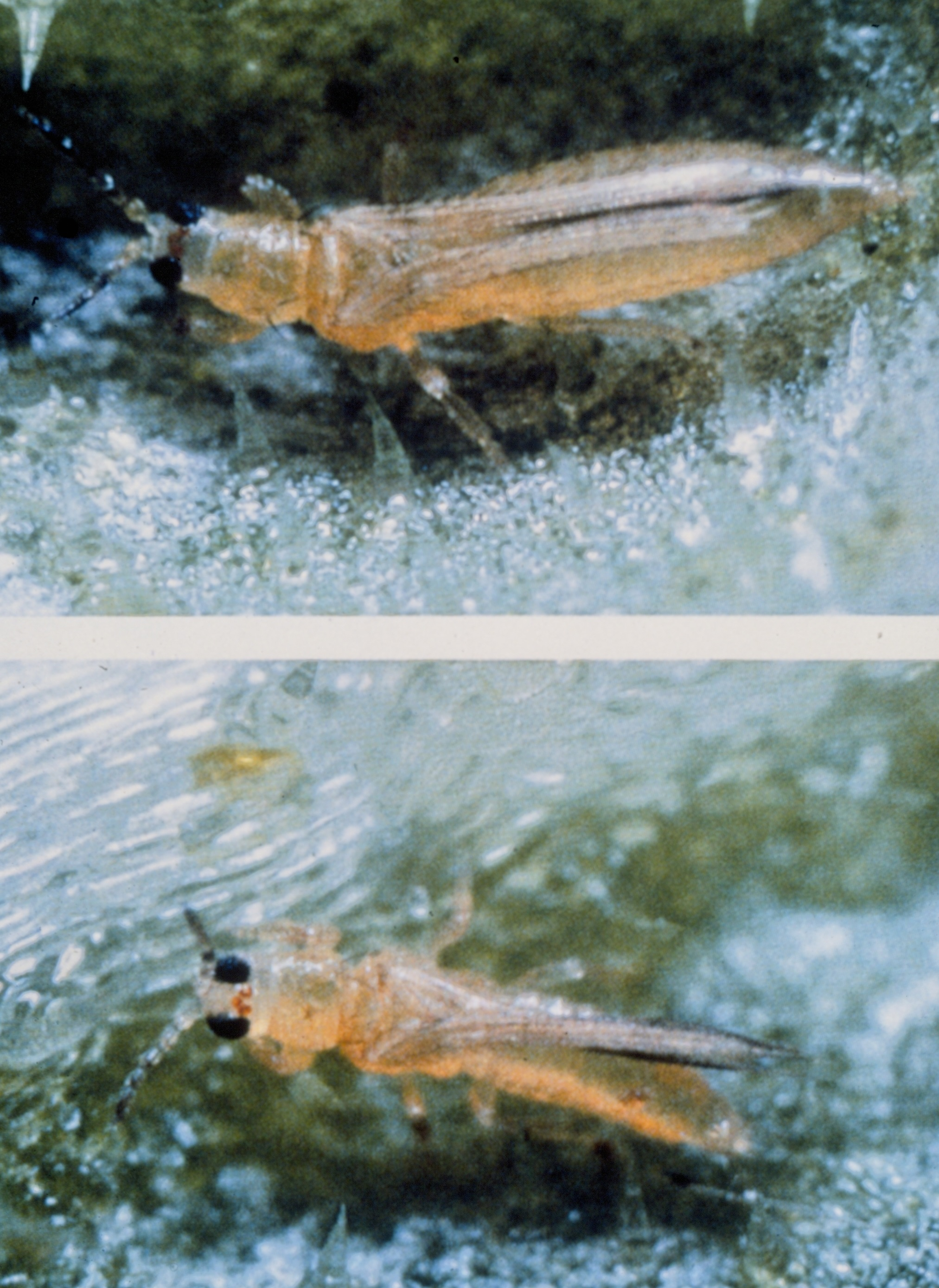

Scientific classification
- Domain: Eukaryota
- Kingdom: Animalia
- Phylum: Arthropoda
- Class: Insecta
- Order: Thysanoptera
- Family: Thripidae
- Genus: Thrips
- Species: T. palmi

Binomial name
- Thrips palmi Karny, 1925

= Thrips palmi =

Species of thrip

Thrips palmi is an insect from the genus Thrips in the order Thysanoptera. It is known commonly as the melon thrips.

It is a primary vector of plant viruses. The melon thrips can cause damage to a wide range of glasshouse ornamental and vegetable crops, particularly plants in the families Cucurbitaceae and Solanaceae, such as cucumber, aubergine, tomato and sweet pepper.

Adults and nymphs feed by sucking the cell contents from leaves, stems, flowers and the surface of fruits, causing silvery scars and leaf chlorosis. Plants can be deformed and killed in heavy infestations. The pest almost certainly originated in Southeast Asia, but in recent decades it has been widely introduced and has been observed throughout Asia and the Pacific, Florida, the Caribbean, South America, Africa, and Australia.

In Europe there have been outbreaks of T. palmi on crops in protected cultivation, including several in the Netherlands since 1988 and one in southern England in 2000. These were eradicated. In 2004, there was a report of T. palmi on an outdoor crop in Portugal. Thrips palmi has the potential to introduce and spread several non-indigenous plant viruses of the genus Tospovirus, which includes tomato spotted wilt virus. Thrips palmi and the viruses it transmits are not established in Europe, but they continue to present a risk, especially to a wide range of glasshouse-grown crops, and have the potential to cause significant economic impacts. If the viruses were introduced to the UK with imported plant material, thrips species already present there may become vectors, facilitating their spread. T. palmi is a notifiable pest in the UK, and all susceptible material imported into the country is rigorously checked at points of entry by DEFRA Plant Health and Seed Inspectors.

Scientists in Japan report that significant reductions in larva and adult melon thrips occur when plants are illuminated with red light.
