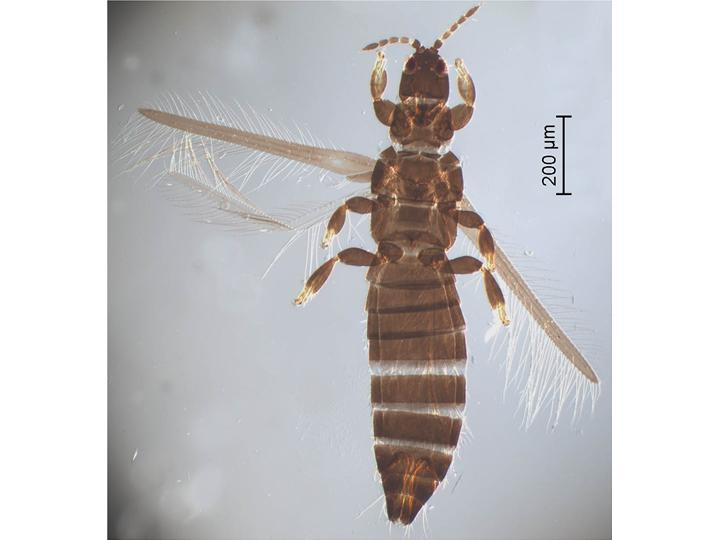
- Limothrips cerealium

Scientific classification
- Kingdom: Animalia
- Phylum: Arthropoda
- Clade: Pancrustacea
- Class: Insecta
- Order: Thysanoptera
- Family: Thripidae
- Genus: Limothrips; Haliday, 1836

Synonyms
- Albertothrips Shumser Singh, 1942; Microthrips Morgan, 1913; Pruthiella Shumser Singh, 1942; Sporangiothrips Daniel, 1985

= Limothrips =

Genus of insects

Limothrips is a genus of insects belonging to the family Thripidae.

The species of this genus are found in Europe, Australia and North America.

== Species ==
The following species are recognised in the genus Limothrips:

- Limothrips angulicornis Jablonowski, 1894
- Limothrips cerealium (Haliday, 1836)
- Limothrips clarus Solowiow, 1924
- Limothrips consimilis Priesner, 1926
- Limothrips denticornis (Haliday, 1836)
- Limothrips schmutzi Priesner, 1919
- Limothrips serotina Targioni-Tozzetti, 1891
- Limothrips transcaucasicus Savenko, 1944
- BOLD:AAG0733 (Limothrips sp.)
