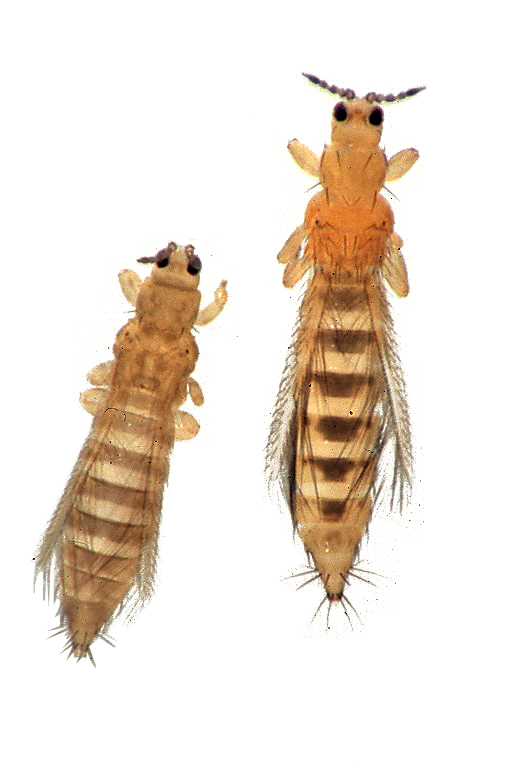
- Thrips tabaci (left); Frankliniella occidentalis (right)

Scientific classification
- Kingdom: Animalia
- Phylum: Arthropoda
- Clade: Pancrustacea
- Class: Insecta
- Order: Thysanoptera
- Family: Thripidae
- Genus: Thrips
- Species: T. tabaci

Binomial name
- Thrips tabaci Lindeman, 1889

Synonyms
- Limothrips allii Gillette, 1983; Thrips allii Sirrine & Lowe, 1894; Thrips bremnerii Moulton, 1907; Thrips dianthi Moulton, 1936; Thrips hololeucus Bagnall, 1914

= Thrips tabaci =

Species of thrip

Thrips tabaci is a species of very small insect in the genus Thrips in the order Thysanoptera. It is commonly known as the onion thrips, the potato thrips, the tobacco thrips or the cotton seedling thrips. It is an agricultural pest that can damage crops of onions and other plants, and it can additionally act as a vector for plant viruses.

== Description ==
In some populations, nearly all onion thrips are female, and males are very rare. The adult onion thrips is some 1 to 1.3 mm (0.04 to 0.05 in) long. The body is some shade of yellow, yellowish-brown or brown; the antennae have seven segments, the wings are well-developed and females have an ovipositor at the tip of the abdomen.

== Distribution and host range ==
The onion thrips is thought to have originated in the Mediterranean region but is now found on all continents except Antarctica. It infests a wide range of host plants that include onion, leek and garlic, brassicaceous plants such as cabbage, cauliflower and broccoli, asparagus, sugarbeet, melon, pumpkin, marrow and cucumber, strawberry, potato, tobacco, cotton and many fruiting and ornamental plants. Onion thrips was the first vector identified for tomato spotted wilt virus, being reported in 1927. There are now some identified populations of onion thrips that are not able to transmit tomato spotted wilt virus, possibly due to genetic spread in the global population.

== Life cycle ==
The female inserts her saw-like ovipositor into plant tissues and lays her eggs under the epidermis. The eggs are white at first, turning orange later, and hatch in four to five days. The larvae are white or yellowish and suck sap from the plant tissues. Two larval stages lasting about nine days in total are followed by the non-feeding prepupal and pupal stages which last four to seven days in total. The adult survives for two or three weeks during which time the females lay about eighty eggs. Most of the eggs are unfertilised and produced by parthenogenesis. In Hawaii, only about one in a thousand individuals is male, and in this location, it breeds throughout the year. In cooler climates it overwinters in plant debris and becomes active again in spring.

In populations from different areas, the ratio of males to females varies. A male to female ratio as high as 1 male to 2 females has been recorded from Central Spain, and 1 male to 6 females in Colorado. In contrast, counts as low as 1 male to 300 females have been recorded from Sudan, and in Hawaii a collection of over 5000 specimens held only 5 males in total. Some collections over the years from France, Japan, Taiwan and India have had no reported males at all. One study of the literature published in 1990 suggested a correlation between longitude and male population number, with the higher male counts occurring in the Western hemisphere.

== Damage ==
The onion thrips is the most serious insect pest attacking onion crops in the tropics. The thrips rasp and pierce the surface of the plant with their mouthparts, mostly choosing young plant growth. They then add digestive juices and suck up the fluids that seep from the wounds. As the plant part grows, so do the damaged regions, leaving silvery streaks. The more thrips that are present, the greater the area of plant damaged, reducing the area of foliage available for photosynthesis. At the same time, more water is transpired and pathogens can find a way to gain entry. In severely damaged plants, leaves may wither and the whole plant may appear silvery; the crop ripens prematurely but the yield is greatly reduced.

The onion thrips is a vector of certain plant viruses, including iris yellow spot tospovirus, strawberry necrotic shock virus, tobacco streak virus and tomato spotted wilt virus. It is also a vector of Alternaria porri, which causes the fungal disease known as purple blotch.
