= Dudley Moulton =

American entomologist

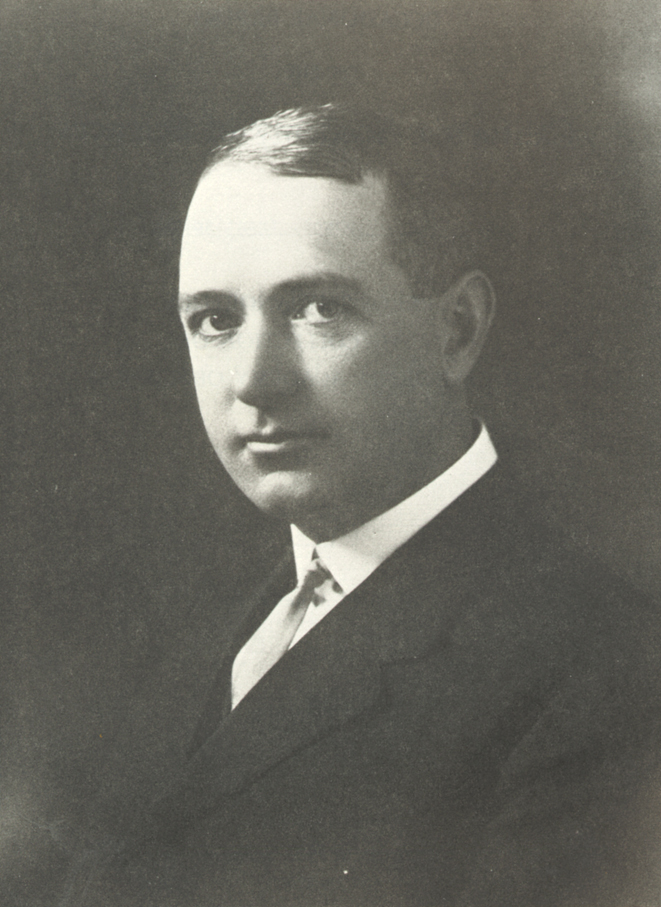

Dudley Moulton (28 December 1878 – 5 July 1951) was an American entomologist who specialized in the study of thrips while working as an entomologist on quarantine duty and later in administration of the department of agriculture in California.

Moulton was born in farming family in San Jose. He received an A.B. (1903) and M.A. (1906) from Stanford University, studying under Vernon Kellogg. He then worked as an entomologist for Santa Clara County for a couple of years before working for the quarantine department at San Francisco. He took an early interest in the pear thrip in 1904 at a time when it was a serious pest and later maintained an interest in thrips outside of his main professional work and asked his colleagues to collect for him. In 1909 he became Deputy State Commissioner of Horticulture for California. In 1931 he became director of the department of agriculture for the state of California. His thrip collections, which were finally placed in the California Academy of Sciences included 25,000 slides and about 10,000 specimens in alcohol. He died in 1951 at the home of his son in Pasadena. He was married to Maude who survived him along with two sons. He described many species of thrips.
