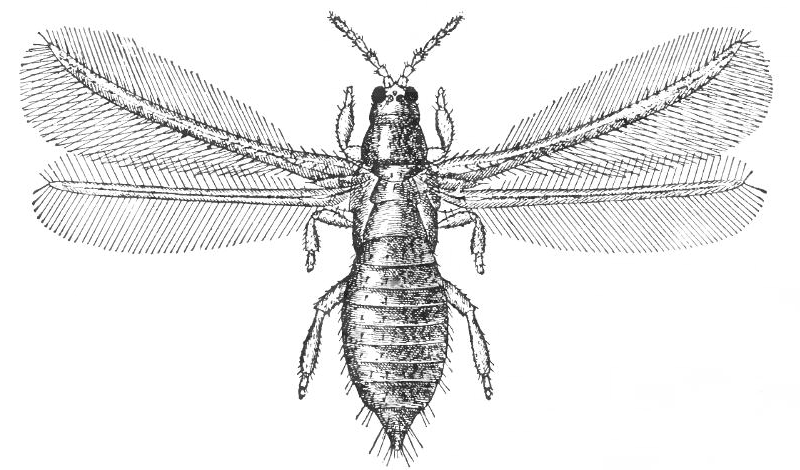
- Pear thrips (Taeniothrips inconsequens) imago

Scientific classification
- Kingdom: Animalia
- Phylum: Arthropoda
- Clade: Pancrustacea
- Class: Insecta
- Order: Thysanoptera
- Suborder: Terebrantia
- Family: Thripidae; Stephens, 1829

Diversity
- 4 subfamilies

= Thripidae =

Family of thrips

The Thripidae are the most speciose family of thrips, with over 290 genera representing just over two thousand species. They can be distinguished from other thrips by a saw-like ovipositor curving downwards, narrow wings with two veins, and antennae of six to ten antennomeres with stiletto-like forked sense cones on antennal segments III and IV.

They are considered to be among the more derived of thrips, having evolved many traits key to specializing as cryptophilous phytovores, living in the narrow spaces at the bases of leaves and within flowers.

Several species are economically significant pests, some of them invasive. Almost all of them are typical thrips which belong in the largest subfamily, the Thripinae.

== Systematics ==
Many of the divisions within the Thripidae are not based on common ancestry, but are instead based on common environment and morphological homoplasy, and these distinctions tend to be irrelevant to true phylogenetic relationships. As a result, many species of the Thripidae have undergone recent drastic taxonomic revision, splitting and promoting two tribes, Dendrothripini and Sericothripini, to subfamily status, with the possibility of greater reorganizations to come as modern phylogenetic methods and a more comprehensive morphological analysis provide additional evidence defining evolutionary relationships. This revision is probably necessary, as more than half of the genera in family Thripidae are monotypic, with the majority of monotypic species concentrated in subfamily Thripinae. However, a 2012 molecular phylogeny found that the Thripinae was paraphyletic; further work will be needed to clarify the relationships within the group.

=== Subfamilies ===
The Thripidae are thus ordered into four subfamilies:

- Dendrothripinae Priesner, 1925 (16 genera)
- Panchaetothripinae Bagnall, 1912 (38 genera)
- Sericothripinae Karny, 1921 (11 genera)
- Thripinae (227 genera)
