= Ankothrips yuccae =

Scientific classification
- Kingdom: Animalia
- Phylum: Arthropoda
- Class: Insecta
- Order: Thysanoptera
- Family: Melanthripidae
- Genus: Ankothrips
- Species: A. yuccae

Binomial name
- Ankothrips yuccae Moulton, 1926

Species of thrip

Ankothrips yuccae is a species of thrip in the family Melanthripidae. Its host plant is Yucca whipplei.

== Description ==
Both sexes are winged, with light brown to brown body, legs and antennae, with antennal segments 3-4 paler and forewings fuscous with its base a little bit paler. Its antennae has nine segments, the ninth longer the eight, sensoria transverse on the third- fourth, the second segment apex prolonged ventro-laterally into serrate lobe. Head with ocellar setae I arising on conical, slightly bifurcate tubercle, the third setae arise within ocellar triangle. It hears with 3 pairs of prominent postocular setae and the pronotum posterior margin with 5 pairs of prominent setae. Mesonotum has microtrichia, Metanotum striate medially, with median setae near posterior margin. The 8th abdominal tergite median setae scarcely 0.3 as long as tergite; tergite 10 with paired trichobothria well developed. Sixth sternite posterior margin with pair of lobes each bearing two setae at base.

== Ecology ==
Ankothrips yuccae breeds on Yucca whipplei without leaving major harm in California. It has no known vectors.
