= Myanmarothrips =

Myanmarothrips Temporal range: Cretaceous

Scientific classification
- Kingdom: Animalia
- Phylum: Arthropoda
- Class: Insecta
- Order: Thysanoptera
- Suborder: Terebrantia
- Family: Merothripidae
- Genus: †Myanmarothrips; Ulitzka, 2018

Genus of thrips

Myanmarothrips was a genus of thrips in the family Merothripidae.

Fossils are only found in Burmese amber.

== Species ==
- †Myanmarothrips pankowskiorum
