= Heterothrips aesculi =

Scientific classification
- Kingdom: Animalia
- Phylum: Arthropoda
- Class: Insecta
- Order: Thysanoptera
- Family: Heterothripidae
- Genus: Heterothrips
- Species: H. aesculi

Binomial name
- Heterothrips aesculi Watson, 1915

Species of thrip

Heterothrips aesculi is a species of thrips in the family Heterothripidae. It is found in North America.
