= Merothrips floridensis =

Scientific classification
- Kingdom: Animalia
- Phylum: Arthropoda
- Class: Insecta
- Order: Thysanoptera
- Family: Merothripidae
- Genus: Merothrips
- Species: M. floridensis

Binomial name
- Merothrips floridensis Watson, 1927

Species of thrip

Merothrips floridensis is a species of thrips in the family Merothripidae. It is found in the Caribbean Sea, Central America, North America, South America, and Europe.
