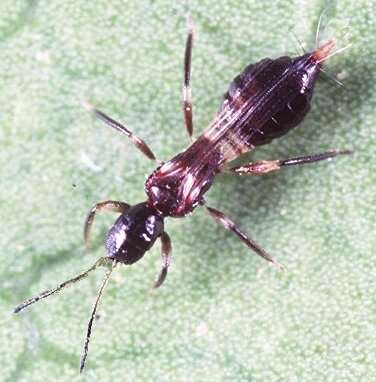
- Adult Franklinothrips vespiformis (Aeolothripidae), a widely distributed tropical species

Scientific classification
- Domain: Eukaryota
- Kingdom: Animalia
- Phylum: Arthropoda
- Class: Insecta
- Order: Thysanoptera
- Suborder: Terebrantia; Haliday, 1836

Families
- Adiheterothripidae Aeolothripidae Fauriellidae † Hemithripidae Heterothripidae † Jezzinothripidae † Karataothripidae Melanthripidae Merothripidae † Scudderothripidae Stenurothripidae Thripidae † Triassothripidae Uzelothripidae

= Terebrantia =

Suborder of thrips

Terebrantia is a suborder of thrips (order Thysanoptera). Order Thysanoptera includes 5,500 species classified into two suborders distinguished by the ovipositor. Terebrantia have a well-developed conical ovipositor, while the Tubulifera do not. It contains 13 families, five of which are only known from fossils. Members of Terebrantia mainly feed on plants. All have two larval instars followed by two pupal instars.

- Thysanoptera
  - Terebrantia
    - Melanthripidae
    - other Terebrantia
  - Tubulifera
    Phlaeothripidae
