= Advenathrips =

Scientific classification
- Kingdom: Animalia
- Phylum: Arthropoda
- Class: Insecta
- Order: Thysanoptera
- Family: Phlaeothripidae
- Genus: Advenathrips; Morris, Mound & Schwarz, 2000
- Species: A. inquilinus

Binomial name
- Advenathrips inquilinus Morris, Mound & Schwarz, 2000

Genus of thrips

Advenathrips is a genus of thrips in the family Phlaeothripidae, first described by Morris, Mound and Sdhwarz in 2000.

There is just one species in this genus: Advenathrips inquilinus, which takes its species epithet from the term inquiline, which describes the behaviour of this species and genus in that in breeding within the homes created by Dunatothrips species on the phyllodes of Acacia aneura there is no evidence of its harming the acacia. It also raises the offspring of the Dunatothrips species whose adults it has evicted.

It is found in the arid regions of New South Wales, South Australia, the Northern Territory, and Queensland.
