= Merothrips =

Scientific classification
- Kingdom: Animalia
- Phylum: Arthropoda
- Class: Insecta
- Order: Thysanoptera
- Family: Merothripidae
- Genus: Merothrips; Hood, 1912

Genus of thrips

Merothrips is a genus of thrips in the family Merothripidae. There are about 19 described species in Merothrips.

== Species ==
These 19 species belong to the genus Merothrips:

- Merothrips brevisetis Hood
- Merothrips brunneus Ward, 1969
- Merothrips cognatus Hood
- Merothrips dietrichi Schliephake
- Merothrips floridensis Watson, 1927
- Merothrips fusciceps Hood & Williams, 1915
- Merothrips indicus Bhatti & Ananthakrishnan, 1975
- Merothrips laevis Hood, 1938
- Merothrips mirus Crawford
- Merothrips morgani Hood, 1912
- Merothrips nigricornis Hood
- Merothrips plaumanni Crawford
- Merothrips productus Hood, 1938
- Merothrips tympanis Hood
- Merothrips williamsi Priesner, 1921
- Merothrips yii Ng & Mound, 2018
- Merothrips zondagi Ward, 1969
- † Merothrips balticus Ulitzka, 2015
- † Merothrips fritschi Priesner, 1924
