= Heterothrips =

Scientific classification
- Kingdom: Animalia
- Phylum: Arthropoda
- Class: Insecta
- Order: Thysanoptera
- Family: Heterothripidae
- Genus: Heterothrips; Hood, 1908

Genus of thrips

Heterothrips is a genus of thrips in the family Heterothripidae. There are more than 60 described species in Heterothrips.

== Species ==
These 64 species belong to the genus Heterothrips:

- Heterothrips aesculi Watson, 1915
- Heterothrips albipennis
- Heterothrips analis Hood, 1915
- Heterothrips angusticeps Hood
- Heterothrips arisaemae Hood, 1908
- Heterothrips auranticornis Watson, 1922
- Heterothrips australis
- Heterothrips azaleae Hood, 1916
- Heterothrips bicolor Hood
- Heterothrips borinquen Hood
- Heterothrips brasiliensis Moulton
- Heterothrips cacti Hood
- Heterothrips clusiae Hood
- Heterothrips condei Moulton
- Heterothrips cuernavacae Watson
- Heterothrips decacornis D.L.Crawford, 1909
- Heterothrips decoratus Hood
- Heterothrips eversi Stannard, 1958
- Heterothrips fimbriatus Hood
- Heterothrips flavicornis Hood
- Heterothrips flavidus Hood
- Heterothrips flavitibia Moulton, 1932
- Heterothrips gillettei Moulton, 1929
- Heterothrips hondurensis Retana-Salazar, 2009
- Heterothrips lankesteriensis Retana Salazar, 2009
- Heterothrips lasquerellae Hood, 1939
- Heterothrips limbatus Hood, 1925
- Heterothrips lyoniae Hood, 1916
- Heterothrips marginatus Hood
- Heterothrips mexicanus Watson
- Heterothrips miconiae Hood
- Heterothrips minor Hood
- Heterothrips moestus De Santis, 1966
- Heterothrips myrceugenellae Gallego, 1973
- Heterothrips nouragensis Ulitzka, 2004
- Heterothrips nouraguensis Ulitzka, 2004
- Heterothrips nudus Moulton
- Heterothrips obscurus
- Heterothrips ornatus Hood
- Heterothrips paulistarum
- Heterothrips pectinifer Hood, 1915
- Heterothrips pedicellatus
- Heterothrips peixotoa Del-Claro, Marullo & Mound, 1997
- Heterothrips peruvianus Hood
- Heterothrips pilarae
- Heterothrips prosopidis J.C.Crawford, 1943
- Heterothrips pubescens Hood
- Heterothrips quercicola J.C.Crawford, 1942
- Heterothrips salicis Shull, 1909
- Heterothrips sanctaecatharinae
- Heterothrips savanicus
- Heterothrips selici
- Heterothrips sericatus Hood, 1913
- Heterothrips spinosus Moulton
- Heterothrips stellae
- Heterothrips striatus Moulton
- Heterothrips trinidadensis Hood
- Heterothrips varitibia Moulton
- Heterothrips vernus Hood, 1939
- Heterothrips vitifloridus Bailey & Cott, 1954
- Heterothrips vitis Hood, 1916
- Heterothrips watsoni Bailey & Cott, 1954
- Heterothrips xolismae Hood, 1936
- † Heterothrips nani Schliephake, 2001
