= Ankothrips =

Scientific classification
- Kingdom: Animalia
- Phylum: Arthropoda
- Class: Insecta
- Order: Thysanoptera
- Family: Melanthripidae
- Genus: Ankothrips; Crawford, 1909

Genus of thrip

Ankothrips is a genus of thrip in the family Melanthripidae.

== Species ==
Catalogue of Life shows the following species as accepted within Ankothrips:

- Ankothrips aequalis Moulton, 1926
- † Ankothrips deploegi Nel et al., 2020
- Ankothrips diffractus Hood, 1924
- † Ankothrips dupeae Nel et al., 2020
- Ankothrips fissidens Trybom, 1910
- Ankothrips flavidus Pelikan, 1958
- Ankothrips gracilis Moulton, 1926
- Ankothrips mavromoustakisi Priesner, 1939
- Ankothrips niezabitowskii Schille, 1911
- Ankothrips notabilis Bailey, 1940
- Ankothrips robustus D.L.Crawford, 1909
- Ankothrips thuriferae Berzosa & Maroto, 1983
- Ankothrips vandykei Moulton, 1928
- Ankothrips yuccae Moulton, 1926
- Ankothrips zayandicus Minaei, Haftbaradaran & Mound, 2012
