= Hispanothrips =

Hispanothrips Temporal range: 105.3–99.7 Ma Early Cretaceous

Scientific classification
- Kingdom: Animalia
- Phylum: Arthropoda
- Class: Insecta
- Order: Thysanoptera
- Family: Stenurothripidae
- Genus: †Hispanothrips; Peñalver and Nel 2010

Genus of thrips

Hispanothrips is an extinct genus of thrips in the family Stenurothripidae.

Fossils are only found in Spanish amber, collected at San Just.

== Species ==
- †Hispanothrips utrillensis
