= Wilkiea kaarruana =

Scientific classification
- Kingdom: Plantae
- Clade: Tracheophytes
- Clade: Angiosperms
- Clade: Magnoliids
- Order: Laurales
- Family: Monimiaceae
- Genus: Wilkiea
- Species: W. kaarruana

Binomial name
- Wilkiea kaarruana Zich & A.J.Ford

Species of tree

Wilkiea kaarruana is a species of flowering plant in the family Monimiaceae, and is endemic to northern Queensland. It is a shrub or small tree with elliptic to oblong leaves, and male and female flowers on separate plants, each with 4 to 6 tepals. Male flowers usually have 2 pairs of stamens and female flowers have about 21 to 26 carpels.

== Description ==
Wilkiea kaarruana is a shrub or small tree that typically grows to a height of 5–12 m (16–39 ft) and has thick, corky, fissured bark. Its leaves are elliptic to oblong, 60–150 mm (2.4–5.9 in) long and 25–60 mm (0.98–2.36 in) wide on a petiole 5–12 mm (0.20–0.47 in) long. The leaves are glabrous and slaty-green on the upper surface. Male and female flowers are borne on separate plants with 4 to 6 tepals. Male flowers are borne in clusters of up to 15, 10–40 mm (0.39–1.57 in) long in leaf axils, on the ends of branches or on the sides of woody branches, each flower more or less spherical 2.0–3.5 mm (0.079–0.138 in) long on a pedicel 5–18 mm (0.20–0.71 in) long with 2 pairs of stamens. Female flowers are borne on the ends of branchlets in groups of 6 to 14, 30–50 mm (1.2–2.0 in) long, each flower more or less spherical, about 7 mm (0.28 in) in diameter, on a pedicel 11–24 mm (0.43–0.94 in) long, with 20 to 26 carpels. Flowering has been observed in October and November, but mature fruit have not been observed.

== Taxonomy ==
Wilkiea kaarruana was first formally described in 2011 by Frank Zich and Andrew James Ford, from specimens collected by Ford in the Wooroonooran National Park in 2007. The specific epithet (kaarruana) refers to Kaarru (pronounced "Kaa-roo") Creek, where several plants, and the first female examples, were found.

== Distribution and habitat ==
This species grows in mountainous rainforest in the Ngalba Bulal National Park, the headwaters of the Daintree River, on Mount Bartle Frere and in the catchment of the South Johnstone River in far north Queensland.
