= Wilkiea smithii =

- Herbaium specimen showing foliage and fruit

Conservation status
- Least Concern (NCA)

Scientific classification
- Kingdom: Plantae
- Clade: Tracheophytes
- Clade: Angiosperms
- Clade: Magnoliids
- Order: Laurales
- Family: Monimiaceae
- Genus: Wilkiea
- Species: W. smithii

Binomial name
- Wilkiea smithii Whiffin

Species of flowering plant

Wilkiea smithii is a species of flowering plant in the family Monimiaceae, and is endemic to north-eastern Queensland. It is a shrub or small, slender tree with elliptic or oblong leaves. Male flowers are borne in clusters of about 5 and have 8 tepals and 2 pairs of stamens and female flowers have 20 to 40 carpels. The fruit is a glaucous, purplish to black drupe.

== Description ==
Wilkiea smithii is a shrub or small, slender tree that typically grows to a height of 1.8–8 m (5 ft 11 in – 26 ft 3 in). Its leaves are elliptic or oblong 85–140 mm (3.3–5.5 in) long and 30–60 mm (1.2–2.4 in) wide on a petiole 8–12 mm (0.31–0.47 in) long. The midvein is prominent on both surfaces of the leaves. Male flowers are borne in leaf axils, in clusters of about 5, 15–30 mm (0.59–1.18 in) long, each flower more or less spherical to club-shaped, about 3 mm (0.12 in) in diameter on a pedicel 7–9 mm (0.28–0.35 in) long with 8 tepals and usually 2 pairs of stamens. Female flowers are borne in leaf axils or on the ends of branches in clusters of about 3, mostly about 15 mm (0.59 in) long, each flower more or less spherical, on a pedicel 5–8 mm (0.20–0.31 in) long, with 20–40 carpels. Flowering occurs from August to December, and the fruit is a glaucous purplish to black, oval drupe, 12–16 mm (0.47–0.63 in) long and 9–13 mm (0.35–0.51 in) wide.

== Taxonomy ==
Wilkiea smithii was first formally described in 2007 by Trevor Paul Whiffin in the Flora of Australia from specimens collected in 1995 by Bruce Gray. The specific epithet (smithii) honours Lindsay Stuart Smith "in recognition of his botanical contributions to Queensland rain forests.

== Distribution and habitat ==
This species grows in a drier rainforest at altitudes from 200 to 800 m (660 to 2,620 ft) from south of Cooktown to north of the Atherton Tableland in northeast Queensland.

== Conservation status ==
This species is listed as least concern in the Queensland Government's WildNet database. As of October 2026, it has not been assessed by the International Union for Conservation of Nature.
