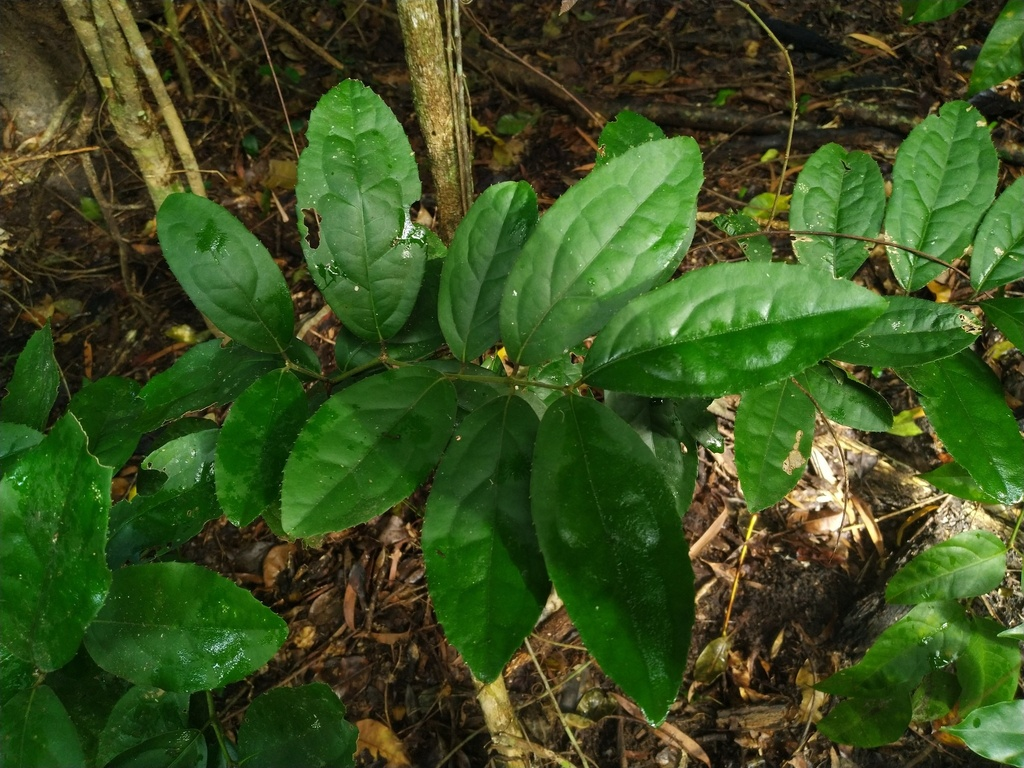
- In Cairns

Scientific classification
- Kingdom: Plantae
- Clade: Tracheophytes
- Clade: Angiosperms
- Clade: Magnoliids
- Order: Laurales
- Family: Monimiaceae
- Genus: Wilkiea
- Species: W. pubescens

Binomial name
- Wilkiea pubescens (Benth.) Whiffin & Foreman

Synonyms
- Kibara pubescens Benth.; Mollinedia pubescens (Benth.) F.Muell.; Tetrasynandra pubescens (Benth.) Perkins

= Wilkiea pubescens =

Species of tree

Wilkiea pubescens is a species of flowering plant in the family Monimiaceae, and is endemic to north Queensland. It is a shrub or small tree with elliptic leaves and male and female flowers on separate plants. Male flowers have 6 tepals and 2 or 3 pairs of stamens and female flowers have 2 pairs of tepals and 15 to 30 carpels. The fruit is a purplish-black drupe.

== Description ==
Wilkiea pubescens is a shrub or small tree that typically grows to a height of 5–7 m (16–23 ft). Its leaves are elliptic 45–120 mm (1.8–4.7 in) long and 20–50 mm (0.79–1.97 in) wide on a petiole 5–10 mm (0.20–0.39 in) long. The leaves sometimes have shallow serrations on the edges and the midvein is prominent on the lower surface. Male and female flowers are borne on separate plants. Male flowers are borne in leaf axils, sometimes in clusters of 3 to 5, 15–30 mm (0.59–1.18 in) long, each flower spherical 3–4 mm (0.12–0.16 in) in diameter with 6 tepals, on a pedicel 5–10 mm (0.20–0.39 in) long, with 2 or 3 pairs of stamens. Female flowers are borne in clusters of about 5, mostly 15–30 mm (0.59–1.18 in) long, each flower more or less spherical, 3–4 mm (0.12–0.16 in) in diameter on a pedicel 5–10 mm (0.20–0.39 in) long, with 2 pairs of tepals and 15 to 30 carpels. Flowering occurs from February to June, and the fruit is an oval, purplish-black drupe, 10–14 mm (0.39–0.55 in) long and 9–11 mm (0.35–0.43 in) wide.

== Taxonomy ==
This species was first formally described in 1870 by George Bentham and given the name Kibara pubescens in Flora Australiensis, from a specimen collected by John Dallachy near Rockingham Bay. In 2007, Trevor Paul Whiffin and Donald Bruce Foreman transferred the species to Wilkiea as W. pubescens in the Flora of Australia.

== Distribution and habitat ==
This species grows in rainforest or on the edges of rainforest or wet forest at altitudes up to 1,100 m (3,600 ft) and is widespread between Cooktown and Mount Elliott and possibly further inland.
