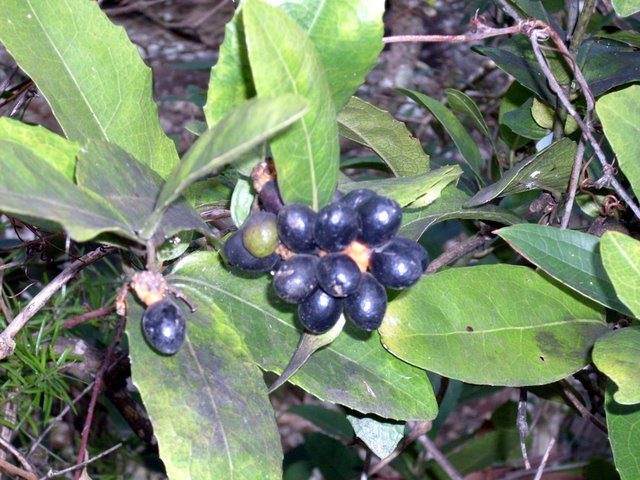
- Fruiting Wilkiea huegeliana at Barrenjoey, Australia

Scientific classification
- Kingdom: Plantae
- Clade: Tracheophytes
- Clade: Angiosperms
- Clade: Magnoliids
- Order: Laurales
- Family: Monimiaceae
- Genus: Wilkiea; F.Muell.

Species
- 12; see text

= Wilkiea =

Genus of flowering plants

Wilkiea is a genus of flowering plants in the family Monimiaceae, and is native to Australia and New Guinea. Plants in this genus are monoecious or sometimes dioecious trees and shrubs, the leaves with many fine oil dots, male and female flowers in cymes or panicles, and oval black drupes.

== Description ==
Plants in the genus Wilkeia are monoecious or dioecious trees or shrubs with sometimes toothed, papery to leathery leaves with many fine oil dots. The flowers are borne in leaf axils or on the ends of branchlets in cymes or panicles, usually with 3 to 9 flowers. Male flowers are more or less spherical, with 4 to 8 tepals usually with 4 to 8 stamens. Female flowers are flattened spherical, with minute tepals with many carpels with a short stigma. The fruit is an oval, black drupe about 15–20 mm (0.59–0.79 in) long.

== Taxonomy ==
The genus Wilkiea was first formally described in 1857 by Ferdinand von Mueller in the journal Transactions of the Philosophical Institute of Victoria. The first species he described (the type species), was W. calyptrocalyx, now known as Wilkiea macrophylla (Tul.) A.DC..

The genus appears to have an Australian or southern origin.

=== Species list ===
The following species of Wilkiea are accepted by Plants of the World Online as at April 2024:

- Wilkiea angustifolia (F.M.Bailey) Perkins – Queensland
- Wilkiea austroqueenslandica Domin – southeastern Queensland and northeastern New South Wales
- Wilkiea cordata Whiffin – northeastern Queensland
- Wilkiea foremanii Philipson – eastern New Guinea
- Wilkiea hugeliana (Tul.) A.DC. – southeastern Queensland and northeastern New South Wales
- Wilkiea hylandii Whiffin – northern Queensland
- Wilkiea kaarruana Zich & A.J.Ford – Queensland
- Wilkiea longipes (Benth.) Whiffin & Foreman – northern and northeastern Queensland
- Wilkiea macrophylla (Tul.) A.DC. – Queensland and New South Wales
- Wilkiea pubescens (Benth.) Whiffin & Foreman – northeastern Queensland
- Wilkiea rigidifolia (A.C.Sm.) Whiffin & Foreman – eastern New Guinea and Queensland
- Wilkiea smithii Whiffin – northeastern Queensland

=== Formerly placed here ===
- Pendressia wardellii (F.Muell.) Whiffin (as Wilkiea wardellii (F.Muell.) Perkins)
