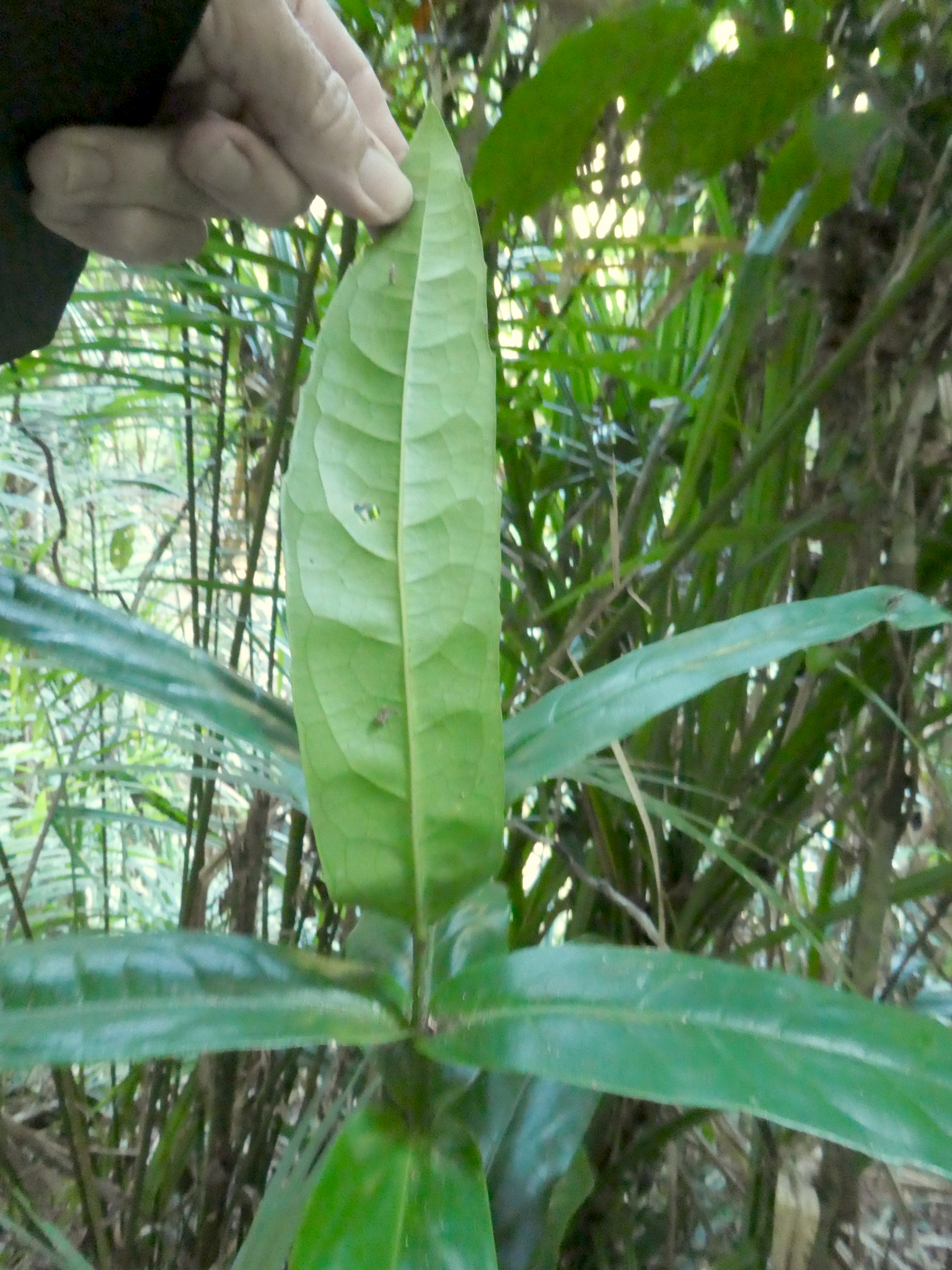
- In Babinda Boulders Scenic Reserve

Conservation status
- Least Concern (NCA)

Scientific classification
- Kingdom: Plantae
- Clade: Tracheophytes
- Clade: Angiosperms
- Clade: Magnoliids
- Order: Laurales
- Family: Monimiaceae
- Genus: Wilkiea
- Species: W. cordata

Binomial name
- Wilkiea cordata Whiffin

= Wilkiea cordata =

Species of flowering plant

Wilkiea cordata is a species of flowering plant in the family Monimiaceae, and is endemic to north-east Queensland. It is a shrub or small tree with oblong leaves, male and female flowers on separate plants, male flowers with stamens in 2 pairs, female flowers with about 25 carpels, and the fruit is an oval drupe with a yellow receptacle with an orange tinge.

== Description ==
Wilkiea cordata is a shrub or small tree that typically grows to a height of 1–4 m (3 ft 3 in – 13 ft 1 in). Its leaves are oblong, 110–260 mm (4.3–10.2 in) long and 30–90 mm (1.2–3.5 in) wide on a petiole 2–5 mm (0.079–0.197 in) long. The base of the leaves is heart-shaped to almost stem-clasping, the edges sometimes serrated and the midrib is prominent on both surfaces.

Male and female flowers are borne on separate plants. Male flowers are borne in leaf axils sometimes in clusters of up to 3, 10–15 mm (0.39–0.59 in) long, with 6 tepals, the individual flowers on a pedicel 4–8 mm (0.16–0.31 in) long, with stamens in 2 pairs. Female flowers are usually borne singly in leaf axils, or on the ends of branchlets, the flowers more or less spherical, 3–4 mm (0.12–0.16 in) long and 4–5 mm (0.16–0.20 in) in diameter, on a pedicel 5–15 mm (0.20–0.59 in) long, with about 25 carpels. Flowering occurs from January to March.

The fruit is a purplish-black or black drupe, 12–15 mm (0.47–0.59 in) long and 10–12 mm (0.39–0.47 in) wide, with a yellow fruiting receptacle tinged with orange.

== Taxonomy ==
Wilkiea cordata was first formally described in 2007 by Trevor Paul Whiffin in Flora of Australia, from specimens collected on Mount Haig.

== Distribution and habitat ==
This species of Wilkiea grows in the understorey of rainforest at altitudes from 100 to 1,250 m (330 to 4,100 ft). The natural range is from about Rossville south to the Atherton Tableland and Mount Bartle Frere.
