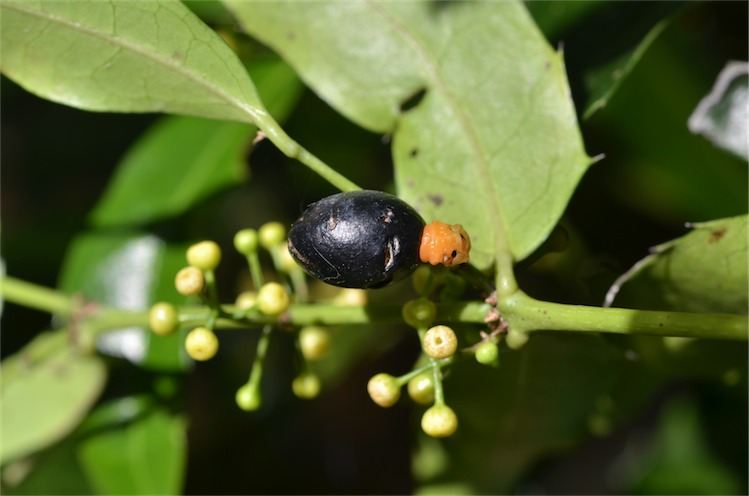
- Flowers and fruit

Scientific classification
- Kingdom: Plantae
- Clade: Tracheophytes
- Clade: Angiosperms
- Clade: Magnoliids
- Order: Laurales
- Family: Monimiaceae
- Genus: Wilkiea
- Species: W. austroqueenslandica

Binomial name
- Wilkiea austroqueenslandica Domin

= Wilkiea austroqueenslandica =

Species of shrub or tree

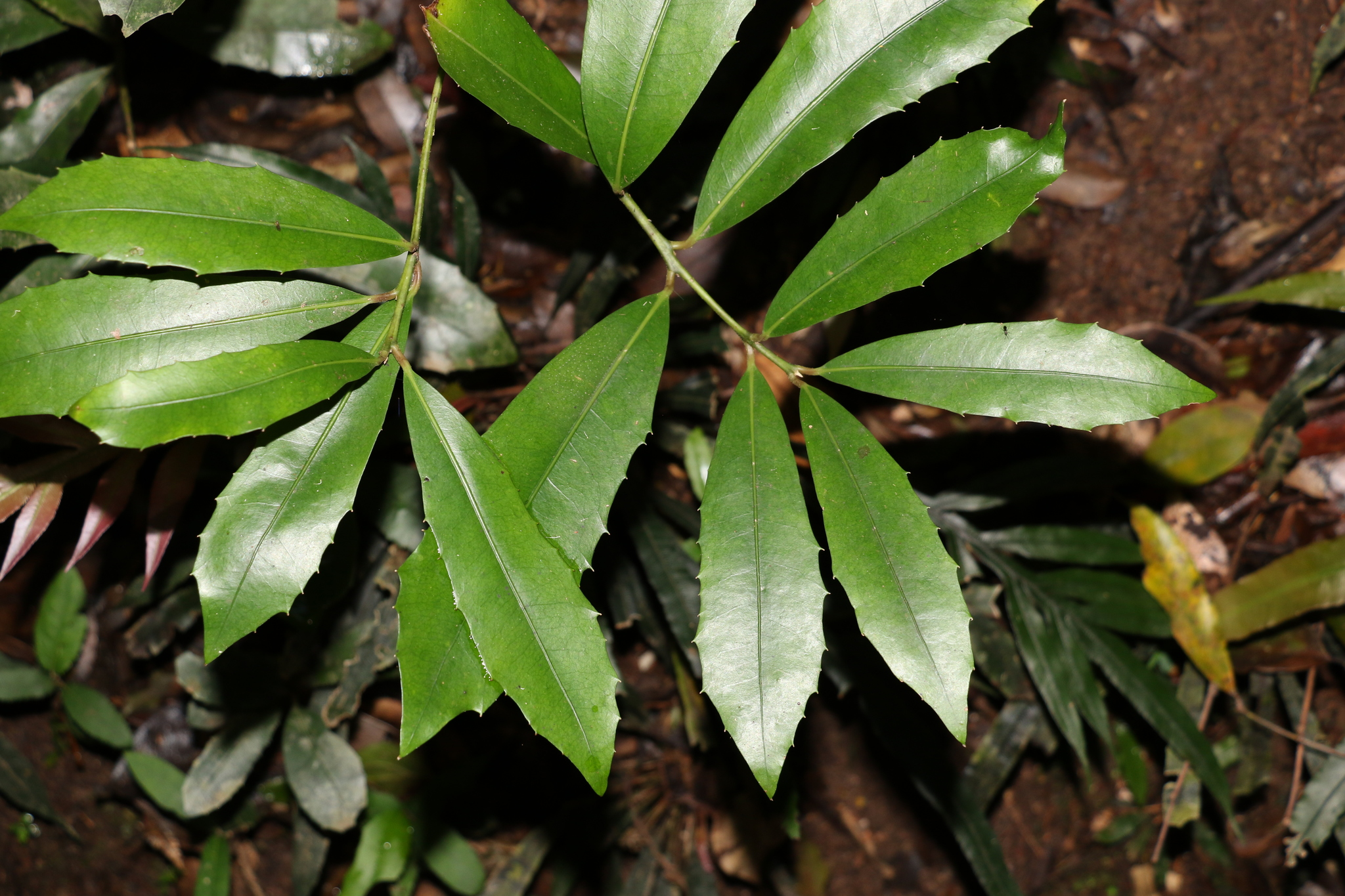
Foliage

Wilkiea austroqueenslandica, commonly known as smooth wilkiea or furry-flowered wilkiea, is a species of flowering plant in the family Monimiaceae, and is endemic to eastern Australia. It is a spreading shrub or small tree with egg-shaped to elliptic leaves, male and female flowers on separate plants, male flowers with about 30 stamens, female flowers with about 35 carpels, and the fruit is a glossy, olive-black drupe with an orange fruiting receptacle.

== Description ==
Wilkiea austroqueenslandica is a shrub or small tree that typically grows to a height of 1–5 m (3 ft 3 in – 16 ft 5 in). Its leaves are egg-shaped with the narrower end towards the base to elliptic, 60–210 mm (2.4–8.3 in) long and 20–70 mm (0.79–2.76 in) wide on a petiole 5–15 mm (0.20–0.59 in) long, the edges of the leaves irregularly toothed and with a prominent mid-vein. Male and female flowers are borne in leaf axils on separate plants, male flowers in clusters of 7–9, 20–30 mm (0.79–1.18 in) long, the individual flowers 4–5 mm (0.16–0.20 in) in diameter on a pedicel about 8 mm (0.31 in) long, with about 30 stamens. Female flowers are borne in clusters of 7–9, 30–50 mm (1.2–2.0 in) long, the individual flowers 5–7 mm (0.20–0.28 in) in diameter on a pedicel about 10–15 mm (0.39–0.59 in) long, with about 35 carpels. Flowering occurs from July to December and the fruit is a glossy, olive-black drupe, 15–22 mm (0.59–0.87 in) long and 10–15 mm (0.39–0.59 in) wide, with an orange fruiting receptacle 10–15 mm (0.39–0.59 in) in diameter.

== Taxonomy ==
Wilkiea austroqueenslandica was first formally described in 1926 by Karel Domin in Bibliotheca Botanica, from specimens collected on Tamborine Mountain.

== Distribution and habitat ==
This species of Wilkiea grows in rainforest at altitudes up to 850 m (2,790 ft) from the McPherson Range in south-east Queensland to the Richmond and Tweed Rivers in north-eastern New South Wales.
