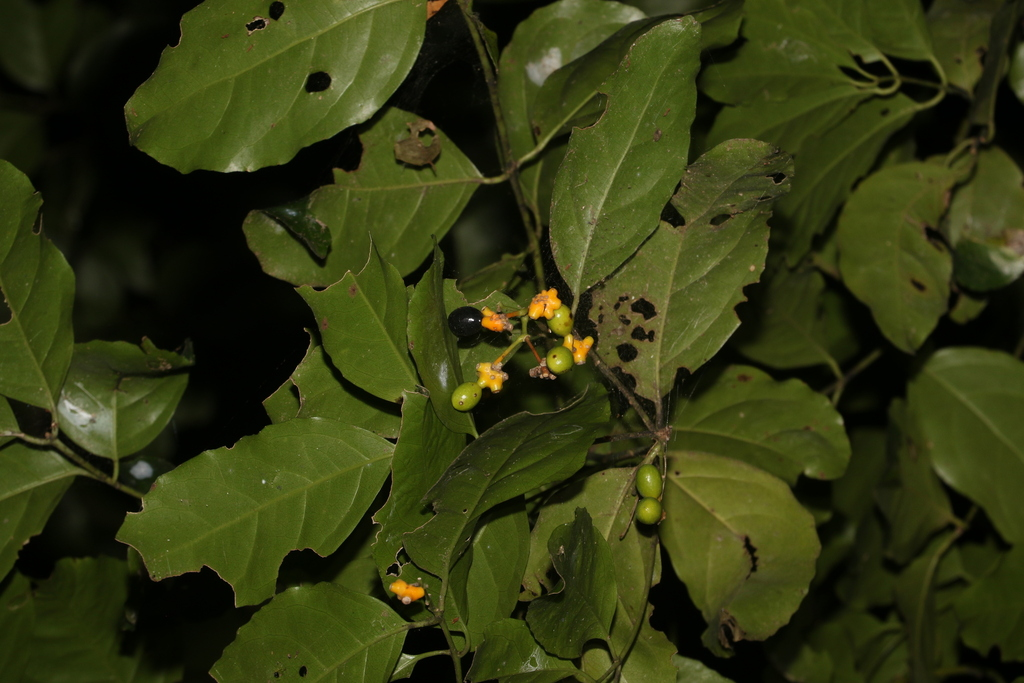
- Near Lake Eacham

Scientific classification
- Kingdom: Plantae
- Clade: Tracheophytes
- Clade: Angiosperms
- Clade: Magnoliids
- Order: Laurales
- Family: Monimiaceae
- Genus: Wilkiea
- Species: W. longipes

Binomial name
- Wilkiea longipes (Benth.) Whiffin & Foreman

Synonyms
- Kibara longipes Benth.; Mollinedia longipes (Benth.) F.Muell.; Tetrasynandra longipes (Benth.) Perkins

= Wilkiea longipes =

Species of tree

Wilkiea longipes is a species of flowering plant in the family Monimiaceae, and is endemic to northern Queensland. It is a shrub or small tree with elliptic to egg-shaped leaves with the narrower end towards the base, and male and female flowers on separate plants. Male flowers usually have 3 or 4 pairs of stamens and female flowers have about 9 to 13 carpels.

== Description ==
Wilkiea longipes is a shrub or small tree that typically grows to a height of 0.75–15 m (2 ft 6 in – 49 ft 3 in). Its leaves are elliptic to egg-shaped with the narrower end towards the base, 85–260 mm (3.3–10.2 in) long and 40–120 mm (1.6–4.7 in) wide on a petiole 8–20 mm (0.31–0.79 in) long. The leaves have scalloped edges and the midvein is prominent on the lower surface. Male and female flowers are borne on separate plants. Male flowers are borne in leaf axils, sometimes on woody branches, in clusters of 5 to 11, up to 8.5 mm (0.33 in) long, each flower club-shaped to spherical 2–3 mm (0.079–0.118 in) long with 4 pairs of tepals, on a pedicel 15–20 mm (0.59–0.79 in) long with 3 or 4 pairs of stamens. Female flowers are borne in leaf axils in groups of 3, mostly 3.0–4.5 mm (0.12–0.18 in) long, each flower more or less spherical, about 4 mm (0.16 in) in diameter on a pedicel 15–18 mm (0.59–0.71 in) long, with 9 to 13 carpels. Flowering occurs from November to May, and the fruit is a spherical to oval, black or dark blue drupe 12–16 mm (0.47–0.63 in) long and 10–13 mm (0.39–0.51 in) wide.

== Taxonomy ==
This species was first formally described in 1870 by George Bentham and given the name Kibara longipes from a specimen collected by John Dallachy. In 2007, Trevor Paul Whiffin and Donald Bruce Foreman transferred the species to Wilkiea as W. longipes in the Flora of Australia.

== Distribution and habitat ==
This species grows in rainforest and vine forest at altitudes from 10 to 850 m (33 to 2,789 ft) in north-east Queensland and on Cape York.
