= Dunatothrips =

Scientific classification
- Kingdom: Animalia
- Phylum: Arthropoda
- Class: Insecta
- Order: Thysanoptera
- Family: Phlaeothripidae
- Subfamily: Phlaeothripinae
- Genus: Dunatothrips; Moulton, 1942

Genus of thrips

Dunatothrips is a genus of thrips in the family Phlaeothripidae.

== Species ==
- Dunatothrips aneurae
- Dunatothrips armatus
- Dunatothrips aulidis
- Dunatothrips chapmani
- Dunatothrips gloius
- Dunatothrips skene
- Dunatothrips vestitor
