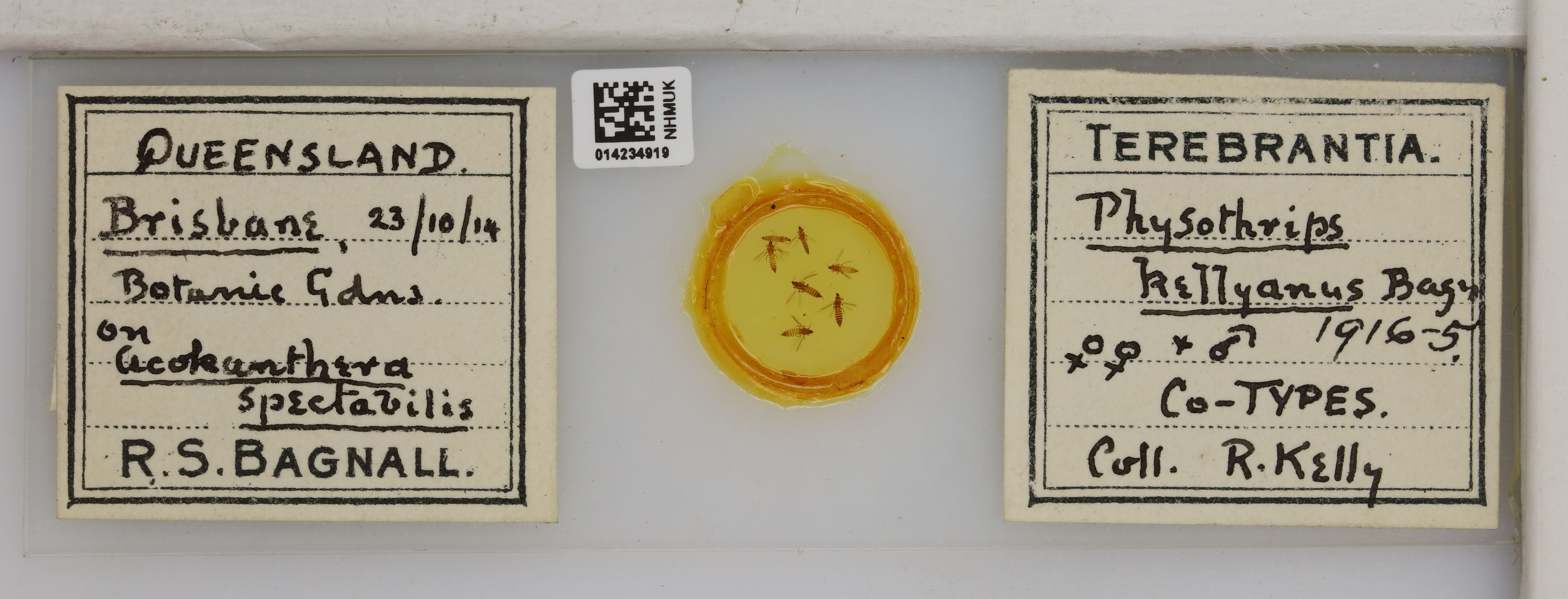
- Paralectotype specimens of Pezothrips kellyanus

Scientific classification
- Kingdom: Animalia
- Phylum: Arthropoda
- Class: Insecta
- Order: Thysanoptera
- Family: Thripidae
- Genus: Pezothrips
- Species: P. kellyanus

Binomial name
- Pezothrips kellyanus (Bagnall, 1916)

= Pezothrips kellyanus =

Species of thrips

Pezothrips kellyanus, also known as Kelly's citrus thrips, is a species of Thysanoptera (thrips) from the family Thripidae. It is known as a pest species on citrus fruit crops as it can cause scarring damage to fruit skins.

== First collection and description ==
The species was first described in 1916 as Physothrips kellyanus by Richard Siddoway Bagnall based upon examples from Australia collected by Reginald Kelly at Brandon, Queensland in 1914, Brisbane Botanic Gardens (now known as City Botanic Gardens) in 1914 and Ballerat, Victoria in 1915. Type specimen material collected by Kelly from Brandon and Brisbane is held in the collection of the Natural History Museum, London.

== Morphology ==
The adults of both sexes of P. kellyanus are brownish in colour, with the basal area of the forewings being lighter in colour. The female of the species was originally recorded as 1.6-1.8 mm long, and the male about 1.2 mm; a 2016 factsheet from the South Australia Research & Development Institute gives a range of about 1-2mm for adult size. The males have a more slender abdomen than females. The sixth antennal segment of males is noticeably longer than that of females.

== Life cycle ==
Pezothrips kellyanus is attracted to fragrant white or whiteish-yellow flowers on which to lay its eggs. Other than citrus, plant species which have been recorded as hosting breeding populations of P. kellyanus include jasmine Jasminum officinale and Japanese honeysuckle Lonicera japonica. Females of P. kellyanus lay their eggs on any part of flowers, but will also lay eggs on leaves and fruit. The species has two larval stages. When the host plant is citrus, the mature second instar larvae drop to the ground from the citrus canopy and the species pupates in soil or leaf litter. The length of time it takes for P. kellyanus to run through its life cycle is dependent on the time of season. P. kellyanus can develop up to six generations in a year.

== Crop damage and control ==
Pezothrips kellyanus tend to feed around the top of a fruit at the point of attachment, especially on citrus varieties that retain their sepals, where the thrips can be sheltered. As the fruit matures the feeding damage leaves a ring of silvery scarring on the skin of the fruit.

Although the scarring caused to citrus skins by P. kellyanus is cosmetic and does not affect the internal quality of the fruit, it can cause severe financial losses to farmers by marring the appearance of fruit and making crops less saleable. The species can be controlled by applying chemical control methods to disrupt its developmental stages, although this may also have a negative impact on beneficial insects which would otherwise predate on citrus crop pests.

== Distribution and origin ==
Despite Pezothrips kellyanus being first described from specimens found in Australia, other species from the genus Pezothrips are generally known from the southern Palearctic region and there is difference of opinion among Thrips researchers about whether P. kellyanus is native to Australia or is an introduced species. P. kellyanus has been found on a range of garden flowers besides citrus blossoms, and has been recorded on endemic Australian flowers at good distances from any citrus plantation. Genetic analysis has indicated more diversity in the Australian population of P. kellyanus than in populations sampled from Mediterranean countries or New Zealand, suggesting the species may have originated in Australia and been introduced elsewhere.

Pezothrips kellyanus has been observed in an agricultural context from many countries including from New Zealand (first recorded on citrus flowers at Auckland by K. P. Lamb in May 1950), Cyprus (first recorded at coastal citrus plantations at Limassol and Paphos in 1996) and Spain (first recorded in 1996 and observed on orchard fruits in 2005 and 2007). In Tunisia P. kellyanus was first recorded in orchards in 2008 and a later study in three orange-growing regions noted that 12.17% (19090 of 156700) of examined fruits bore damage from P. kellyanus. The species has also been recorded in Morocco, The United States, Chile, Israel, Croatia, France, Greece, Italy, Malta, Portugal, Turkey and New Caledonia.
