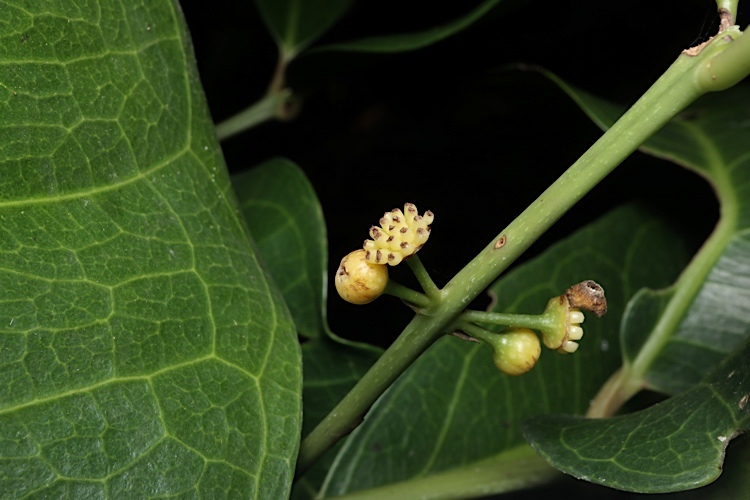
- Wilkiea macrophylla in the Australian National Botanic Gardens

Conservation status
- Least Concern (IUCN 3.1)

Scientific classification
- Kingdom: Plantae
- Clade: Embryophytes
- Clade: Tracheophytes
- Clade: Spermatophytes
- Clade: Angiosperms
- Clade: Magnoliids
- Order: Laurales
- Family: Monimiaceae
- Genus: Wilkiea
- Species: W. macrophylla

Binomial name
- Wilkiea macrophylla (A.Cunn.) A.DC.

Synonyms
- Hedycarya macrophylla A.Cunn.; Kibara macrophylla (A.Cunn.) Benth.; Mollinedia macrophylla (A.Cunn.) Tul.

= Wilkiea macrophylla =

Large-leaved wilkiea

Species of tree

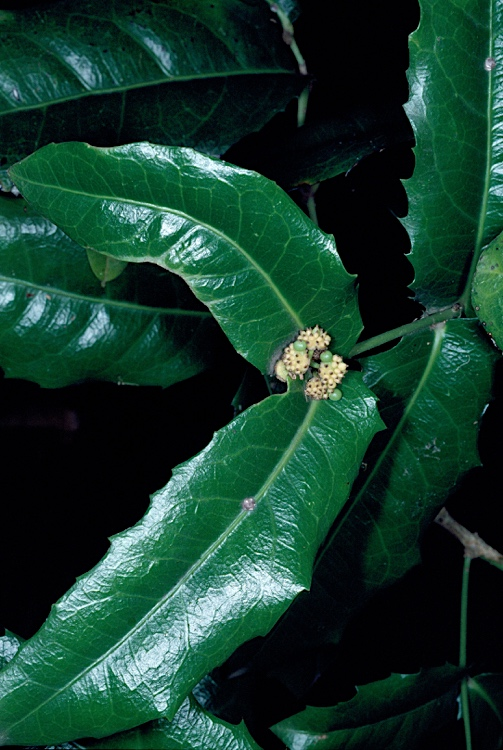
Leaves in the Booderee Botanic Gardens

Wilkiea macrophylla, commonly known as large-leaved wilkiea, is a species of flowering plant in the family Monimiaceae, and is endemic to north-eastern Australia. It is a glabrous shrub or small tree with narrowly to broadly elliptic leaves, and male and female flowers on separate plants. Male flowers have 2 pairs of tepals and usually 2 pairs of stamens, and female flowers have 6 or 7 pairs of tepals and 13 to 20 carpels. The fruit is a glossy purplish to olive black drupe.

== Description ==
Wilkiea macrophylla is a glabrous shrub or small tree, typically 1–6 m (3 ft 3 in – 19 ft 8 in) high. Its leaves are narrowly to broadly elliptic, sometimes broadly oblong, 65–240 mm (2.6–9.4 in) long and 20–90 mm (0.79–3.54 in) wide on a petiole 2–10 mm (0.079–0.394 in) long. The leaves are thick and leathery with the midvein prominent on both surfaces, and sometimes there are prominent teeth on the edges. Male and female flowers are borne on separate plants, male flowers in leaf axils in groups of 3 to 9, 10–15 mm (0.39–0.59 in) long, each flower oval, 2–3 mm (0.079–0.118 in) in diameter on a pedicel about 3 mm (0.12 in) long, usually with 6 tepals and 2 pairs of stamens. Female flowers are borne in leaf axils in groups of 7 to 9, about 15 mm (0.59 in) long, each flower flattened spherical, 3–4 mm (0.12–0.16 in) in diameter on a pedicel 4–6 mm (0.16–0.24 in) long with 6 or 7 pairs of tepals and 30 to 20 carpels. Flowering occurs from December to February, and the fruit is a glossy purplish- to olive-black drupe, 15–20 mm (0.59–0.79 in) long and 10–12 mm (0.39–0.47 in) wide.

== Taxonomy ==
This species was first formally described in 1838 by Allan Cunningham who gave it the name Hedycarya macrophylla in the Annals of Natural History. In 1868, Alphonse Pyramus de Candolle transferred the species to Wilkiea as W. macrophylla in Prodromus Systematis Naturalis Regni Vegetabilis.

== Distribution and habitat ==
Large-leaved wilkiea grows in rainforest from 510 to 610 m (1,670 to 2,000 ft) elevation, from central Queensland to the Richmond River in north-eastern New South Wales.
