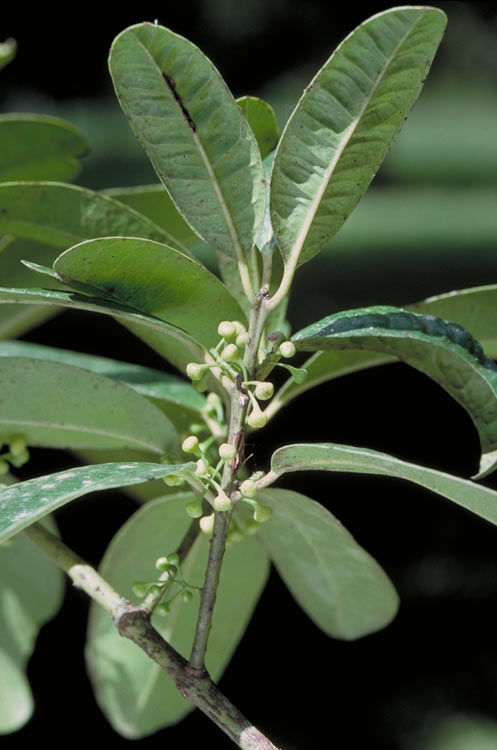
- Male flowers

Scientific classification
- Kingdom: Plantae
- Clade: Embryophytes
- Clade: Tracheophytes
- Clade: Angiosperms
- Clade: Magnoliids
- Order: Laurales
- Family: Monimiaceae
- Genus: Wilkiea
- Species: W. rigidifolia

Binomial name
- Wilkiea rigidifolia (A.C.Sm.) Whiffin & Foreman

Synonyms
- Kibara rigidifolia A.C.Sm.

= Wilkiea rigidifolia =

Species of tree

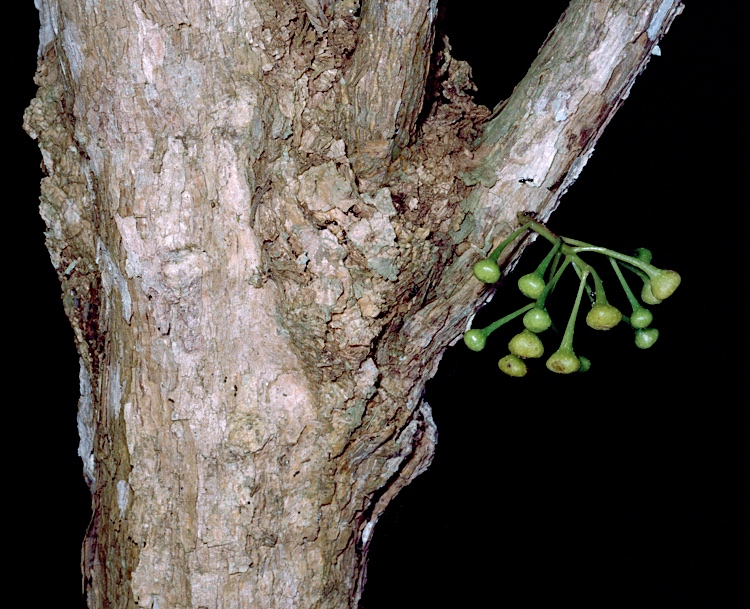
Cauliflory in Wilkiea rigidifolia

Wilkiea rigidifolia is a species of flowering plant in the family Monimiaceae, and is native to north Queensland and New Guinea. It is a shrub or small tree with elliptic to broadly elliptic or oblong leaves, and male and female flowers on separate plants. Male flowers are borne in clusters of 20 to 30, and have 4 pairs of tepals, and 2 or 3 pairs of stamens, and female flowers have 2 pairs of tepals, and 40 to 50 carpels. The fruit is a glossy black drupe.

== Description ==
Wilkiea rigidifolia is a shrub or small tree that typically grows to a height of 1.5–10 m (4 ft 11 in – 32 ft 10 in). Its leaves are elliptic to broadly elliptic or oblong 80–280 mm (3.1–11.0 in) long and 60–80 mm (2.4–3.1 in) wide on a petiole 10–25 mm (0.39–0.98 in) long. The juvenile leaves sometimes have serrations on the edges and the midvein is prominent on the lower surface of adult leaves. Male and female flowers are borne on separate plants. Male flowers are borne in leaf axils, sometimes on older wood, in highly branched clusters of 20 to 30, 35–40 mm (1.4–1.6 in) long, each flower more or less bell-shaped, 3–5 mm (0.12–0.20 in) in diameter with 4 pairs of tepals, each flower on a pedicel 7–9 mm (0.28–0.35 in) long, with 2 or 3 pairs of stamens. Female flowers are borne in clusters of about 3 to 9, mostly about 35 mm (1.4 in) long, each flower flattened spherical, 4–5 mm (0.16–0.20 in) in diameter on a pedicel 2–4 mm (0.079–0.157 in) long, with 2 pairs of tepals and 40–50 carpels. Flowering occurs from February to August, and the fruit is a glossy black, spherical to oval drupe, 10–15 mm (0.39–0.59 in) long and 8–12 mm (0.31–0.47 in) wide.

== Taxonomy ==
This species was first formally described in 1941 by Albert Charles Smith, who gave it the name Kibara rigidifolia in Journal of the Arnold Arboretum. In 2007, Trevor Paul Whiffin and Donald Bruce Foreman transferred the species to Wilkiea as W. rigidifolia in the Flora of Australia.

== Distribution and habitat ==
This species grows in a variety of habitats, from dry woodland to rainforest at altitudes up to 550 m (1,800 ft) on the Cape York Peninsula, in northeast Queensland and in the Western Province of Papua New Guinea.
