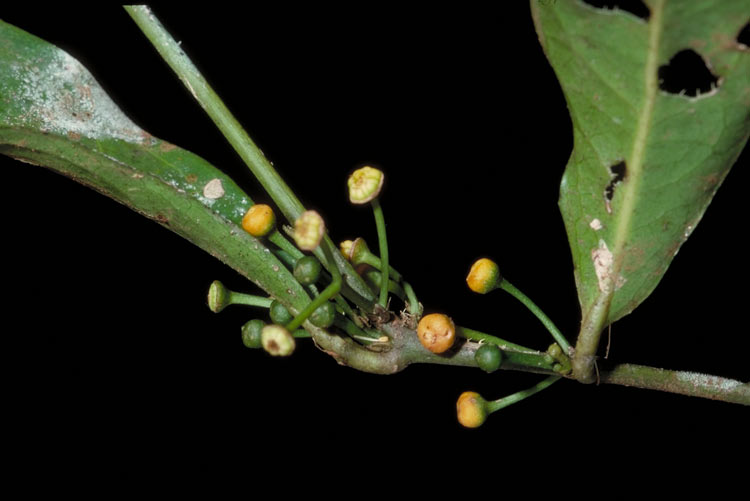
- Female flowers

Scientific classification
- Kingdom: Plantae
- Clade: Tracheophytes
- Clade: Angiosperms
- Clade: Magnoliids
- Order: Laurales
- Family: Monimiaceae
- Genus: Wilkiea
- Species: W. angustifolia

Binomial name
- Wilkiea angustifolia (F.M.Bailey) Perkins

= Wilkiea angustifolia =

Species of shrub

Wilkiea angustifolia is a species of flowering plant in the family Monimiaceae, and is endemic to Queensland. It is a dioecious shrub with elliptic leaves, male and female flowers on separate plants, male flowers with 4 stamens, female flowers with 8 to 20 carpels, and the fruit a purple to black drupe.

== Description ==
Wilkiea angustifolia is a shrub or small tree that typically grows to a height of up to 6 m (20 ft). Its leaves are narrow to broadly elliptic, 70–210 mm (2.8–8.3 in) long and 20–90 mm (0.79–3.54 in) wide on a petiole 3–10 mm (0.12–0.39 in) long, the edges of the leaves wavy or serrated. Male and female flowers are borne on separate plants, male flowers in leaf axils in clusters of 3 to 5, each flower on a pedicel about 10 mm (0.39 in) long with 4 stamens in 2 pairs. Female flowers are usually borne singly in leaf axils, 10–20 mm (0.39–0.79 in) long, sometimes with 2 or 3, or on the ends of branches on a pedicel 10–20 mm (0.39–0.79 in) long with 1 or 2 carpels and 4 to 13 ovules. Flowering occurs from November to May and the fruit is a purple to black, oval drupe, 10–18 mm (0.39–0.71 in) long and 8–10 mm (0.31–0.39 in) wide.

== Taxonomy ==
This species was first formally described in 1892 by Frederick Manson Bailey who gave in the name Mollinedia angustifolia, in the Botany Bulletin, Department of Agriculture, Queensland, from specimens collected on Mount Bellenden Ker "at or about 3,000 or 4,000 ft (910 or 1,220 m) elevation". In 1911, Janet Russell Perkins transferred the species to Wilkiea as W. angustifolia in Adolf Engler's Das Pflanzenreich. The specific epithet (angustifolia) means "narrow-leaved".

== Distribution and habitat ==
Wilkiea angustifolia grows in the understory of rainforest at altitudes between 100 and 1,585 m (328 and 5,200 ft) in north-east Queensland.

== Conservation status ==
This species is listed as of "least concern" under the Queensland Government Nature Conservation Act 1992.
