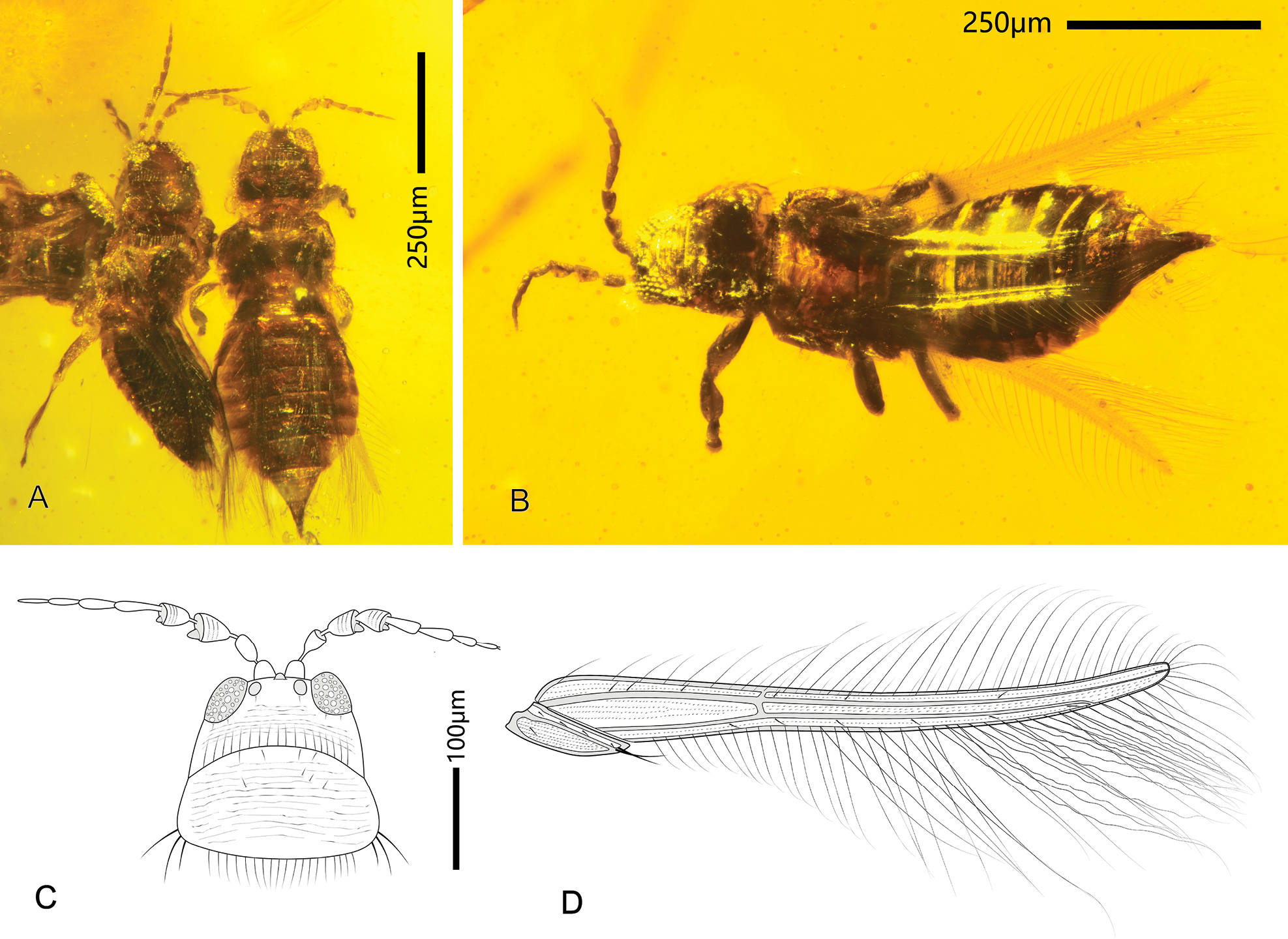
- Didymothrips abdominalis, Burmese amber (Late Cretaceous)

Scientific classification
- Kingdom: Animalia
- Phylum: Arthropoda
- Class: Insecta
- Order: Thysanoptera
- Family: Stenurothripidae; Bagnall, 1923

= Stenurothripidae =

Stenurothripidae Temporal range: Early Cretaceous–Present

Family of thrips

Stenurothripidae is a family of thrips belonging to the suborder Terebrantia in the order Thysanoptera. The oldest genera of this group are known from the Early Cretaceous Lebanese and Spanish San Just amber.

Genera:

- Cenomanithrips Tong, Shih & Ren, 2019
- Didymothrips Guo et al., 2024
- Heratythrips Mound & Marullo, 1998
- Hispanothrips Penalver & Nel, 2010
- Holarthrothrips Bagnall, 1927
- Oligothrips Moulton, 1933
- Opadothrips Priesner, 1924
- Parallelothrips Guo et al., 2024
- Stenurothrips Bagnall, 1914
