= Wilkiea hylandii =

Scientific classification
- Kingdom: Plantae
- Clade: Tracheophytes
- Clade: Angiosperms
- Clade: Magnoliids
- Order: Laurales
- Family: Monimiaceae
- Genus: Wilkiea
- Species: W. hylandii

Binomial name
- Wilkiea hylandii Whiffin

Species of tree

Wilkiea hugeliana is a species of flowering plant in the family Monimiaceae, and is endemic to Cape York Peninsula in far northern Queensland. It is a shrub or small tree with elliptic, sometimes toothed leaves, and male and female flowers on separate plants. Male flowers usually have 4 pairs of stamens and female flowers have about 40 carpels, and the fruit is a glossy black drupe with enlarged orange receptacles.

== Description ==
Wilkiea hugeliana is a shrub or small tree that typically grows to a height of 1.5–5 m (4 ft 11 in – 16 ft 5 in). Its leaves are elliptic, 80–150 mm (3.1–5.9 in) long and 30–55 mm (1.2–2.2 in) wide on a petiole 10–15 mm (0.39–0.59 in) long. The leaves sometimes have irregular teeth on the edges, with a prominent midvein on both sides. Male and female flowers are borne on separate plants, male flowers in leaf axils in groups of 5 to 7, about 15 mm (0.59 in) long, each flower spherical, 3–4 mm (0.12–0.16 in) in diameter on a pedicel 4–5 mm (0.16–0.20 in) long with 6 tepals and usually 4 pairs of stamens. Female flowers are borne on the ends of branchlets or in leaf axils in groups of 3 to 5, 30–50 mm (1.2–2.0 in) long, each flower more or less spherical, about 8 mm (0.31 in) in diameter and 11 mm (0.43 in) long, on a pedicel 7–15 mm (0.28–0.59 in) long, with about 40 carpels. Flowering occurs from September to December, and the fruit is a glossy black drupe with an enlarged orange receptacle.

== Taxonomy ==
Wilkiea hugeliana was first formally described in 2007 by Trevor Paul Whiffin, from specimens collected by Bernard Hyland in 1980. The specific epithet (hylandii) honours the collector of the type specimen, a longtime colleague and friend of Whiffin.

== Distribution and habitat ==
This species grows in rainforest from 400 to 600 m (1,300 to 2,000 ft) in altitude, and is endemic to an area around the McIlwraith Range on Cape York Peninsula in far north Queensland.
