= Dunatothrips aneurae =

Scientific classification
- Kingdom: Animalia
- Phylum: Arthropoda
- Class: Insecta
- Order: Thysanoptera
- Family: Phlaeothripidae
- Genus: Dunatothrips
- Species: D. aneurae

Binomial name
- Dunatothrips aneurae Mound, 1969

Species of insect

Dunatothrips aneurae is a tiny haplodiploid eusocial insect less than 3 millimetres (0.12 in) in length.

== Habitat ==
Dunatothrips aneurae lives on Acacia trees in the Australian Outback. They preferred east-facing, thin terminal phyllodes on the Acacia trees.

== Nests ==
For a nest to form, it requires a lone female to have male presence to initiate a domicile. They then construct them without male help before losing their wings on nesting by abscission.

The nests are made from a silk-like glue which the extract from their bottoms and some mature nests contain middens. If the nest is broken, usually only one or two individuals step up to repair it, and the rest of the individuals get to enjoy the benefits of a repaired nest.

== Mating ==
Male Dunatothrips aneurae engaged in short, truncated matings with their sisters before dispersing and mating with females in nearby nests.
