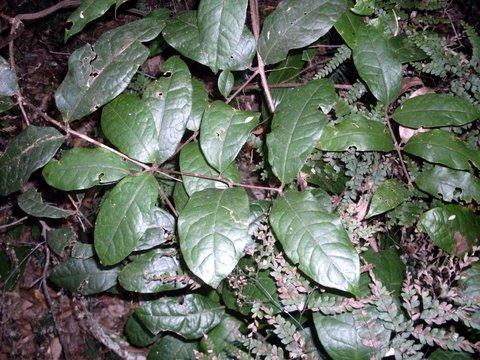
- Wilkiea hugeliana at Macquarie Pass National Park

Scientific classification
- Kingdom: Plantae
- Clade: Tracheophytes
- Clade: Angiosperms
- Clade: Magnoliids
- Order: Laurales
- Family: Monimiaceae
- Genus: Wilkiea
- Species: W. hugeliana

Binomial name
- Wilkiea hugeliana (Tul.) A.DC.

Synonyms
- Mollinedia huegeliana F.Muell. orth. var.; Mollinedia hugeliana Tul.; Wilkiea calyptrocalyx F.Muell.; Wilkiea huegeliana S.W.L. Jacobs & J.Pickard

= Wilkiea hugeliana =

Veiny wilkiea

Species of tree

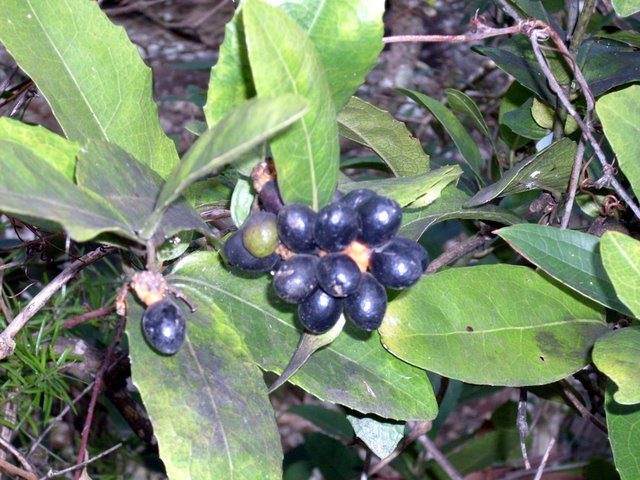
Fruiting Wilkiea hugeliana at Barrenjoey

Wilkiea hugeliana, commonly known as veiny wilkiea, common wilkiea or tetra beech, is a species of flowering plant in the family Monimiaceae, and is endemic to eastern Australia. It is a tall shrub or small tree with egg-shaped, oblong to narrowly elliptic leaves, and male and female flowers on separate plants. Male flowers have 3 or 4 stamens and female flowers have 20 to 40 carpels, and the fruit is a blackish oval drupe with a yellow to orange receptacle.

== Description ==
Wilkiea hugeliana is a tall shrub or small tree, typically 1–8 m (3 ft 3 in – 26 ft 3 in) high with a dbh of up to 10 cm (3.9 in). Its leaves are arranged in opposite pairs, egg-shaped, oblong to narrowly elliptic, 60–150 mm (2.4–5.9 in) long and 10–80 mm (0.39–3.15 in) wide on a petiole 5–12 mm (0.20–0.47 in) long. The leaves are leathery, have a prominent midvein and toothed edges.

Male and female flowers are borne on separate plants, male flowers in leaf axils in groups of 7 to 9, 20–25 mm (0.79–0.98 in) long, each flower spherical, 2–4 mm (0.079–0.157 in) in diameter on a pedicel 4–10 mm (0.16–0.39 in) long with 6 tepals and 3 or 4 stamens. Female flowers are borne on the ends of branchlets or in leaf axils in groups of 5 to 9, 25–30 mm (0.98–1.18 in) long, each flower more or less spherical, 4–6 mm (0.16–0.24 in) in diameter on a pedicel 5–10 mm (0.20–0.39 in) long with 20 to 40 carpels. Flowering occurs from September to February, and the fruit is a glossy bluish-black or glossy black drupe with a pale yellow to orange receptacle.

== Taxonomy ==
This species was first formally described in 1855 by Louis René Tulasne who gave it the name Mollinedia hugeliana in Annales des Sciences Naturelles. In 1868, Alphonse Pyramus de Candolle transferred the species to Wilkiea as W. hugeliana in Prodromus Systematis Naturalis Regni Vegetabilis.

== Distribution and habitat ==
The natural distribution is from Mount Dromedary (36° S) near Narooma in south eastern New South Wales to Maryborough (25° S) in south eastern Queensland. Veiny wilkiea grows in rainforest on the coast and ranges up to 900 m (3,000 ft), and has a preference for volcanic soils.

== Ecology ==
Wilkiea hugeliana is most likely pollinated by Thrips setipennis, a species of thrips. These insects have been found in both male and female flowers.
