= Merothripidae =

Merothripidae Temporal range: Barremian–Recent

Scientific classification
- Kingdom: Animalia
- Phylum: Arthropoda
- Class: Insecta
- Order: Thysanoptera
- Suborder: Terebrantia
- Family: Merothripidae; Hood, 1914

Family of thrips

Merothripidae is a family of thrips in the order Thysanoptera. There are at least 4 genera and 20 described species in Merothripidae.

== Genera ==
These four genera belong to the family Merothripidae:

- Damerothrips Hood, 1954
- Merothrips Hood, 1912
- † Jezzinothrips Strassen, 1973 Lebanese amber, Barremian
- †Myanmarothrips Ulitzka 2018 Burmese amber, Myanmar, Cenomanian
- † Praemerothrips Priesner, 1930 Baltic amber, Eocene
