= Adiheterothripidae =

Scientific classification
- Kingdom: Animalia
- Phylum: Arthropoda
- Clade: Pancrustacea
- Class: Insecta
- Order: Thysanoptera
- Family: Adiheterothripidae †

Family of insects

Adiheterothripidae is a family of thrips belonging to the order Thysanoptera.

Genera:

- Exitelothrips Strassen, 1973
- Neocomothrips Strassen, 1973
- Progonothrips Strassen, 1973
- Rhetinothrips Strassen, 1973
- Scaphothrips Strassen, 1973
- Scudderothrips Strassen, 1973
