= Heterothripidae =

Scientific classification
- Kingdom: Animalia
- Phylum: Arthropoda
- Class: Insecta
- Order: Thysanoptera
- Suborder: Terebrantia
- Family: Heterothripidae; Bagnall, 1912

Family of thrips

Heterothripidae is a family of thrips in the order Thysanoptera. There are about 6 genera and at least 70 described species in Heterothripidae.

== Genera ==
These six genera belong to the family Heterothripidae:

- Aulacothrips Hood, 1952
- Heterothrips Hood, 1908
- Lenkothrips De Santis & Sureda, 1970
- † Electrothrips Bagnall, 1924
- † Eocephalothrips Bagnall, 1924
- † Protothrips Priesner, 1924
