= Fauriellidae =

Scientific classification
- Domain: Eukaryota
- Kingdom: Animalia
- Phylum: Arthropoda
- Class: Insecta
- Order: Thysanoptera
- Family: Fauriellidae

Family of insects

Fauriellidae is a family of thrips belonging to the order Thysanoptera.

Genera:

- Fauriella Hood, 1937
- Opisthothrips Hood, 1937
- Parrellathrips Mound & Marullo, 1998
- Ropotamothrips Pelikan, 1958
