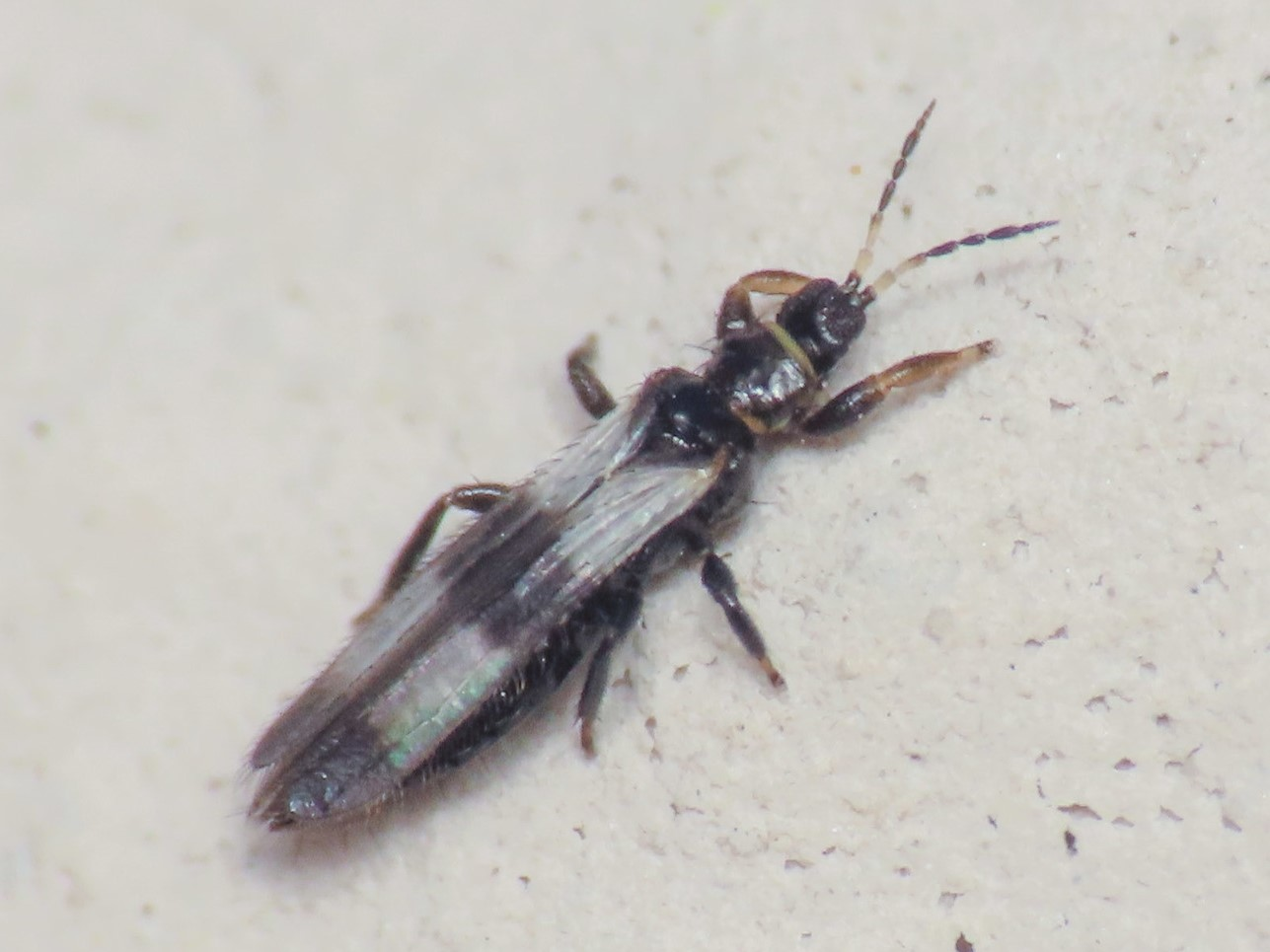
- Melanthrips ficalbii

Scientific classification
- Kingdom: Animalia
- Phylum: Arthropoda
- Class: Insecta
- Order: Thysanoptera
- Family: Melanthripidae; Bagnall, 1913

= Melanthripidae =

Melanthripidae Temporal range: Early Cretaceous–Present 110–0 Ma

Family of insects

Melanthripidae is a family of thrips belonging to the order Thysanoptera. Members of the family, covered with gymnosperm pollen, were found in Cretaceous Spanish amber about 110-105 million years old. They are believed to have been pollinators of the Ginkgoales.

Genera:

- Ankothrips Crawford, 1909
- †Archankothrips Priesner, 1924
- Cranothrips Bagnall, 1915
- Dorythrips Hood, 1931
- †Eocranothrips Bagnall, 1927
- †Gymnopollisthrips Peñalver, Nel & Nel, 1927
- Melanthrips Haliday, 1836
- †Proboscisthrips Ulitzka, 2017
