= Hordeum intercedens =

Scientific classification
- Kingdom: Plantae
- Clade: Tracheophytes
- Clade: Angiosperms
- Clade: Monocots
- Clade: Commelinids
- Order: Poales
- Family: Poaceae
- Subfamily: Pooideae
- Genus: Hordeum
- Species: H. intercedens

Binomial name
- Hordeum intercedens Nevski

Species of grass

Hordeum intercedens is a diploid, annual species of wild barley known by the common names bobtail barley and vernal barley. It is native to southern California and northern Baja California, where it is an increasingly rare member of the flora in saline and alkaline soils near seasonal waterflows and vernal pool habitats. Today most occurrences are located on the Channel Islands of California; many of the occurrences known from the mainland have been extirpated in the process of land development. This is an annual grass growing erect to bent in small tufts with stems up to 40 centimeters long. The inflorescence is a green spike up to 6.5 centimeters long made up of awned spikelets between 1 and 2 centimeters long.

Hordeum intercedens originated via long-distance dispersal of a southern South American Hordeum species to North America less than 1 million years ago. Its closest relatives are therefore not the other North American taxa like meadow barley or foxtail barley but the annual Hordeum euclaston occurring in Central and western Argentina and Uruguay. It is also only distantly related to the crop barley, from which the lineage leading to H. intercedens diverged about 12 million years ago. H. intercedens is one of the parental species of Hordeum depressum.

== Literature ==
- F. R. Blattner (2006). "Multiple intercontinental dispersals shaped the distribution area of Hordeum (Poaceae)". New Phytologist. 169 (3): 603–614. doi:10.1111/j.1469-8137.2005.01610.x. PMID 16411962.
- F. R. Blattner (2009). "Progress in phylogenetic analysis and a new infrageneric classification of the barley genus Hordeum (Poaceae: Triticeae)". Breeding Science. 69 (5): 471–480. doi:10.1270/jsbbs.59.471.
- T. Pleines & F. R. Blattner (2008). "Phylogeographic implications of an AFLP phylogeny of the American diploid Hordeum species (Poaceae: Triticeae)". Taxon. 57 (3): 875–881. doi:10.1002/tax.573016.
