= Hordeum patagonicum =

Scientific classification
- Kingdom: Plantae
- Clade: Tracheophytes
- Clade: Angiosperms
- Clade: Monocots
- Clade: Commelinids
- Order: Poales
- Family: Poaceae
- Subfamily: Pooideae
- Genus: Hordeum
- Species: H. patagonicum

Binomial name
- Hordeum patagonicum (Hauman) Covas

Synonyms
- Hordeum setifolium Parodi ex Nicora; Hordeum santacrucense Parodi ex Nicora; Hordeum patagonicum subsp. setifolium Hordeum patagonicum subsp. santacrucense Hordeum patagonicum subsp. mustersii Hordeum patagonicum subsp. magellanicum Hordeum mustersii Nicora; Hordeum maritimum var. patagonicum Hordeum chilense var. magellanicum Critesion setifolium (Parodi & Nicora) Á.Löve; Critesion santacrucense (Parodi & Nicora) Á.Löve; Critesion patagonicum (Hauman) Á.Löve; Critesion mustersii (Nicora) Á.Löve; Critesion magellanicum (Parodi & Nicora) Á.Löve

Species of grass

Hordeum patagonicum is a species of barley native to Argentina, where it can be found in inland wetlands, coastal and supratidal lands. This is a small annual grass forming petite patches of thin, hairy leaves and erect stems to about 10 cm height. First described by Lucien Leon Hauman, it received its current name by Guillermo Covas. H. patagonicum is included in the same family as grass. No subspecies are listed in the Catalog of Life.
