= Highland barley =

Landrace of barley native to Tibet

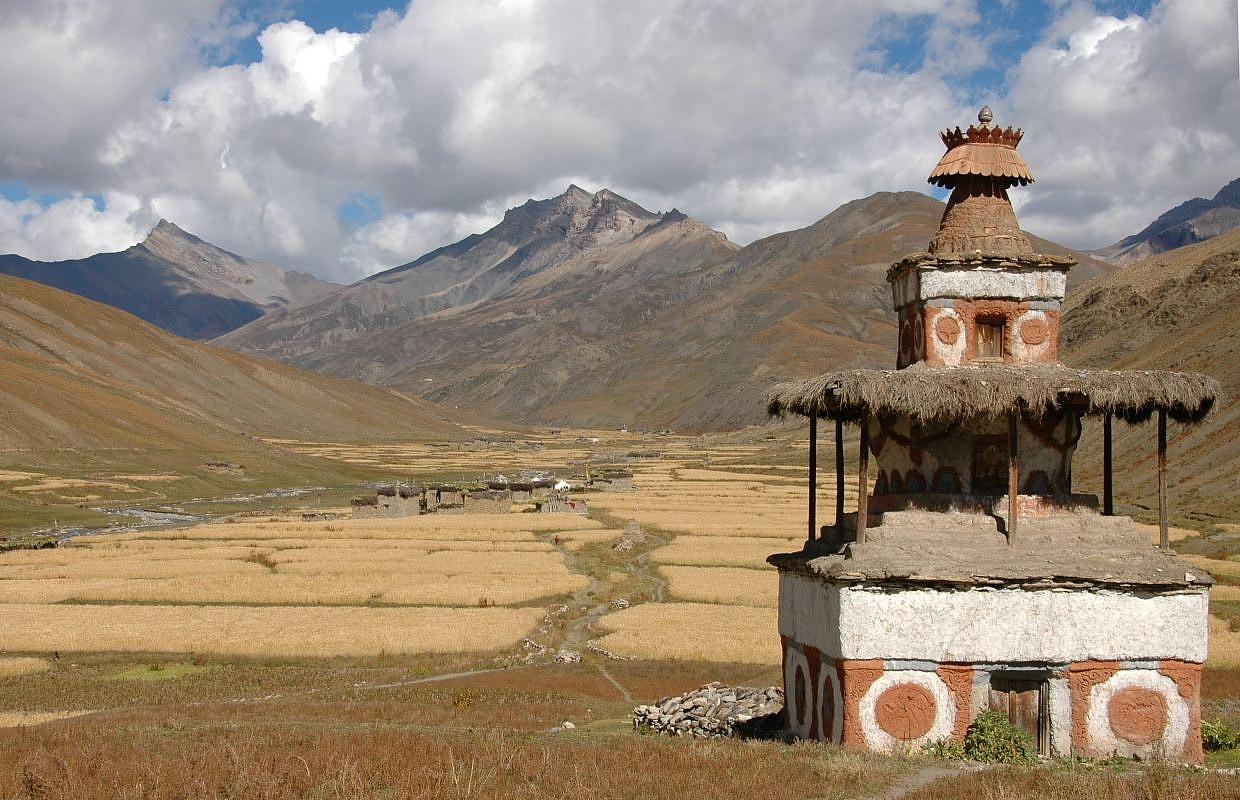
Highland barley field in Tibet

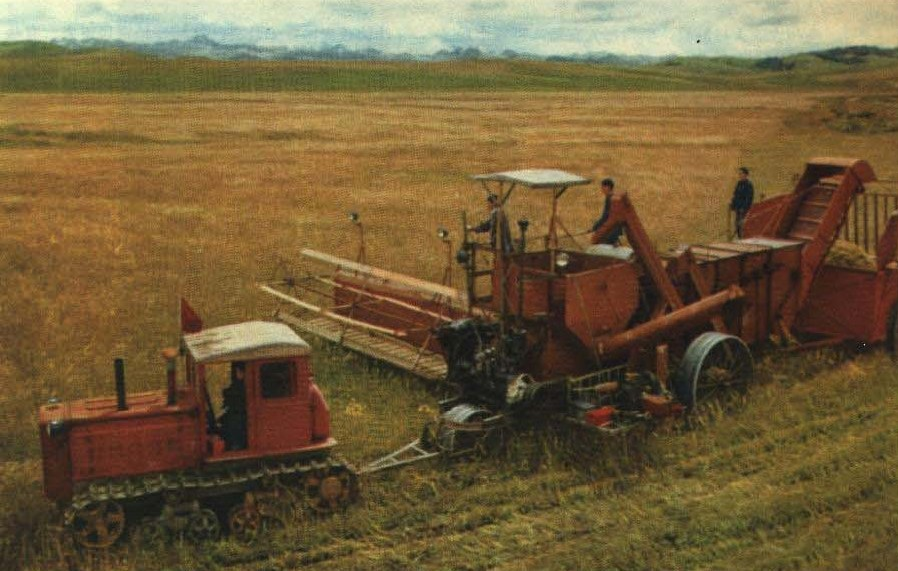
Barley harvest in Barkam, Aba Prefecture, Sichuan Province, in 1963.

Highland barley, Tibetan barley or Himalayan barley (Tibetan: ནས་; Wylie: nas; Chinese: 青稞; qīngkē, or 藏青稞; zàng qīngkē) is the principal cereal cultivated on the Tibetan Plateau, used mainly to make tsampa and liquor (chang).

Today, it is used to make beer (Lhasa Beer), flour, bread, cakes or noodles.

Three Chinese words are associated with two varieties of barley:

- 青稞 and 藏青稞: Hordeum aegiceras Nees ex Royle
- 青稞: Hordeum distichon L.

== Gallery ==
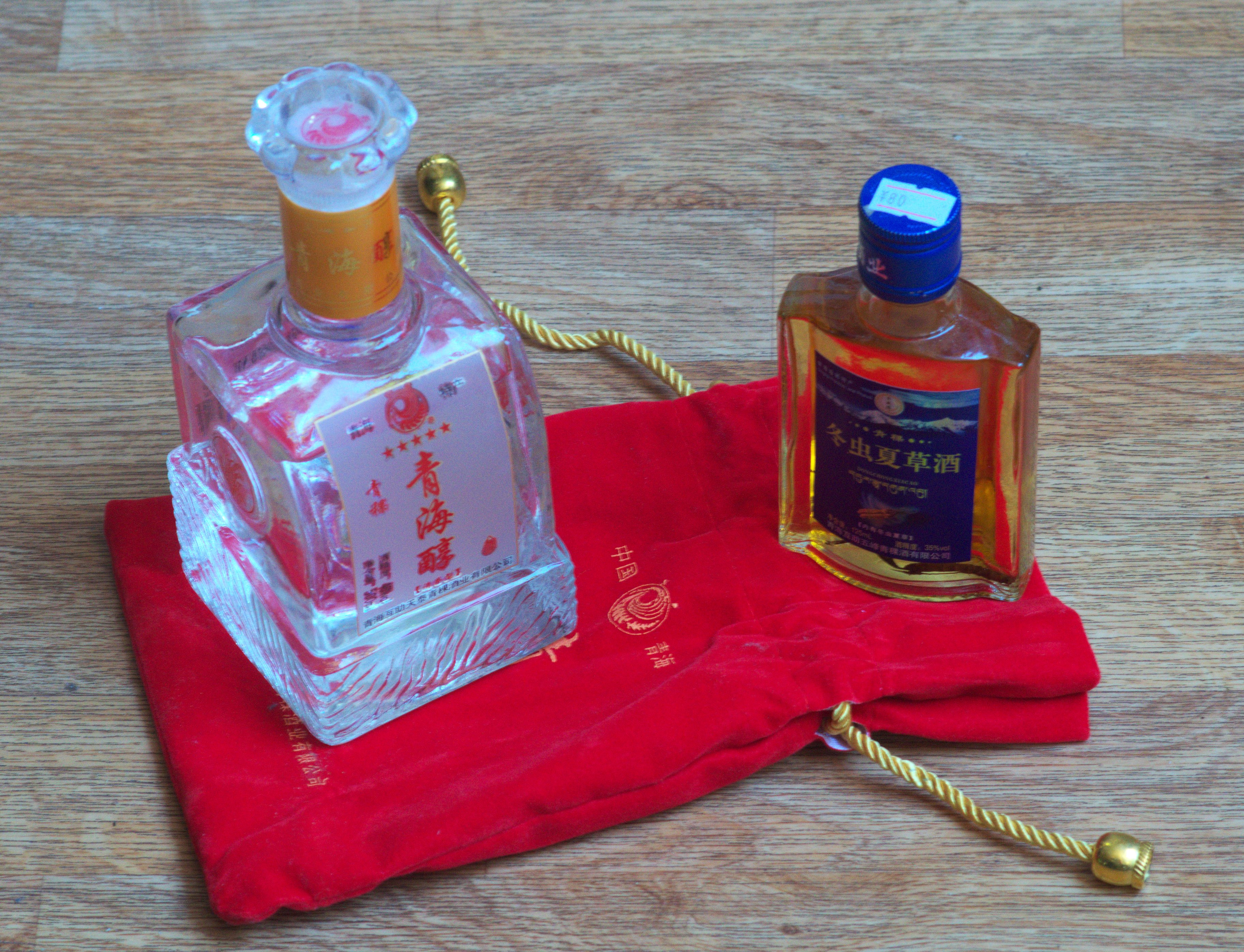
Two highland barley alcohols (青稞酒)

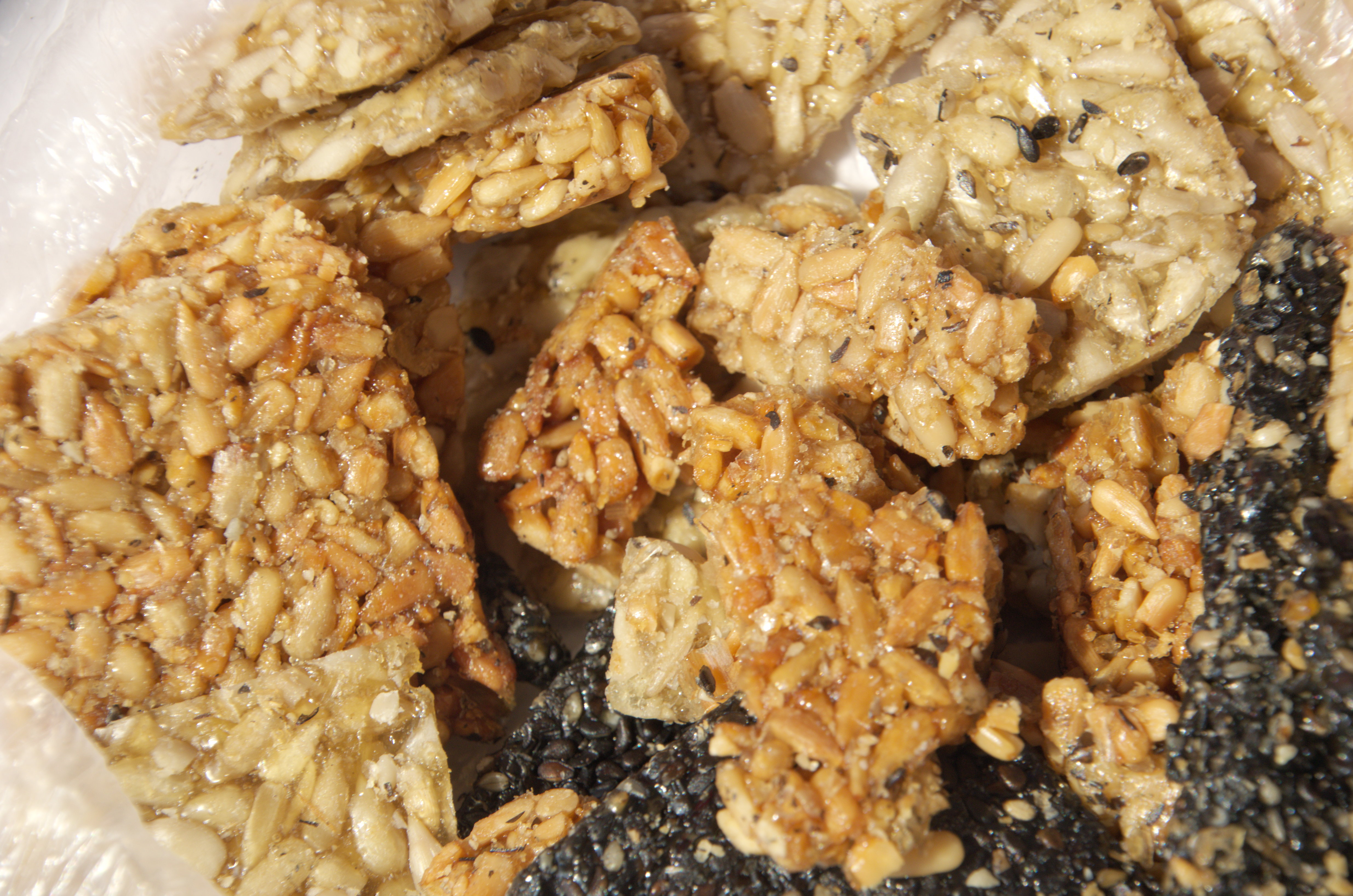
Highland barley, honey, and some other cereals biscuits (青稞蜂蜜酥)

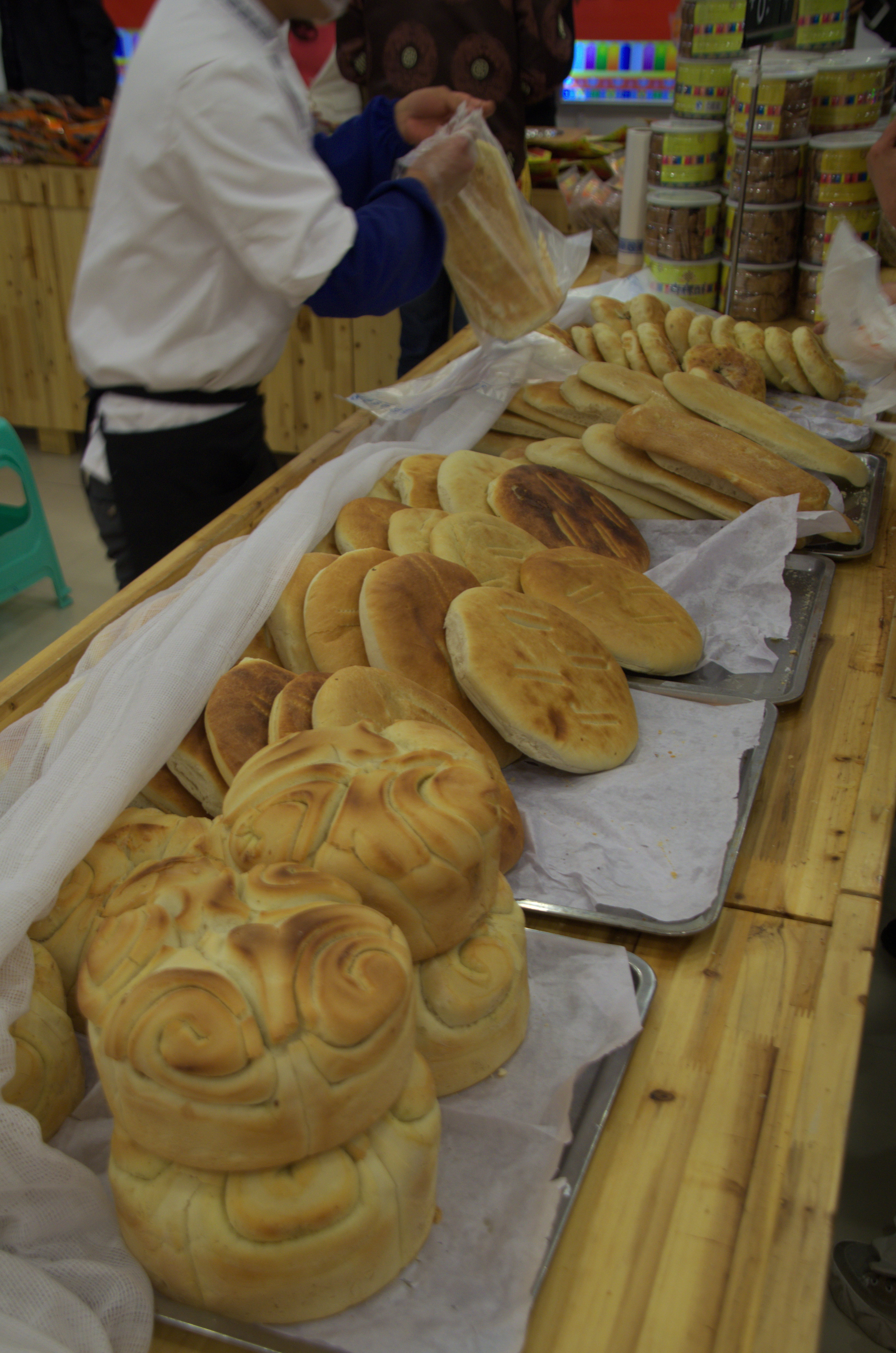
Various bread made from highland barley flour

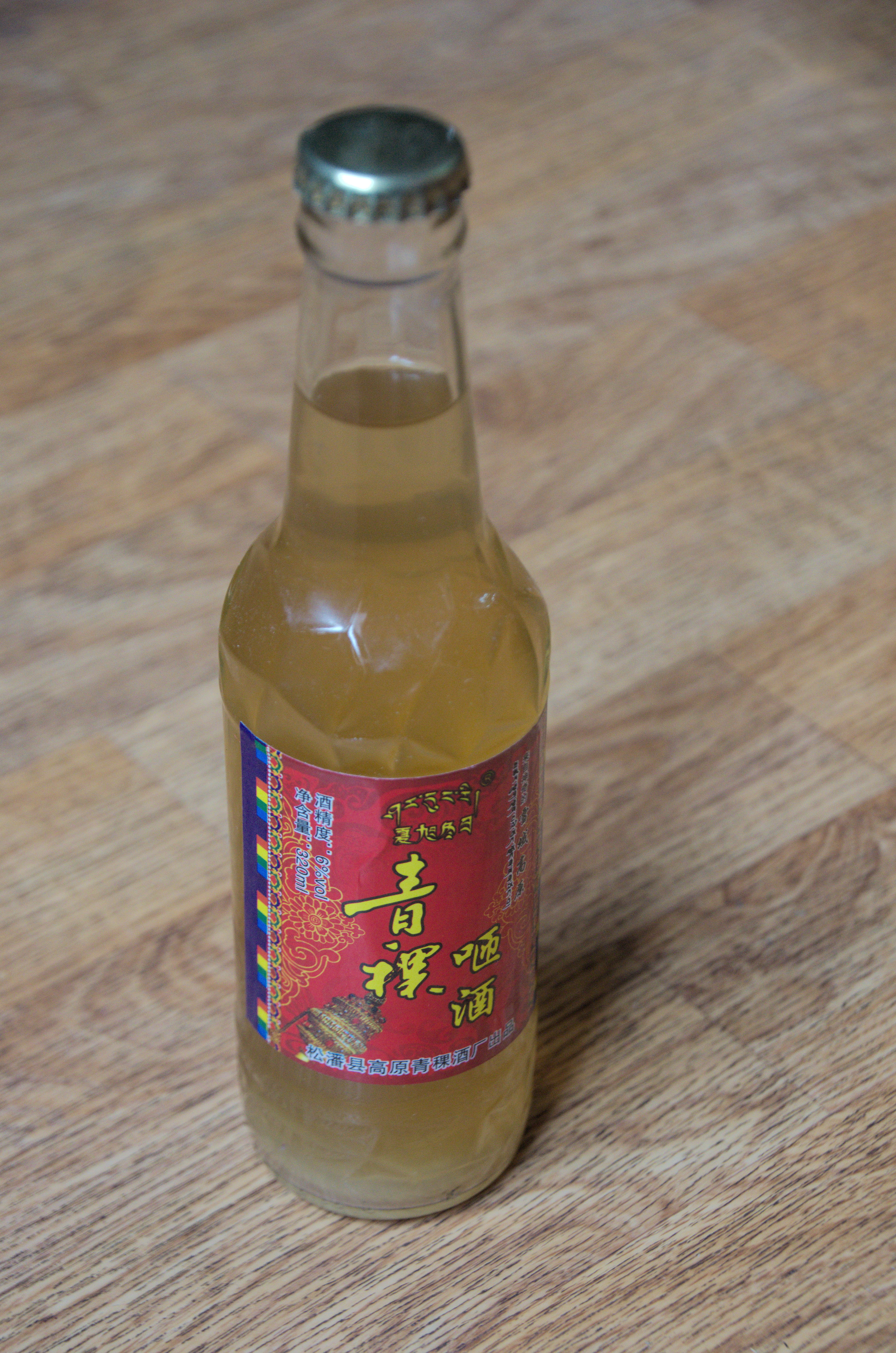
beer from highland barley flour (青稞咂酒)

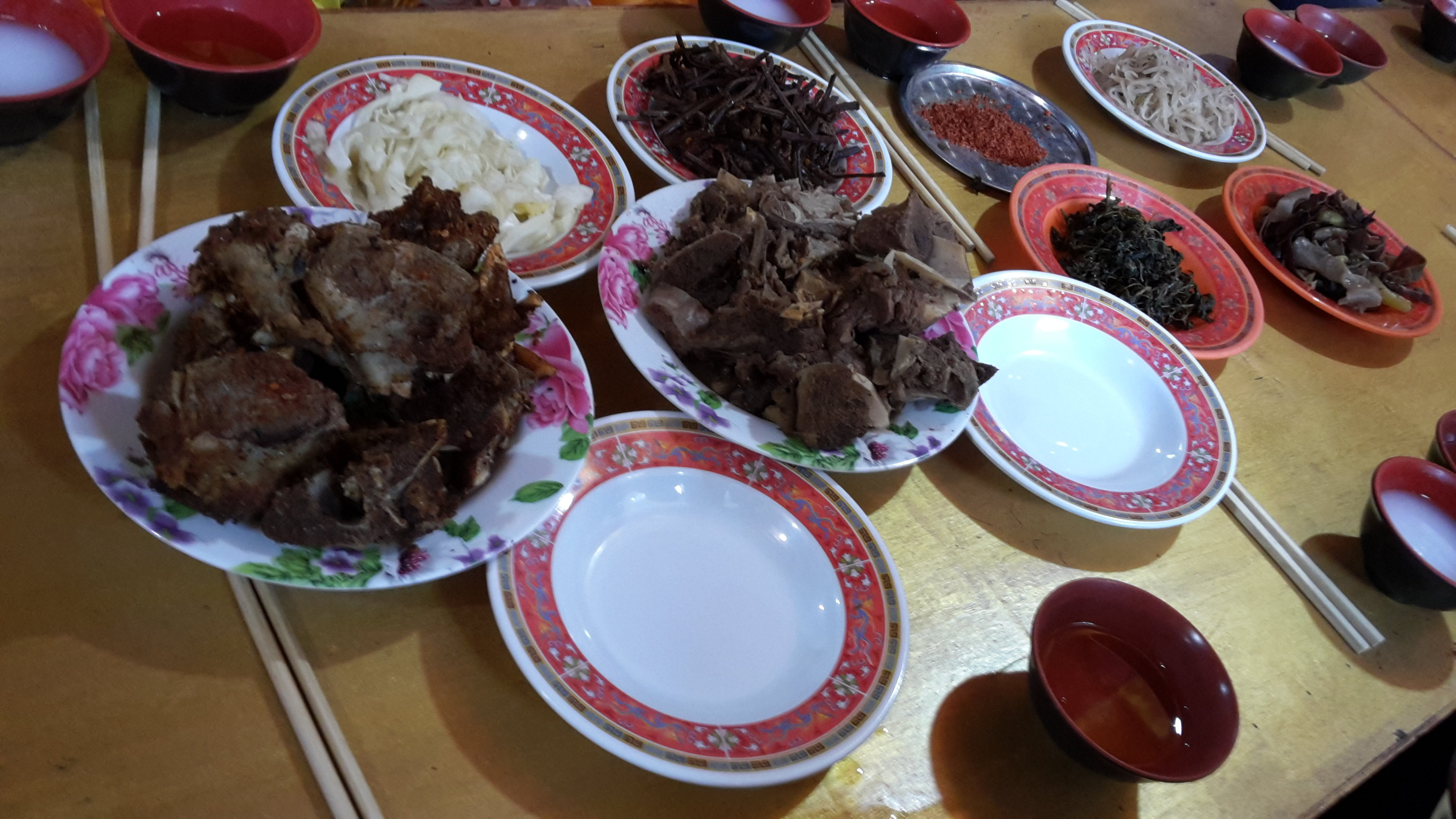
highland barley noodle among other Jiuzhaigou County meals.
