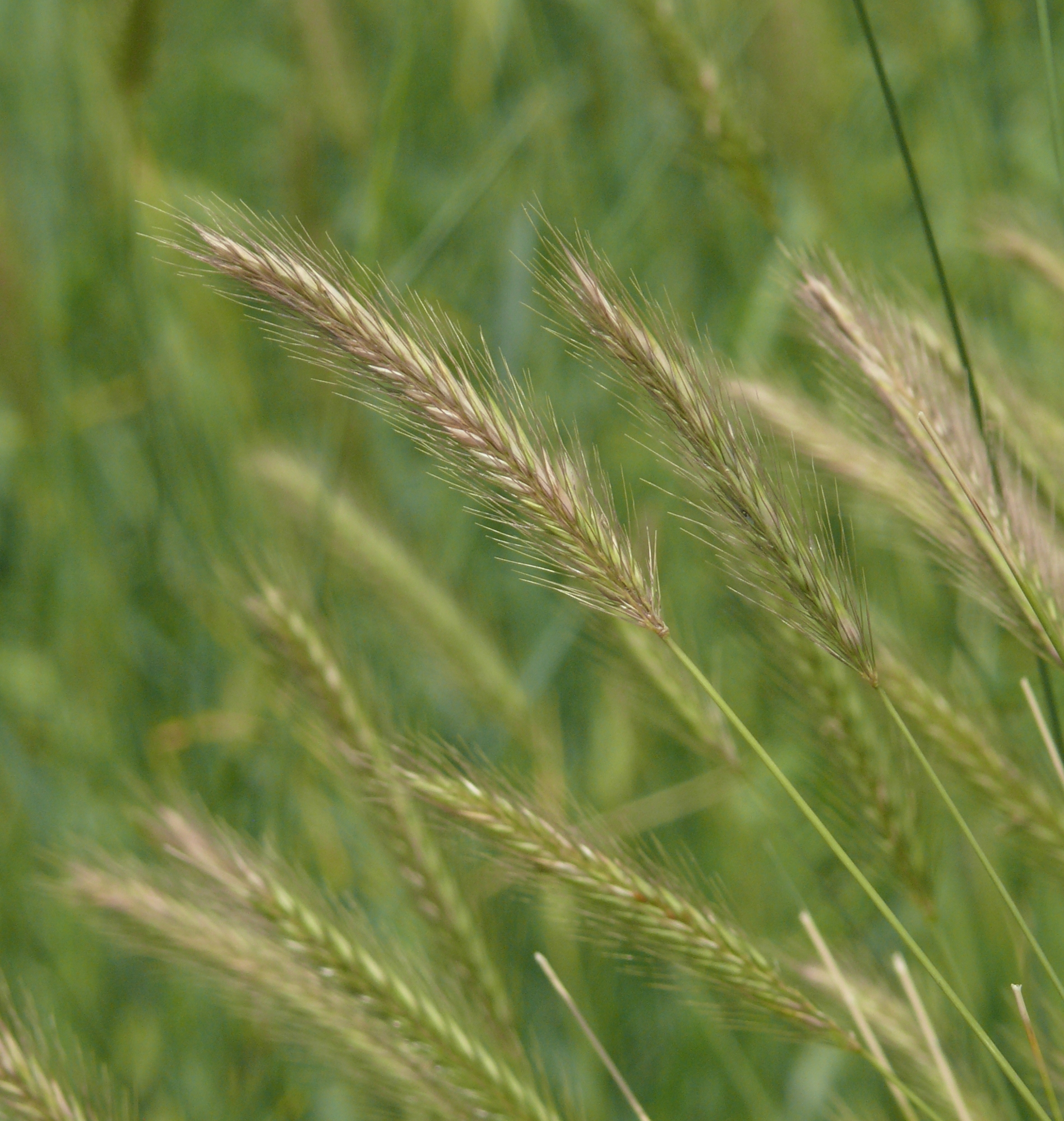

Conservation status
- Least Concern (IUCN 3.1)

Scientific classification
- Kingdom: Plantae
- Clade: Tracheophytes
- Clade: Angiosperms
- Clade: Monocots
- Clade: Commelinids
- Order: Poales
- Family: Poaceae
- Subfamily: Pooideae
- Tribe: Triticeae
- Genus: Hordeum
- Species: H. secalinum

Binomial name
- Hordeum secalinum Schreb.

Synonyms
- List: Critesion secalinum (Schreb.) Á.Löve; Frumentum pratense E.H.L.Krause; Hordeum maritimum Roth; Hordeum maritimum O.F.Müll.; Hordeum maximum Vill.; Hordeum pratense Huds.; Hordeum rothii Link; Hordeum sibiricum Link ex Steud.; Zeocriton maritimum P.Beauv.; Zeocriton secalinum (Schreb.) P.Beauv.

= Hordeum secalinum =

Species of flowering plant

Hordeum secalinum, false rye barley or meadow barley (a name it shares with Hordeum brachyantherum), is a species of wild barley native to Europe, including the Madeiras, Crimea and the north Caucasus, northwest Africa, and the Levant. It has been introduced to Australia and New Zealand. An allotetraploid, it arose from ancestors with the Xa and I Hordeum genomes.
