= Hordeum cordobense =

Scientific classification
- Kingdom: Plantae
- Clade: Tracheophytes
- Clade: Angiosperms
- Clade: Monocots
- Clade: Commelinids
- Order: Poales
- Family: Poaceae
- Subfamily: Pooideae
- Genus: Hordeum
- Species: H. cordobense

Binomial name
- Hordeum cordobense Bothmer, N.Jacobsen & Nicora

Synonyms
- Critesion cordobense (Bothmer, N.Jacobsen & Nicora) Á.Löve; Hordeum compressum f. tenuispicatum Hack.; Hordeum muticum subvar. tenuispicatum (Hack.) Thell.

Species of plant

Hordeum cordobense is a species of wild barley in the grass family Poaceae, native to northern Argentina. A diploid found below 1,000 m (3,300 ft), its closest relative is Hordeum muticum, a highland species with a more northerly distribution.
