= Ana María Ragonese =

Argentine botanist

Ana M. Ragonese
- Born: Ana María Ragonese; 2 July 1928; Buenos Aires, Argentina
- Died: 19 July 1999 (aged 71)
- Education: University of Buenos Aires
- Scientific career
- Fields: Paleobotany, botany
- Workplaces: University of Buenos Aires
- Author abbrev. (botany): A.M.Ragonese

Ana María Ragonese (2 July 1928 – 19 July 1999) was an Argentine botanist and paleobotanist. She researched plant anatomy, focusing on dicotyledons and the anatomy of the fruit and foliage of Frankeniaceae. Ragonese taught at the University of Buenos Aires and was a researcher for the National Scientific and Technical Research Council (CONICET). Later in her career, she conducted paleobotanical research at the Bernardino Rivadavia Natural Sciences Argentine Museum and worked at the Darwinian Institute of Botany.

== Early life and education ==
Ana María Ragonese was born on 2 July 1928 in Buenos Aires. She attended the University of Buenos Aires, earning a doctorate in natural sciences at the Faculty of Exact and Natural Sciences in 1960.

== Botany career ==
Ragonese taught plant anatomy at the University of Buenos Aires in the Faculty of Exact and Natural Sciences. She was an assistant to the chief of practical work and she became an adjunct professor, a position she held until 1974.

In 1962, Ragonese became a researcher for the National Scientific and Technical Research Council (CONICET) and the Faculty of Agronomy at the University of Buenos Aires. Ragonese was awarded a CONICET scholarship in 1971 and conducted research at the Jodrell Laboratory of the Royal Botanic Gardens, Kew in London. In 1974, Ragonese was the technical secretary of the Miguel Lillo Institute of the National University of Tucumán and a researcher at the Institute of Agricultural Botany.

Ragonese's research focused on dicotyledons and the anatomy of the fruit and foliage of Frankeniaceae. She also studied the genera Pterocaulon, Dimorphandra, Adesmia, Rhynchospora, and Mora. She studied fossil wood morphology and the wood anatomy of Asteraceae, Myrtaceae, and Araliaceae. She was also involved in taxonomic revision, publishing numerous articles in her fields. She collected fossils of terrestrial plants and spermatophytes from 1967 to 1981 alongside Elisa G. Nicora and Encarnación Rosa Guaglianone.

Ragonese conducted research in the paleobotany division of the Bernardino Rivadavia Natural Sciences Argentine Museum in Buenos Aires. She later worked at the Darwinian Institute of Botany until she retired in 1990. She was a member of the International Association of Wood Anatomists and the Argentine Society of Botany.

Ragonese died on 19 July 1999.

== Selected publications ==
- Ragonese, Ana María (1977). "Nothofagoxylon menendezii, leño petrificado del terciario de General Roca, Río Negro, Argentina". Ameghiniana. 14 (1–4): 59–74.
- Cabrera, Ángel L.; Ragonese, Ana María (1978). "Revisión del género Pterocaulon (Compositae)". Darwiniana. 21 (2/4): 185–257. ISSN 0011-6793. JSTOR 23215593.
- Ragonese, Ana María (July 1980). "Las Placas de Perforacion en los Vasos de Pterocaulon (Compositae)" (PDF). Boletín de la Sociedad Argentina de Botánica. XIX (1–2): 139–147.
- Ragonese, Ana María (1988). "Eupatorium inulaefoliurn H. BK (Compositae)" (PDF). Acta Farmacéutica Bonaerense. 7 (3): 161–168.
- Ragonese, Ana María (1990). "Caracteres Xeromorfos Foliares de Nassauvia Lagascae (Compositae)". Darwiniana. 30 (1/4): 1–10. ISSN 0011-6793. JSTOR 23222514.
