= Pearl Abu =

Ghanaian researcher

Pearl Abu is a Ghanaian researcher focusing on plant breeding and genetics.

== Education and career ==
She obtained her doctorate in agricultural sciences in 2019. She then became a postdoctoral researcher at the West Africa Centre for Crop Improvement (WACCI). She is a plant breeder and geneticist. Her research focuses on maize, which is a staple crop for millions of households in Sub-Saharan Africa. Maize productivity in the region is threatened by pressures from climate change, soil degradation, which Abu aims to combat. She leads a team breeding maize strains with improved yields, stress tolerance, and nutrition, while also studying symbiotic interactions between maize and arbuscular mycorrhizal fungi.

She is a senior lecturer at the University of Ghana and team lead for maize at WACCI. She became a member of the Organization for Women in Science for the Developing World (OWSD) in 2024. She helped establish the first Ghanaian breeding facility for double haploid maize at WACCI, allowing breeders to develop homozygous lines in two generations compared to six to eight using traditional breeding methods.

=== Recognition ===
Abu received the UNESCO–Equatorial Guinea Fellowship Programme for Young African Women Scientists in a ceremony held on 25 November 2025 in Malabo, Equatorial Guinea. She was recognised for her research in developing maize varieties enriched in protein and provitamin A specifically adapted to nitrogen-poor soils.
