= Hordeum capense =

Scientific classification
- Kingdom: Plantae
- Clade: Embryophytes
- Clade: Tracheophytes
- Clade: Spermatophytes
- Clade: Angiosperms
- Clade: Monocots
- Clade: Commelinids
- Order: Poales
- Family: Poaceae
- Subfamily: Pooideae
- Tribe: Triticeae
- Genus: Hordeum
- Species: H. capense

Binomial name
- Hordeum capense Thunb.

Synonyms
- Critesion capense (Thunb.) Á.Löve

Species of plant

Hordeum capense is a species of wild barley native to South Africa and Lesotho. An allotetraploid, it arose from ancestors with the Xa and I Hordeum genomes.
