= Hordeum chilense =

Scientific classification
- Kingdom: Plantae
- Clade: Embryophytes
- Clade: Tracheophytes
- Clade: Spermatophytes
- Clade: Angiosperms
- Clade: Monocots
- Clade: Commelinids
- Order: Poales
- Family: Poaceae
- Subfamily: Pooideae
- Tribe: Triticeae
- Genus: Hordeum
- Species: H. chilense

Binomial name
- Hordeum chilense Roem. & Schult.

Synonyms
- List: Critesion chilense (Roem. & Schult.) Á.Löve; Hordeum chilense var. pseudosecalinum Hauman; Hordeum cylindricum Steud.; Hordeum depauperatum Steud.; Hordeum pratense var. brongniartii Macloskie; Hordeum secalinum var. chilense É.Desv.

Species of plant

Hordeum chilense is a species of wild barley native to Chile and Argentina. A diploid, it is used or being explored for use in barley crop improvement due to its resistance to Zymoseptoria tritici septoria leaf blotch, its high seed yellow pigment content (YPC), and its cytoplasmic male sterility. It is a parent, along with durum wheat, of the hybrid crop Tritordeum.
