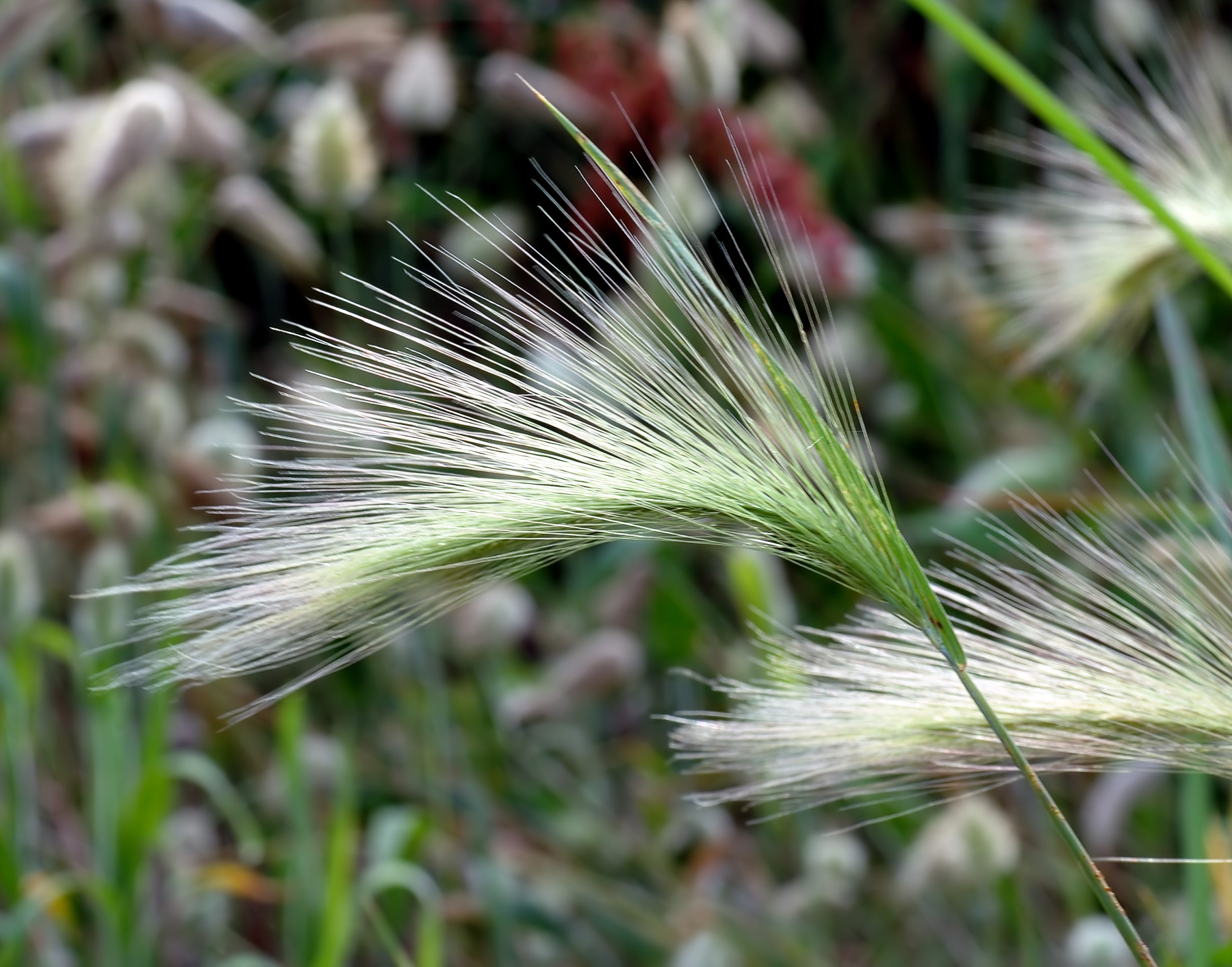

Conservation status
- Least Concern (IUCN 3.1)

- Secure (NatureServe)

Scientific classification
- Kingdom: Plantae
- Clade: Tracheophytes
- Clade: Angiosperms
- Clade: Monocots
- Clade: Commelinids
- Order: Poales
- Family: Poaceae
- Subfamily: Pooideae
- Genus: Hordeum
- Species: H. jubatum

Binomial name
- Hordeum jubatum L.

Synonyms
- Critesion adscendens (Kunth) Á.Löve; Critesion geniculatum Raf.; Critesion jubatum (L.) Nevski; Elymus jubatus Link; Hordeum adscendens Kunth; Hordeum caespitosum Scribn. ex Pammel; Hordeum pampeanum (Hauman) Herter

= Hordeum jubatum =

Foxtail barley

Species of flowering plant

Hordeum jubatum, with common names foxtail barley, bobtail barley, squirreltail barley, and intermediate barley, is a perennial plant species in the grass family Poaceae. It occurs wild mainly in northern North America and adjacent northeastern Siberia. However, as it escaped often from gardens it can be found worldwide in areas with temperate to warm climates, and is considered a weed in many countries. The species is a polyploid and originated via hybridization of an East Asian Hordeum species with a close but extinct relative of Californian H. brachyantherum. It is grown as an ornamental plant for its attractive inflorescences and when done flowering for its inflorescence.

== Properties ==
Foxtail barley (Hordeum jubatum) propagates by seed. It is known for its ability to tolerate saline soils but is capable of productive growth on soil types ranging from loamy to clayey soils with pH's of 6.4 to 9.5. The upper limit of soil NaCl for productive growth and development is 1.0%. Foxtail barley is also adapted to a wide range of moisture regimes from dry to wet. Although this species is generally found on moist sites, it can withstand drought-like conditions. It is commonly found in lowland areas with restricted soil drainage, disturbed sites, waste areas and fields. Foxtail barley is a pioneer species or invader in disturbed areas and in areas with high salinity. It is among the first grasses to establish after disturbance and rapidly invades areas exposed by a receding water table.

== Seedling ==
Foxtail barley is a prolific seed producer, with each plant capable of producing upwards of 200 seeds. Seeds are elliptical, yellowish-brown and about a 0.25 inches (0.64 cm) long with four to eight awns (the long bristles). The seeds also have sharp, backwards-pointing barbs that can catch on surfaces such as skin, clothing, or hair that come into contact with them. Seed is dispersed by wind, machinery and animals, and germinates in the cooler temperatures of the spring or fall. Seed that germinates in the fall can overwinter and then resume growing in early spring, giving foxtail barley a competitive advantage over many crops. Germination is inhibited by warm temperatures, and the seeds require a period of darkness for germination to occur. Foxtail barley is a shallow-rooted plant with germination occurring at soil depths not greater than 3 inches (7.6 cm). The seedling of foxtail barley first appears as thin, vertical leaves covered in short, dense hairs. The leaves have prominent venation and rough margins, while auricles are absent or elemental and the membranous ligule is very short with fine hairs.

== Juvenile/mature ==
Foxtail barley is a fibrous-rooted, densely tufted grass that grows from 30–100 centimetres (12–39 in) tall and is erect or reclining at the base. The stems are erect and smooth and the leaf sheaths are split and hairy. The inflorescence of the mature plant is a dense, long-awned nodding spike with greenish or purplish colouring. The jointed rachis divides into sharply pointed segments with three spikelets composing each segment. Only the central spikelet has one creamy coloured seed while each segment has seven awns with upward pointing barbs. These awns are up to 3 inches (7.6 cm) long and become easily attached to animals, clothing, machinery, etc. Leaf blades are slender and a greyish-green colour.

== Ecological impact ==
Foxtail barley is distinguished from cultivated barley (H. vulgare L.) and Meadow barley (H. brachyantherum) by length of awns in the lemma. H. brachyantherum has awn lengths of 0.5 inches (1.3 cm); Foxtail barley has lengths of 0.5–3 inches (1.3–7.6 cm); and cultivated barley of 10–15 centimetres (3.9–5.9 in) in length. Once foxtail barley is established, it becomes extremely difficult to eradicate. Its extensive root systems and aggressive habit, as well as its ability to tolerate saline soils make it a resilient competitor. It is considered a weed because of this competitive ability and the dangers it poses to livestock. While foxtail barley may be palatable for animals in early spring before it flowers, its seed heads, when dry, are very harmful to grazing animals. The awns can harm animals, as their upward-pointing barbs become easily attached and embedded in the animal's mouth and face; once embedded they can cause severe irritation, abscesses, and even blindness. In horses they can cause painful ulcers and excessive salivation resulting in eating difficulties. It is a weed in wheat cultivation.

=== Diseases ===
Foxtail barley is also host to a number of viruses, and because it harbours wheat rust and blackstem rust, can indirectly affect the development of field crops. Holtz et al., 2013 find H. jubatum is also host to Puccinia striiformis f. sp. tritici (Pst) and Puccinia striiformis f. sp. hordei (Psh).

Since foxtail barley accumulates high amounts of salt in its leaves and roots, it has the potential of reducing soil salinity. Given foxtail barley's ability to withstand saline soils, it has been identified as having potential for the revegetation of saline mine spoils to reduce erosion. It has also been recommended as a species suitable for wildlife habitat rehabilitation on disturbed lands, but given its other less desirable traits, other natural grass species would be more beneficial.

== Ethnobotanical uses ==
Foxtail barley has been recorded as having varied uses among Native North American societies. The Chippewa and Potawatomi used the root as medicine; the Kawaiisu pounded and ate the seeds dry, or used the plant as a tool to rub the skin off yucca stalks. Jacques Rousseau noted Iroquois children placing the dried seed heads in the sleeves of others as a prank. The Ramah Navajo considered the plant poisonous and avoided it.
