= Hordeum lechleri =

Conservation status
- Least Concern (IUCN 3.1)

Scientific classification
- Kingdom: Plantae
- Clade: Tracheophytes
- Clade: Angiosperms
- Clade: Monocots
- Clade: Commelinids
- Order: Poales
- Family: Poaceae
- Subfamily: Pooideae
- Genus: Hordeum
- Species: H. lechleri

Binomial name
- Hordeum lechleri (Steud.) Schenck

Species of grass

Hordeum lechleri is a species of grass of the order Poales. The plant is found in southern Chile and Argentina, and in the Falkland Islands. It is very prevalent in these areas, and can subsist in both fresh and salt water environments. It tends to grow in river valleys and meadows. The plant's genetics have led it to be considered as a gene donor for future crop improvement.
