= Hordeum erectifolium =

Scientific classification
- Kingdom: Plantae
- Clade: Tracheophytes
- Clade: Angiosperms
- Clade: Monocots
- Clade: Commelinids
- Order: Poales
- Family: Poaceae
- Subfamily: Pooideae
- Genus: Hordeum
- Species: H. erectifolium

Binomial name
- Hordeum erectifolium Bothmer, N.Jacobsen & R.B.Jørg.

South American plant species

Hordeum erectifolium is a species of herbaceous plant in the family Poaceae. It is native to Northeastern Argentina.

== Habitat ==
Hordeum erectifolium is found in low-altitude, halophytic vegetation near saline lakes.

== Classification ==
Hordeum erectifolium is classified within the genus Hordeum in the family Poaceae.
