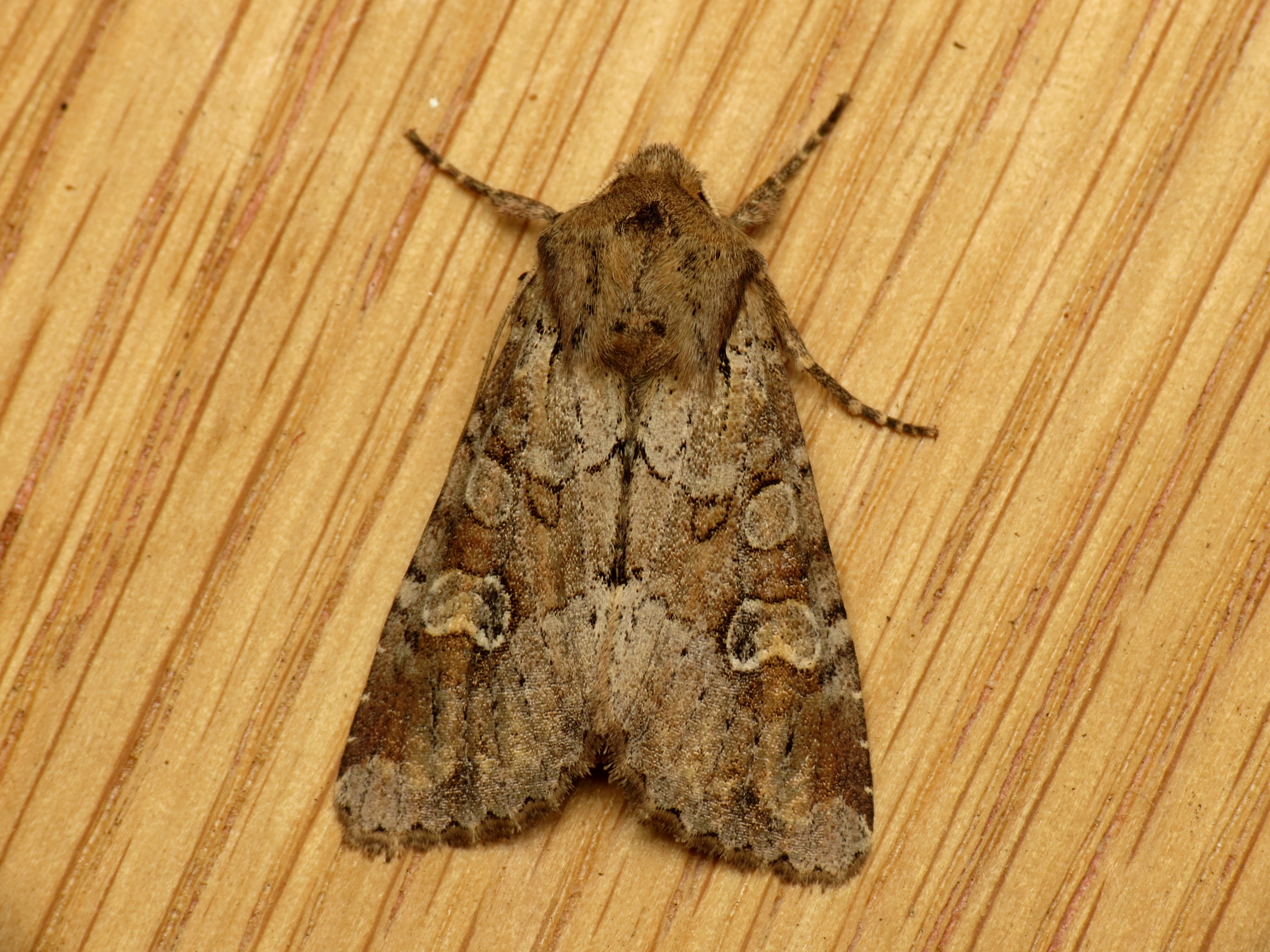

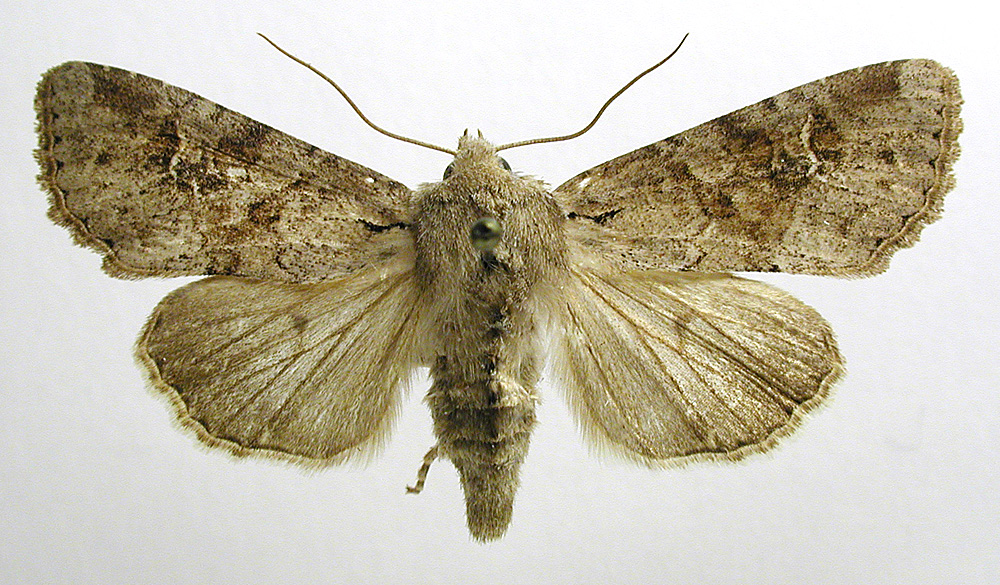

Scientific classification
- Kingdom: Animalia
- Phylum: Arthropoda
- Class: Insecta
- Order: Lepidoptera
- Superfamily: Noctuoidea
- Family: Noctuidae
- Genus: Apamea
- Species: A. sordens

Binomial name
- Apamea sordens (Hufnagel, 1766)

Synonyms
- Apamea basilinea; Apamea finitima; Hadena cinefacta; Noctua basilinea; Noctua nebulosa; Phalaena sordens

= Apamea sordens =

Rustic shoulder-knot

Species of moth

Apamea sordens, the rustic shoulder-knot or bordered apamea, is a moth of the family Noctuidae. The species was first described by Johann Siegfried Hufnagel in 1766. It is distributed throughout Europe, east across the Palearctic to Central Asia and to China and Japan. It also occurs in North America (Labrador to Virginia, west across Canada, south to Minnesota).

This moth has a wingspan of 36 to 42 mm. The forewings are brown with mostly indistinct markings except for the narrow black mark at the base of the wing which gives the species its common name. The hindwings are greyish brown, darker towards the margins, with prominent dark venation. This moth flies at night and is attracted to light and sugar.

== Technical description and variation ==
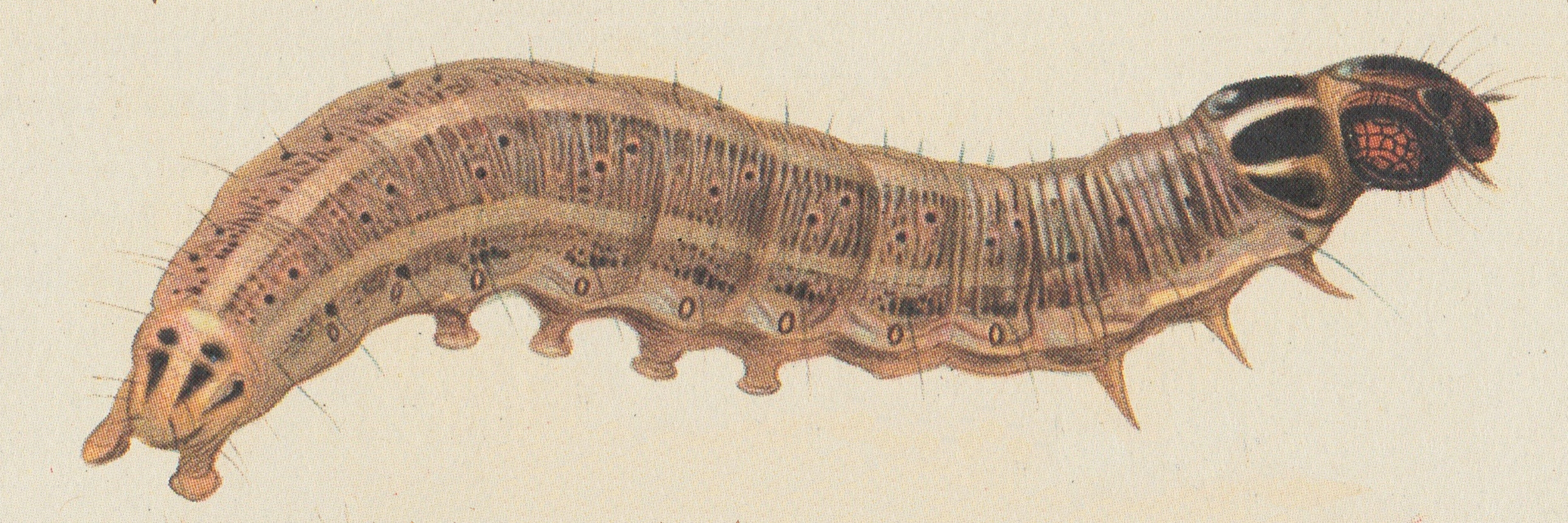
Caterpillar

Forewing dull lilac grey, flushed with fawn colour, especially in median area; a black, semibifid streak from base below cell; lines brownish, double, indistinct; the median shade dark grey or fawn colour, diffuse and prominent; orbicular stigma pale, black-edged; reniform large with grey centre, blackish in lower lobe, with pale annulus and black outline; claviform small, with dark outline; submarginal line dull, with darker shades in places on each side; hindwing greyish fuscous, paler towards base; — in basistriga Stgr. the ground colour is bluish grey except the median area, and the black basal streak is stronger; this form is recorded from western Turkestan, eastern Siberia, Japan, and China, also from Norway; a small series from Pescocostanzo, Italy, seems referable here; — ab. grisescens Stgr. from Tibet and Turkestan is altogether paler and greyer; — ab. unicolor Tutt is a melanistic form from the north of England, in which the ground is dark reddish brown with a purplish tinge, the stigmata and lines more or less obscured; hindwing much darker; — pallida Tutt and cinerascens Tutt are both grey forms without any rufous admixture, the former being pale ochreous grey, and the latter dull ashy grey, the one from Ireland, the other from northern England; this latter form probably occurs, however, in other localities, and is distinct from Staudinger's Central Asiatic form grisescens, for which Spuler quotes Finland and Esthland with a ? as localities. .

Its flight season in the British Isles is May and June.

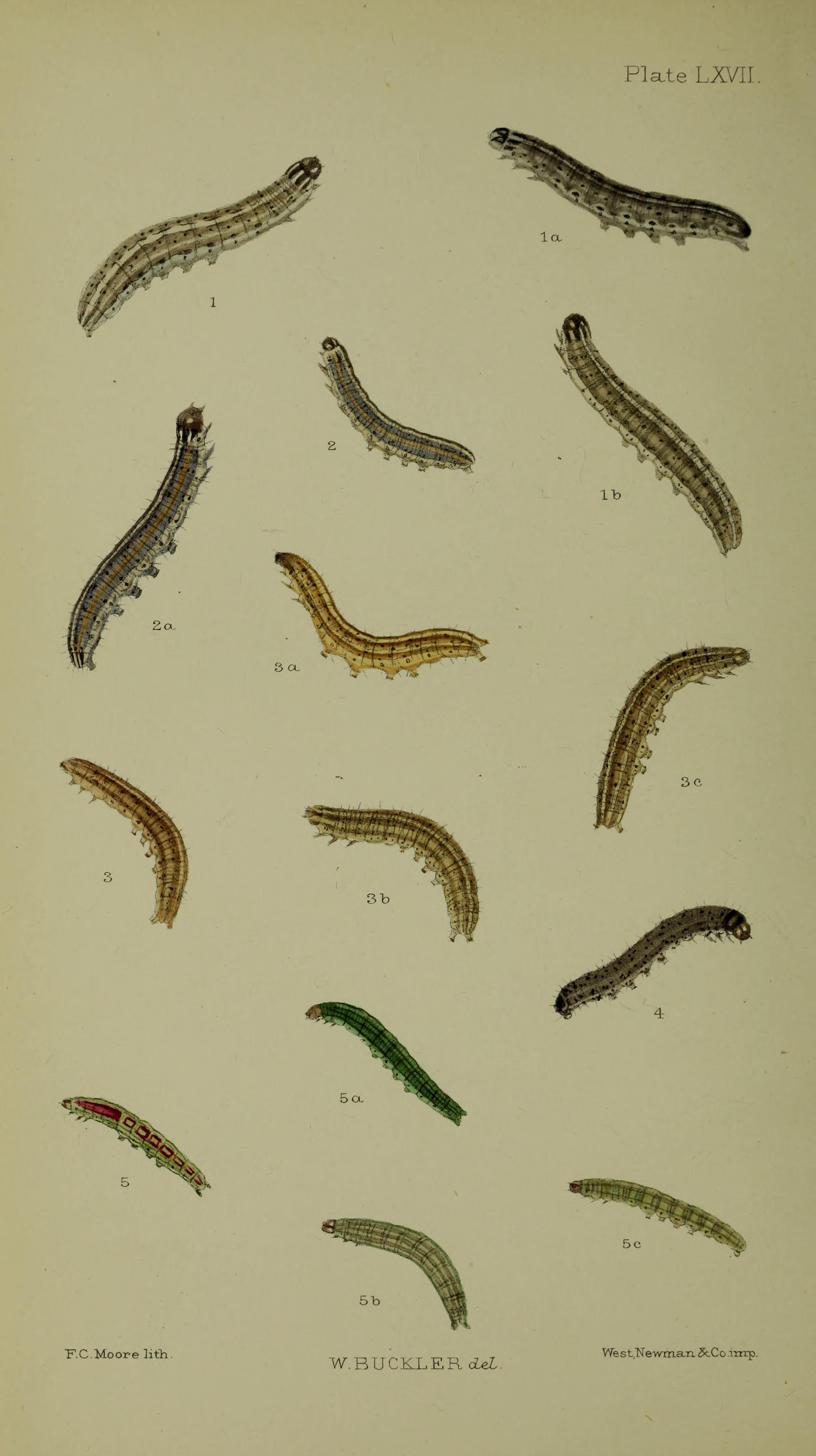
Figs 1, 1a, 1b larva after last moult

The larva feeds on various grasses, including oats, fescues, barleys, canarygrasses, timothy, ryes, wheats, and wild rice. This species overwinters as a larva, feeding in mild weather throughout the season. it is grey brown with black tubercles; dorsal line broad, whitish; subdorsal finer; spiracular line broadly whitish, edged above with dark; feeding when quite young in autumn in the grains of corn and after hibernation in the fresh lower leaves and on grasses.

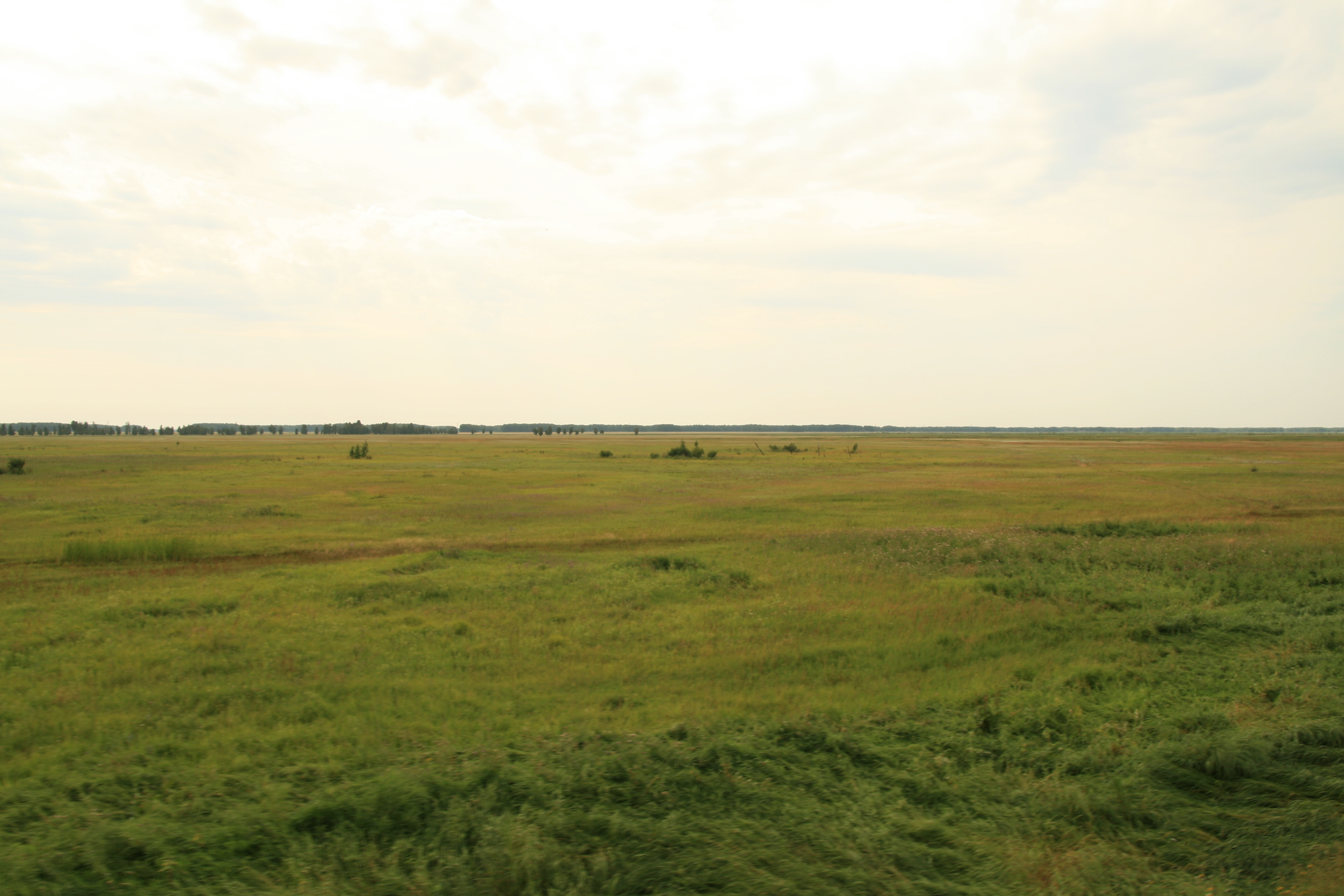
Habitat in Siberia

Its habitat includes fields, grasslands, and steppe.

== Subspecies ==
- Apamea sordens finitima (formerly A. finitima)
- Apamea sordens cerivana (Alberta)
- Apamea sordens sableana Mikkola, 2009
