= Hordeum comosum =

Scientific classification
- Kingdom: Plantae
- Clade: Embryophytes
- Clade: Tracheophytes
- Clade: Spermatophytes
- Clade: Angiosperms
- Clade: Monocots
- Clade: Commelinids
- Order: Poales
- Family: Poaceae
- Subfamily: Pooideae
- Genus: Hordeum
- Species: H. comosum

Binomial name
- Hordeum comosum J.Presl

Synonyms
- List: Critesion comosum (J.Presl) Á.Löve; Hordeum andinum Trin.; Hordeum comosum var. bifidum Parodi ex Nicora; Hordeum comosum var. flavescens É.Desv.; Hordeum comosum var. humile É.Desv.; Hordeum comosum var. rigidum É.Desv.; Hordeum divergens Nees & Meyen ex Steud.; Hordeum jubatum var. comosum (J.Presl) Kuntze; Hordeum jubatum f. flavidum Kuntze; Hordeum jubatum f. versicolor Kuntze

Species of plant

Hordeum comosum is a species of wild barley in the family Poaceae. It is native to Chile and western and southern Argentina, and has been introduced to the Falkland Islands. A widespread perennial grass, it is an important forage as it is relished by sheep.
