= Hordeum pubiflorum =

Scientific classification
- Kingdom: Plantae
- Clade: Tracheophytes
- Clade: Angiosperms
- Clade: Monocots
- Clade: Commelinids
- Order: Poales
- Family: Poaceae
- Subfamily: Pooideae
- Genus: Hordeum
- Species: H. pubiflorum

Binomial name
- Hordeum pubiflorum Hook.f.

Species of grass

Hordeum pubiflorum, also known as Antarctic barley, is a perennial that is native to western and southern South America.

== Genetics ==
Together with Hordeum vulgare, Hordeum pubiflorum is the only species from the genus Hordeum with a genome published on NCBI.
