= Hordeum californicum =

Conservation status
- Apparently Secure (NatureServe)

Scientific classification
- Kingdom: Plantae
- Clade: Embryophytes
- Clade: Tracheophytes
- Clade: Spermatophytes
- Clade: Angiosperms
- Clade: Monocots
- Clade: Commelinids
- Order: Poales
- Family: Poaceae
- Subfamily: Pooideae
- Genus: Hordeum
- Species: H. californicum

Binomial name
- Hordeum californicum Covas & Stebbins

Synonyms
- Critesion californicum (Covas & Stebbins) Á.Löve; Critesion californicum subsp. californicum; Hordeum brachyantherum subsp. californicum (Covas & Stebbins) Bothmer, N.Jacobsen & Seberg

Species of grass

Hordeum californicum is a species of flowering plant in the family Poaceae, native to the U.S. states of California, Nevada and Oregon.

== Habitat and characteristics ==
Hordeum californicum lives in areas with low water and partial shade. It is a deciduous grass that grows upright, is coloured yellow, has a slow growth rate and grows 2-3 feet tall. It flowers in spring.
