= Hordeum muticum =

Conservation status
- Least Concern (IUCN 3.1)

Scientific classification
- Kingdom: Plantae
- Clade: Tracheophytes
- Clade: Angiosperms
- Clade: Monocots
- Clade: Commelinids
- Order: Poales
- Family: Poaceae
- Subfamily: Pooideae
- Genus: Hordeum
- Species: H. muticum

Binomial name
- Hordeum muticum J.Presl

Synonyms
- Critesion muticum (J.Presl) Á.Löve; Hordeum andicola Griseb.; Hordeum chilense var. muticum (J.Presl) Hauman; Hordeum muticum var. andicola (Griseb.) Thell.; Hordeum secalinum var. andicola (Griseb.) Hauman

Species of plant

Hordeum muticum is a species of wild barley in the grass family Poaceae, native to the high central Andes; Peru, Bolivia, northern Chile, and northern Argentina, and introduced to Ecuador. A diploid, its closest relative is Hordeum cordobense, a lowland species with a more southerly distribution.
