= Hordeum bogdanii =

Conservation status
- Least Concern (IUCN 3.1)

Scientific classification
- Kingdom: Plantae
- Clade: Tracheophytes
- Clade: Angiosperms
- Clade: Monocots
- Clade: Commelinids
- Order: Poales
- Family: Poaceae
- Subfamily: Pooideae
- Genus: Hordeum
- Species: H. bogdanii

Binomial name
- Hordeum bogdanii Wilensky

Synonyms
- Critesion bogdanii (Wilensky) Á.Löve; Hordeum secalinum var. bogdanii (Wilensky) Roshev.

Species of plant

Hordeum bogdanii is a species of flowering plant in the barley genus Hordeum, family Poaceae. It is native to eastern and southern Russia, parts of Siberia, Anatolia, Central Asia, Afghanistan, Pakistan, the western Himalayas, Mongolia, and western and northern China. A diploid perennial and facultative halophyte, it is typically found in wet areas. It is assessed as Least Concern.
