= Hordeum parodii =

Scientific classification
- Kingdom: Plantae
- Clade: Tracheophytes
- Clade: Angiosperms
- Clade: Monocots
- Clade: Commelinids
- Order: Poales
- Family: Poaceae
- Subfamily: Pooideae
- Genus: Hordeum
- Species: H. parodii

Binomial name
- Hordeum parodii Covas

Synonyms
- Critesion parodii (Covas) Á.Löve; Hordeum parodii var. araucanum

Species of grass

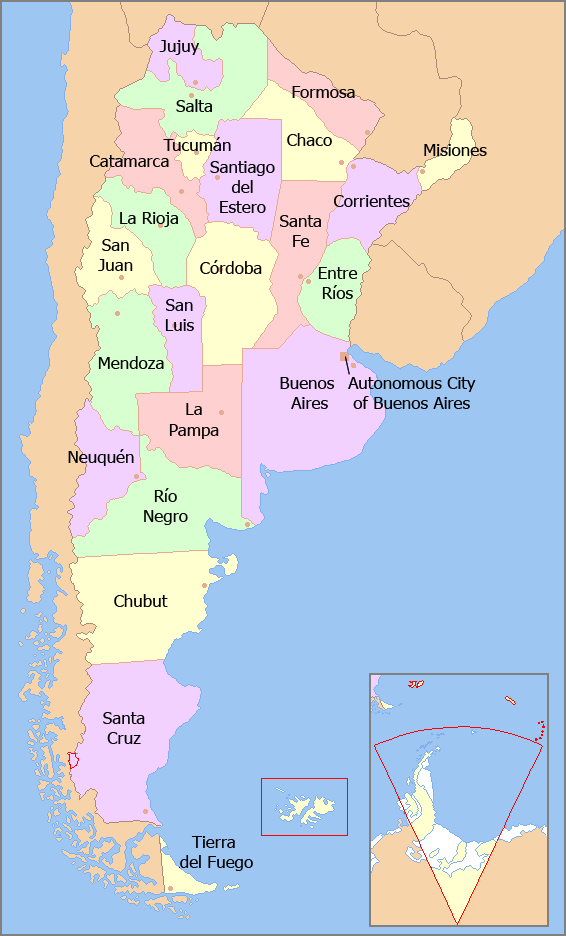
Map of Argentina where Hordeum parodii is native.

Hordeum parodii is a species of barley native to Argentina, where it can be found in inland wetlands, coastal and supratidal lands. H. parodii is a small annual grass forming petite patches of thin, hairy leaves and erect stems to about 10 cm height. First described by Guillermo Covas, from whom it received its current name. H. patagonicum is included in the same family as grass. No subspecies are listed in the Catalog of Life.
