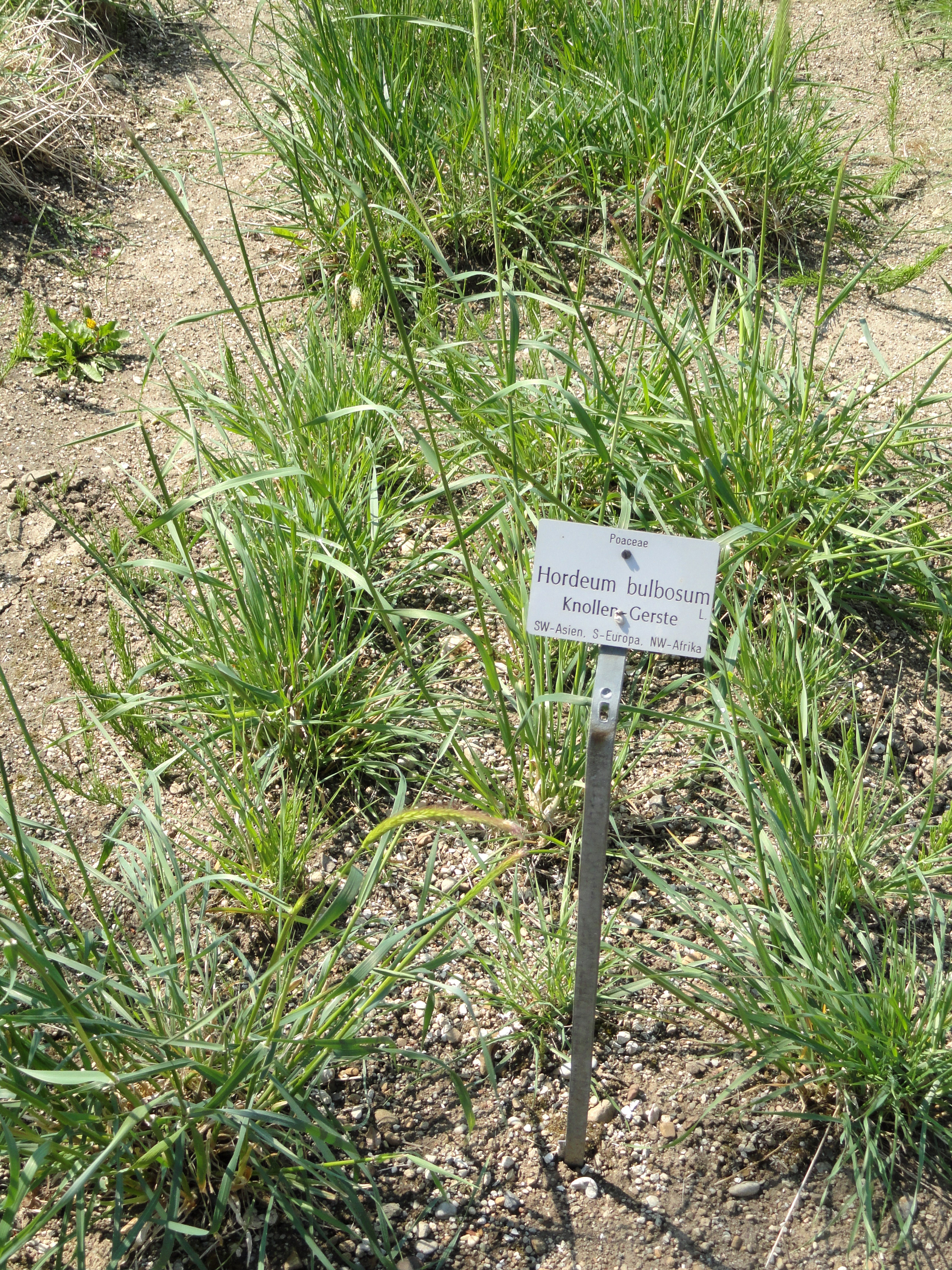
- Hordeum bulbosum at the Botanical Garden Munich-Nymphenburg

Scientific classification
- Kingdom: Plantae
- Clade: Embryophytes
- Clade: Tracheophytes
- Clade: Spermatophytes
- Clade: Angiosperms
- Clade: Monocots
- Clade: Commelinids
- Order: Poales
- Family: Poaceae
- Subfamily: Pooideae
- Genus: Hordeum
- Species: H. bulbosum

Binomial name
- Hordeum bulbosum L.

Synonyms
- List: Critesion bulbosum (L.) Á.Löve; Hordeum brevicomum C.Presl; Hordeum kaufmannii Regel; Hordeum lineare Janka, 1867; Hordeum lycium Boiss.; Hordeum nodosum L.; Hordeum nodosum Ucria; Hordeum strictum Desf.; Zeocriton nodosum (L.) P.Beauv.; Zeocriton strictum (Desf.) P.Beauv.

= Hordeum bulbosum =

Species of plant

Hordeum bulbosum, bulbous barley, is a species of barley native to southern Europe, northern Africa, the Middle East and as far east as Afghanistan, with a few naturalized populations in North America, South America and Australia. Since 1970 it has been used in the Hordeum bulbosum Method (or Technique) to produce doubled haploid (DH) wheat and barley plants by crossing it with T. aestivum or H. vulgare, followed by the elimination of the H. bulbosum chromosomes from the offspring. These DH plants are important in breeding new varieties of wheat and barley, and in scientific studies. H. bulbosum is also being looked at as a source of genes for disease resistance and other traits for barley crop improvement.

Hordeum bulbosum is morphologically similar to wild barley but also differs in being perennial because it forms a bulb organ. The bulb allows the plant to persist through the dry summer by entering dormancy. Increasing day length is associated with the transition from vegetative growth to flowering and with formation of a new bulb. The bulb forms at the lowest internode of the shoot, and is characterized by starch accumulation and tissue enlargement. After flowering and seed production, the plant senesces as temperatures rise and then enters summer dormancy. In the following fall, new shoots arise from buds located around the outside of the bulb.
