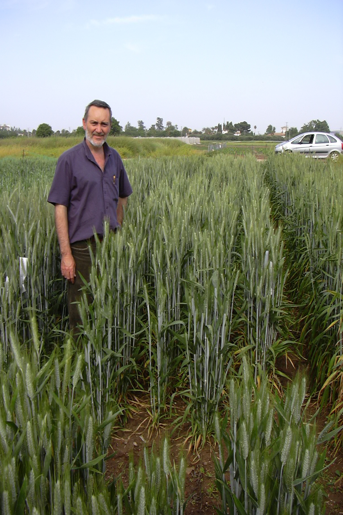

Scientific classification
- Kingdom: Plantae
- Clade: Tracheophytes
- Clade: Angiosperms
- Clade: Monocots
- Clade: Commelinids
- Order: Poales
- Family: Poaceae
- Subfamily: Pooideae
- Tribe: Triticeae
- Genus: × Tritordeum; Asch. & Graebn.

Species
- × Tritordeum martinii A. Pujadas; × Tritordeum strictum Asch. & Graebn.

= × Tritordeum =

Hybrid wheat/barley crop

Tritordeum is a hybrid crop, obtained by crossing durum wheat with the wild barley Hordeum chilense. It has less gliadin (gluten) than wheat, but still performs well in breads, both in terms of dough rising and texture qualities, and in taste-testing, where it substantially outperformed gluten-free breads. It has ten times more lutein, more oleic acid, and more fiber than wheat, giving products made from it a yellower hue and a pleasant flavor profile.

== Taxonomy ==
It was published by Paul Friedrich August Ascherson and Karl Otto Robert Peter Paul Graebner in 1902.

== Agriculture ==
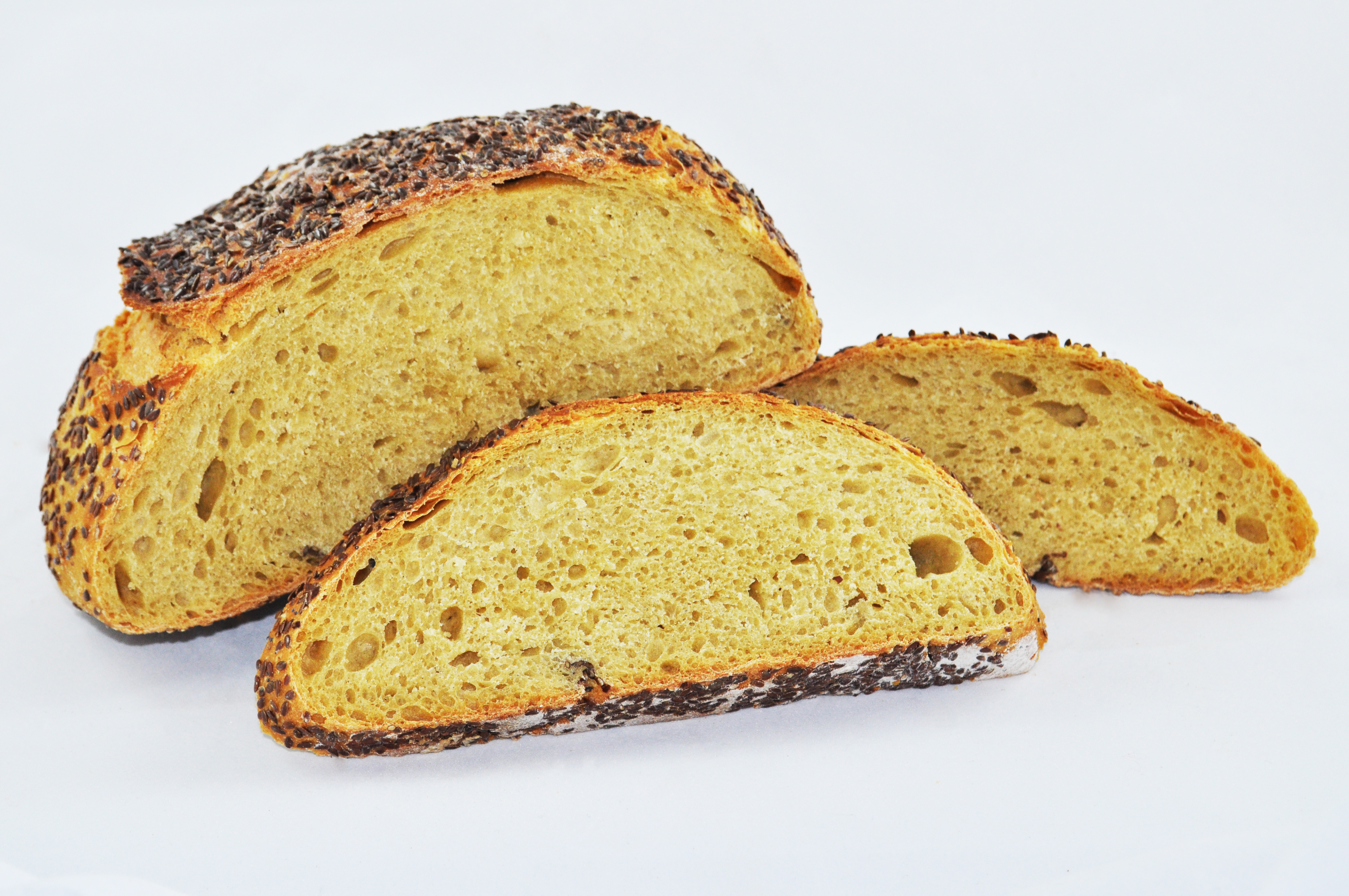
Bread made from Tritordeum has a yellow color

Under development by the Spanish National Research Council since 1977, it was launched onto the market in April 2013 by the start-up Agrasys company created under the auspices of the University of Barcelona to commercialize the cereal. It is planted on about 1300 ha in Portugal, Spain, France, Italy and Turkey. It does better in hotter and drier growing conditions than wheat, using less water. Because of this water-saving feature, it won first prize for a Sustainable Ingredient in the 2018 Sustainable Food Awards organized by Ecovia Intelligence.
