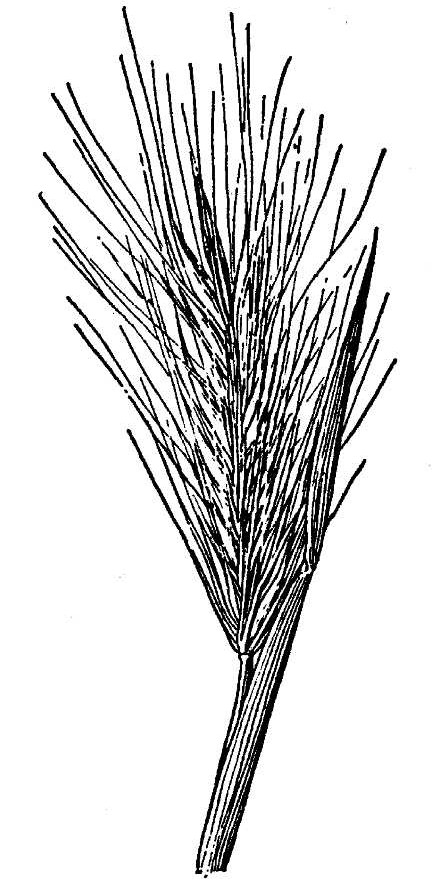

Scientific classification
- Kingdom: Plantae
- Clade: Tracheophytes
- Clade: Angiosperms
- Clade: Monocots
- Clade: Commelinids
- Order: Poales
- Family: Poaceae
- Subfamily: Pooideae
- Genus: Hordeum
- Species: H. arizonicum

Binomial name
- Hordeum arizonicum Covas

= Hordeum arizonicum =

Species of grass

Hordeum arizonicum is a species of wild barley known by the common name Arizona barley. It is native to northern Mexico and the southwestern United States, where it grows in wet spots in desert regions, such as irrigation ditches. It can grow in somewhat saline soils. This is an annual or perennial grass forming erections 20 to 70 cm high. The inflorescence is a spike up to about 12 cm long made up of spikelets up to about 3 cm long each, usually tipped with awns.
