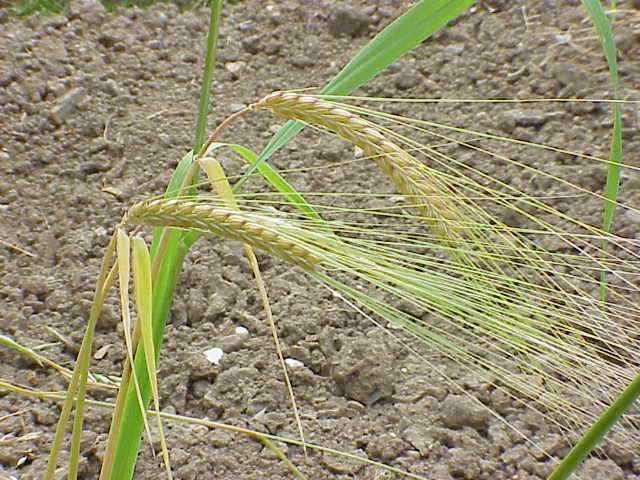
- Hordeum vulgare f. distichon

Scientific classification
- Kingdom: Plantae
- Clade: Tracheophytes
- Clade: Angiosperms
- Clade: Monocots
- Clade: Commelinids
- Order: Poales
- Family: Poaceae
- Subfamily: Pooideae
- Supertribe: Triticodae
- Tribe: Triticeae
- Genus: Hordeum; L.

Type species
- Hordeum vulgare L.

Synonyms
- Critesion Raf.; Critho E.Mey.; Zeocriton Wolf

= Hordeum =

Genus of grasses

Hordeum is a genus of annual and perennial plants in the grass family. The species are native throughout the temperate regions of Africa, Eurasia, and the Americas.

== Taxonomy ==
=== Species ===
Species include:

- Hordeum aegiceras – Mongolia, China including Tibet
- Hordeum arizonicum US (CA AZ NV NM), Mexico (Baja California, Sonora, Durango)
- Hordeum bogdanii – from Turkey and European Russia to Mongolia
- Hordeum brachyantherum – Russia (Kuril, Kamchatka), Alaska, Canada including Yukon, US (mostly in the West but also scattered locales in the East), Baja California
- Hordeum brachyatherum – Chile
- Hordeum brevisubulatum – European Russia; temperate and subarctic Asia from Turkey and the Urals to China and Magadan
- Hordeum bulbosum – Mediterranean, Central Asia
- Hordeum californicum – US (CA; OR; NV)
- Hordeum capense – South Africa, Lesotho
- Hordeum chilense – Argentina, Chile (including Juan Fernández Is)
- Hordeum comosum – Argentina, Chile
- Hordeum cordobense – northern Argentina
- Hordeum depressum – US (CA; OR; WA; ID; NV), British Columbia, Baja California
- Hordeum distichon – Iraq
- Hordeum erectifolium – northern Argentina
- Hordeum euclaston – Brazil, Uruguay, Argentina
- Hordeum flexuosum – Uruguay, Argentina
- Hordeum fuegianum – Tierra del Fuego
- Hordeum guatemalense – Guatemala
- Hordeum halophilum – Argentina, Chile, Bolivia, Peru
- Hordeum intercedens (bobtail barley) – California, Baja California
- Hordeum jubatum (foxtail barley) – widespread in US and Canada; Asiatic Russia, Inner Mongolia, Central Asia, Caucasus
- Hordeum × lagunculciforme – Iraq, Turkmenistan, Himalayas, western China
- Hordeum lechleri – Argentina, Chile
- Hordeum marinum (sea barley) – Europe, North Africa, southwestern and central Asia
- Hordeum murinum (wall barley) – Canary Islands, Europe, North Africa, southwestern and central Asia
- Hordeum muticum – Argentina, Chile, Bolivia, Peru
- Hordeum parodii – Argentina
- Hordeum patagonicum – Argentina, Chile
- Hordeum × pavisii – France
- Hordeum procerum – Argentina
- Hordeum pubiflorum – Argentina, Chile
- Hordeum pusillum (little barley) – widespread in Canada and US; northern Mexico, Bermuda, Argentina
- Hordeum roshevitzii – China, Korea, Primorye, Mongolia, Siberia, Kazakhstan
- Hordeum secalinum – Europe, Mediterranean, Caucasus
- Hordeum spontaneum – from Greece and Egypt to central China
- Hordeum stenostachys – Brazil, Argentina, Uruguay, South Africa
- Hordeum tetraploidum – Argentina, Chile
- Hordeum vulgare (barley) – native to the Middle East, now cultivated in many countries

==== Formerly included species ====
Botanists now regard many species as better suited to other genera: Arrhenatherum, Crithopsis, Dasypyrum, Elymus, Eremopyrum, Hordelymus, Leymus, Psathyrostachys, and Taeniatherum.

=== Etymology ===
The name Hordeum comes from the Latin word for "to bristle" (horreō, horrēre), and is akin to the word "horror".

== Distribution ==
The species are native throughout the temperate regions of Africa, Eurasia, and the Americas.

== Ecology ==
Hordeum species are used as food plants by the larvae of some Lepidoptera species, including the flame, rustic shoulder-knot and setaceous Hebrew character.

Some species have become weeds introduced worldwide by human activities, others have become endangered due to habitat loss.

== Uses ==
One species, H. vulgare (barley), has become of major commercial importance as a cereal grain, used as fodder crop and for malting in the production of beer and whiskey.
