= Hordeum aegiceras =

Scientific classification
- Kingdom: Plantae
- Clade: Tracheophytes
- Clade: Angiosperms
- Clade: Monocots
- Clade: Commelinids
- Order: Poales
- Family: Poaceae
- Subfamily: Pooideae
- Genus: Hordeum
- Species: H. aegiceras

Binomial name
- Hordeum aegiceras Nees ex Royle

Synonyms
- Critho aegiceras (Nees ex Royle) E.Mey.; Hordeum coeleste var. trifurcatum Schltdl.; Hordeum nepalense Sweet; Hordeum trifurcatum (Schltdl.) Wender.; Hordeum vulgare subsp. aegiceras (Nees ex Royle) Á.Löve; Hordeum vulgare var. aegiceras (Nees ex Royle) Aitch.; Hordeum vulgare var. trifurcatum (Schltdl.) Alef.

Species of plant

Hordeum aegiceras (syn. Hordeum vulgare var. trifurcatum), the grim barley, is a species of flowering plant in the family Poaceae. It is native to Mongolia, Tibet, Qinghai, and central China, and it has been introduced into other locales around the world, including Argentina and the U.S. state of Illinois. An annual reaching 40 to 80 cm (16 to 31 in), it is cultivated at elevations above 3,000 m (9,800 ft).
