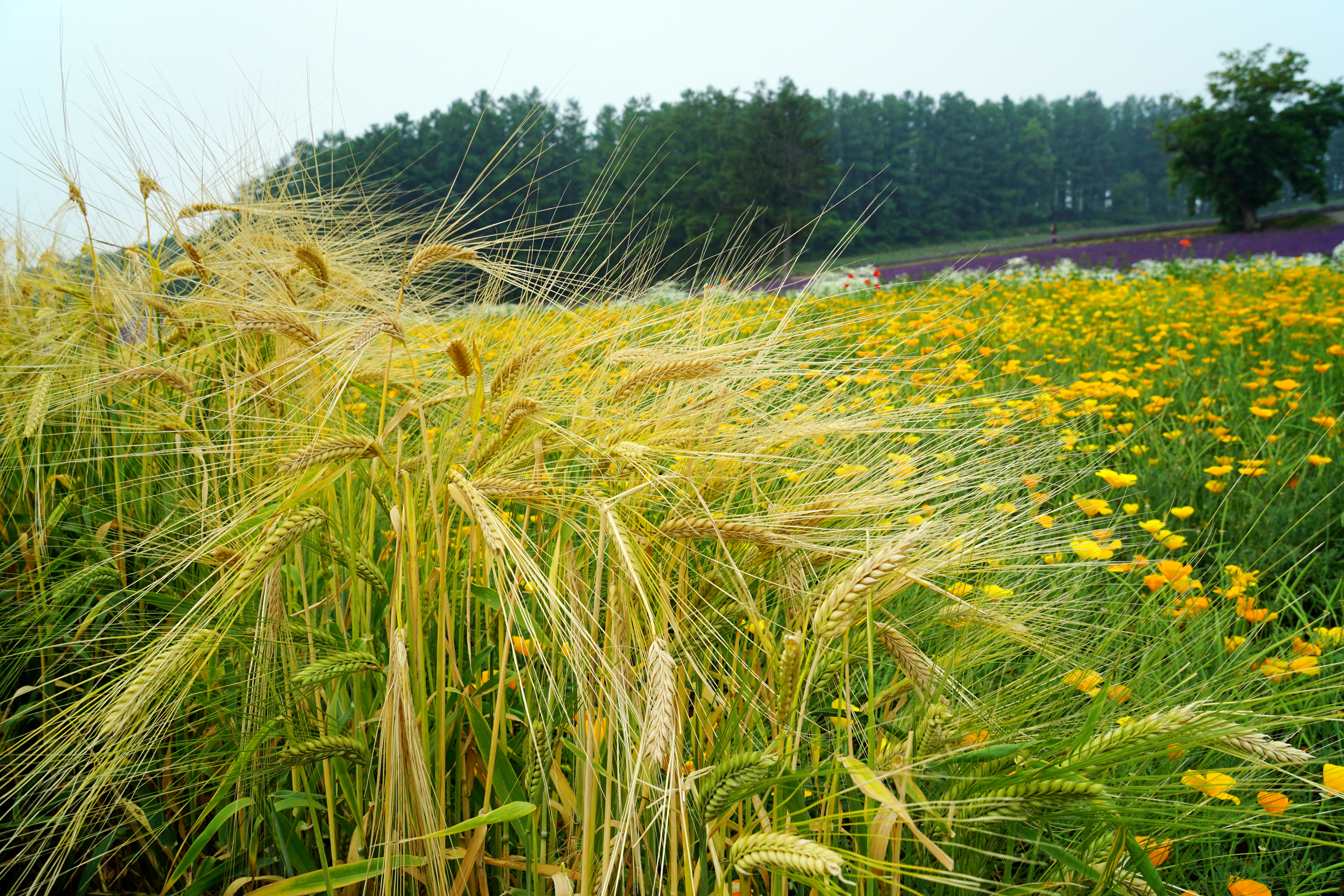
- In a farmfield in Japan
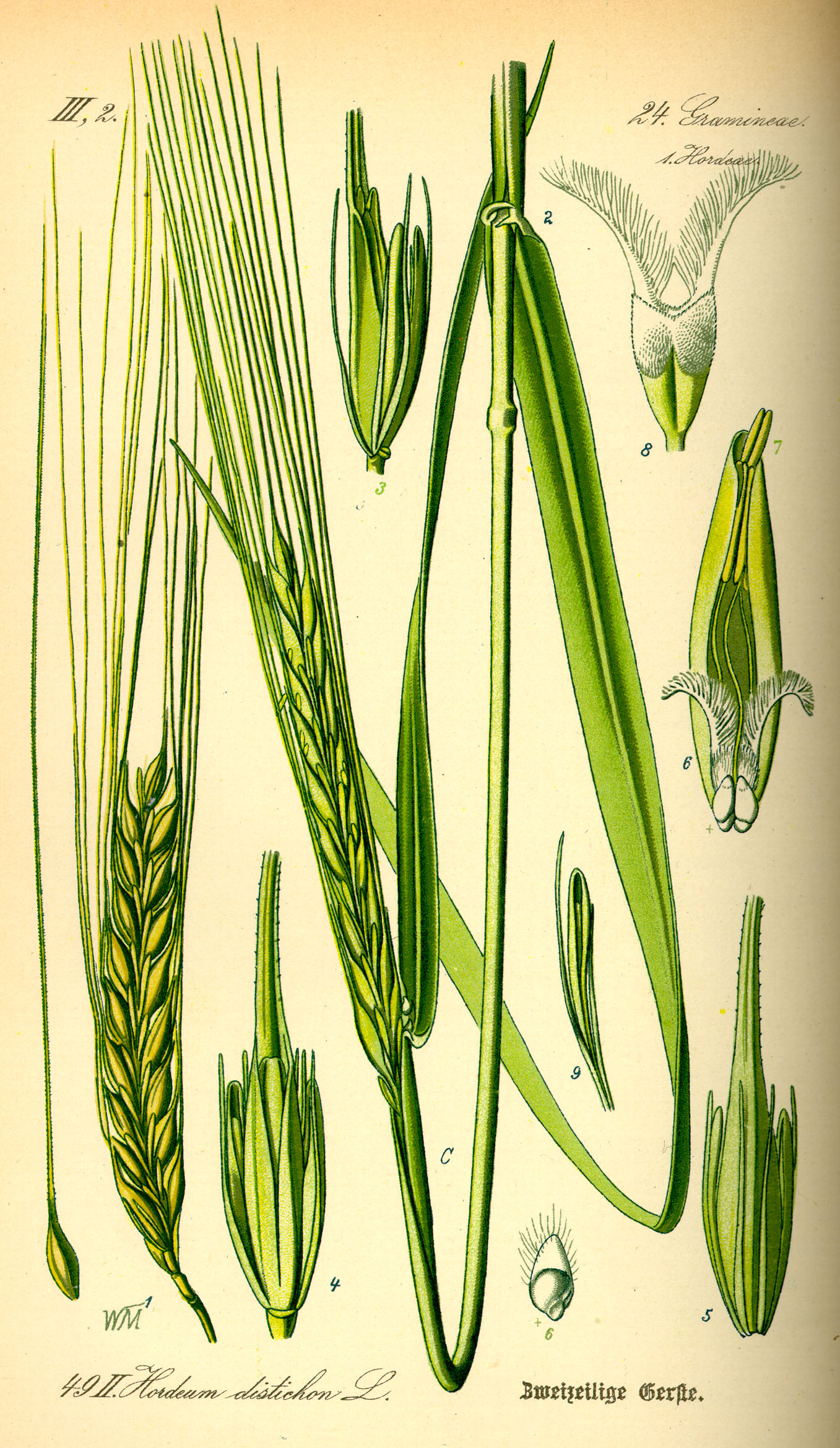
- Botanical illustration

Scientific classification
- Kingdom: Plantae
- Clade: Embryophytes
- Clade: Tracheophytes
- Clade: Spermatophytes
- Clade: Angiosperms
- Clade: Monocots
- Clade: Commelinids
- Order: Poales
- Family: Poaceae
- Subfamily: Pooideae
- Genus: Hordeum
- Species: H. distichon

Binomial name
- Hordeum distichon L.

Synonyms
- List: Hordeum anglicum Gand.; Hordeum bohemicum R.E.Regel; Hordeum chevalieri R.E.Regel; Hordeum colchicum R.E.Regel; Hordeum deficiens Steud. ex A.Braun; Hordeum distichon convar. nudum (L.) Tzvelev; Hordeum distichon convar. zeocriton (L.) Tzvelev; Hordeum elisabethpolense R.E.Regel; Hordeum eriwanense R.E.Regel; Hordeum europaeum R.E.Regel; Hordeum germanicum R.E.Regel; Hordeum glabrum R.E.Regel; Hordeum imberbe Ard. ex Roem. & Schult.; Hordeum irregulare Åberg & Wiebe; Hordeum kentii R.E.Regel; Hordeum korshinskianum R.E.Regel; Hordeum laxum R.E.Regel; Hordeum lenkoranicum R.E.Regel; Hordeum macrolepis A.Braun; Hordeum monticola R.E.Regel; Hordeum nudideficiens R.E.Regel; Hordeum praecocius R.E.Regel; Hordeum princeps R.E.Regel; Hordeum richardsonii R.E.Regel; Hordeum scandinavicum R.E.Regel; Hordeum suecicum R.E.Regel; Hordeum turkestanicum R.E.Regel; Hordeum vilmorianum R.E.Regel; Hordeum volhynicum R.E.Regel; Hordeum vulgare subsp. deficiens (Steud. ex A.Braun) Á.Löve; Hordeum vulgare subsp. distichon (L.) Körn.; Hordeum werneri R.E.Regel; Hordeum wolgense R.E.Regel; Hordeum zeocriton L.; Zeocriton commune P.Beauv.; Zeocriton distichon (L.) P.Beauv.; Zeocriton vulgare Gray

= Hordeum distichon =

Species of plant

Hordeum distichon, the common barley or two-rowed barley, is a cultigen of barley, family Poaceae. It is native to Iraq, and is widely grown throughout temperate regions of the world. Some authorities consider it a subspecies of six-rowed barley, Hordeum vulgare. It is the principal raw material for malting and brewing beer in Europe, as it is lower in protein than the six-rowed barley usually used in North America.
