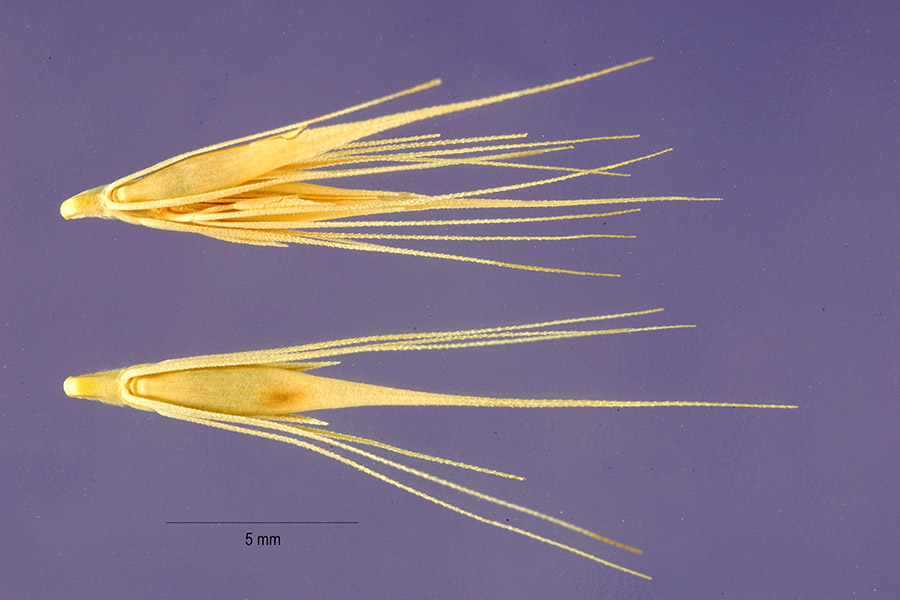

Scientific classification
- Kingdom: Plantae
- Clade: Tracheophytes
- Clade: Angiosperms
- Clade: Monocots
- Clade: Commelinids
- Order: Poales
- Family: Poaceae
- Subfamily: Pooideae
- Genus: Hordeum
- Species: H. depressum

Binomial name
- Hordeum depressum (Scribn. & J.G. Sm.) Rydb.

= Hordeum depressum =

Species of grass

Hordeum depressum is a species of barley known by the common names low barley and dwarf barley. It is native to the western United States from Idaho to California, where it can be found in moist habitats such as vernal pools. This is a small annual grass forming petite patches of thin, hairy leaves and erect stems to half a meter in maximum height. The green or reddish green inflorescence is 2 to 6 centimeters long and about half a centimeter wide. Like other barleys the spikelets come in triplets. There is a large fertile central spikelet about a centimeter long and two smaller, often sterile spikelets on pedicels, each 3 to 5 millimeters long.
