= Lucien Leon Hauman =

Belgian botanist (1880–1965)

Lucien Leon Hauman-Merck (8 July 1880, in Ixelles – 16 September 1965, in Brussels) was a Belgian botanist who studied and collected plants in South America and Africa.

He received his education in Gembloux, and afterwards relocated to Argentina, where he obtained a position in the department of agronomy and veterinary medicine at the University of Buenos Aires. From 1904 to 1925, he taught classes in botany, plant pathology and agricultural microbiology at the university. In 1910, he laid the foundations for its botanical garden.

In Argentina he conducted important phytogeographical research, and he also performed plant collection duties that involved excursions to Paraguay, Chile and Uruguay. In 1927, he returned to Europe, where from 1928 to 1949, he served as a professor of botany at the Free University of Brussels. During this time period, he studied African flora, about which, he collected numerous plants in the Belgian Congo. In 1949, he returned to Argentina as an honorary professor at the University of Buenos Aires. The "Jardín Botánico Lucien Hauman" at the university is named in his honor.

The genera Haumania (J.Léonard, 1949) and Haumaniastrum (P.A.Duvign. et Plancke, 1959) commemorate his name, as do species with the epithet of haumanii.

== Honours ==
- 1932: Commander in the Order of Leopold.

== Selected works ==
- Note préliminaire sur les Hordeum spontanés de la flore Argentine
- Catalogue des phanérogames de l'Argentine, 1917 – Catalog of phanerogams native to Argentina.
- La végétation des hautes cordillères de Mendoza, 1918 – Vegetation of the high Cordillera of Mendoza.
- Le végétation de l'île de Martín García dans le Río de la Plata, 1925 – Vegetation of Martín García Island in the Rio de Plata.
- La vegetacion de la Argentina, 1947 – Vegetation of Argentina.
