= Elisa G. Nicora =

Argentine botanist

- Born: March 8, 1912; Buenos Aires, Argentina
- Died: February 9, 2001 (aged 88); Buenos Aires, Argentina
- Scientific career
- Fields: Botany, agrostology
- Author abbrev. (botany): Nicora

Elisa Gernaela Juana Raquel Nicora de Panza (1912–2001) was an Argentine botanist noted for her research on grasses, especially Malpighiaceae, Caryophyllaceae, Gramineae. She was a founding member of the Argentine Society of Botany, and was a curator at two herbaria. The standard author abbreviation Nicora is used to indicate this person as the author when citing a botanical name. In the course of her career, she described over sixty species and gathered thousands of specimens.
