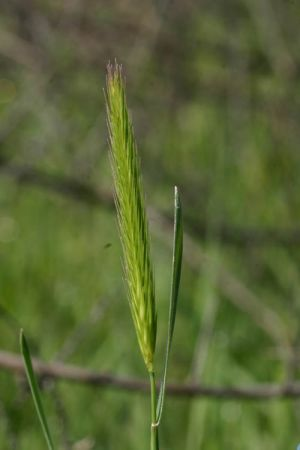

Scientific classification
- Kingdom: Plantae
- Clade: Tracheophytes
- Clade: Angiosperms
- Clade: Monocots
- Clade: Commelinids
- Order: Poales
- Family: Poaceae
- Subfamily: Pooideae
- Genus: Hordeum
- Species: H. brachyantherum

Binomial name
- Hordeum brachyantherum Nevski

= Hordeum brachyantherum =

Species of grass

Hordeum brachyantherum, known by the common name meadow barley, is a species of barley. It is native to western North America from Alaska to northern Mexico, coastal areas of easternmost Russia (Kamchatka), and a small area of coastal Newfoundland.

The diploid cytotype occurs only in California, throughout the state, while everywhere else plants are tetraploid.

This is a tufting perennial bunchgrass approaching a meter in maximum height. It produces compact, narrow inflorescences 8 to 10 centimeters long and purplish in color. Like other barleys the spikelets come in triplets. It has two small, often sterile lateral spikelets on pedicels and a larger, fertile central spikelet lacking a pedicel.

== General information ==
Hordeum brachyantherum belongs to grass family, Poaceae, genus Hordeum. There are two common cytotypes of Hordeum brachyantherum. The diploid mainly grow in California, the tetraploid grow widely over the world. Polyploidy is very common in plants. Polyploidization plays an important role in plant evolution, it is commonly used in agriculture to develop novel phenotypes. Polyploidization also occurs naturally in plant populations. In 1980, a rare hexaploid form of Hordeum brachyantherum was discovered in California within the populations of diploid and tetraploid Hordeum brachyantherum. It was hypothesized that this hexaploid form was evolved by outcrossing between diploid Hordeum marine and tetraploid Hordeum brachyantherum ssp. brachyantherum and followed by duplication of chromosome. Polyploidization may lead to speciation because the reproductive isolation may develop between hexaploid and either tetraploid or diploid due to the mistake of alignment during meiosis.

== Homology ==
Hordeum contains a gene called hordoindoline that affects grain hardness and antimicrobial activity. Since wheat contains a homologous gene named puroindoline, it was concluded that Hordeum and wheat shared a common ancestor during the evolutionary process. Novel variants of hordoindoline genes were found in Hordeum brachyantherum, and it was hypothesized that the novel genes arose from gene duplication at an early stage of the divergence of the genus Hordeum. Some of the non-synonymous mutations are beneficial and show an overall improved antifungal activity. These non-synonymous mutations provide material for evolution because natural selection can select for organisms possessing these mutations and alter the allele frequency over time.

== Salinity ==
Natural selection can also act on salinity tolerance for many plants. High salinity may negatively impact germination success, plant growth, and survival. Thus, under evolutionary process including natural selection, some plants developed morphological and physiological adaptations to live in high salinity conditions. The effect of salinity on germination rate shows both inter-specific and intra-specific variation. Compared to other perennial plants such as Agrostis stolonifera, Hordeum brachyantherum is more tolerated under high salinity. The seedling lengths and root or shoot lengths show different responses to high salinity. The seedling lengths of Hordeum brachyantherum are more negatively affected by high salinity. The intra-specific variation in the ability to tolerate elevated salinity among populations of Hordeum brachyantherum may result from the genetic variation which underlines the basis of evolution of Hordeum brachyantherum.

== Ecology ==
One major function of perennial plants is to restore the land and ecosystem. Hordeum brachyantherum is used to restore the native perennial grasslands in California and to reduce the density of non-native annual plants. The perennial plants can rapidly recover the soil microbial biomass in the grasslands due to the carbon supply maintained by the perennial plants. The species diversity and composition is not affected by the restoration, however, the relative proportion of the native plant biomass increased in the restored perennial grassland.
