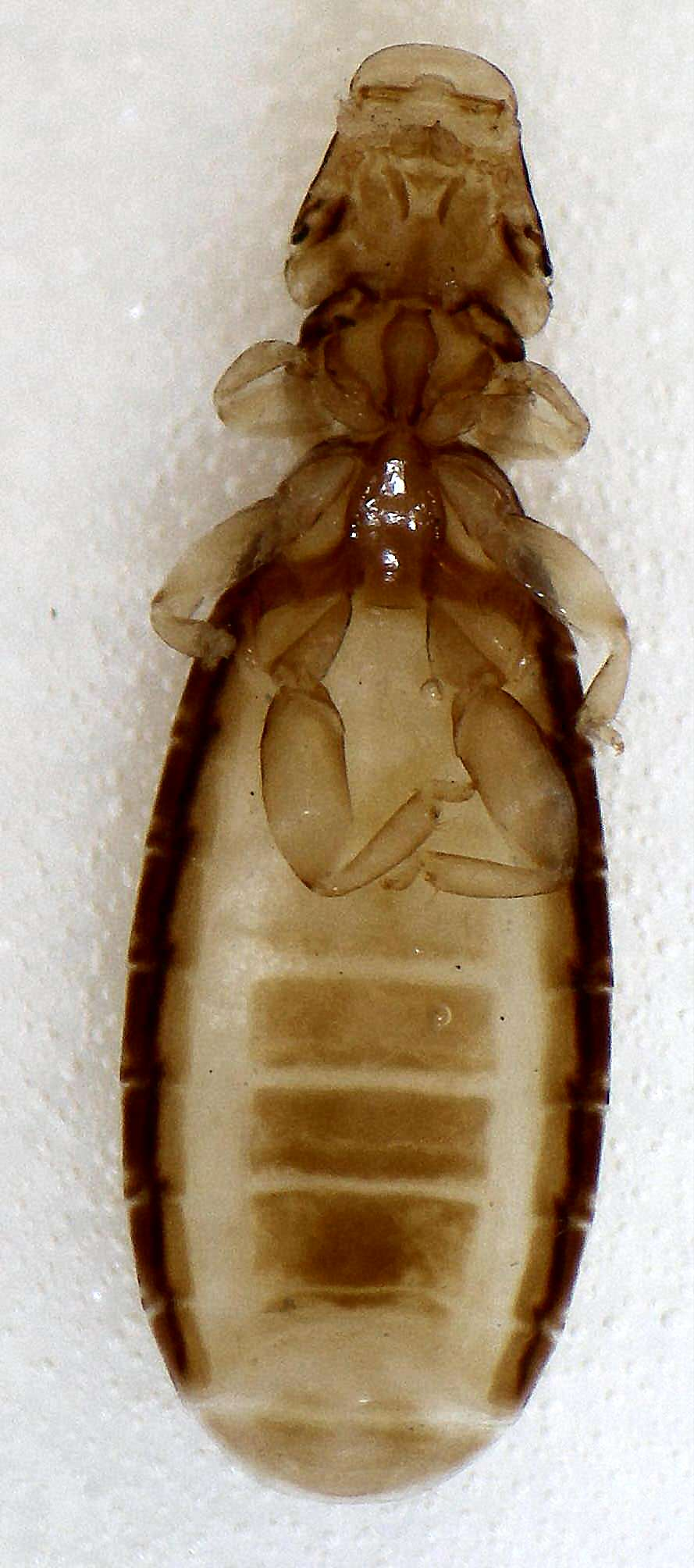
- Ricinus bombycillae (Ricinidae) from a Bohemian waxwing

Scientific classification
- Kingdom: Animalia
- Phylum: Arthropoda
- Clade: Pancrustacea
- Class: Insecta
- Order: Psocodea
- Suborder: Troctomorpha
- Infraorder: Phthiraptera
- Parvorder: Amblycera; Kellogg, 1896

Families
- Menoponidae; Laemobothriidae; Ricinidae; Boopiidae; Gyropidae; Trimenoponidae

= Amblycera =

Parvorder of lice

Amblycera is a parvorder of chewing lice from the infraorder Phthiraptera. The lice are ectoparasites and spend their entire lives parasitizing their hosts. Amblycera tend to mostly feed on birds, and have specialized anatomy to assist in feeding. The lice undergo a three-part process of metamorphosis and survive around thirty days after moulting into an adult. They rely on a combination of skin debris and blood for nutrients to sustain themselves. Amblycera are distributed globally and are very host–specific.

== Classification ==
Amblycera is currently classified as a parvorder, and it was named by Kellogg in 1896. Amblycera belongs to the infraorder Phthiraptera, which contains all lice, and is part of the larger order Psocodea, which also contains booklice, barklice and barkflies. Around 30% of all bird lice belong to Amblycera. A cladogram showing the position of Amblycera within Phthiraptera and Psocodea is shown below:

- Psocodea
  - - Troctomorpha
      - - - Phthiraptera
            - - Philopteridae
              - - - Anoplura
                  - Rhynchophthirina
                - Trichodectidae
            - Amblycera
          - Liposcelididae
        - - Pachytroctidae
          - Sphaeropsocidae
      - Amphientometae
    - Psocomorpha
      - - - Homilopsocidea
          - Caeciliusetae
        - - - Psocetae
            - Epipsocetae
          - Philotarsetae
      - Archipsocetae
  - Trogiomorpha
    - - Atropetae
      - Psyllipsocetae
    - Prionoglaridetae (paraphyletic)

== Characteristics ==
Like all chewing lice, Amblycera are permanent ectoparasites of their hosts, in that they spend their entire life living off of their individual host. Almost all Amblycera exclusively parasitize birds. In a section of their throat called the crop, Amblycera contain developed comb structures at the base. The structures are used to prevent feathers and other debris from progressing further into the digestive system. All species are wingless, and have a broad head with a pair of mandibles. The antennae are broken into three to five joints depending on the species, and they do not have any eyes. Anmblycera also have two small segmented claws at the end of their limbs. Species are small and dorsoventrally compressed, and are host specific in that a single species will parasitize on a single host. They can vary between one and five millimeters long, and range in color from white to black.

=== Life cycle ===
Amblycera undergo a process of metamorphosis with three stages: Eggs (also known as "nits"), nymph and adult. The process usually takes around two to three weeks on average. Eggs are usually 0.8 millimeters long and oval shaped. The eggs also have small holes called micropyles that allow for respiration. They range in color from yellow to white. The nymphs are also yellow to white in color, and undergo a three part process of moulting over the course of a week. After the third nymph moult the lice are considered adults, and will live up to thirty days off of their chosen host.

=== Distribution ===
Like all lice, Amblycera are distributed in the same locations as their preferred host. The lice were likely spread during the original human colonization of various continents when host animals were brought along with them. The most diverse family, Menoponidae, has a high quantity of host-specific species is distributed across multiple continents. Amblycera have shown a positive correlation between the quantity and diversity of host birds in regions and the quantity and diversity of their own species.

== Feeding method ==
Amblycera feed almost entirely on birds. The lice depend on a combination of skin, hair, feathers and blood for food and nutrients. They use their mandibles in a horizontal scraping fashion to separate the skin from the bird so that it can be consumed. They also use their claws to grasp onto the feathers of the host in order to prevent the bird from shaking the lice off. They feed on both living and dead cells, as opposed to the closely related ischnoceran lice that feeds exclusively on dead material. While most ampblyceran lice use mandibles to feed, species in the genus Trochiloecete use two sharp stylets to pierce the skin and consume blood from nearby blood vessels. Amblycera lice tend to parasitize one host before quickly moving onto another one, without staying nearby one that is dead.

== Effects ==
The lice by themselves are not particularly harmful, however depending on the quantity the presence of Amblycera on birds they can cause dermatitis and promote itchiness and scratching. In poultry, the lice can significantly reduce the rate of egg production. Birds with physically damaged bodies are vulnerable to Amblycera infestations due to the reduced ability to remove the lice by themselves. Birds infested with Amblycera also have a reduced ability to attract mating partners.

== Families ==
Amblycera contain six individual families of parasitic lice:

- Menoponidae Mjöberg, 1910
- Laemobothriidae Mjöberg 1910
- Ricinidae Neumann 1890
- Boopiidae Mjöberg, 1910
- Gyropidae Kellogg, 1896
- Trimenoponidae Neumann 1890

Note: Abrocomophagidae Emerson & Price 1976 is no longer considered valid, and has merged with Gyropidae.
