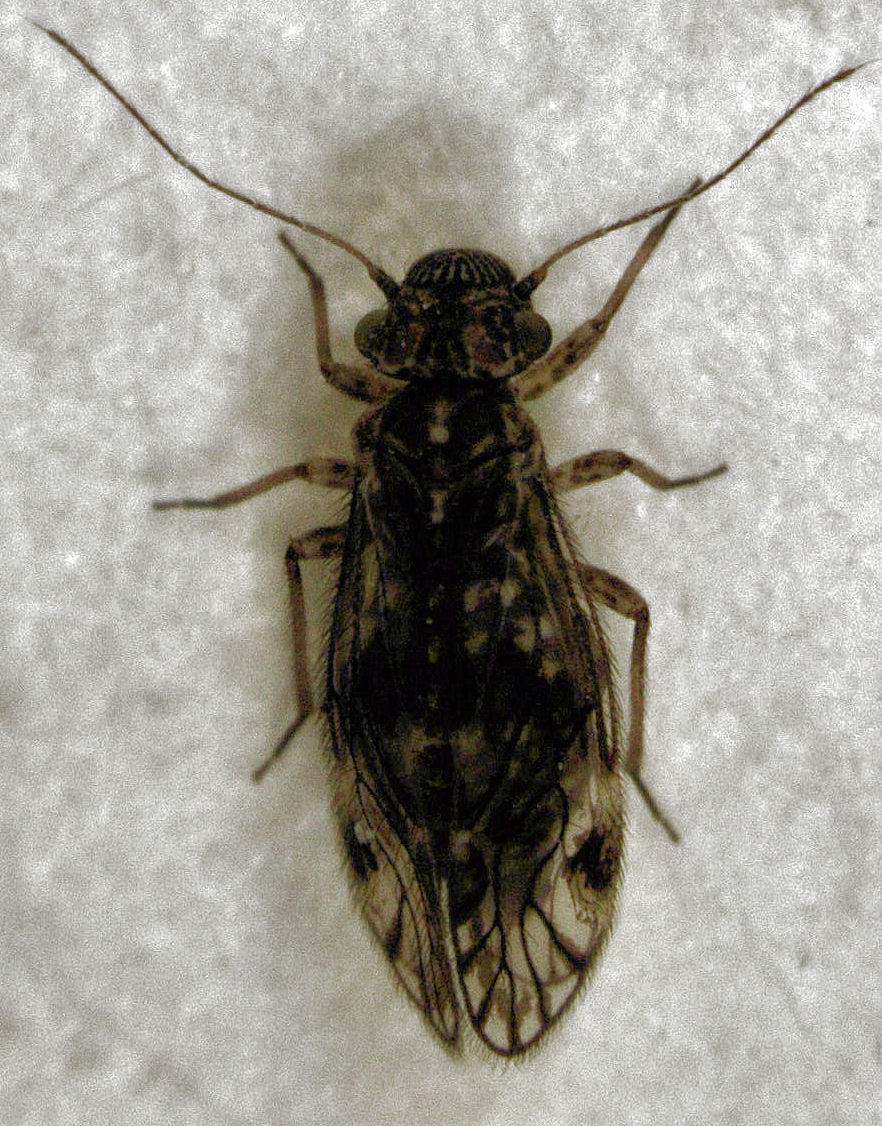
- Philotarsopsis guttata

Scientific classification
- Kingdom: Animalia
- Phylum: Arthropoda
- Class: Insecta
- Order: Psocodea
- Suborder: Psocomorpha
- Infraorder: Philotarsetae

Families
- Philotarsidae; Pseudocaeciliidae; Trichopsocidae

= Philotarsetae =

Group of booklice

Philotarsetae is an infraorder of bark lice in the order Psocodea (formerly Psocoptera), within the suborder Psocomorpha.

== Phylogeny ==
The below cladogram of Psocodea shows the position of Philotarsetae within Psocomorpha:

- Psocodea
  - - Troctomorpha
      - - - Phthiraptera
            - - Philopteridae
              - - - Anoplura
                  - Rhynchophthirina
                - Trichodectidae
            - Amblycera
          - Liposcelididae
        - - Pachytroctidae
          - Sphaeropsocidae
      - Amphientometae
    - Psocomorpha
      - - - Homilopsocidea
          - Caeciliusetae
        - - - Psocetae
            - Epipsocetae
          - Philotarsetae
      - Archipsocetae
  - Trogiomorpha
    - - Atropetae
      - Psyllipsocetae
    - Prionoglaridetae (paraphyletic)

== Families ==
These three families belong to the infraorder Philotarsetae:

- Philotarsidae Pearman, 1936 (loving barklice)
- Pseudocaeciliidae Pearman, 1936 (false lizard barklice)
- Trichopsocidae Pearman, 1936 (lash-faced psocids)
