= Lebanese amber =

Fossilized resin found in Yemen

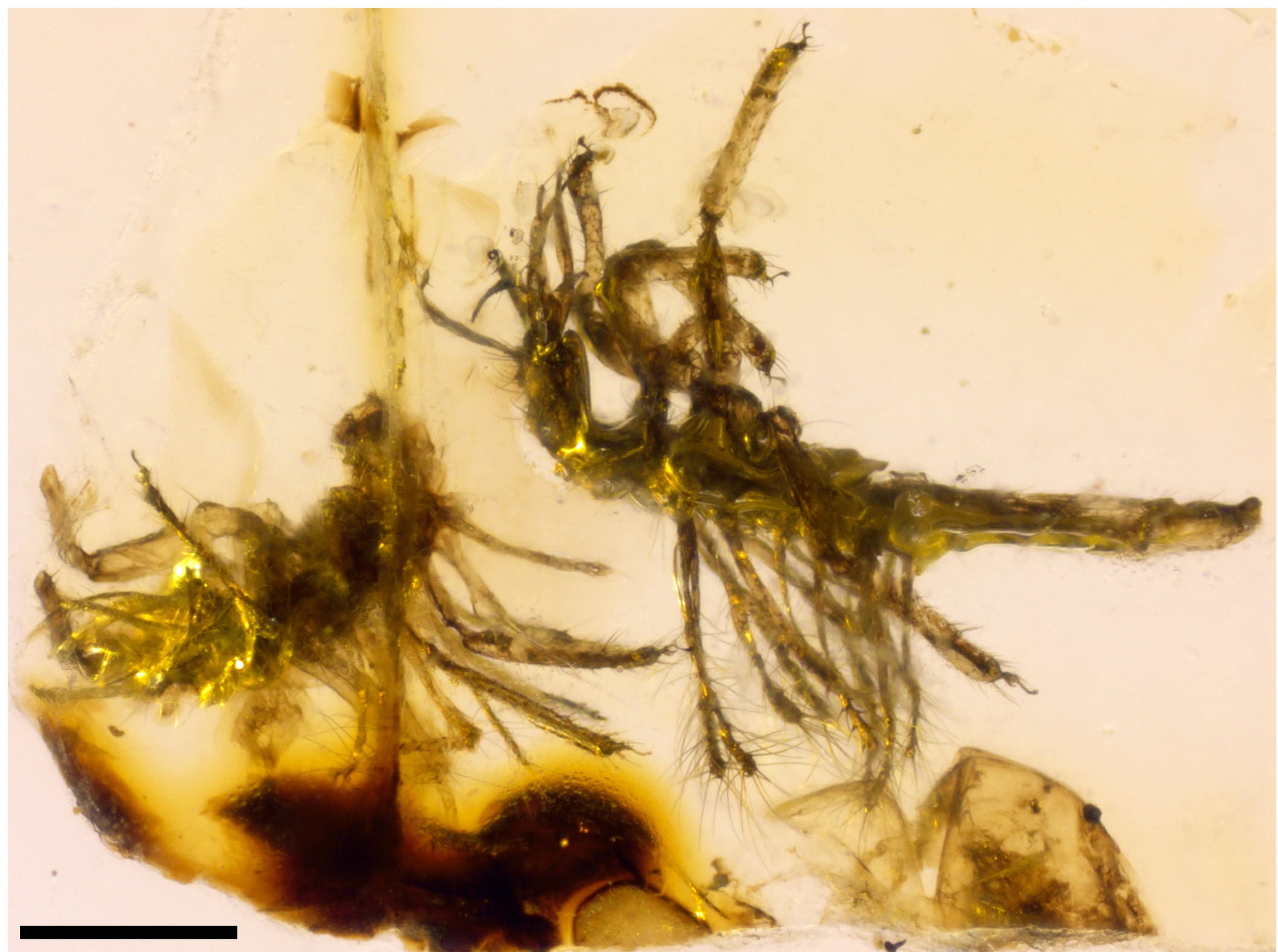
Tragichrysa ovoruptora, a green lacewing larvae

Lebanese amber is fossilized resin found in Lebanon and surrounding countries. A majority of the amber with fossil inclusions has been found within 3 layers of the Grès du Liban alloformation, which dates back approximately 130-125 million years to the Hauterivian of the Early Cretaceous. Upper Jurassic Kimmeridgian amber has also been found in Lebanon from the Bhannes formation, but so far only one locality, Aintourine, has produced inclusions. The main amber deposit was formed on what was then the northern coast of Gondwana, probably within a tropical or subtropical zone in a temperate or hot climate. Analysis of the sediment from the site indicate the amber was produced in coastal, possibly estuarine conditions.

It is the oldest source of amber with a significant number of inclusions. Up to 300 sources of Lebanese amber have been recovered and 17 of them are important sources of organic inclusions, which are the oldest of their kind. The inclusions help to document Cretaceous fauna and flora.

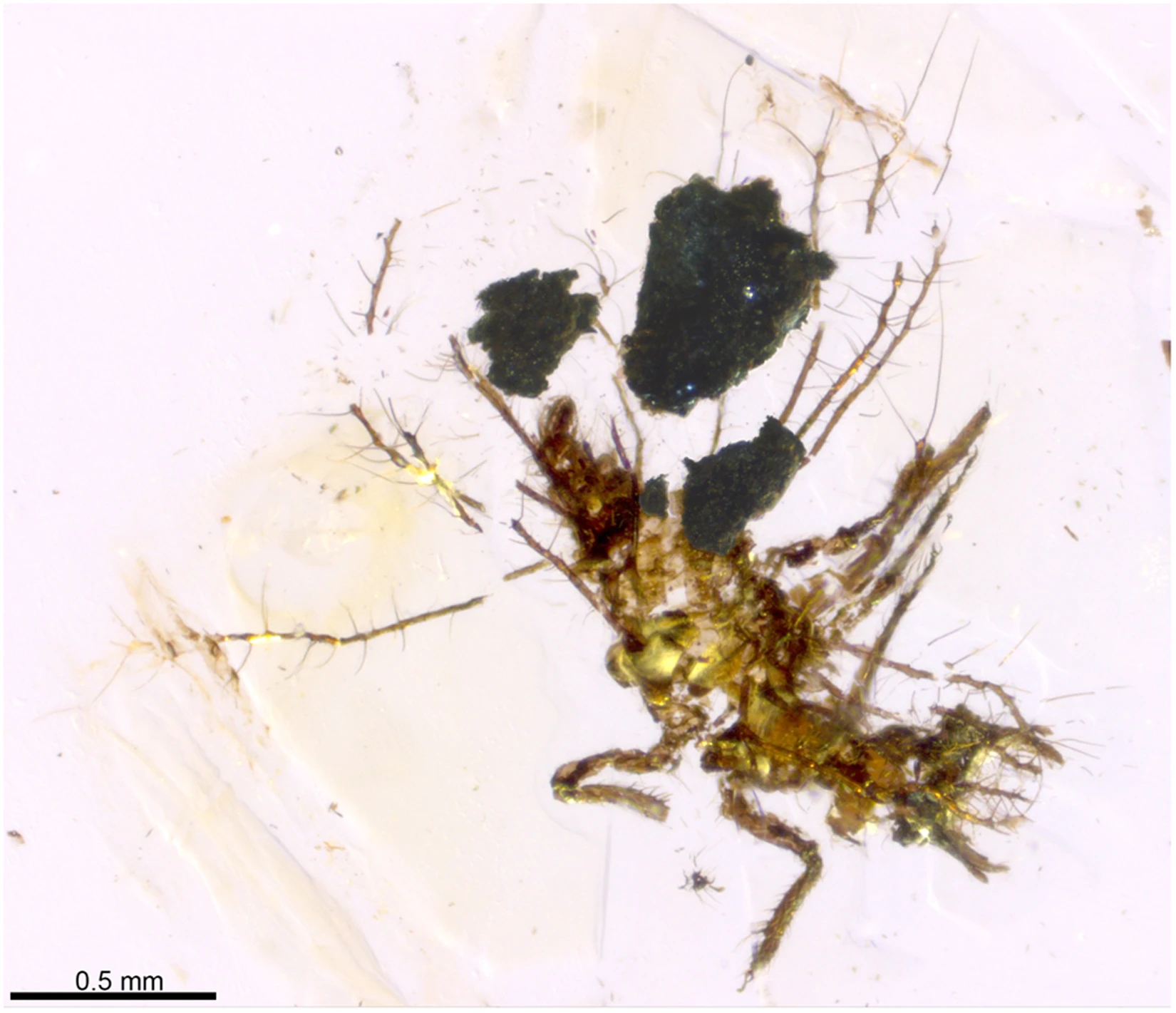
Tyruschrysa melqart, a green lacewing larvae

== Origins ==
Lebanese amber can be found in Lebanon and neighboring areas of the Levant. Up to 300 different sources of amber had been discovered by 2010. The amber was deposited in the Cretaceous era and is rich in fossil synclusions. 19 of the discovered sources are rich in inclusions from the Early Cretaceous. All of them are located in Lebanon, which makes it the largest source of inclusion from that period.

== History ==
Aside from possible early reports of Phoenician usage, the oldest reports of Lebanese amber are from 19th-century accounts, these tended only to be incidental due to Lebanese amber's gemological quality in comparison to Baltic amber, and the local people were more interested in the associated lignite as a source of fuel.

== Properties ==
Lebanese amber can be found in many colors such as yellow, orange, dark red or iridescent jet black, and rarely in white, milky or cream. The variation of color tone is caused by the air contained in the amber. The density of Lebanese amber is 1.054 g/cm3. It tends to be fragile and easy to damage.

== Inclusions ==
Inclusions are quite common for Lebanese amber, which is rich in organisms of the Barremian epoch. Next to Jordanian amber, Lebanese amber is the oldest amber to have yielded significant invertebrate inclusions alongside the Wealden amber from the equivalently aged Wessex Formation of the UK, which is much less productive. Organisms preserved in Lebanese amber are dated back to the period prior to the angiosperm radiation, which was the period of massive extinction of old groups of arthropods, as well as the emergence of the new ones, some of which co-evolved with angiosperms. The organisms are preserved in good condition and shape. The diversity and number of co-inclusions help to draw conclusions about mutual relations and co-existence.

== Paleobiota ==
After Poinar & Milki (2001), Maksoud & Azar (2020) and subsequent studies.

=== Bacteria ===
Genus	Species	Notes	Images
Streptomyces	sp.		

=== Fungi ===
Genus	Species	Notes	Images
Chytridiales	indet.		
Mucorales	indet.		

=== Plants ===
Genus	Species	Notes	Images
Agathis	levantensis	An araucarian tree responsible for the production of amber.	

=== Hexapoda ===
Genus	Species	Notes	Images
Alphaspilus	A. heliades	The earliest known Megaspilid Hymenopteran.	
Archaeatropos		An archaeatropid psocodean.	
Arthropleona	indet.	A springtail.	
Asphaeropsocites		A sphaeropsocid psocodean.	
Aphelopus		A dryinid wasp.	
Archiaustroconops		A ceratopogonid fly.	
Archiculicoides		A ceratopogonid fly.	
Archisciada		A sciadocerid fly.	
Atelestites		An empidid fly.	
Austroconops		A ceratopogonid fly.	
Avenaphora		A dolichopodid fly.	
Banoberotha		A beaded lacewing.	
Bcharreglaris		An archaeatropid psocodean.	
Bernaea		A whitefly.	
Blattodea	indet.	A cockroach.	
Chomeromyia		A fly.	
Conovirilus		A leptophlebiid mayfly.	
Corethrella		A corethrellid biting midge.	
Cretaceomachilis		A meinertellid bristletail.	
Cretacetrocta		A pachytroctid psocodean.	
Cretapsychoda		A psychodid fly.	
Enicocephalinus		An enicocephalid.	
Exitelothrips		A scudderothripid thrips.	
Fossileptoconops		A ceratopogonid fly.	
Glaesoconis		A dustywing.	
Heidea		A whitefly.	
Incurvariites		A incurvariid moth.	
Jankotejacoccus		A jankotejacoccid scale insect.	
Jezzinothrips		A jezzinothripid thrips.	
Lebambromyia		A phorid fly.	
Lebanaphis		A tajmyraphidid hemipteran.	
Lebania		A tipulid crane fly.	
Lebanoconops		A ceratopogonid fly.	
Lebanoculicoides		A ceratopogonid fly.	
Leptoconops		A ceratopogonid fly.	
Libaneuphoris		A libanophorid pscocodean.	
Libanobythus		A scolobythid hemipteran.	
Libanochlites		A non-biting midge.	
Libanoculex		A chaoborid fly, previously interpreted as a mosquito.	
Libanoglaris		An archaeatropid psocodean.	
Libanophlebotomus		A psychodid fly.	
Libanomphientomum		A electrentomoid psocodean.	
Libanopsychoda		A psychodid fly.	
Libanopsyllipsocus		A psyllipsocid psocodean.	
Libanorhinus		A nemonychid weevil.	
Libanosemidalis		A dustywing.	
Lonchopterites		A lonchopterid fly.	
Lonchopteromorpha		A lonchopterid fly.	
Rhadinolabis		An earwig.	
Setoglaris		An archaeatropid psocodean.	
Lebanotermes		A termite.	
Megarostrum		A tajmyraphidid hemipteran.	
Mesobolbomyia		A rhagionid fly.	
Mundopoides		A cixiid.	
Neocomothrips		A neocomothripid thrips.	
Paleochrysopilus		A rhagionid fly.	
Paleopsychoda		A psychodid fly.	
Palaeosiamoglaris		A prionoglarid psocodean.	
Parasabatinca		A micropterigid moth.	
Paraberotha		A beaded lacewing.	
Paramesopsocus		A electrentomid psocodean.	
Phaetempis		An empidid fly.	
Phlebotomites		A phlebotomid fly.	
Progonothrips		A rhetinothripid thrips.	
Protoculicoides		A ceratopogonid fly.	
Protopsychoda		A psychodid fly.	
Psocodea	sp. 1	A juvenile psocodean.	
Raptorapax		A rhachiberotid neuropteran.	
Rhetinothrips		A rhetinothripid thrip.	
Scaphothrips		A scaphothripid thrips.	
Scudderothrips		A scudderothripid thrips.	
Sphaeropsocites		A sphaeropsocid psocodean.	
Trichinites		An empidid fly.	
Yuripopovina		A yuripopovinid hemipteran.	
Xenosycorax	X. bouareji	A psychodidid fly	

=== Arachnida ===
Genus	Species	Notes	Images
Acari	indet.	Various free-living mites.	
Anystidae	sp.	An anystid mite.	
Archaeobuthus		An archaeobuthid scorpion.	
Erythraeoidea	indet.	A erythraeid mite.	
Erythraeoidea	indet.	Leptus sp.?	
Lebansegestria		A segestriid spider.	
Lebanoecobius		A oecobiid spider.	
Linyphiidae	sp.	A linyphiid spider.	
Microsegestria		A segestriid spider.	
Neoliodes		A neoliodid mite.	
Oonopidae	sp.	An oonopid spider.	
Palaeomicromenneus		A deinopid spider.	
Plumorsolus		A plumorsolid spider.	
Pseudoscorpiones	indet.	A pseudoscorpion.	
Zamilia		A oecobiid spider.	

=== Other invertebrates ===
Genus	Species	Notes	Images
Chilopoda indet.			
Cretaciomermis		A nematode.	
Electroxenus		A polyxenid millipede.	
Heleidomermis		A mermithid nematode.	
Libanoxenus		A polyxenid millipede.	
Pupilloidea indet.		A possible pupillid snail.	

=== Vertebrates ===
Vertebrates of the Lebanese Amber
Genus	Species	Notes	Images
Aves	indeterminate	A single feather and the only known bird remains of the biota.	
Baabdasaurus	B. xenurus	Autarchoglossan lizard.	
