= Abrocomophaga =

Scientific classification
- Kingdom: Animalia
- Phylum: Arthropoda
- Class: Insecta
- Order: Psocodea
- Suborder: Troctomorpha
- Infraorder: Phthiraptera
- Parvorder: Amblycera
- Family: Gyropidae
- Genus: Abrocomophaga; Emerson & Price, 1976

Type species
- Abrocomophaga chilensis Emerson & Price, 1976

Species
- A. chilensis; A. emmonsae; A. hellenthali

Genus of lice

Abrocomophaga is a genus of lice. The type species Abrocomophaga chilensis was scientifically described in 1976, and was originally placed in its own family Abrocomophagidae. However, in 2000, two additional species were described, A. emmonsae and A. hellenthali, and the genus Abrocomophaga was reassigned to the family Gyropidae.

The original paratypes are located in the Chilean city and commune Tiltil, and it was first collected on 2 November 1974.
