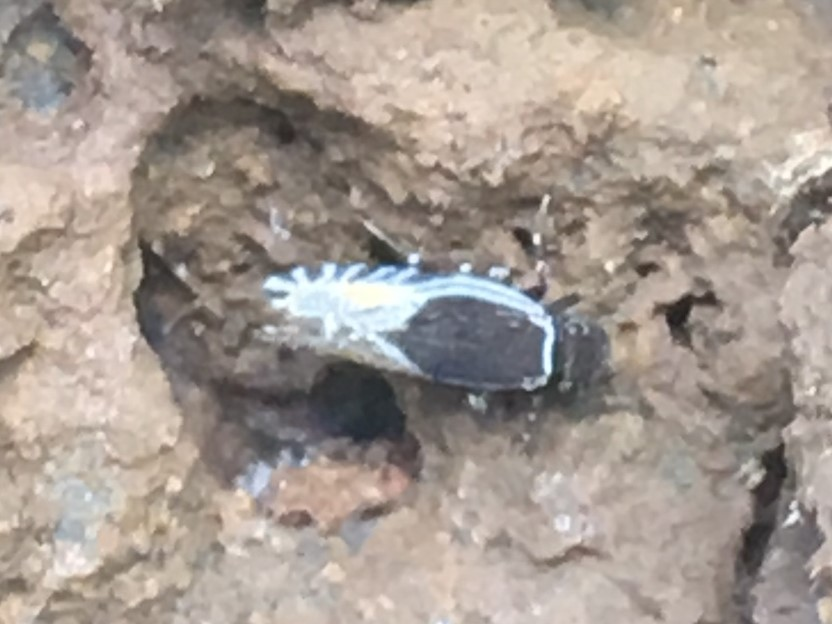
- Stigmatopathus sp.

Scientific classification
- Kingdom: Animalia
- Phylum: Arthropoda
- Clade: Pancrustacea
- Class: Insecta
- Order: Psocodea
- Suborder: Troctomorpha
- Infraorder: Amphientometae
- Family: Amphientomidae

Genera
- Subfamily Tineomorphinae: Cymatopsocus; Tineomorpha; Subfamily Amphientominae: Amphientomum; Compressionis; Diamphipsocus; Hemiseopsis; Lithoseopsis; Marcenendius; Neoseopsis; Nephax; Paramphientomum; Proamphientomum; Pseudoseopsis; Seopsis; Seopsocus; Stigmatopathus; Stimulopalpus; Syllysis; Yinia; Incertae sedis: Ancylopsocus

= Amphientomidae =

Family of booklice

Amphientomidae is a family of Psocodea (formerly Psocoptera) belonging to the suborder Troctomorpha. The presence of scales on their wings gives them a superficial resemblance to the unrelated family Lepidopsocidae (within Trogiomorpha), and both families can pass for microlepidoptera to the untrained eye. The family comprises 100 species arranged in twenty genera.
