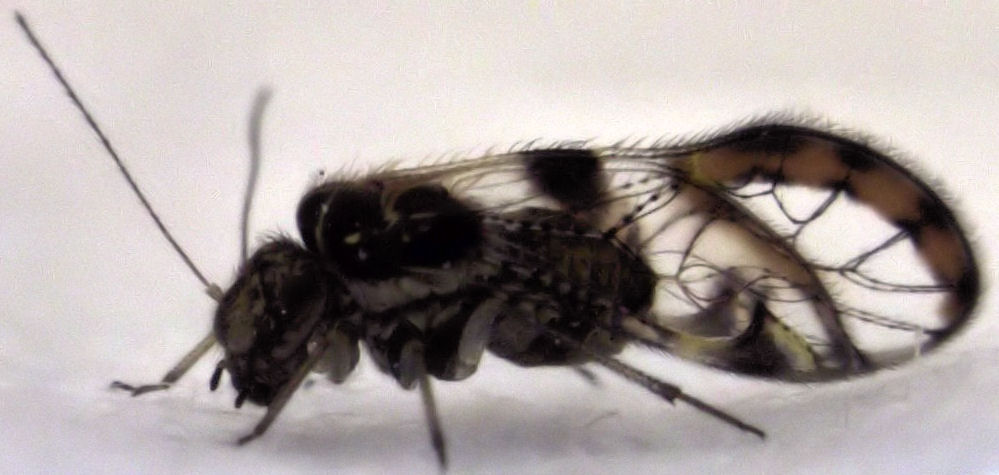
- Abelopsocus basipunctatus

Scientific classification
- Kingdom: Animalia
- Phylum: Arthropoda
- Clade: Pancrustacea
- Class: Insecta
- Clade: Eumetabola
- Order: Psocodea
- Suborder: Psocomorpha; Roesler, 1944

Infraorders
- Archipsocetae; Caeciliusetae; Epipsocetae; Homilopsocidea; Philotarsetae; Psocetae

= Psocomorpha =

Psocomorpha Temporal range: Cenomanian–Recent

Suborder of booklice

Psocomorpha is a suborder of barklice in the order Psocodea (formerly Psocoptera). There are more than 20 families and 5,300 described species in Psocomorpha.

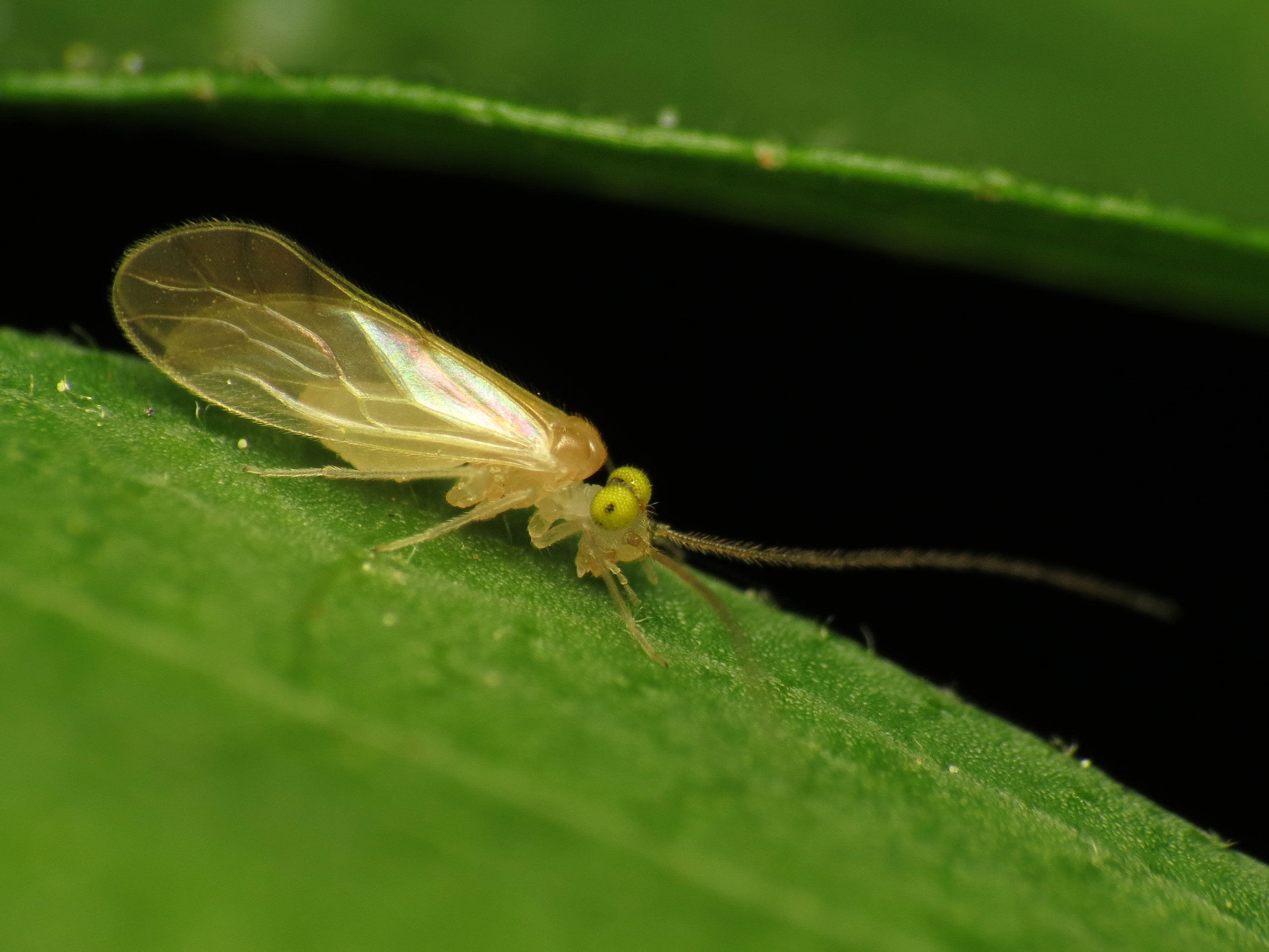
Xanthocaecilius sommermanae

== Phylogeny ==
The below cladogram of Psocodea shows the position of Psocomorpha:

- Psocodea
  - - Troctomorpha
      - - - Phthiraptera
            - - Philopteridae
              - - - Anoplura
                  - Rhynchophthirina
                - Trichodectidae
            - Amblycera
          - Liposcelididae
        - - Pachytroctidae
          - Sphaeropsocidae
      - Amphientometae
    - Psocomorpha
      - - - Homilopsocidea
          - Caeciliusetae
        - - - Psocetae
            - Epipsocetae
          - Philotarsetae
      - Archipsocetae
  - Trogiomorpha
    - - Atropetae
      - Psyllipsocetae
    - Prionoglaridetae (paraphyletic)

== Fossil record ==
The oldest fossil record of the suborder is Burmesopsocus lienhardi from the mid-Cretaceous (early Cenomanian) Burmese amber, which is not assigned to any family.

== Classification ==
Psocomorpha contains 6 infraorders and 26 families:

- Archipsocetae
  - Archipsocidae Pearman, 1936 (ancient barklice)
- Caeciliusetae
  - Amphipsocidae Pearman, 1936 (hairy-winged barklice)
  - Asiopsocidae Mockford & Garcia Aldrete, 1976
  - Caeciliusidae Mockford, 2000 (lizard barklice)
  - Dasydemellidae Mockford, 1978 (shaggy psocids)
  - Paracaeciliidae Mockford, 1989
  - Stenopsocidae Pearman, 1936 (narrow barklice)
- Epipsocetae
  - Cladiopsocidae Smithers, 1972
  - Dolabellopsocidae Eertmoed, 1973
  - Epipsocidae Pearman, 1936 (elliptical barklice)
  - Ptiloneuridae Roesler, 1940
  - Spurostigmatidae Eertmoed, 1973
- Homilopsocidea
  - Ectopsocidae Roesler, 1944 (outer barklice)
  - Elipsocidae Pearman, 1936 (damp barklice)
  - Lachesillidae Pearman, 1936 (fateful barklice)
  - Lesneiidae Schmidt & New, 2004
  - Mesopsocidae Pearman, 1936 (middle barklice)
  - Peripsocidae Roesler, 1944 (stout barklice)
  - Sabulopsocidae Schmidt & New, 2004
- Philotarsetae
  - Philotarsidae Pearman, 1936 (loving barklice)
  - Pseudocaeciliidae Pearman, 1936 (false lizard barklice)
  - Trichopsocidae Pearman, 1936 (lash-faced psocids)
- Psocetae
  - Hemipsocidae Pearman, 1936 (leaf litter barklice)
  - Myopsocidae Pearman, 1936 (mouse-like barklice)
  - Psilopsocidae Roesler, 1944
  - Psocidae Hagen, 1865 (common barklice)
