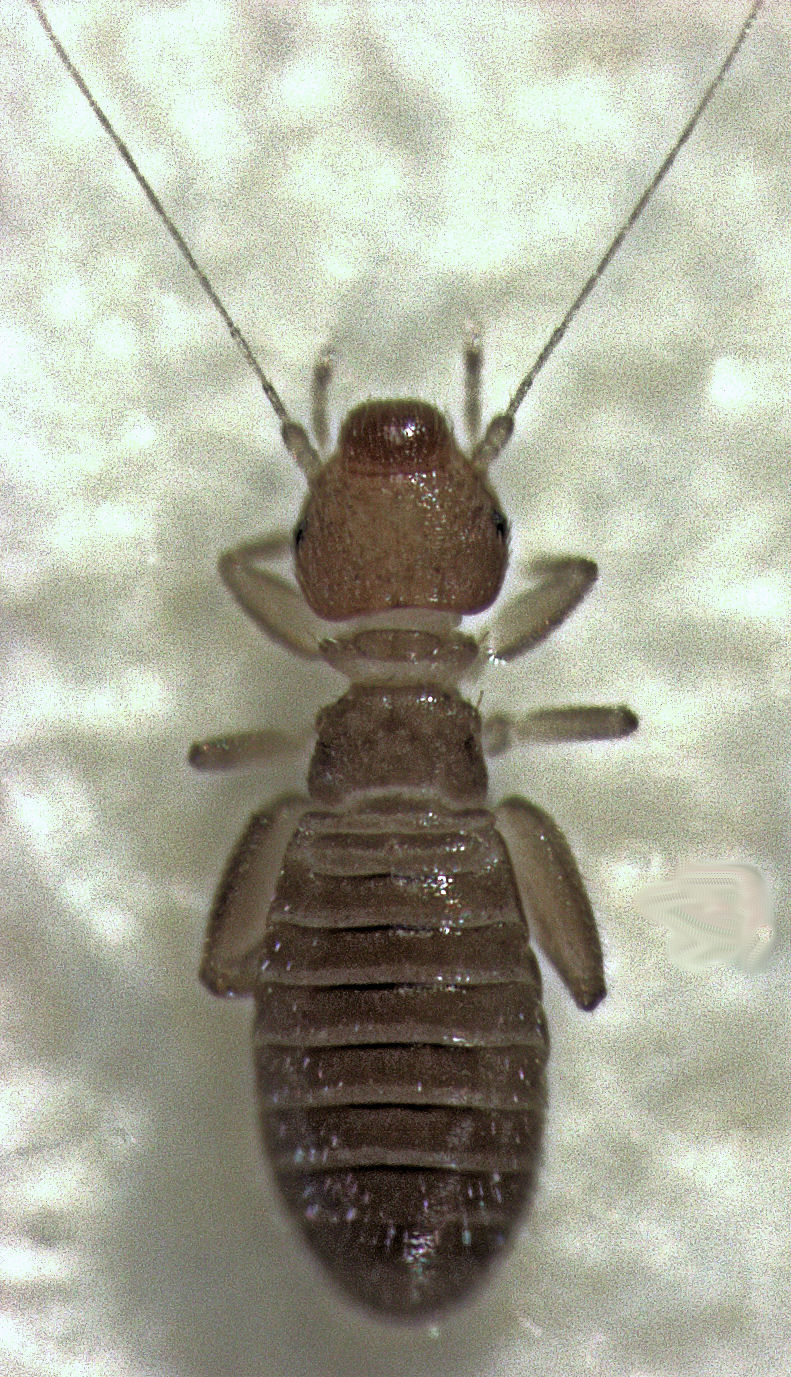
- Liposcelis
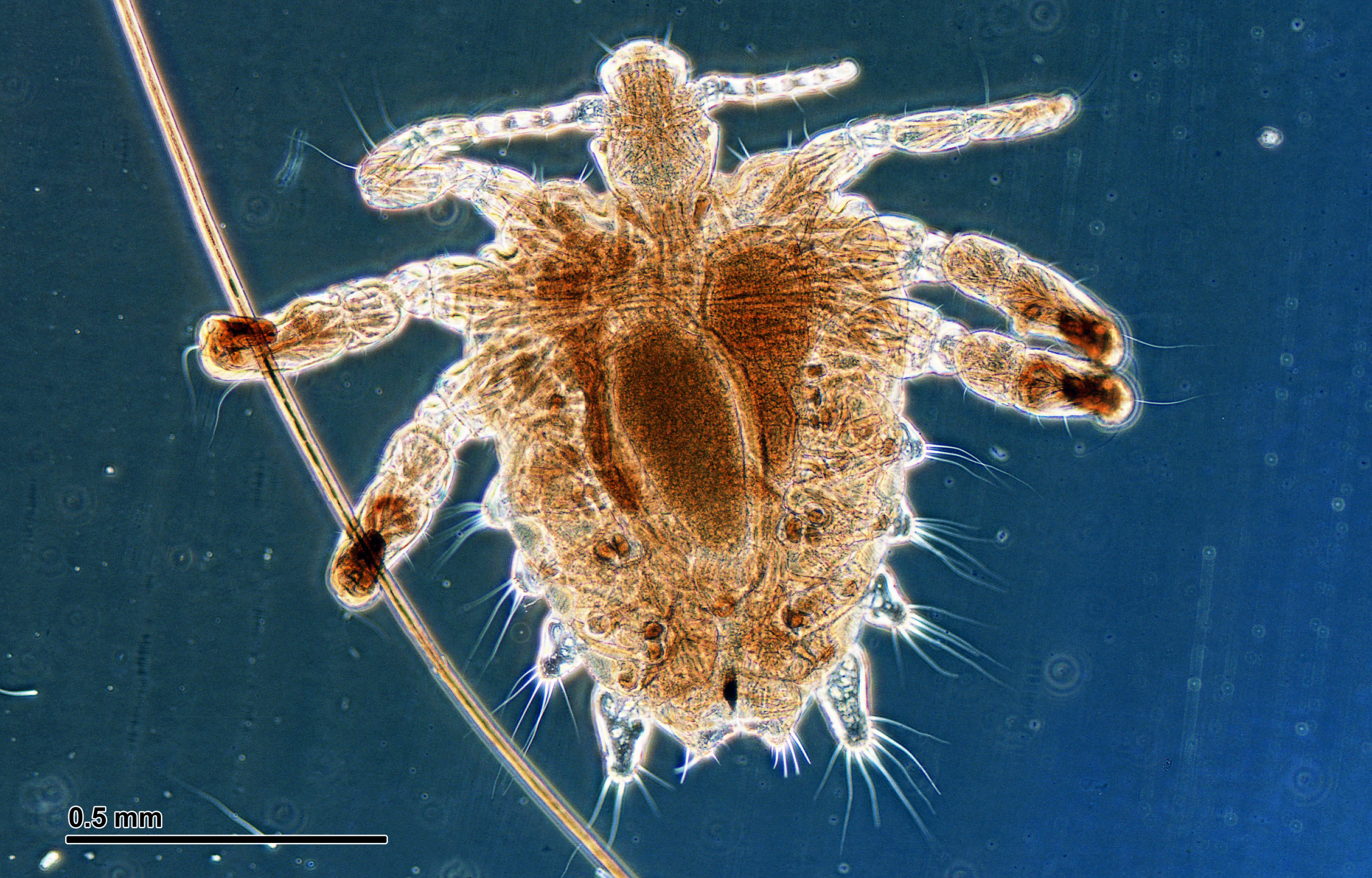
- Crab louse

Scientific classification
- Domain: Eukaryota
- Kingdom: Animalia
- Phylum: Arthropoda
- Class: Insecta
- Order: Psocodea
- Suborder: Troctomorpha
- Infraorder: Nanopsocetae; Pearman, 1936

Clades
- Phthiraptera (lice); Liposcelididae; Pachytroctidae; Sphaeropsocidae

= Nanopsocetae =

Nanopsocetae Temporal range: Cretaceous–Recent

Infraorder of booklice

Nanopsocetae is one of two major divisions of Troctomorpha in the order Psocodea (formerly Psocoptera), alongside Amphientometae. There are more than 20 families and 5,200 described species in Nanopsocetae.

== Taxonomy ==
The clade contains four major groups, Phthiraptera (lice), Liposcelididae, Pachytroctidae and Sphaeropsocidae.

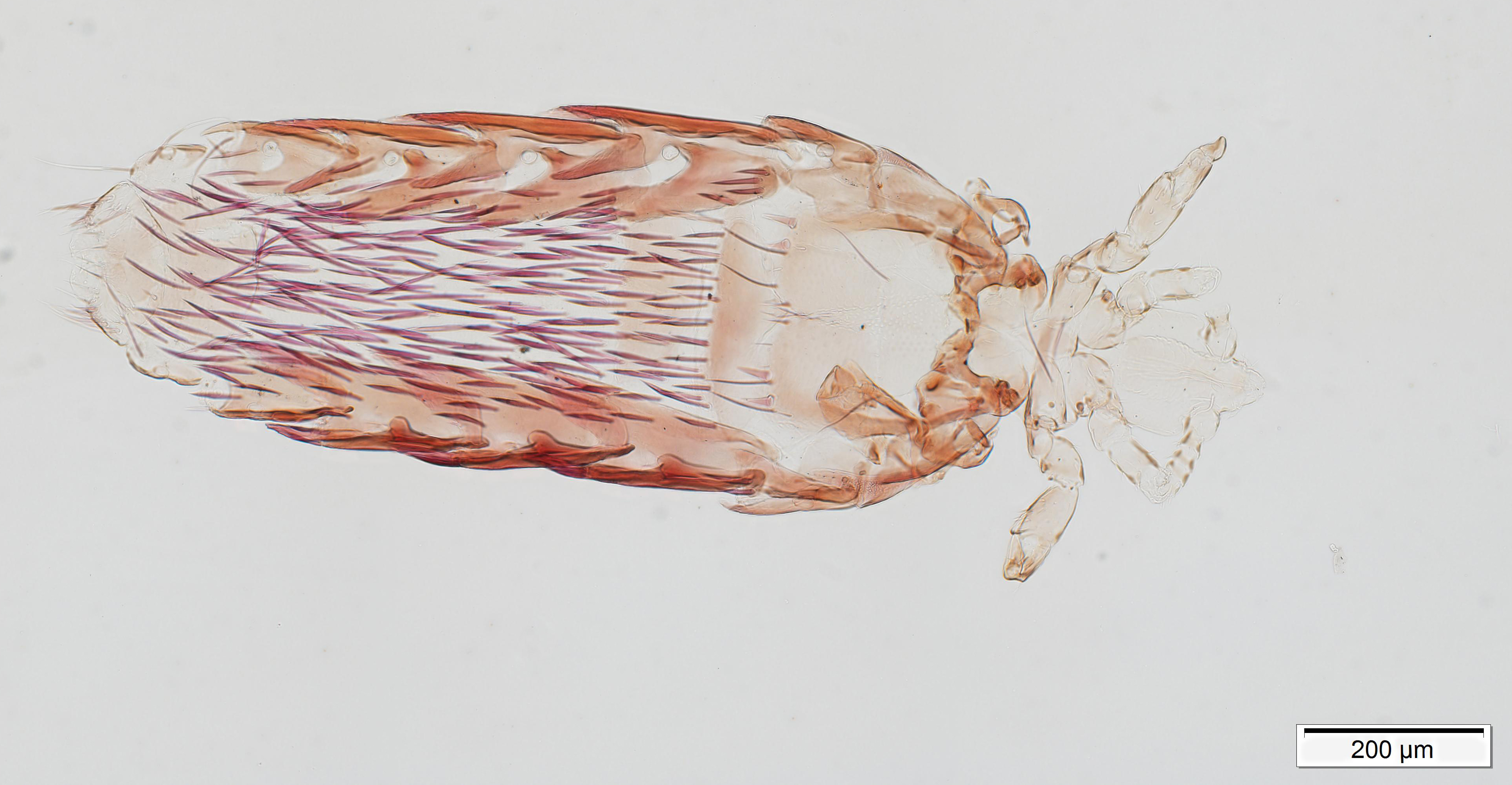
Schizophthirus pleurophaeus
