= Nanopsocus oceanicus =

Scientific classification
- Domain: Eukaryota
- Kingdom: Animalia
- Phylum: Arthropoda
- Class: Insecta
- Order: Psocodea
- Family: Pachytroctidae
- Genus: Nanopsocus
- Species: N. oceanicus

Binomial name
- Nanopsocus oceanicus Pearman, 1928

Species of booklouse

Nanopsocus oceanicus is a species of thick barklouse in the family Pachytroctidae. It is found in Africa, Australia, the Caribbean, Europe, Northern Asia (excluding China), Central America, North America, South America, and Southern Asia.
