= Psilopsocus mimulus =

Scientific classification
- Domain: Eukaryota
- Kingdom: Animalia
- Phylum: Arthropoda
- Class: Insecta
- Order: Psocodea
- Family: Psilopsocidae
- Genus: Psilopsocus
- Species: P. mimulus

Binomial name
- Psilopsocus mimulus Smithers, 1963

Wood-boring psocopteran

Psilopsocus mimulus is a species of bark louse in the family Psilopsocidae. Found in Australia, it is the first known member of its order to bore into wood.

== Description and life cycle ==
Like other Psocodea, P. mimulus has a life cycle consisting of egg, nymph and adult. Unlike other Psocodea, in which nymphs resemble smaller versions of adults, nymphs of P. mimulus are very different from the adults. This reflects their adaptation to a wood-boring lifestyle.

First instar nymphs are mostly colourless except for the last two tergites, which are brown, heavily sclerotised and covered in long setae with slightly expanded tips. They have 8-segmented antennae that each have a broad basal segment.

Later instars are different again. The head is almost as wide as the widest part of the abdomen. It bears antennae in which the first flagellar segment is slightly curved. There are wings buds held close to the sides of the thorax and abdomen. The abdomen is mostly weakly sclerotised except for the distal third, which is heavily sclerotised, black, almost cylindrical and appears unsegmented from above. The end of the abdomen is densely covered in short setae, most of which have the apex divided into several divergent points. This unique abdominal end resembles that of a bostrichid beetle.

The adult is 4.0-4.5 mm long with ocelli on the head, antennae longer than the body, and developed wings. The hind legs are unusually long compared to other legs.

Adults can live for 6-67 days under laboratory conditions, usually less than 40 days. Adult females start laying eggs as soon as 4 days after the final nymphal moult and they lay eggs singly on bark. Eggs are covered in crusts of fecal material similar in colour to bark, camouflaging them. It takes 20-26 days for the eggs to hatch, starting the life cycle again.

== Wood-boring ==
Psilopsocus mimulus has been known since 1963, but it was not until 1993 that its wood-boring habit was discovered. Nymphs of this species live in tunnels up to 6 cm long that run from the ends through the centres of pine twigs. They face away from the entrances of their tunnels and plug them using their sclerotised abdomens (phragmosis). Laboratory tests have confirmed that P. mimulus create their own tunnels in wood, as opposed to reusing tunnels left by other insects. If presented with a twig lacking a tunnel, a nymph bores into the end by eating through the central, softer wood. The consumed wood passes through the gut and is excreted as brown fecal pellets. To defecate, the nymph must first move backwards until the end of its abdomen protrudes from the tunnel. One actively burrowing nymph was observed producing fecal pellets every 20 minutes.

Nymphs feeding within the tunnels produce black fecal pellets "consisting mainly of digested or partially digested fungal hyphae, fungal spores, woody and resinous material with, in a few cases, some unicellular green algae". Nymphs may leave the tunnel to browse on fungus on bark, but this seems to be a rare occurrence.

Leaving the tunnel also occurs when a nymph moults. After moulting, a nymph may return to its original tunnel or move into a tunnel made by another.

== Associated organisms ==
An unknown species of chalcidoid wasp parasitises P. mimulus nymphs and pupates within its tunnels.

A white-coloured fungus was observed on dead nymphs, but it is unknown if this is parasitic or simply a saprophyte on nymphs that died of other causes.

The latridiid beetle Corticaria japonica lives in empty tunnels of P. mimulus from mid-November to January. Sometimes several beetles occur in a tunnel at once.
