= Bryopsocidae =

Scientific classification
- Kingdom: Animalia
- Phylum: Arthropoda
- Class: Insecta
- Order: Psocoptera
- Suborder: Psocomorpha
- Infraorder: Homilopsocidea
- Family: Bryopsocidae

Genera
- Bryopsocus

Family of booklice

Bryopsocidae a former family of Psocodea (formerly Psocoptera) (book lice) belonging to the suborder Psocomorpha. This family is now considered to be a junior synonym of the subfamily Zelandopsocinae within the family Pseudocaeciliidae.

The family includes 2 species from New Zealand.

== Sources ==
- Lienhard, C. & Smithers, C. N. 2002. Psocoptera (Insecta): World Catalogue and Bibliography. Instrumenta Biodiversitatis, vol. 5. Muséum d'histoire naturelle, Genève.
