= Compsocus =

Scientific classification
- Domain: Eukaryota
- Kingdom: Animalia
- Phylum: Arthropoda
- Class: Insecta
- Order: Psocodea
- Family: Compsocidae
- Genus: Compsocus; Banks, 1930
- Species: C. elegans

Binomial name
- Compsocus elegans Banks, 1930

Genus of booklice

Compsocus is a genus within the Psocoptera order of insects, commonly known as booklice or barklice. The only known species in this genus, Compsocus elegans, is found in Mexico and Central America. It was first identified by Nathan Banks in 1930.
