= Nanopsocus =

Scientific classification
- Domain: Eukaryota
- Kingdom: Animalia
- Phylum: Arthropoda
- Class: Insecta
- Order: Psocodea
- Family: Pachytroctidae
- Genus: Nanopsocus; Pearman, 1928

Genus of booklice

Nanopsocus is a genus of thick barklice in the family Pachytroctidae. There are about five described species in Nanopsocus.

== Species ==
These five species belong to the genus Nanopsocus:

- Nanopsocus falsus Badonnel, 1977
- Nanopsocus longicornis Badonnel, 1976
- Nanopsocus oceanicus Pearman, 1928
- Nanopsocus pictus Baz, 1990
- Nanopsocus trifasciatus (Badonnel, 1969)
