= Protroctopsocidae =

Scientific classification
- Domain: Eukaryota
- Kingdom: Animalia
- Phylum: Arthropoda
- Class: Insecta
- Order: Psocodea
- Suborder: Troctomorpha
- Infraorder: Amphientometae
- Superfamily: Electrentomoidea
- Family: Protroctopsocidae; Smithers, 1972

Family of booklice

Protroctopsocidae is a family of psocids in the order Psocodea. There are at least four genera and about five described species in Protroctopsocidae.

== Genera ==
These four genera belong to the family Protroctopsocidae:

- Chelyopsocus Lienhard, 1980
- Philedaphia Lienhard, 1995
- Protroctopsocus Mockford, 1967
- Reticulopsocus Lienhard, 2005
