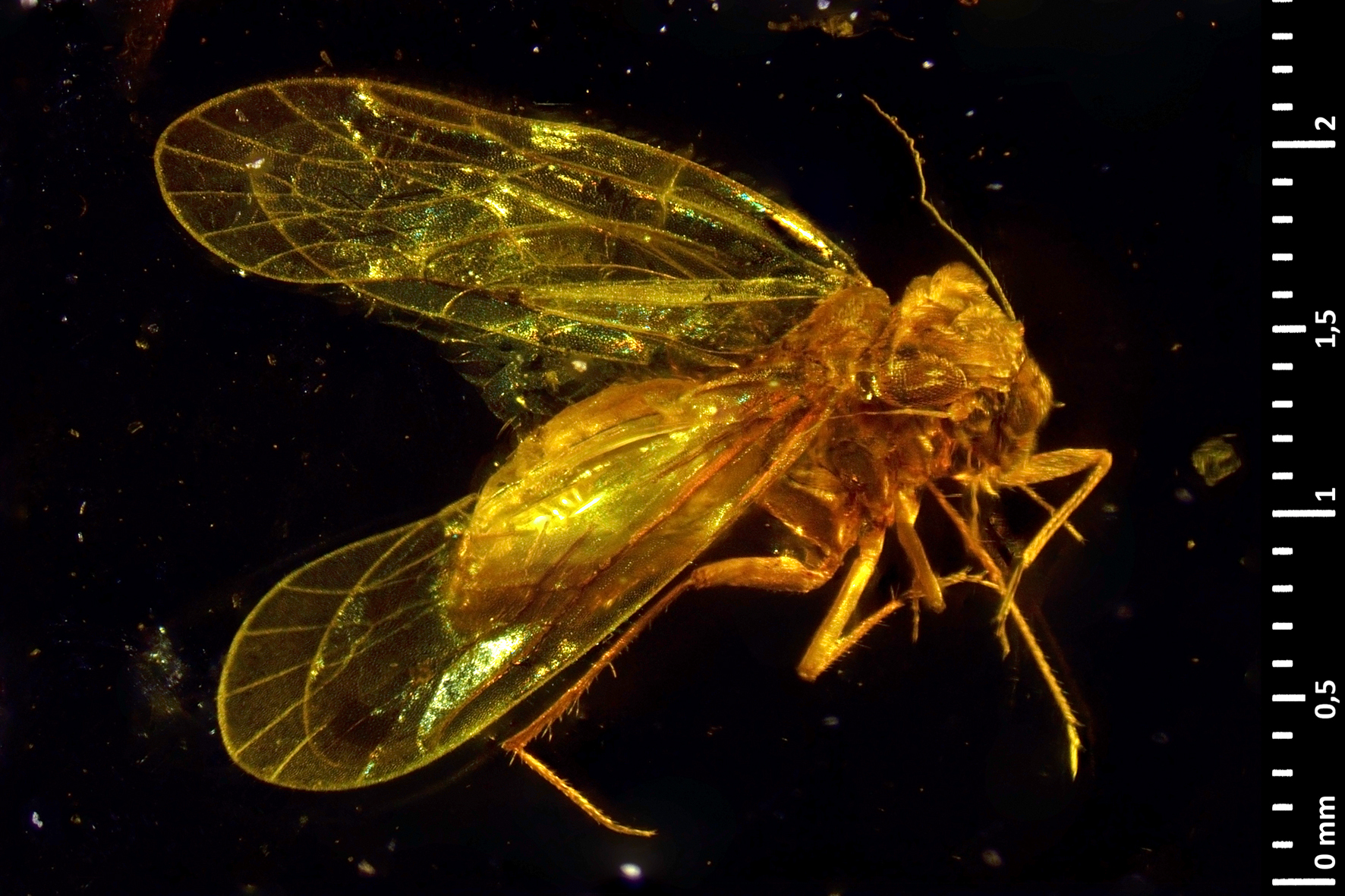
- Burmacompsocus perreaui

Scientific classification
- Kingdom: Animalia
- Phylum: Arthropoda
- Clade: Pancrustacea
- Class: Insecta
- Order: Psocodea
- Suborder: Troctomorpha
- Infraorder: Amphientometae
- Family: Compsocidae

Genera
- Compsocus; Electrentomopsis; †Burmacompsocus; †Paraelectrentomopsis

= Compsocidae =

Compsocidae Temporal range: Albian–Present

Family of booklice

Compsocidae is a family of Psocodea (formerly Psocoptera) belonging to the suborder Troctomorpha. The family comprises two extant species in two genera, both found in Mesoamerica. Compsocus elegans is found in Mexico and Central America, while Electrentomopsis variegata is found in Mexico. The antennae of each species have 13 or 14 segments. Two extinct genera, Burmacompsocus and Paraelectrentomopsis are known from the Cenomanian aged Burmese amber of Myanmar and Albian aged Spanish amber.

== Taxonomy ==
- Compsocus Banks, N., 1930
  - Compsocus elegans Banks, N., 1930
- Electrentomopsis Mockford, 1967
  - Electrentomopsis variegata Mockford, 1967
- †Burmacompsocus Nel & Waller, 2007
  - Burmacompsocus banksi (Cockerell, 1916) (originally Psyllipsocus) Burmese amber, Myanmar, mid Cretaceous (Albian-Cenomanian)
  - Burmacompsocus coniugans Sroka & Nel, 2017 Burmese amber
  - Burmacompsocus perreaui Nel & Waller, 2007 Burmese amber
  - Burmacompsocus pouilloni Ngô-Muller et al. 2020 Burmese amber
  - Burmacompsocus ojancano Álvarez-Parra et al. 2023 Spanish amber, Albian
- †Paraelectrentomopsis Azar, Hakim & Huang, 2016 Burmese amber
  - Paraelectrentomopsis chenyangcaii Azar, Hakim & Huang, 2016

== Sources ==
- Lienhard, C. & Smithers, C. N. 2002. Psocoptera (Insecta): World Catalogue and Bibliography. Instrumenta Biodiversitatis, vol. 5. Muséum d'histoire naturelle, Genève.
