= Troctopsocidae =

Scientific classification
- Kingdom: Animalia
- Phylum: Arthropoda
- Clade: Pancrustacea
- Class: Insecta
- Order: Psocodea
- Suborder: Troctomorpha
- Infraorder: Amphientometae
- Family: Troctopsocidae

Genera
- Coleotroctellus; Selenopsocus; Thaipsocus; Troctopsocoides; Troctopsocopsis; Troctopsoculus; Troctopsocus

Family of booklice

Troctopsocidae is a family of Psocodea (formerly Psocoptera) belonging to the suborder Troctomorpha. The family consists of seven genera.

== Sources ==
- Lienhard, C. & Smithers, C. N. 2002. "Psocoptera (Insecta)": World Catalogue and Bibliography. Instrumenta Biodiversitatis, vol. 5. Muséum d'histoire naturelle, Geneva, Switzerland.
