= Archaeatropidae =

Archaeatropidae Temporal range: Barremian–Turonian

Scientific classification
- Domain: Eukaryota
- Kingdom: Animalia
- Phylum: Arthropoda
- Class: Insecta
- Order: Psocodea
- Suborder: Trogiomorpha
- Family: †Archaeatropidae; Baz and Ortuño 2000

Genera
- See text

Extinct family of booklice

Archaeatropidae is an extinct family of Psocoptera in the suborder Trogiomorpha.

== Genera ==
- †Archaeatropos Baz and Ortuño 2000
  - †Archaeatropos alavensis Baz and Ortuño 2000 Spanish amber, Albian
  - †Archaeatropos perantiqua (Cockerell 1919) Burmese amber, Myanmar, Cenomanian
  - †Archaeatropos randatae (Azar and Nel 2004) Lebanese amber, Barremian
- †Bcharreglaris Azar and Nel 2004
  - †Bcharreglaris amooni Kaddumi 2007 Jordanian amber, Albian
  - †Bcharreglaris amunobi Azar and Nel 2004 Lebanese amber, Barremian
  - †Bcharreglaris haddadini Kaddumi 2007 Jordanian amber, Albian
- †Libanoglaris Azar et al. 2003 Lebanese amber, Barremian
  - †Libanoglaris chehabi Azar and Nel 2004
  - †Libanoglaris mouawadi Azar et al. 2003
- †Proprionoglaris Perrichot et al. 2003
  - †Proprionoglaris axioperierga Azar et al. 2014 Vendée amber, France, Turonian
  - †Proprionoglaris guyoti Perrichot et al. 2003 Charentese amber, France, Cenomanian
- †Prospeleketor Perrichot et al. 2003
  - †Prospeleketor albianensis Perrichot et al. 2003 Charentese amber, France, Cenomanian
- †Setoglaris Azar and Nel 2004
  - †Setoglaris reemae Azar and Nel 2004 Lebanese amber, Barremian
