= Boopiidae =

Scientific classification
- Domain: Eukaryota
- Kingdom: Animalia
- Phylum: Arthropoda
- Class: Insecta
- Order: Psocodea
- Suborder: Troctomorpha
- Infraorder: Nanopsocetae
- Family: Boopiidae; Mjoberg, 1910

Family of booklice

Boopiidae is a family of lice in the order Psocodea. There are about 8 genera and more than 50 described species in Boopiidae.

== Genera ==
These eight genera belong to the family Boopiidae:

- Boopia Piaget, 1880
- Heterodoxus Le Souef & Bullen, 1902
- Latumcephalum Le Souef, 1902
- Macropophila Mjoberg, 1919
- Paraboopia Werneck & Thompson, 1940
- Paraheterodoxus Harrison & Johnston, 1916
- Phacogalia Mjoberg, 1919
- Therodoxus Clay, 1971
