= Trimenoponidae =

Scientific classification
- Kingdom: Animalia
- Phylum: Arthropoda
- Clade: Pancrustacea
- Class: Insecta
- Order: Psocodea
- Suborder: Troctomorpha
- Infraorder: Phthiraptera
- Parvorder: Amblycera
- Family: Trimenoponidae

Family of booklice

Trimenoponidae is a family of lice in the order Psocodea. There are about 6 genera and 18 described species in Trimenoponidae.

== Genera ==
These six genera belong to the family Trimenoponidae:

- Chinchillophaga Emerson, 1964
- Cummingsia Ferris, 1922
- Harrisonia Ferris, 1922
- Hoplomyophilus Mendez, 1967
- Philandesia Kellogg & Nakayama, 1914
- Trimenopon Cummings, 1913
