= Manicapsocidae =

Manicapsocidae Temporal range: Albian–Recent

Scientific classification
- Kingdom: Animalia
- Phylum: Arthropoda
- Clade: Pancrustacea
- Class: Insecta
- Order: Psocodea
- Suborder: Troctomorpha
- Infraorder: Amphientometae
- Family: Manicapsocidae; Mockford, 1967

Genera
- See text

Family of booklice

Manicapsocidae is a family of Psocodea (formerly Psocoptera). It contains 8 extant species in 4 genera, with most of the species being found in the Neotropics and one species in the Afrotropics. The extinct family Electrentomidae has been suggested as a synonym of this family, though this has been considered premature by other scholars in the absence of cladistic analysis. Confirmed fossil species of the family are nearly as numerous as living ones, extending back to the mid-Cretaceous.

== Taxonomy ==
- Manicapsocus Smithers, 1966
  - M. alettae Smithers, 1966 Africa, Zimbabwe
- Epitroctes Mockford, 1967 Neotropics
  - E. calypso Mockford, 1996
  - E. pluvialis Mockford, 1996
  - E. sanguineus Mockford, 1996
  - E. sanvito Mockford, 1996
  - E.. tuxtlarum Mockford, 1967
- Nothoentomum Badonnel, 1967 Neotropics
  - N. palpale Badonnel, 1967
- Phallopsocus Badonnel, 1967 Neotropics
  - P. carminatus Badonnel, 1967
- †Azarpsocus Maheu and Nel, 2019
  - †A. perreaui Maheu and Nel, 2019 Burmese amber, Myanmar, Cenomanian
  - †A. anjana Álvarez-Parra & Nel in Álvarez-Parra et al. 2023 Spanish amber, Albian
- †Eomanicapsocus Nel et al., 2005
  - †E. melaniae Nel et al., 2005 Oise amber, France, Ypresian
- †Eoprotroctopsocus Nel et al., 2005
  - †E. celinea Nel et al., 2005 Oise amber, France, Ypresian
- † Manicapsocidus Baz & Ortuño, 2001
  - †M. enigmaticus Baz and Ortuño, 2001 Álava amber, Escucha Formation, Spain, Albian
- †Palaeomanicapsocus Azar et al., 2016 Burmese amber, Myanmar, Cenomanian
  - †P. margoae Azar et al., 2016
  - †P. fouadi Azar et al., 2016
- †Paramanicapsocus Hakim, Azar and Huang, 2019
  - †P. longiantennatus Hakim et al., 2019 Burmese amber, Myanmar, Cenomanian
