= Gyropidae =

Scientific classification
- Kingdom: Animalia
- Phylum: Arthropoda
- Clade: Pancrustacea
- Class: Insecta
- Order: Psocodea
- Suborder: Troctomorpha
- Infraorder: Phthiraptera
- Parvorder: Amblycera
- Family: Gyropidae; Kellogg, 1896

Family of booklice

Gyropidae is a family of lice in the order Psocodea. There are about 9 genera and more than 90 described species in Gyropidae.

== Genera ==
These nine genera belong to the family Gyropidae:

- Abrocomophaga Emerson & Price, 1976
- Aotiella Eichler, 1949
- Gliricola Mjoberg, 1910
- Gyropus Nitzsch, 1818
- Macrogyropus Ewing, 1924
- Monothoracius Werneck, 1934
- Phtheiropoios Eichler, 1940
- Pitrufquenia Marelli, 1932
- Protogyropus Ewing, 1924
