= Ptiloneuridae =

Scientific classification
- Kingdom: Animalia
- Phylum: Arthropoda
- Clade: Pancrustacea
- Class: Insecta
- Order: Psocodea
- Suborder: Psocomorpha
- Infraorder: Epipsocetae
- Family: Ptiloneuridae

Family of booklice

Ptiloneuridae (literally "downy veins") is a family of Psocodea (formerly Psocoptera) belonging to the suborder Psocomorpha. Like the other members of the infraorder Epipsocetae, they have a labrum with two sclerotized ridges.

== Sources ==
- Lienhard, C. & Smithers, C. N. 2002. Psocoptera (Insecta): World Catalogue and Bibliography. Instrumenta Biodiversitatis, vol. 5. Muséum d'histoire naturelle, Genève.
