= Laemobothriidae =

Scientific classification
- Kingdom: Animalia
- Phylum: Arthropoda
- Clade: Pancrustacea
- Class: Insecta
- Order: Psocodea
- Suborder: Troctomorpha
- Infraorder: Phthiraptera
- Parvorder: Amblycera
- Family: Laemobothriidae

Genera
- Eulaemobothrion; Laemobothrion; Ornithopeplechthos

Family of lice

The Laemobothriidae are a family of a larger group Amblycera of the chewing lice. Most commonly they are ectoparasites of birds. The genera are sometimes all united in Laemobothrion.
