= Empheriidae =

Empheriidae Temporal range: Albian–Eocene

Scientific classification
- Kingdom: Animalia
- Phylum: Arthropoda
- Class: Insecta
- Order: Psocodea
- Suborder: Trogiomorpha
- Family: †Empheriidae; Kolbe 1884

Genera
- See text

Extinct family of booklice

Empheriidae is an extinct family of Psocoptera in the suborder Trogiomorpha.

== Genera ==
- †Burmempheria Li et al. 2020 Burmese amber, Myanmar, Cenomanian
- †Empheria Hagen 1856 Baltic amber, Eocene
- †Empheropsocus Baz and Ortuño 2001 Spanish amber, Albian
- †Eoempheria Nel et al. 2005 Oise amber, France, Ypresian
- †Jerseyempheria Azar et al. 2010 New Jersey amber, Turonian
- †Preempheria Baz and Ortuño 2001 Spanish amber, Albian
- †Trichempheria Enderlein 1911 Baltic amber, Rovno amber, Eocene
