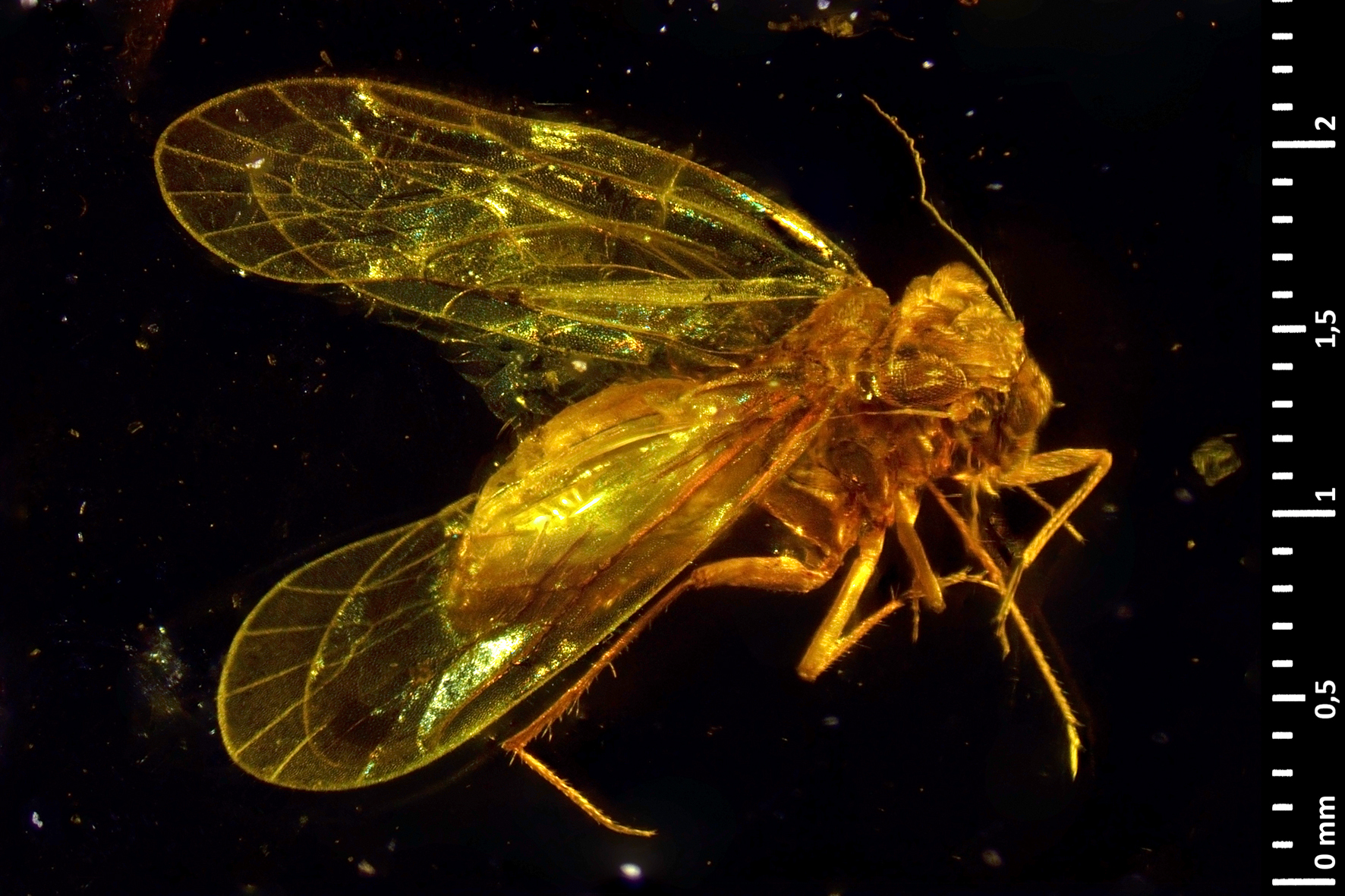
- Burmacompsocus perreaui (Compsocidae)
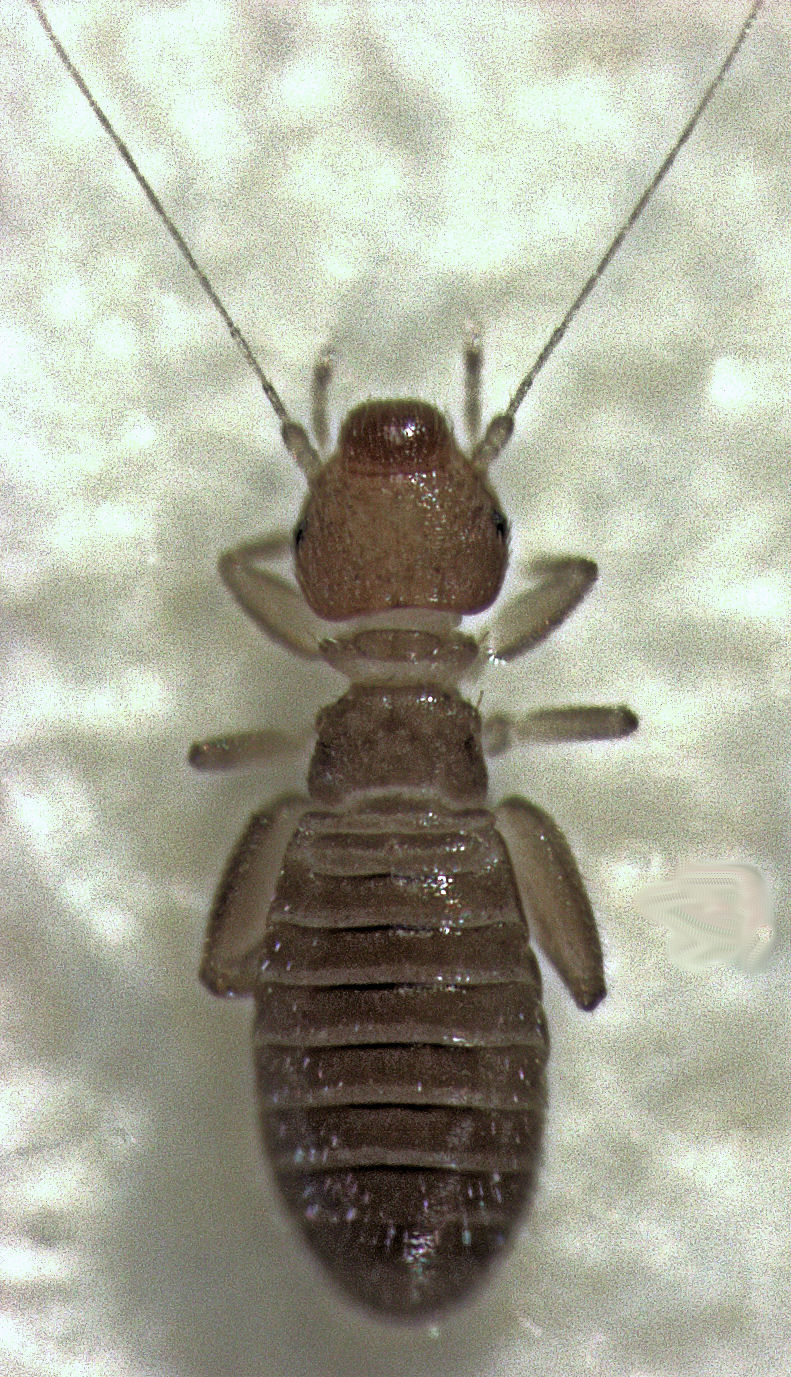
- Liposcelis (Liposcelididae)

Scientific classification
- Kingdom: Animalia
- Phylum: Arthropoda
- Clade: Pancrustacea
- Class: Insecta
- Order: Psocodea
- Suborder: Troctomorpha; Roesler, 1944

Infraorders
- Amphientometae; Amphientomidae; Compsocidae; †Electrentomidae; Manicapsocidae; Musapsocidae; Protroctopsocidae; Troctopsocidae; Nanopsocetae; Liposcelidae; Pachytroctidae; Sphaeropsocidae; Phthiraptera (lice)

= Troctomorpha =

Troctomorpha Temporal range: Late Jurassic–Present

Suborder of booklice

Troctomorpha is one of the three major suborders of Psocodea (formerly Psocoptera)(barklice, booklice, and parasitic lice), alongside Psocomorpha and Trogiomorpha. There are more than 30 families and 5,800 described species in Troctomorpha. The order includes parasitic lice, which are most closely related to the booklice family Liposcelididae.

== Cladogram ==
Cladogram showing the position of Troctomorpha within Psocodea:

- Psocodea
  - - Troctomorpha
      - Nanopsocetae
        - - Phthiraptera
            - - Philopteridae
              - - - Anoplura
                  - Rhynchophthirina
                - Trichodectidae
            - Amblycera
          - Liposcelididae
        - - Pachytroctidae
          - Sphaeropsocidae
      - Amphientometae
    - Psocomorpha
      - - - Homilopsocidea
          - Caeciliusetae
        - - - Psocetae
            - Epipsocetae
          - Philotarsetae
      - Archipsocetae
  - Trogiomorpha
    - - Atropetae
      - Psyllipsocetae
    - Prionoglaridetae (paraphyletic)

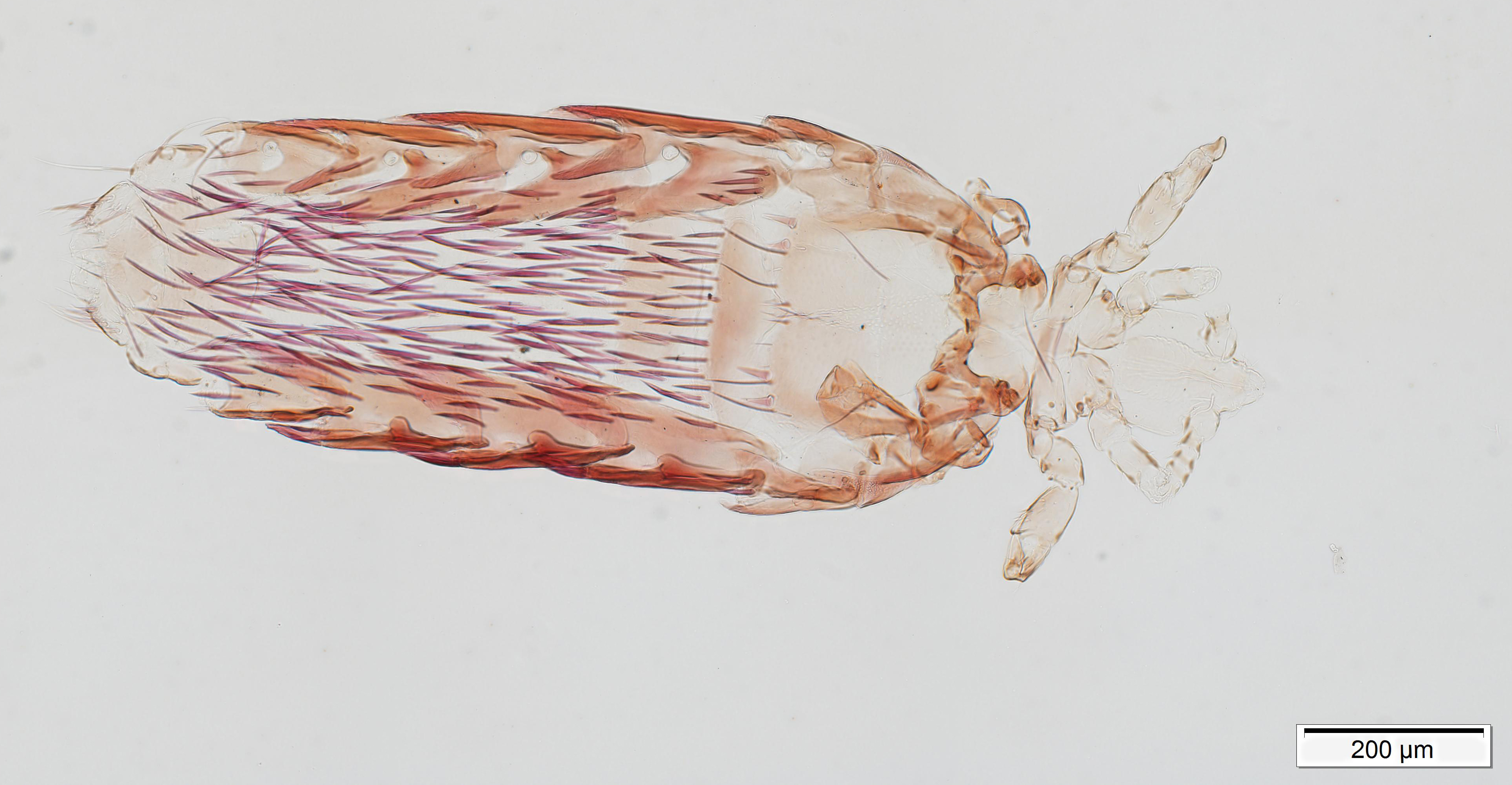
Schizophthirus pleurophaeus

== Fossil record ==
The oldest record of the suborder is suggested to be Paramesopsocus adibi, known from the Late Jurassic Karabastau Formation of Kazakhstan.

== Classification ==
Troctomorpha contains the following subgroups:

- Infraorder: Amphientometae
  - Family: Amphientomidae Enderlein, 1903 (tropical barklice)
  - Family: Compsocidae Mockford, 1967
  - Family: Electrentomidae Enderlein, 1911
  - Family: Manicapsocidae Mockford, 1967
  - Family: Musapsocidae Mockford, 1967
  - Family: Protroctopsocidae Smithers, 1972
  - Family: Troctopsocidae Mockford, 1967
- Infraorder: Nanopsocetae
  - Family: Liposcelididae Broadhead, 1950 (booklice)
  - Family: Pachytroctidae Enderlein, 1904 (thick barklice)
  - Family: Sphaeropsocidae Menon, 1941
  - Parvorder: Phthiraptera
    - Superfamily: Amblycera
      - Family: Ancistronidae
      - Family: Boopiidae Mjoberg, 1910
      - Family: Colpocephalidae Eichler, 1937
      - Family: Gliricolidae
      - Family: Gyropidae Kellogg, 1896
      - Family: Laemobothriidae Mjoberg, 1910
      - Family: Menoponidae Mjoberg, 1910 (chicken body lice)
      - Family: Pseudomenoponidae Mjoberg, 1910
      - Family: Ricinidae Neumann, 1890
      - Family: Somaphantidae Eichler, 1941
      - Family: Trimenoponidae
      - Family: Trinotonidae Eichler, 1941
    - Superfamily: Anoplura
      - Family: Echinophthiriidae Enderlein, 1904 (seal lice)
      - Family: Enderleinellidae Ewing, 1929
      - Family: Haematopinidae Enderlein, 1904 (ungulate lice)
      - Family: Hamophthiriidae Johnson, 1969
      - Family: Hoplopleuridae Ewing, 1929 (armoured lice)
      - Family: Hybothiridae Ewing, 1929
      - Family: Linognathidae Webb, 1946 (pale lice)
      - Family: Microthoraciidae Kim & Lugwig, 1978
      - Family: Neolinognathidae Fahrenholz, 1936
      - Family: Pecaroecidae Kéler, 1963
      - Family: Pedicinidae Enderlein, 1904
      - Family: Pediculidae Leach, 1817 (body lice, head lice)
      - Family: Polyplacidae Fahrenholz, 1912 (spiny rat lice)
      - Family: Pthiridae Ewing, 1929 (crab lice or pubic lice)
      - Family: Ratemiidae Kim & Lugwig, 1978
    - Superfamily: Ischnocera (paraphyletic)
      - Family: Bovicolidae
      - Family: Dasyonygidae
      - Family: Goniodidae
      - Family: Heptapsogasteridae
      - Family: Lipeuridae
      - Family: Philopteridae Nitzsch, 1818 (paraphyletic)
      - Family: Trichodectidae
      - Family: Trichophilopteridae
    - Superfamily: Rhynchophthirina
      - Family: Haematomyzidae Enderlein, 1904
