= Musapsocidae =

Scientific classification
- Kingdom: Animalia
- Phylum: Arthropoda
- Clade: Pancrustacea
- Class: Insecta
- Order: Psocodea
- Suborder: Troctomorpha
- Infraorder: Amphientometae
- Family: Musapsocidae

Genera
- Musapsocoides; Musapsocus

Family of booklice

Musapsocidae is a family of Psocodea (formerly Psocoptera) belonging to the suborder Troctomorpha. The pterostigma in their fore-wing has the characteristic of not being closed proximally. The family comprises 2 genera.

== Sources ==
- Lienhard, C. & Smithers, C. N. 2002. Psocoptera (Insecta): World Catalogue and Bibliography. Instrumenta Biodiversitatis, vol. 5. Muséum d'histoire naturelle, Genève.
