= Psilopsocidae =

Scientific classification
- Kingdom: Animalia
- Phylum: Arthropoda
- Clade: Pancrustacea
- Class: Insecta
- Order: Psocodea
- Suborder: Psocomorpha
- Infraorder: Psocetae
- Family: Psilopsocidae

Genera
- Psilopsocus

Family of booklice

Psilopsocidae is a family of Psocodea (formerly Psocoptera) belonging to the infraorder Psocetae. Members of the family have a free areola postica and mottled wings. It is the only psocopteran family with records of wood-boring species. The family comprises one genus and seven species.
