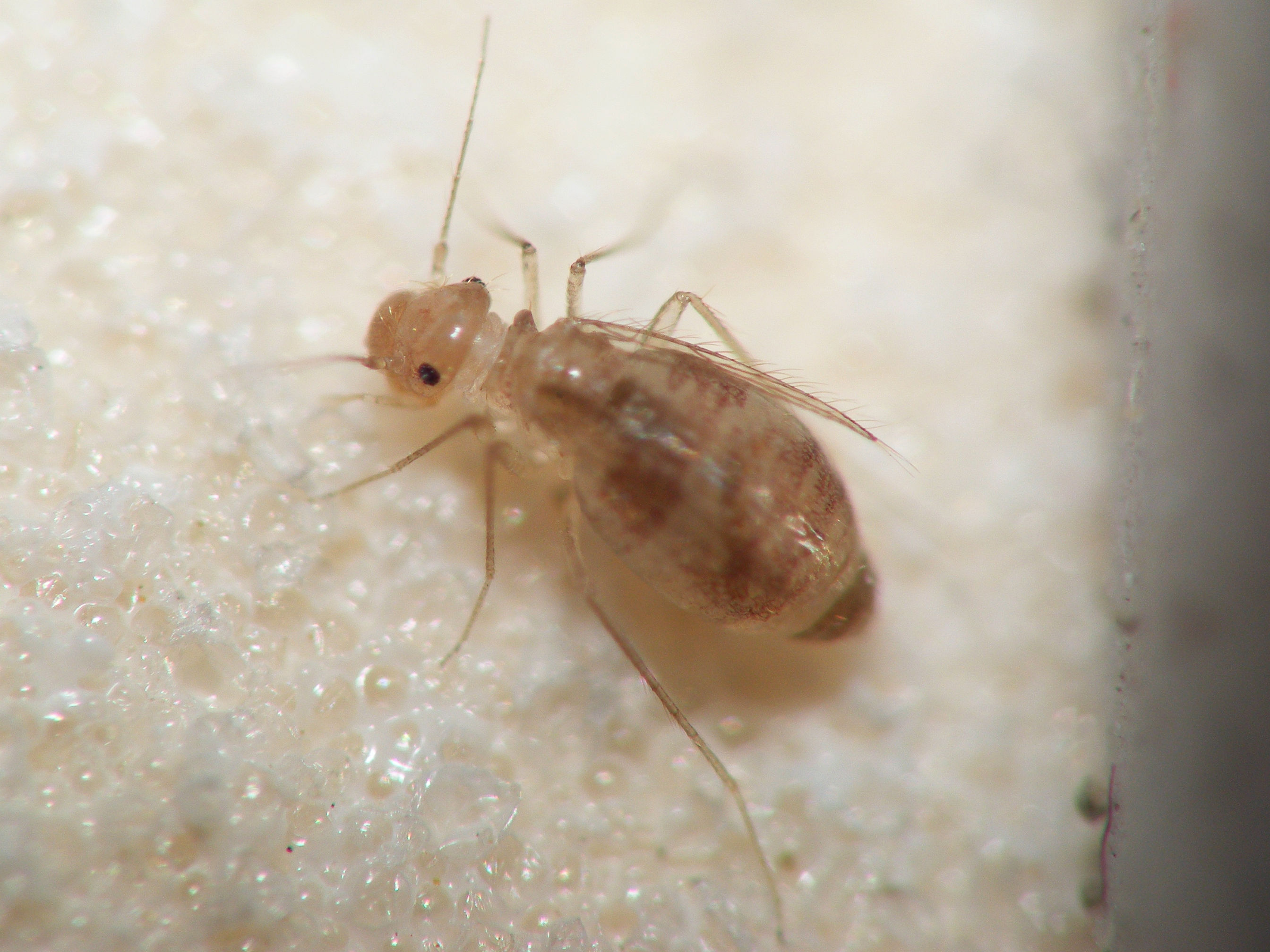
- Dorypteryx domestica

Scientific classification
- Kingdom: Animalia
- Phylum: Arthropoda
- Clade: Pancrustacea
- Class: Insecta
- Order: Psocodea
- Suborder: Trogiomorpha; Roesler, 1940

Infraorders
- See text

= Trogiomorpha =

Trogiomorpha Temporal range: Barremian–Recent

Group of booklice

Trogiomorpha is one of the three major suborders of barklice, booklice, and parasitic lice in the order Psocodea (formerly Psocoptera), alongside Troctomorpha and Psocomorpha. There are about eight families and more than 430 described species in Trogiomorpha. Trogiomorpha is widely agreed to be the earliest diverging of the three suborders, and retains the most primitive characteristics.

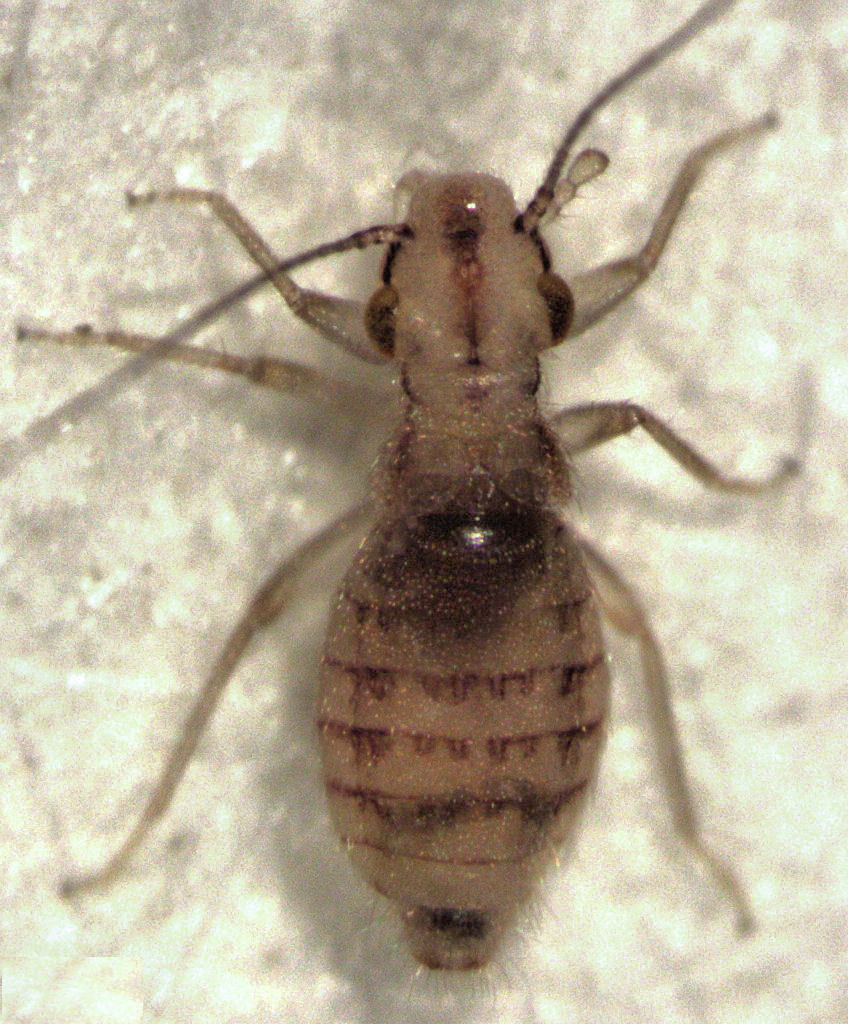
Trogium pulsatorium

== Internal phylogeny ==
The cladogram below shows the position of Trogiomorpha within Psocodea:

- Psocodea
  - - Troctomorpha
      - - - Phthiraptera
          - Liposcelididae
        - - Pachytroctidae
          - Sphaeropsocidae
      - Amphientometae
    - Psocomorpha
  - Trogiomorpha
    - - Atropetae
      - Psyllipsocetae
    - Prionoglaridetae (paraphyletic)

== Characteristics ==
Species of Trogiomorpha possess antennae that are split into 20 or more separate pieces. The tarsi are segmented into three separate equal pieces, and they have a strong posterior spine. They have been described as having a "mothlike" (brown) appearance in color.

== Classification ==
Trogiomorpha contains three infraorders and five extant (living) families, as well as three identified extinct families:

- Atropetae
  - †Archaeatropidae Baz & Ortuño, 2000
  - †Empheriidae Baz & Ortuño, 2000
  - Lepidopsocidae Enderlein, 1903 (scaly-winged barklice)
  - Psoquillidae Lienhard & Smithers, 2002 (bird nest barklice)
  - Trogiidae Roesler, 1944 (granary booklice)
- Psyllipsocetae
  - Psyllipsocidae Lienhard & Smithers, 2002 (cave barklice)
- Prionoglaridetae (paraphyletic)
  - Prionoglarididae Azar, Huang & Nel, 2017 (large-winged psocids)
- Unplaced:
  - †Cormopsocidae Yoshizawa & Lienhard, 2020
