= Electrentomidae =

Electrentomidae Temporal range: Callovian–Eocene

Scientific classification
- Kingdom: Animalia
- Phylum: Arthropoda
- Clade: Pancrustacea
- Class: Insecta
- Order: Psocodea
- Suborder: Troctomorpha
- Infraorder: Amphientometae
- Superfamily: Electrentomoidea
- Family: †Electrentomidae; Enderlein, 1911

Extinct family of booklice

Electrentomidae is an extinct family of barklice, booklice, and parasitic lice in the order Psocodea. There are about six genera and seven described species in Electrentomidae. The family was synonymsed with the extant family Manicapsocidae in 2003 without discussion, with a prior proposal in 1972, but Azar et al., 2017, stated that "we consider herein [Electrentomidae and Manicapsocidae] apart, because a cladistic phylogenetic analysis is needed prior to taking such important decision for these groups."

== Genera ==
These six genera belong to the family Electrentomidae:

- † Electrentomum Enderlein, 1911 Baltic amber, Eocene
- † Eomanicapsocus Nel, Prokop, De Ploeg & Millet, 2005 Oise amber, France, Ypresian
- † Eoprotroctopsocus Nel, Prokop, De Ploeg & Millet, 2005 Oise amber, France, Ypresian
- † Manicapsocidus Baz & Ortuño, 2001 Álava amber, Escucha Formation, Spain, Albian
- † Paramesopsocus Azar, Hajar, Indary & Nel, 2009 Karabastau Formation, Kazakhstan, Callovian, Lebanese amber, Barremian
- † Parelectrentomum Roesler, 1940 Baltic amber, Eocene
