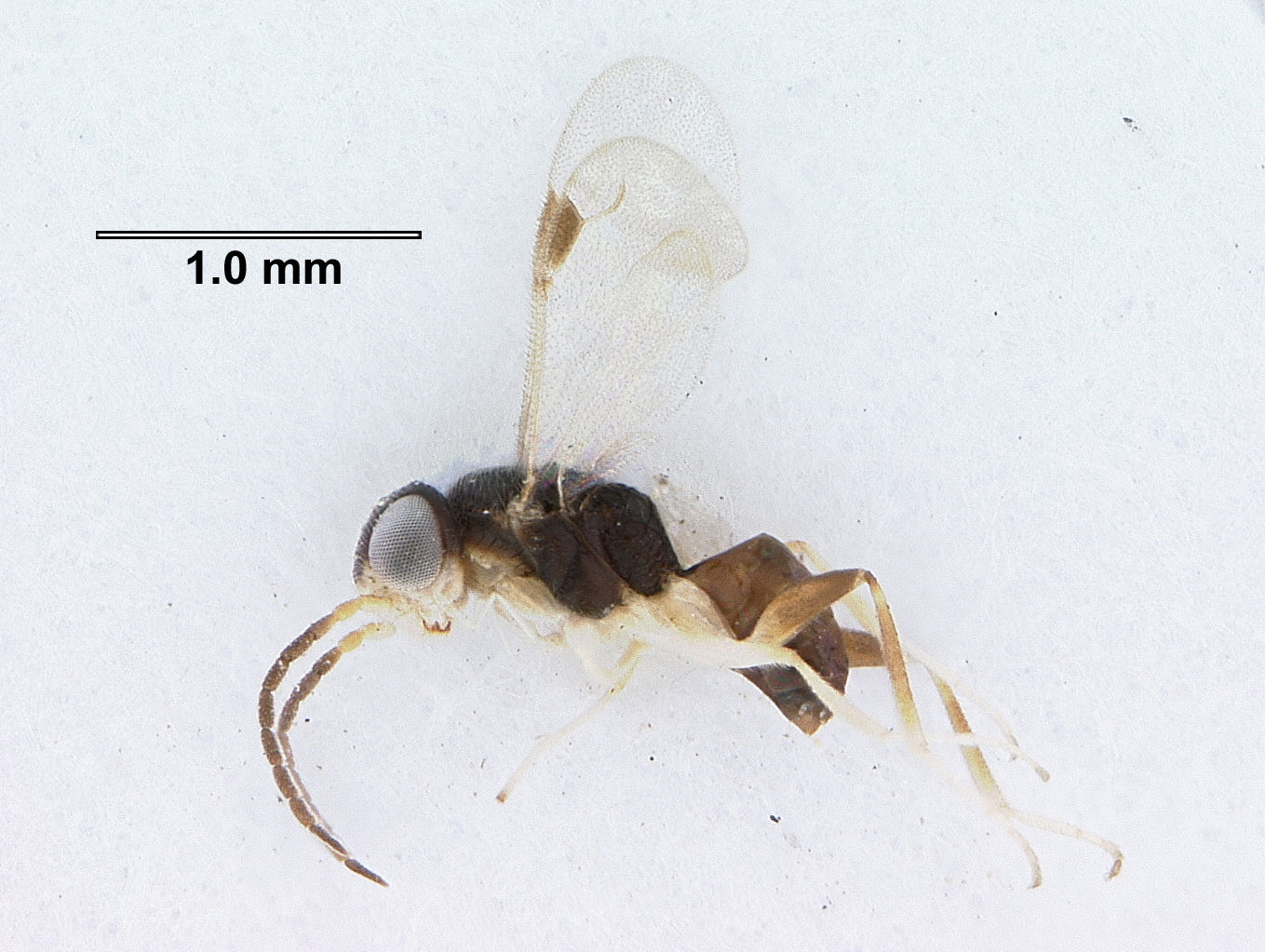
- Aphelopus varicornis

Scientific classification
- Domain: Eukaryota
- Kingdom: Animalia
- Phylum: Arthropoda
- Class: Insecta
- Order: Hymenoptera
- Family: Dryinidae
- Genus: Aphelopus; Dalman, 1823

= Aphelopus =

Genus of insects

Aphelopus is a genus of insects belonging to the family Dryinidae. It is recognizable by only one costal cell surrounded by pigmented veins.

The genus was first described by Dalman in 1823, and has cosmopolitan distribution.

== Species ==
Species:

- Aphelopus atratus (Dalman, 1823)
- Aphelopus bennettii (Olmi 2004)
- Aphelopus camus (Richards 1939)
- Aphelopus koreanus (Olmi 2009)
- Aphelopus luteoceps (Xu & He 1999)
- Aphelopus maetoi (Olmi 1995)
