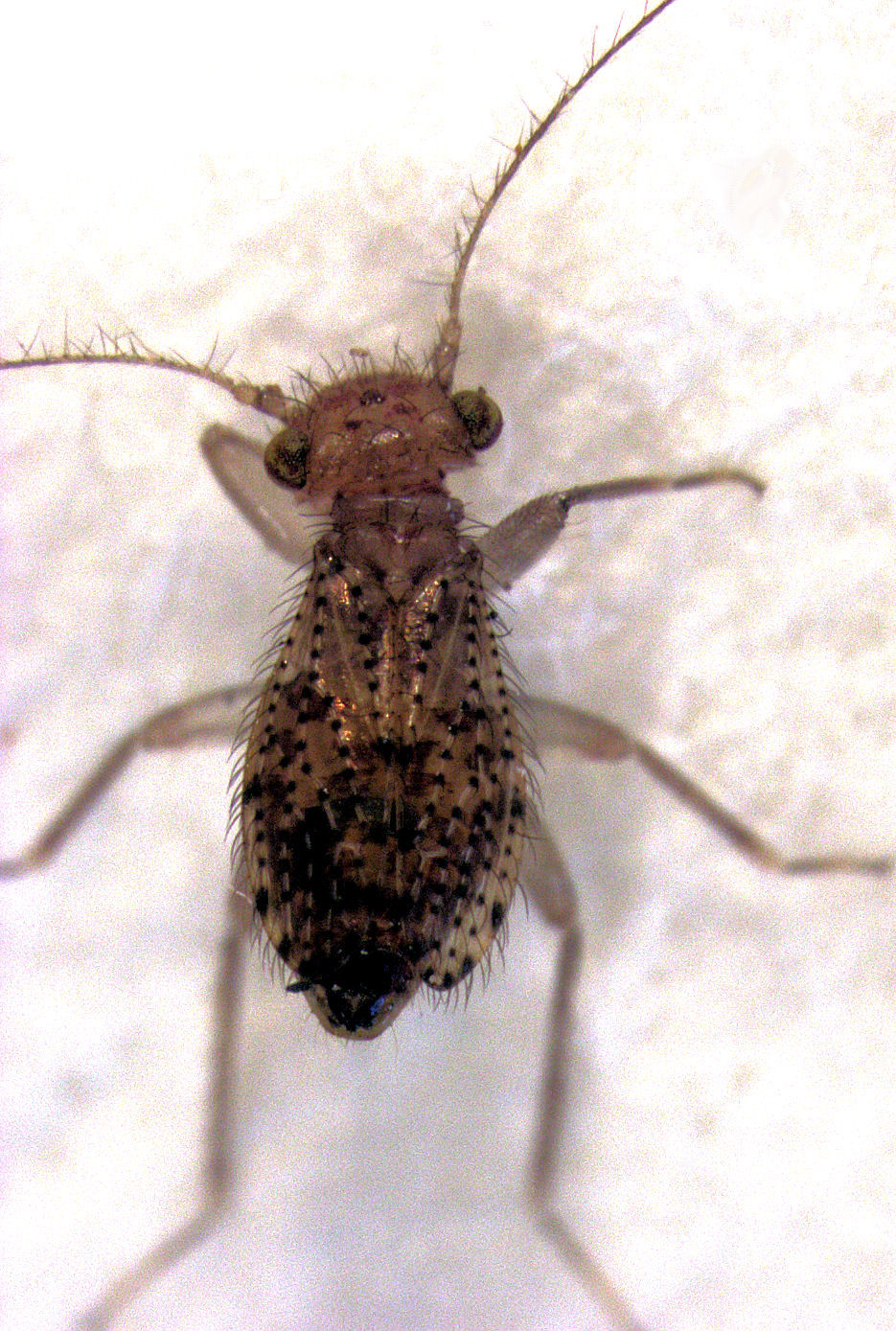
- A species of Hemipsocidae

Scientific classification
- Kingdom: Animalia
- Phylum: Arthropoda
- Class: Insecta
- Order: Psocodea
- Suborder: Psocomorpha
- Infraorder: Psocetae

Families
- Hemipsocidae; Myopsocidae; Psilopsocidae; Psocidae

= Psocetae =

Group of booklice

Psocetae is an infraorder of bark lice in the order Psocodea (formerly Psocoptera), within the suborder Psocomorpha. It includes the families Hemipsocidae, Myopsocidae, Psilopsocidae and Psocidae.

== Characteristics ==
Species in Psocetae are characterized by an oval shaped head with a distinct crevice across the median plane. The tarsi are divided into two segmented pieces, and a group of short curved appendages on each limb is present. The subgenital plate of the exoskeleton on the abdomen is rounded, and both lateral (side) plates are broad and rounded as well.
