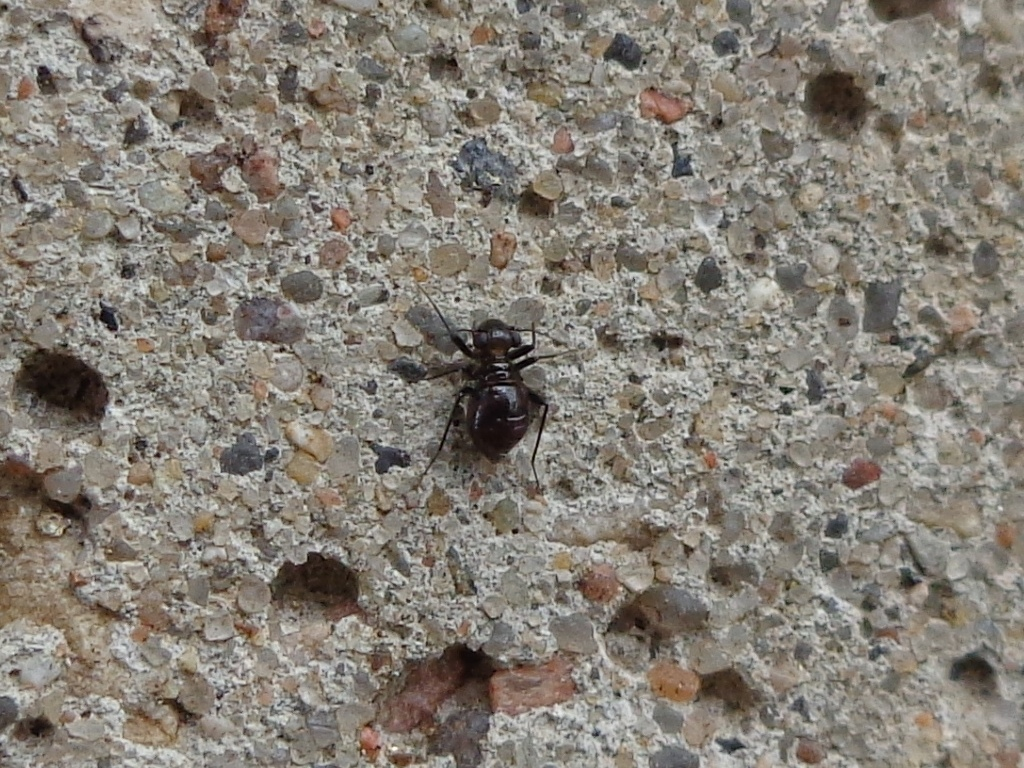
- Bertkauia lucifuga

Scientific classification
- Domain: Eukaryota
- Kingdom: Animalia
- Phylum: Arthropoda
- Class: Insecta
- Order: Psocodea
- Suborder: Psocomorpha
- Infraorder: Epipsocetae

Families
- Cladiopsocidae; Dolabellopsocidae; Epipsocidae; Ptiloneuridae; Spurostigmatidae

= Epipsocetae =

Infraorder of booklice

Epipsocetae is an infraorder of psocids in the order Psocodea (formerly Psocoptera). There are about 5 families and more than 480 described species in Epipsocetae.

== Families ==
These five families belong to the infraorder Epipsocetae:

- Cladiopsocidae Smithers, 1972
- Dolabellopsocidae Eertmoed, 1973
- Epipsocidae Pearman, 1936 (elliptical barklice)
- Ptiloneuridae Roesler, 1940
- Spurostigmatidae Eertmoed, 1973
