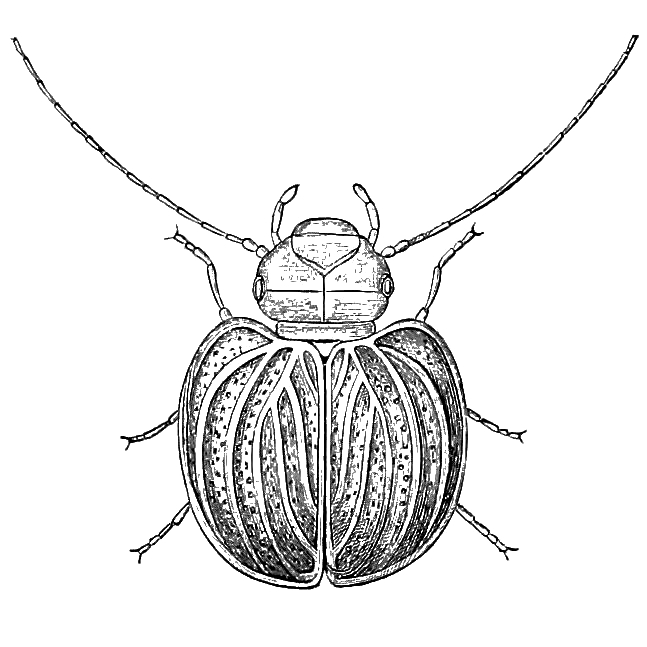
- Sphaeropsocus kuenowii

Scientific classification
- Kingdom: Animalia
- Phylum: Arthropoda
- Clade: Pancrustacea
- Class: Insecta
- Order: Psocodea
- Suborder: Troctomorpha
- Infraorder: Nanopsocetae
- Family: Sphaeropsocidae

Genera
- Badonellia; Sphaeropsocopsis; Sphaeropsocus; Sphaeropsocites; Sphaeropsocoides; Globopsocus; Prosphaeropsocus; Troglosphaeropsocus

= Sphaeropsocidae =

Sphaeropsocidae Temporal range: Barremian–Recent

Family of booklice

Sphaeropsocidae is a family of Psocodea (formerly Psocoptera), belonging to the suborder Troctomorpha. Females of this family have reduced, beetle-like elytra, and lack hindwings, with males have either small or absent wings. The family comprises 22 known species (four of them fossils) in eight genera.

== Taxonomy ==
- †Asphaeropsocites Azar et al. 2010 Lebanese amber, Early Cretaceous (Barremian)
- Badonnelia Pearman, 1953 Chile, Recent (except Badonnelia titei, which is found alongside humans in Europe and North America)
- Sphaeropsocopsis North America, South America, St Helena, Recent
- Sphaeropsocus Baltic amber, Eocene, Southeastern US (Recent)
- †Sphaeropsocites Lebanese amber, Early Cretaceous (Barremian)
- †Sphaeropsocoides Canadian amber, Late Cretaceous (Campanian)
- Globopsocus
- Prosphaeropsocus California, Recent
- Troglosphaeropsocus Arizona, Recent
