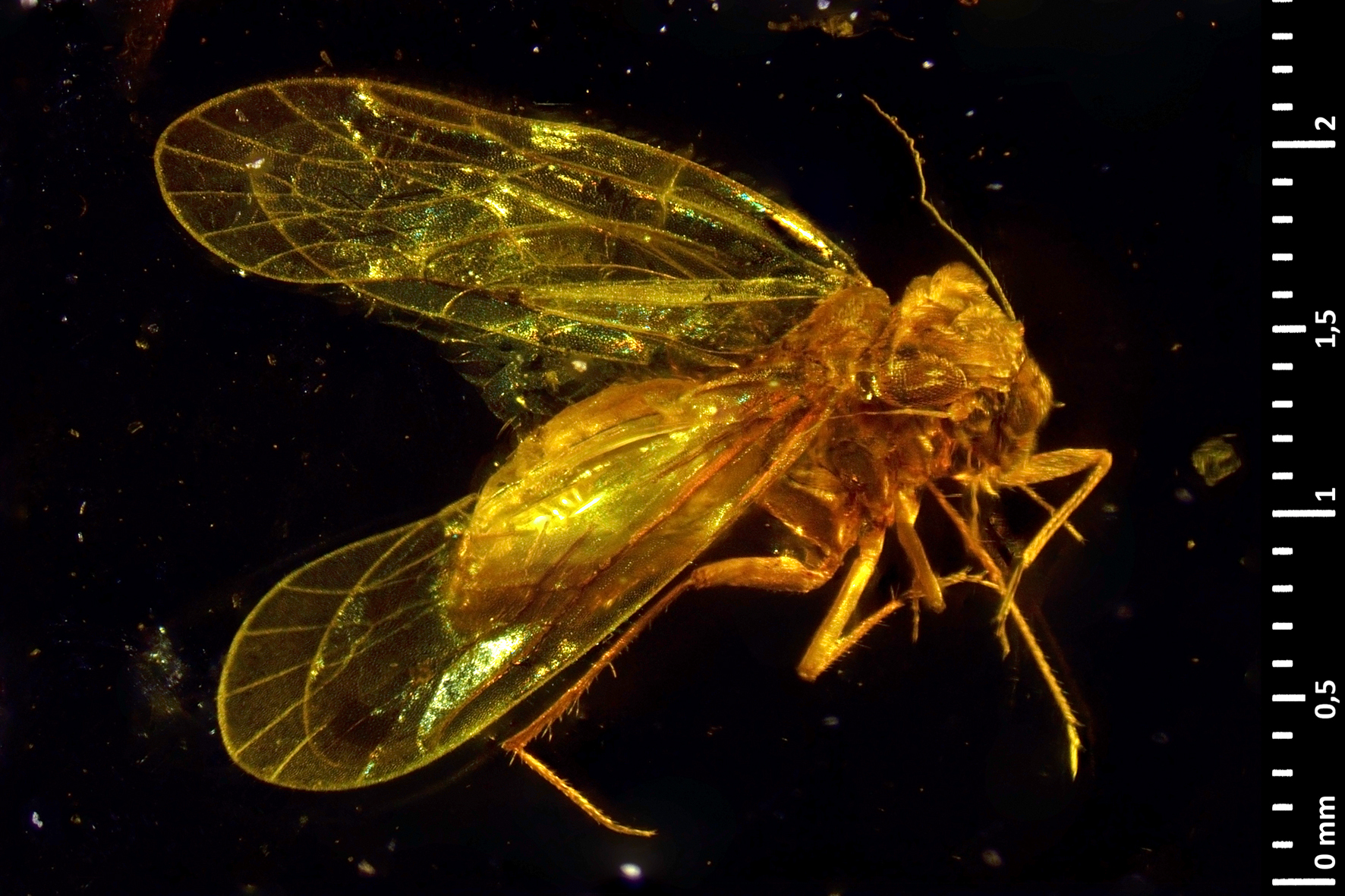
- Burmacompsocus perreaui (Compsocidae)

Scientific classification
- Domain: Eukaryota
- Kingdom: Animalia
- Phylum: Arthropoda
- Class: Insecta
- Order: Psocodea
- Suborder: Troctomorpha
- Infraorder: Amphientometae; Pearman, 1936

= Amphientometae =

Amphientometae Temporal range: Late Jurassic–Recent

Infraorder of booklice

Amphientometae is an infraorder of psocids, one of two major division of the Troctomorpha within the order Psocodea (formerly Psocoptera). There are about 7 families and at least 230 described species in Amphientometae.

== Families ==
These seven families belong to the infraorder Amphientometae:

- Amphientomidae Enderlein, 1903 (tropical barklice)
- Compsocidae Mockford, 1967
- Manicapsocidae Mockford, 1967
- Musapsocidae Mockford, 1967
- Protroctopsocidae Smithers, 1972
- Troctopsocidae Mockford, 1967
- † Electrentomidae Enderlein, 1911
