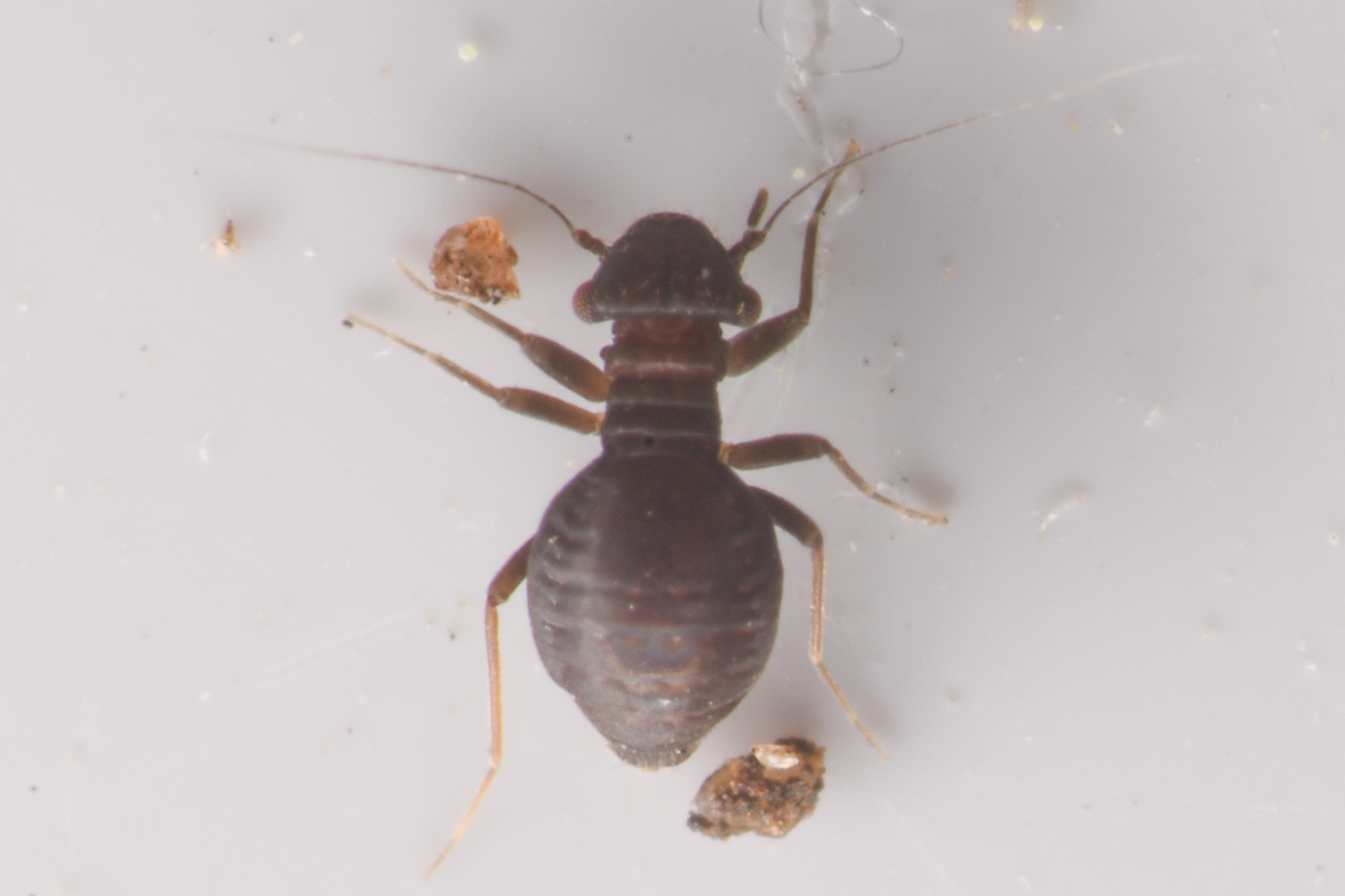

Scientific classification
- Kingdom: Animalia
- Phylum: Arthropoda
- Clade: Pancrustacea
- Class: Insecta
- Order: Psocodea
- Suborder: Troctomorpha
- Infraorder: Nanopsocetae
- Family: Pachytroctidae; Enderlein, 1904

= Pachytroctidae =

Family of booklice

Pachytroctidae is a family of thick barklice in the order Psocodea (formerly Psocoptera). There are about 15 genera and at least 90 described species in Pachytroctidae.

Members of this family are small, often macropterous, with a distinct wing venation.

== Genera ==
These 15 genera belong to the family Pachytroctidae:

- Antilopsocus Gurney, 1965^{c g}
- Atapinella Azar, Huang, Cai & Nel, 2015^{c g}
- Burmipachytrocta Azar, Huang, Cai & Nel, 2015^{c g}
- Leptotroctes Badonnel, 1973^{c g}
- Libaneuphoris Azar, Huang, Cai & Nel, 2015^{c g}
- Libanopsyllipsocus Azar & Nel, 2011^{c g}
- Nanopsocus Pearman, 1928^{i c g b}
- Nymphotroctes Badonnel, 1931^{c g}
- Pachytroctes Enderlein, 1905^{i c g}
- Peritroctes Ribaga, 1911^{c g b}
- Psacadium Enderlein, 1908^{c g}
- Psylloneura Enderlein, 1903^{c g}
- Psyllotroctes Roesler, 1940^{c g}
- Tapinella Enderlein, 1908^{i c g b}
- Thoracotroctes Lienhard, 2005^{c g}

Data sources: i = ITIS, c = Catalogue of Life, g = GBIF, b = Bugguide.net
