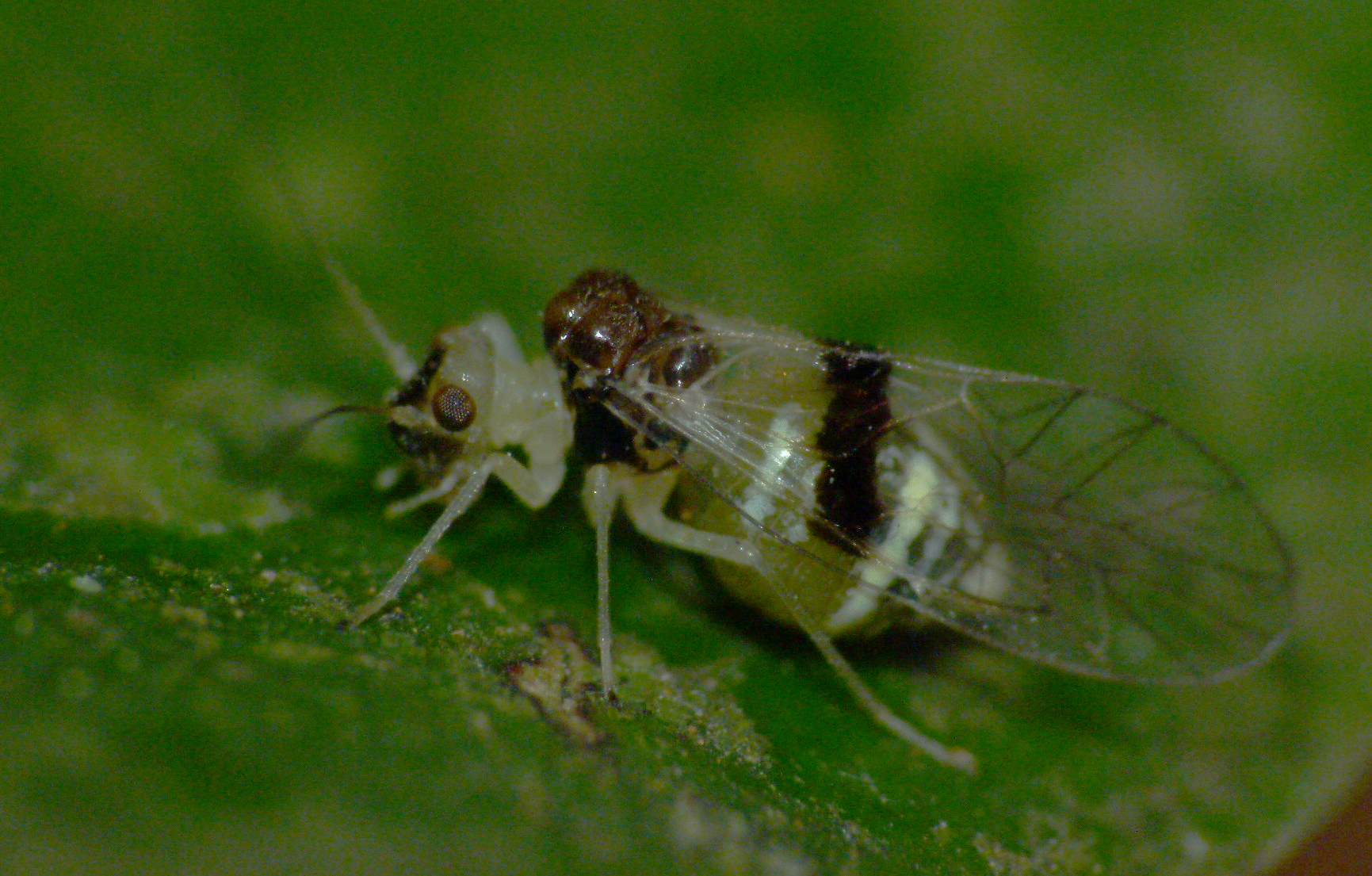
- An unidentified bark louse in the family Stenopsocidae
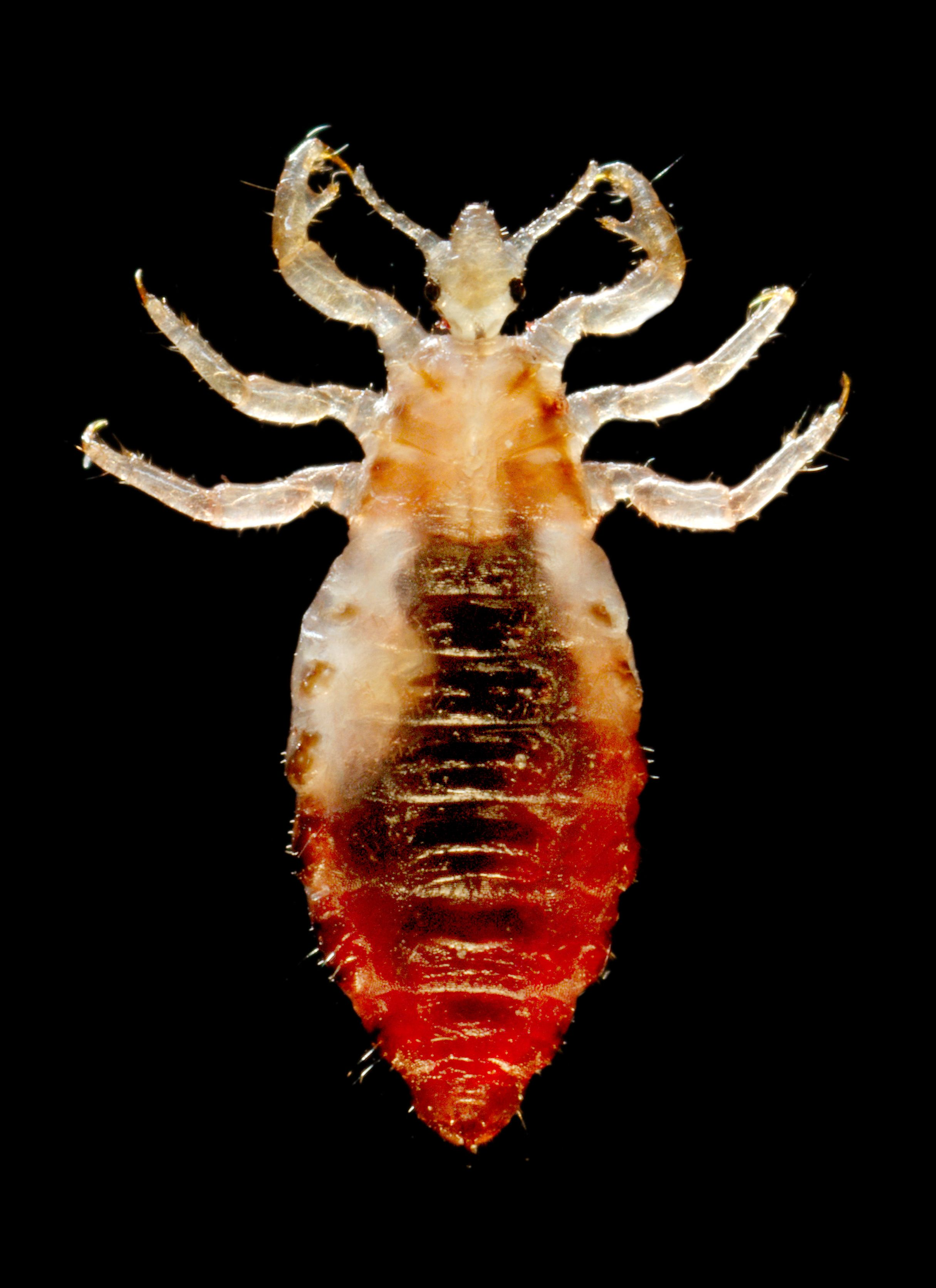
- Human body louse

Scientific classification
- Kingdom: Animalia
- Phylum: Arthropoda
- Clade: Pancrustacea
- Class: Insecta
- Clade: Eumetabola
- Order: Psocodea; Hennig, 1966

Suborders
- Psocomorpha; Troctomorpha; Phthiraptera (lice); Trogiomorpha

= Psocodea =

Psocodea Temporal range: 163–0 Ma Late Jurassic – Recent

Order of insects

Psocodea is a taxonomic group of insects comprising the barklice, booklice and parasitic lice. It was formerly considered a superorder, but is now generally considered by entomologists as an order. Despite the greatly differing appearance of parasitic lice (Phthiraptera), they are believed to have evolved from within the former order Psocoptera, which contained the bark lice and book lice, now found to be paraphyletic.

Psocodea contains around 11,000 species, divided among three suborders and more than 70 families. They range in size from 1–10 millimetres (0.04–0.4 in) in length.

The species known as booklice received their common name because they are commonly found amongst old books—they feed upon the paste used in binding. The barklice are found on trees, feeding on algae and lichen.

== External phylogeny ==
Psocodea has been recovered as a monophyletic group in recent studies. Their next closest relatives are traditionally recognized as the monophyletic grouping Condylognatha that contains Hemiptera (true bugs) and Thysanoptera (thrips), which all combined form the group Paraneoptera. However, this is somewhat unclear, as analysis has shown that Psocodea could instead be the sister taxon to Holometabola, which would render Paraneoptera as paraphyletic.

Here is a simple cladogram showing the traditional relationships with a monophyletic Paraneoptera:

- Neoptera
  - Polyneoptera
  - Eumetabola
    - Holometabola
    - Paraneoptera
      - Psocodea
      - Condylognatha
        - Thysanoptera (thrips)
        - Hemiptera (true bugs)

Here is an alternative cladogram showing Paraneoptera as paraphyletic, with Psocodea as sister taxon to Holometabola:

- Neoptera
  - Polyneoptera
  - Eumetabola
    - - Holometabola
      - Psocodea
    - Condylognatha
      - Thysanoptera (thrips)
      - Hemiptera (true bugs)

== Internal phylogeny ==
Here is a cladogram showing the relationships within Psocodea:

- Psocodea
  - - Troctomorpha
      - - - Phthiraptera
            - - Philopteridae
              - - - Anoplura
                  - Rhynchophthirina
                - Trichodectidae
            - Amblycera
          - Liposcelididae
        - - Pachytroctidae
          - Sphaeropsocidae
      - Amphientometae
    - Psocomorpha
      - - - Homilopsocidea
          - Caeciliusetae
        - - - Psocetae
            - Epipsocetae
          - Philotarsetae
      - Archipsocetae
  - Trogiomorpha
    - - Atropetae
      - Psyllipsocetae
    - Prionoglaridetae (paraphyletic)

== Classification ==
The order Psocodea (formerly 'Psocoptera') is divided into three extant suborders.

=== Suborder Trogiomorpha ===
Trogiomorpha have antennae with many segments (22–50 antennomeres) and always three-segmented tarsi.

Trogiomorpha is the smallest suborder of the Psocoptera sensu stricto (i.e., excluding Phthiraptera), with about 340 species in 7 families, ranging from the fossil family Archaeatropidae with only a handful of species to the speciose Lepidopsocidae (over 200 species). Trogiomorpha comprises infraorder Atropetae (extant families Lepidopsocidae, Psoquillidae and Trogiidae, and fossil families Archaeatropidae and Empheriidae) and infraorder Psocathropetae (families Psyllipsocidae and Prionoglarididae).

=== Suborder Troctomorpha ===
Troctomorpha have antennae with 15–17 segments and two-segmented tarsi.

Troctomorpha comprises the Infraorder Amphientometae (families Amphientomidae, Compsocidae, Electrentomidae, Musapsocidae, Protroctopsocidae and Troctopsocidae) and Infraorder Nanopsocetae (families Liposcelididae, Pachytroctidae and Sphaeropsocidae). Troctomorpha are now known to also contain the order Phthiraptera (lice), and are therefore paraphyletic, as are Psocoptera as a whole.

Some Troctomorpha, such as Liposcelis (which are similar to lice in morphology), are often found in birds' nests, and it is possible that a similar behavior in the ancestors of lice is at the origin of the parasitism seen today.

=== Suborder Psocomorpha ===
Psocomorpha are notable for having antennae with 13 segments. They have two- or three-segmented tarsi, this condition being constant (e.g., Psocidae) or variable (e.g., Pseudocaeciliidae) within families. Their wing venation is variable, the most common type being that found in the genus Caecilius (rounded, free areola postica, thickened, free pterostigma, r+s two-branched, m three-branched). Additional veins are found in some families and genera (Dicropsocus and Goja in Epipsocidae, many Calopsocidae, etc.)

Psocomorpha is the largest suborder of the Psocoptera sensu stricto (i.e., excluding Phthiraptera), with about 3,600 species in 24 families, ranging from the species-poor Bryopsocidae (2 spp.) to the speciose Psocidae (about 900 spp). Psocomorpha comprises Infraorder Epipsocetae (families Cladiopsocidae, Dolabellopsocidae, Epipsocidae, Neurostigmatidae and Ptiloneuridae), Infraorder Caeciliusetae (families Amphipsocidae, Asiopsocidae, Caeciliusidae, Dasydemellidae and Stenopsocidae), Infraorder Homilopsocidea (families Archipsocidae, Bryopsocidae, Calopsocidae, Ectopsocidae, Elipsocidae, Lachesillidae, Mesopsocidae, Peripsocidae, Philotarsidae, Pseudocaeciliidae and Trichopsocidae) and Infraorder Psocetae (families Hemipsocidae, Myopsocidae, Psilopsocidae and Psocidae).
