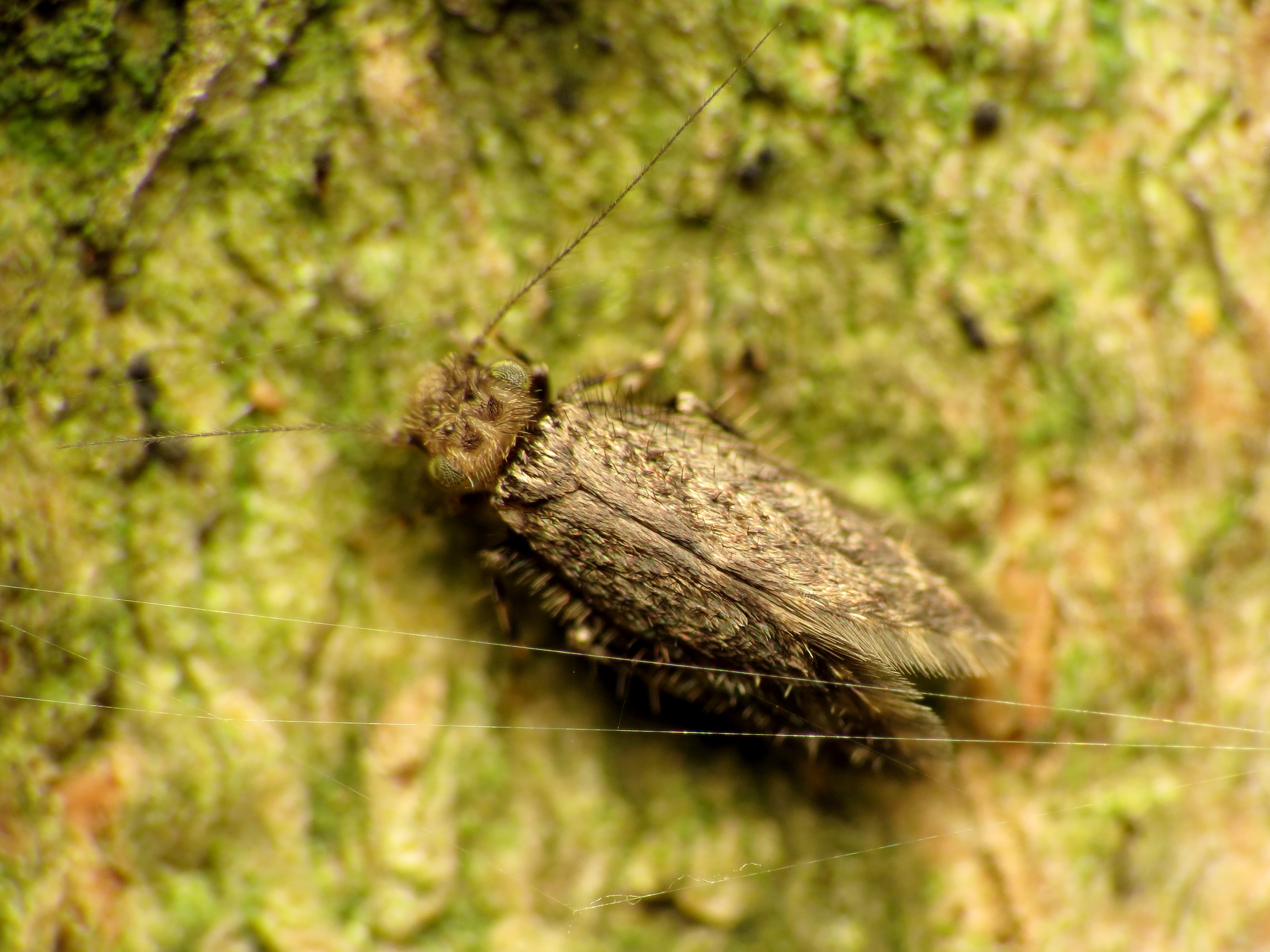
- Echmepteryx hageni
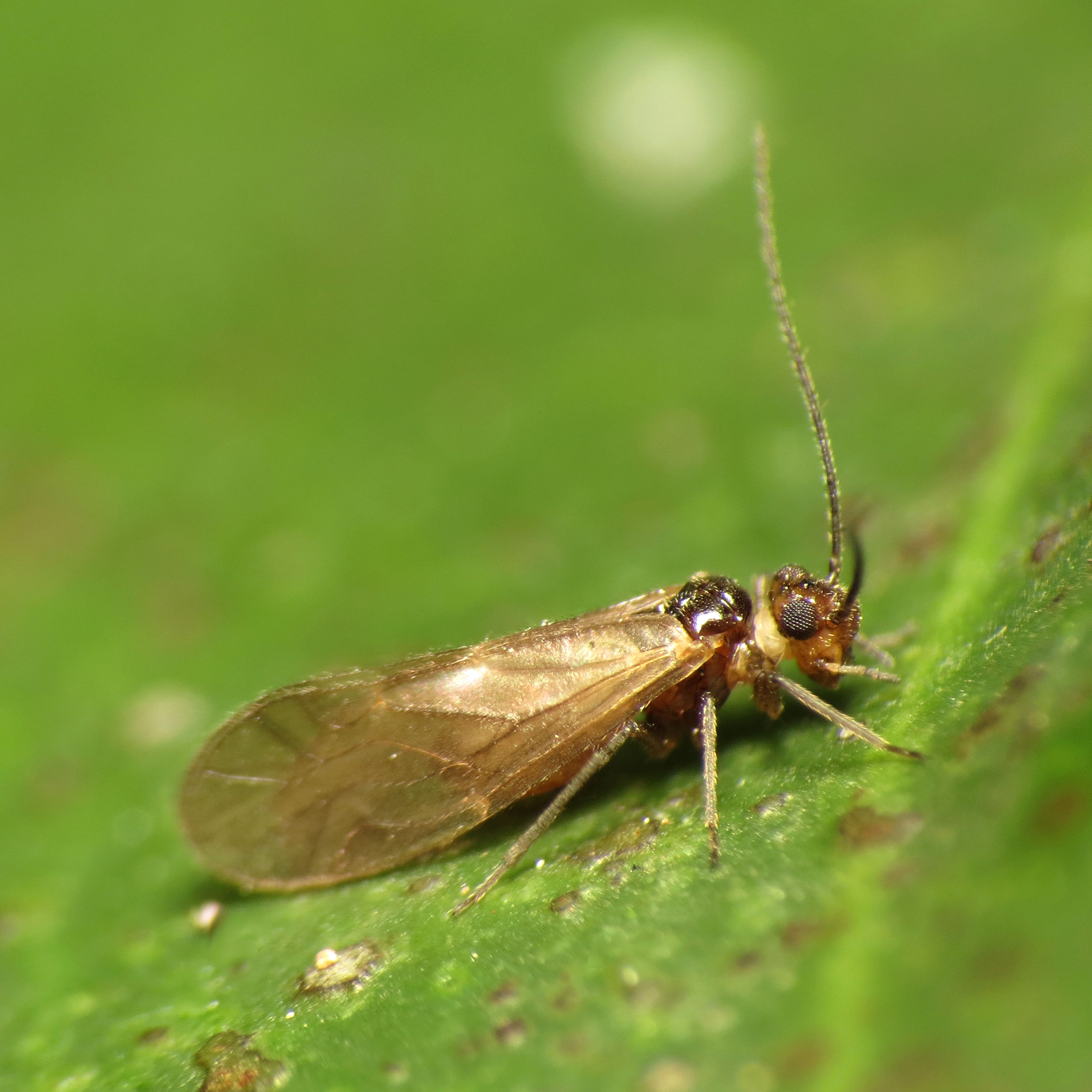
- Unidentified barklouse

Scientific classification
- Kingdom: Animalia
- Phylum: Arthropoda
- Clade: Pancrustacea
- Class: Insecta
- (unranked): Paraneoptera
- (unranked): Psocoptera

Groups included
- Psocomorpha (26 families); Troctomorpha (34 families); Trogiomorpha (7 families); †Parapsocida

Cladistically included but traditionally excluded taxa
- Phthiraptera

= Psocoptera =

Psocoptera Temporal range: 163–0 Ma Late Jurassic – Recent

Order of insects

Psocoptera (/soʊˈkɒptərə/) are a paraphyletic group of insects that are commonly known as booklice, barklice or barkflies. The name Psocoptera has been replaced with Psocodea in recent literature, with the inclusion of the former order Phthiraptera into Psocodea (as part of the suborder Troctomorpha).

They are often regarded as the most primitive of the paraneopterans. There are more than 5,500 species in 41 families in three suborders. Many of these species have only been described in the early twenty-first century. They range in size from 1–10 millimetres (1/32–13/32 in) in length.

The booklice received their common name because they are commonly found amongst old books—they feed upon the paste used in binding. They are also commonly found on trees, feeding on algae and lichen in wide variety of climates.

== Etymology ==
Their name originates from the Greek word ψῶχος (psokhos), meaning "gnawed" or "rubbed" and πτερά (ptera), meaning "wings".

== Classification ==
In the 2000s, morphological and molecular phylogenetic evidence has shown that the parasitic lice (Phthiraptera) evolved from within the psocopteran suborder Troctomorpha, thus making Psocoptera paraphyletic with respect to Phthiraptera. In modern systematics, Psocoptera and Phthiraptera are therefore treated together in the order Psocodea.

Here is a cladogram showing the relationships within Psocodea, with the former grouping Psocoptera highlighted:

- Psocodea
  - - Troctomorpha
      - - - Phthiraptera
          - Liposcelididae
        - - Pachytroctidae
          - Sphaeropsocidae
      - Amphientometae
    - Psocomorpha
  - Trogiomorpha

== Anatomy and biology ==
Psocids are small, scavenging insects with a relatively generalized body plan. They feed primarily on fungi, algae, lichen, and organic detritus in nature but are also known to feed on starch-based household items like grains, wallpaper glue and book bindings. They have chewing mandibles, and the central lobe of the maxilla is modified into a slender rod. This rod is used to brace the insect while it scrapes up detritus with its mandibles. They also have a swollen forehead, large compound eyes, and three ocelli. Their bodies are soft with a segmented abdomen. Some species can spin silk from glands in their mouth. They may festoon large sections of trunk and branches in dense swathes of silk.

Some psocids have small ovipositors that are up to 1.5 times as long as the hindwings, and all four wings have a relatively simple venation pattern, with few cross-veins. The wings, if present, are held tent-like over the body. The legs are slender and adapted for jumping, rather than gripping, as in the true lice. The abdomen has nine segments, and no cerci.

There is often considerable variation in the appearance of individuals within the same species. Many have no wings or ovipositors, and may have a different shape to the thorax. Other, more subtle, variations are also known, such as changes to the development of the setae. The significance of such changes is uncertain, but their function appears to be different from similar variations in, for example, aphids. Like aphids, however, many psocids are parthenogenetic, and the presence of males may even vary between different races of the same species.

Psocids lay their eggs in minute crevices or on foliage, although a few species are known to be viviparous. The young are born as miniature, wingless versions of the adult. These nymphs typically molt six times before reaching full adulthood. The total lifespan of a psocid is rarely more than a few months.

Booklice range from approximately 1–2 millimetres (1/32–3/32 in). Some species are wingless and they are easily mistaken for bedbug nymphs and vice versa. Booklouse eggs take two to four weeks to hatch and can reach adulthood approximately two months later. Adult booklice can live for six months. Besides damaging books, they also sometimes infest food storage areas, where they feed on dry, starchy materials. Although some psocids feed on starchy household products, the majority of psocids are woodland insects with little to no contact with humans, therefore they are of little economic importance. They are scavengers and do not bite humans.

Psocids can affect the ecosystems in which they reside. Many psocids can affect decomposition by feeding on detritus, especially in environments with lower densities of predacious micro arthropods that may eat psocids. The nymph of a psocid species, Psilopsocus mimulus, is the first known wood-boring psocopteran. These nymphs make their own burrows in woody material, rather than inhabiting vacated, existing burrows. This boring activity can create habitats that other organisms may use.

== Interaction with humans ==
Some species of psocids, such as Liposcelis bostrychophila, are common pests of stored products. Psocids, among other arthropods, have been studied to develop new pest control techniques in food manufacturing. One study found that modified atmospheres during packing (MAP) helped to control the reoccurrence of pests during the manufacturing process and prevented further infestation in the final products that go to consumers.
