= List of Peripsocus species =

This is a list of 251 species in Peripsocus, a genus of stout barklice in the family Peripsocidae.

== Peripsocus species ==
- Peripsocus acuminatus Turner, B. D. & Cheke, 1983^{c g}
- Peripsocus africanus Enderlein, 1902^{c g}
- Peripsocus alachuae Mockford, 1971^{i c g b}
- Peripsocus alboguttatus (Dalman, 1823)^{i c g}
- Peripsocus ammonus Li, Fasheng, 2002^{c g}
- Peripsocus angolensis Smithers, Courtenay, 1959^{c g}
- Peripsocus annectens Li, Fasheng, 2002^{c g}
- Peripsocus annulatus Badonnel, 1967^{c g}
- Peripsocus anura Vaughan, Thornton & New, 1991^{c g}
- Peripsocus apicatus Cole, New & Thornton, 1989^{c g}
- Peripsocus apiculatus Li, Fasheng, 2002^{c g}
- Peripsocus attenuatus Li, Fasheng, 2002^{c g}
- Peripsocus australis Mockford, 1971^{c g}
- Peripsocus badimaculatus Li, Fasheng, 1993^{c g}
- Peripsocus baishanzuicus Li, Fasheng, 1995^{c g}
- Peripsocus baiyunshanicus Li, Fasheng, 2002^{c g}
- Peripsocus balli Badonnel, 1948^{c g}
- Peripsocus barunus Vaughan, Thornton & New, 1991^{c g}
- Peripsocus beijingensis Li, Fasheng, 2002^{c g}
- Peripsocus bhaktai Badonnel, 1981^{c g}
- Peripsocus biacanthus Li, Fasheng & Chikun Yang, 1988^{c g}
- Peripsocus bifasciarius Li, Fasheng, 2002^{c g}
- Peripsocus bifasciatus Schmidt, E. R. & Thornton, 1993^{c g}
- Peripsocus bifidus Thornton, 1984^{c g}
- Peripsocus bilobatus Broadhead & Alison Richards, 1980^{c g}
- Peripsocus bonnieae Thornton, 1990^{c g}
- Peripsocus brachyura Thornton & Wong, 1968^{c g}
- Peripsocus brinchangensis New & S. S. Lee, 1991^{c g}
- Peripsocus brunneus Datta, 1965^{c g}
- Peripsocus bucephalus Li, Fasheng, 1992^{c g}
- Peripsocus bucerus Li, Fasheng, 1992^{c g}
- Peripsocus bulbus Li, Fasheng, 2002^{c g}
- Peripsocus camerunus Badonnel, 1943^{c g}
- Peripsocus cassideus Li, Fasheng, 1999^{c g}
- Peripsocus caudatus Li, Fasheng, 1997^{c g}
- Peripsocus chamelanus Badonnel, 1986^{c g}
- Peripsocus changbaishanicus Li, Fasheng, 2002^{c g}
- Peripsocus chekei Turner, B. D., 1975^{c g}
- Peripsocus circinus Thornton & Wong, 1968^{c g}
- Peripsocus coccophagus Badonnel, 1935^{c g}
- Peripsocus cochleus Schmidt, E. R. & New, 2008^{c g}
- Peripsocus conoidalis Li, Fasheng, 2002^{c g}
- Peripsocus consobrinus Pearman, J. V., 1951^{c g}
- Peripsocus constrictus Thornton & Wong, 1968^{c g}
- Peripsocus corollaris Li, Fasheng, 2002^{c g}
- Peripsocus crassicosta New & S. S. Lee, 1991^{c g}
- Peripsocus crenulatus Thornton & Wong, 1968^{c g}
- Peripsocus curviclavus Broadhead & Alison Richards, 1980^{c g}
- Peripsocus cylindratus Li, Fasheng, 2002^{c g}
- Peripsocus decellei Badonnel, 1976^{c g}
- Peripsocus decurvatus Li, Fasheng, 1995^{c g}
- Peripsocus denticulatus Thornton & Wong, 1968^{c g}
- Peripsocus didymus Roesler, 1939^{c g}
- Peripsocus disdentus Li, Fasheng, 1997^{c g}
- Peripsocus dolichophallus Badonnel, 1986^{c g}
- Peripsocus dongbeiensis Li, Fasheng, 2002^{c g}
- Peripsocus duodecimidentus Li, Fasheng, 2002^{c g}
- Peripsocus elongatus New & Thornton, 1976^{c g}
- Peripsocus equispineus Li, Fasheng, 2002^{c g}
- Peripsocus exilis Li, Fasheng, 1997^{c g}
- Peripsocus falsipictus Li, Fasheng, 2002^{c g}
- Peripsocus ferrugineus Thornton & Wong, 1968^{c g}
- Peripsocus fici Smithers, Courtenay, 1984^{c g}
- Peripsocus forcipatus Li, Fasheng, 1993^{c g}
- Peripsocus forficatus Li, Fasheng, 2002^{c g}
- Peripsocus fornicalis Li, Fasheng, 1999^{c g}
- Peripsocus frimensis New & S. S. Lee, 1991^{c g}
- Peripsocus fulvescens Navás, 1920^{c g}
- Peripsocus furcellatus Li, Fasheng, 2002^{c g}
- Peripsocus ghesquierei Badonnel, 1948^{c g}
- Peripsocus golubae Lienhard, 2006^{c g}
- Peripsocus grandispineus Li, Fasheng, 2002^{c g}
- Peripsocus guandishanicus Li, Fasheng, 2002^{c g}
- Peripsocus guttulatus Badonnel, 1967^{c g}
- Peripsocus hainanensis Li, Fasheng, 2002^{c g}
- Peripsocus hamiltonae Smithers, Courtenay, 1977^{c g}
- Peripsocus haplacanthus Li, Fasheng, 1993^{c g}
- Peripsocus hedinianus Enderlein, 1934^{c g}
- Peripsocus helenae Lienhard, 2011^{c g}
- Peripsocus hickmani New, 1973^{c g}
- Peripsocus hinduensis Garcia Aldrete, 1999^{c g}
- Peripsocus hollowayi Smithers, Courtenay, 1984^{c g}
- Peripsocus hongkongensis Thornton & Wong, 1968^{c g}
- Peripsocus huashanensis Li, Fasheng, 2002^{c g}
- Peripsocus hutsoni New, 1977^{c g}
- Peripsocus hyalinus Enderlein, 1903^{c g}
- Peripsocus ignis Okamoto, 1910^{c g}
- Peripsocus incertus Badonnel, 1986^{c g}
- Peripsocus incoloratus Turner, B. D., 1975^{c g}
- Peripsocus inflatus Li, Fasheng, 2001^{c g}
- Peripsocus intricatus Smithers, Courtenay, 1964^{c g}
- Peripsocus jianfenglingicus Li, Fasheng, 2002^{c g}
- Peripsocus jiangxiensis Li, Fasheng, 2002^{c g}
- Peripsocus jilinicus Li, Fasheng, 2002^{c g}
- Peripsocus jinggangshanicus Li, Fasheng, 2002^{c g}
- Peripsocus jinshaanensis Li, Fasheng, 2002^{c g}
- Peripsocus jinxiuensis Li, Fasheng, 2002^{c g}
- Peripsocus juniperi Turner, B. D., 1975^{c g}
- Peripsocus kashmirensis Badonnel, 1981^{c g}
- Peripsocus keniensis Broadhead & Alison Richards, 1980^{c g}
- Peripsocus kunmingiensis Li, Fasheng, 2002^{c g}
- Peripsocus laoshanicus Li, Fasheng, 2002^{c g}
- Peripsocus laricis Li, Fasheng, 2002^{c g}
- Peripsocus latispineus Li, Fasheng, 2002^{c g}
- Peripsocus leptorrhizus Li, Fasheng, 1997^{c g}
- Peripsocus lifashengi Li, Fasheng, 2002^{c g}
- Peripsocus limi New & Thornton, 1976^{c g}
- Peripsocus longifurcus Li, Fasheng, 2002^{c g}
- Peripsocus longivalvus Badonnel, 1986^{c g}
- Peripsocus louguantaiensis Li, Fasheng, 2002^{c g}
- Peripsocus lunaris Li, Fasheng, 1993^{c g}
- Peripsocus luotongshanicus Li, Fasheng, 2002^{c g}
- Peripsocus machadoi Badonnel, 1955^{c g}
- Peripsocus macrosiphus Li, Fasheng, 1993^{c g}
- Peripsocus maculosus Mockford, 1971^{i c g b}
- Peripsocus madecassus Badonnel, 1967^{c g}
- Peripsocus madescens (Walsh, 1863)^{i c g b}
- Peripsocus madidus (Hagen, 1861)^{i c g b}
- Peripsocus magnimammus Li, Fasheng, 2002^{c g}
- Peripsocus maoricus (Tillyard, 1923)^{c g}
- Peripsocus marginatus Turner, B. D. & Cheke, 1983^{c g}
- Peripsocus medifasciarius Li, Fasheng, 2002^{c g}
- Peripsocus medimacularis Li, Fasheng, 1995^{c g}
- Peripsocus medispineus Li, Fasheng, 2002^{c g}
- Peripsocus megalophus Li, Fasheng, 1995^{c g}
- Peripsocus melaleucae New, 1971^{c g}
- Peripsocus menieri Badonnel, 1984^{c g}
- Peripsocus meridionalis Li, Fasheng, 1999^{c g}
- Peripsocus microcheilius Li, Fasheng, 1993^{c g}
- Peripsocus microcheilus Li, Fasheng, 2002^{c g}
- Peripsocus milleri (Tillyard, 1923)^{i c g}
- Peripsocus milloti Badonnel, 1969^{c g}
- Peripsocus mingshanicus Li, Fasheng, 1997^{c g}
- Peripsocus minimus Mockford, 1971^{i c g b}
- Peripsocus minutus Banks, N., 1924^{c g}
- Peripsocus mirabilis Li, Fasheng, 1995^{c g}
- Peripsocus mokotensis Badonnel, 1948^{c g}
- Peripsocus monticola Mockford, 1971^{c g}
- Peripsocus morulops (Tillyard, 1923)^{c g}
- Peripsocus mutilatus Badonnel, 1986^{c g}
- Peripsocus nanjingensis Li, Fasheng, 2002^{c g}
- Peripsocus nanus Navás, 1922^{c g}
- Peripsocus nasutus Badonnel, 1976^{c g}
- Peripsocus nebulosus Navás, 1932^{c g}
- Peripsocus neglectus Mockford, 1996^{c g}
- Peripsocus nigrescens Williner, 1949^{c g}
- Peripsocus notialis Smithers, Courtenay, 1984^{c g}
- Peripsocus nubifer Mockford, 1991^{c g}
- Peripsocus octoidentus Li, Fasheng, 2002^{c g}
- Peripsocus oculatus Enderlein, 1926^{c g}
- Peripsocus oculimacularis Li, Fasheng, 2002^{c g}
- Peripsocus odontopetalus Li, Fasheng, 2002^{c g}
- Peripsocus oligodontus Li, Fasheng, 2002^{c g}
- Peripsocus optimalis Li, Fasheng, 1997^{c g}
- Peripsocus orbiculatus Li, Fasheng, 1993^{c g}
- Peripsocus orebius Li, Fasheng, 2002^{c g}
- Peripsocus orientalis Garcia Aldrete, 1999^{c g}
- Peripsocus oxydontus Li, Fasheng, 2002^{c g}
- Peripsocus pallidus Broadhead & Alison Richards, 1980^{c g}
- Peripsocus pamae Schmidt, E. R. & New, 2008^{c g}
- Peripsocus papillatus Cole, New & Thornton, 1989^{c g}
- Peripsocus parareicherti Cole, New & Thornton, 1989^{c g}
- Peripsocus paraspinosus New & S. S. Lee, 1991^{c g}
- Peripsocus parvulus Kolbe, 1880^{c g}
- Peripsocus parvus Li, Fasheng, 1995^{c g}
- Peripsocus pauliani Badonnel, 1949^{i c g}
- Peripsocus pediformis Li, Fasheng, 2001^{c g}
- Peripsocus pembanus Enderlein, 1908^{c g}
- Peripsocus peruanus Banks, N., 1920^{c g}
- Peripsocus phacellodomi New, 1972^{c g}
- Peripsocus phaeochilus Li, Fasheng, 2002^{c g}
- Peripsocus phaeopterus (Stephens, 1836)^{i c g}
- Peripsocus pictus Thornton, 1962^{c g}
- Peripsocus placidus Mockford, 1991^{c g}
- Peripsocus plagiotropus Li, Fasheng, 2002^{c g}
- Peripsocus platyopterus Li, Fasheng, 1997^{c g}
- Peripsocus plstylpus Li, Fasheng, 1995^{c g}
- Peripsocus plurimaculatus Li, Fasheng, 1992^{c g}
- Peripsocus polygonalis Li, Fasheng, 1995^{c g}
- Peripsocus polyoacanthus Li, Fasheng, 1993^{c g}
- Peripsocus potosi Mockford, 1971^{i c g}
- Peripsocus pseudoquercicola Thornton, 1962^{c g}
- Peripsocus pumilus Enderlein, 1907^{c g}
- Peripsocus qingchengshanicus Li, Fasheng, 2002^{c g}
- Peripsocus qingdaoensis Li, Fasheng, 1993^{c g}
- Peripsocus quadratidentalis Li, Fasheng, 2002^{c g}
- Peripsocus quadratiprocessus Li, Fasheng, 1993^{c g}
- Peripsocus quadripunctatus Badonnel, 1955^{c g}
- Peripsocus quattuordecimus Li, Fasheng, 1995^{c g}
- Peripsocus quercicola Enderlein, 1906^{c g}
- Peripsocus reduncus Li, Fasheng, 2002^{c g}
- Peripsocus reflexibilis Li, Fasheng, 2002^{c g}
- Peripsocus reicherti Enderlein, 1903^{c g}
- Peripsocus rhombicus Li, Fasheng, 2002^{c g}
- Peripsocus rhomboacanthus Li, Fasheng, 2002^{c g}
- Peripsocus roseus Smithers, Courtenay, 1977^{c g}
- Peripsocus scalpratus Li, Fasheng, 2002^{c g}
- Peripsocus scapiformis Li, Fasheng, 2002^{c g}
- Peripsocus sclerotus Thornton & Wong, 1966^{c g}
- Peripsocus sedcimidentalis Li, Fasheng, 2002^{c g}
- Peripsocus sedecimidentalis Li, Fasheng, 1997^{c g}
- Peripsocus setosus Smithers, Courtenay, 1960^{c g}
- Peripsocus sexidentus Li, Fasheng, 2002^{c g}
- Peripsocus shilinensis Li, Fasheng, 2002^{c g}
- Peripsocus siculiformis Li, Fasheng, 2002^{c g}
- Peripsocus similis Enderlein, 1903^{c g}
- Peripsocus spinosus Thornton, 1959^{c g}
- Peripsocus spissospilus Li, Fasheng, 2001^{c g}
- Peripsocus stagnivagus Chapman, 1930^{i c g b}
- Peripsocus stegeri Thornton, 1990^{c g}
- Peripsocus stenopterus Thornton & Wong, 1968^{c g}
- Peripsocus stigmatus Thornton & Wong, 1968^{c g}
- Peripsocus stigmostigmus Li, Fasheng, 2002^{c g}
- Peripsocus stipiatus Li, Fasheng, 1993^{c g}
- Peripsocus subfasciatus (Rambur, 1842)^{i c g b}
- Peripsocus subtilis Li, Fasheng, 2001^{c g}
- Peripsocus subtristis Mockford, 1991^{c g}
- Peripsocus suffitus Enderlein, 1903^{c g}
- Peripsocus suoxiyuicus Li, Fasheng, 2002^{c g}
- Peripsocus sydneyensis Enderlein, 1903^{c g}
- Peripsocus taipingensis New & S. S. Lee, 1991^{c g}
- Peripsocus terricolis Badonnel, 1986^{c g}
- Peripsocus teutonicus Mockford, 1971^{c g}
- Peripsocus tillyardi New, 1973^{c g}
- Peripsocus tinctus Cole, New & Thornton, 1989^{c g}
- Peripsocus togoensis Turner, B. D. & Cheke, 1983^{c g}
- Peripsocus transivenus Li, Fasheng, 2002^{c g}
- Peripsocus tredecimus Li, Fasheng, 1997^{c g}
- Peripsocus trigonoispineus Li, Fasheng, 2002^{c g}
- Peripsocus tristis Mockford, 1991^{c g}
- Peripsocus umbrosus Navás, 1911^{c g}
- Peripsocus uncinatus New, 1977^{c g}
- Peripsocus undecimidentus Li, Fasheng, 2002^{c g}
- Peripsocus undulatus Li, Fasheng, 2002^{c g}
- Peripsocus uniformis New & Thornton, 1976^{c g}
- Peripsocus vacoasensis Turner, B. D., 1976^{c g}
- Peripsocus valvulus Thornton & Wong, 1968^{c g}
- Peripsocus variatus Soehardjan & Hamann, 1959^{c g}
- Peripsocus varidentatus Li, Fasheng, 2002^{c g}
- Peripsocus vescus Li, Fasheng, 1997^{c g}
- Peripsocus viriosus Li, Fasheng, 1995^{c g}
- Peripsocus weinigeri Turner, B. D., 1975^{c g}
- Peripsocus wuhoi Li, Fasheng, 2002^{c g}
- Peripsocus wuyishanicus Li, Fasheng, 1999^{c g}
- Peripsocus xanthochilus Li, Fasheng, 2002^{c g}
- Peripsocus xihuensis Li, Fasheng, 2002^{c g}
- Peripsocus yongi New & S. S. Lee, 1991^{c g}
- Peripsocus yuleki Galil & Halperin, 1983^{c g}
- Peripsocus zhangispineus Li, Fasheng, 2002^{c g}
- Peripsocus zhangliani Li, Fasheng, 2002^{c g}
- Peripsocus ziguiensis Li, Fasheng, 1997^{c g}

Data sources: i = ITIS, c = Catalogue of Life, g = GBIF, b = Bugguide.net
