= List of Ectopsocus species =

These 177 species belong to the genus Ectopsocus:

- Ectopsocus acutistigma Schmidt & Thornton, 1993
- Ectopsocus adelphos Thornton & Wong, 1968
- Ectopsocus aethiops (Hagen, 1859)
- Ectopsocus albiceps Smithers, 1977
- Ectopsocus aldretei Smithers, 1996
- Ectopsocus amblyura Thornton & Wong, 1968
- Ectopsocus ambulans (Lienhard, 2009)
- Ectopsocus amphithrix Thornton & Wong, 1968
- Ectopsocus andinus Saenz Manchola, González-Obando & García-Aldrete, 2014
- Ectopsocus anisodontus Li, 2002
- Ectopsocus annandalei Datta, 1969
- Ectopsocus argus Thornton & Wong, 1968
- Ectopsocus axillaris (Smithers, 1969)
- Ectopsocus baliosus Thornton & Wong, 1968
- Ectopsocus barlowi New & Lee, 1992
- Ectopsocus basalis (Banks, 1937)
- Ectopsocus bengalensis Datta, 1965
- Ectopsocus berlesii Ribaga, 1901
- Ectopsocus bicaudatus Badonnel, 1935
- Ectopsocus bifurcatus Vaughan, Thornton & New, 1991
- Ectopsocus biuncialis Li, 1995
- Ectopsocus boharti Thornton & Wong, 1968
- Ectopsocus briggsi McLachlan, 1899
- Ectopsocus brinchangensis New & Lee, 1992
- Ectopsocus brunneus (Edwards, 1950)
- Ectopsocus californicus (Banks, 1903)
- Ectopsocus cetratus Smithers, 1972
- Ectopsocus chiapensis García-Aldrete, 1991
- Ectopsocus chiapensoides García-Aldrete, 1991
- Ectopsocus cinctus Thornton, 1962
- Ectopsocus cirratus Thornton & Wong, 1968
- Ectopsocus cluniatus Vaughan, Thornton & New, 1989
- Ectopsocus coccophilus Ball, 1943
- Ectopsocus columbianus Badonnel, 1986
- Ectopsocus comitus Thornton & Wong, 1968
- Ectopsocus comptus Thornton & Wong, 1968
- Ectopsocus coronatus Smithers, 1969
- Ectopsocus coyae Schmidt & New, 2008
- Ectopsocus crinitus Thornton & Wong, 1968
- Ectopsocus cristatus Thornton & Wong, 1968
- Ectopsocus decenipunctatus Li, 1993
- Ectopsocus denervus Thornton & Wong, 1968
- Ectopsocus denotatus Thornton & Wong, 1968
- Ectopsocus denudatus Enderlein, 1903
- Ectopsocus dialeptus Thornton & Wong, 1968
- Ectopsocus dicroglossus Thornton & Wong, 1968
- Ectopsocus disjunctus Garcia Aldrete & Saenz Manchola, 2022
- Ectopsocus downesi Smithers, 1991
- Ectopsocus drepanus Thornton, 1984
- Ectopsocus edwardsi New, 1973
- Ectopsocus eertmoedi García-Aldrete, 1991
- Ectopsocus equidentus Li, 1999
- Ectopsocus erosus (Enderlein, 1903)
- Ectopsocus ewarti Vaughan, Thornton & New, 1989
- Ectopsocus exastis Smithers, 1998
- Ectopsocus fenestratus Thornton & Wong, 1968
- Ectopsocus ferrugineiceps Enderlein, 1908
- Ectopsocus flaviceps (Okamoto, 1910)
- Ectopsocus formosus García-Aldrete, 1991
- Ectopsocus fullawayi Enderlein, 1913
- Ectopsocus fumidus Thornton & Wong, 1968
- Ectopsocus furcatus Thornton & Wong, 1968
- Ectopsocus gentingensis New & Lee, 1992
- Ectopsocus gorgonaensis Saenz Manchola, González-Obando & García-Aldrete, 2014
- Ectopsocus gracilis Thornton & Wong, 1968
- Ectopsocus gradatus Thornton & Wong, 1968
- Ectopsocus graminus Schmidt & New, 2008
- Ectopsocus gyroancistrus Li, 2002
- Ectopsocus halcrowi Pearman, 1960
- Ectopsocus hartleyi Smithers, 1996
- Ectopsocus hawaiensis Enderlein, 1913
- Ectopsocus heurni (Navas, 1924)
- Ectopsocus hickmani Schmidt & New, 2008
- Ectopsocus himalayanus New, 1971
- Ectopsocus hirsutus Thornton, 1962
- Ectopsocus hypandrus Thornton, 1984
- Ectopsocus ignotus Thornton & Wong, 1968
- Ectopsocus inclinans Li, 2002
- Ectopsocus innotatus Thornton & Wong, 1968
- Ectopsocus inornatus Smithers & Thornton, 1974
- Ectopsocus insularis Smithers & Thornton, 1974
- Ectopsocus intersitus Thornton & Wong, 1968
- Ectopsocus isodentus Li, 1997
- Ectopsocus kepongensis New & Lee, 1992
- Ectopsocus lambus Thornton, 1981
- Ectopsocus leteusistrius Li, 2002
- Ectopsocus longisetosus Broadhead & Richards, 1980
- Ectopsocus longitudinalis Li, 2002
- Ectopsocus lubensis Baz, 1990
- Ectopsocus luridus Badonnel, 1969
- Ectopsocus machadoi Badonnel, 1955
- Ectopsocus macrotaenious Li, 2002
- Ectopsocus maculatus Smithers, 1964
- Ectopsocus maculosus Turner & Cheke, 1983
- Ectopsocus maindroni Badonnel, 1935
- Ectopsocus marginatus Thornton & Wong, 1968
- Ectopsocus meridionalis Ribaga, 1904
- Ectopsocus mexicanus García-Aldrete, 1991
- Ectopsocus mirus Badonnel, 1967
- Ectopsocus musae (Kunstler & Chaine, 1902)
- Ectopsocus myrmecophilus (Enderlein, 1903)
- Ectopsocus nerens (Hickman, 1934)
- Ectopsocus nidicolus Thornton & Wong, 1968
- Ectopsocus nyingchiensis Li, 2002
- Ectopsocus obscurus García-Aldrete, 1991
- Ectopsocus ornatoides Thornton & Wong, 1968
- Ectopsocus ornatus Thornton, 1962
- Ectopsocus pacificus García-Aldrete, 1991
- Ectopsocus paraplesius Thornton & Wong, 1968
- Ectopsocus parmatus Smithers, 1977
- Ectopsocus pauliani Badonnel, 1967
- Ectopsocus pearmani Ball, 1943
- Ectopsocus pectinatus Smithers, 1964
- Ectopsocus perkinsi Banks, 1931
- Ectopsocus perplexus Smithers, 1977
- Ectopsocus petersi Smithers, 1978 (Peters' barklouse)
- Ectopsocus pictus Mockford, 1974
- Ectopsocus piger (Hagen, 1859)
- Ectopsocus pilosoides Smithers, 1972
- Ectopsocus pilosus Badonnel, 1967
- Ectopsocus predanus Vaughan, Thornton & New, 1989
- Ectopsocus proctus New & Lee, 1992
- Ectopsocus pseudosalpinx Li, 1993
- Ectopsocus psychodelicus Turner, 1975
- Ectopsocus pteridii Smithers, 1977
- Ectopsocus pumilis (Banks, 1920)
- Ectopsocus punctatus Thornton & Wong, 1968
- Ectopsocus quadratiapicius Li, 2002
- Ectopsocus quadrisetus Li, 2002
- Ectopsocus ramburi Datta, 1965
- Ectopsocus ribagai Enderlein, 1906
- Ectopsocus richardsi (Pearman, 1929)
- Ectopsocus ridderi Vaughan, Thornton & New, 1989
- Ectopsocus rileyae Schmidt & Thornton, 1993
- Ectopsocus risdonensis Schmidt & New, 2008
- Ectopsocus russulus Smithers, 1977
- Ectopsocus salpinx Thornton & Wong, 1968
- Ectopsocus separatus Thornton & Wong, 1968
- Ectopsocus setulosus Li, 1997
- Ectopsocus similis Badonnel, 1955
- Ectopsocus speciosus Thornton & Wong, 1968
- Ectopsocus spiculatus New, 1973
- Ectopsocus spilocephalus Li, 1993
- Ectopsocus spilotus Thornton & Wong, 1968
- Ectopsocus sprenti Schmidt & New, 2008
- Ectopsocus stictus Thornton & Wong, 1968
- Ectopsocus strauchi Enderlein, 1906
- Ectopsocus striatellus Navas, 1931
- Ectopsocus strictifoliatus Li, 2002
- Ectopsocus sumatrensis New, Adis, Morais & Gomes Rodrigues, 1991
- Ectopsocus tenellus Thornton & Wong, 1968
- Ectopsocus thibaudi Badonnel, 1979
- Ectopsocus thoi New & Lee, 1992
- Ectopsocus thorntoni García-Aldrete, 1991
- Ectopsocus thysanus Thornton & Wong, 1968
- Ectopsocus tinctus Navas, 1924
- Ectopsocus titschacki Jentsch, 1939
- Ectopsocus triangulus Thornton & Wong, 1968
- Ectopsocus tuxtlarum García-Aldrete, 1991
- Ectopsocus uncinatus Thornton & Wong, 1968
- Ectopsocus unipunctatus Smithers, 1991
- Ectopsocus vachoni Badonnel, 1945
- Ectopsocus vacuus New & Lee, 1992
- Ectopsocus valvilobatus Saenz Manchola, González-Obando & García-Aldrete, 2014
- Ectopsocus vannus Thornton & Wong, 1968
- Ectopsocus variabilis Badonnel
- Ectopsocus venosus Lienhard, 2002
- Ectopsocus veracruzensis García-Aldrete, 1991
- Ectopsocus vilhenai Badonnel, 1955
- Ectopsocus vilhenaioides Saenz Manchola, González-Obando & García-Aldrete, 2014
- Ectopsocus villosus Thornton & Wong, 1968
- Ectopsocus vishnyakovae Schmidt, 1992
- Ectopsocus waterstradti (Enderlein, 1901)
- Ectopsocus yongi New & Lee, 1992
- Ectopsocus yucatanus García-Aldrete, 1991
- Ectopsocus zayuensis Li, 2002
- Ectopsocus zimmermani Thornton & Wong, 1968
