= Kaestneriella fumosa =

Scientific classification
- Domain: Eukaryota
- Kingdom: Animalia
- Phylum: Arthropoda
- Class: Insecta
- Order: Psocodea
- Family: Peripsocidae
- Genus: Kaestneriella
- Species: K. fumosa

Binomial name
- Kaestneriella fumosa (Banks, 1903)

Species of booklouse

Kaestneriella fumosa is a species of stout barklouse in the family Peripsocidae. It is found in North America.
