= Mesopsocus helveticus =

Scientific classification
- Kingdom: Animalia
- Phylum: Arthropoda
- Clade: Pancrustacea
- Class: Insecta
- Order: Psocodea
- Family: Mesopsocidae
- Genus: Mesopsocus
- Species: M. helveticus

Binomial name
- Mesopsocus helveticus Lienhard, 1977

Species of booklouse

Mesopsocus helveticus is a species of Psocoptera from the Mesopsocidae family that can be found in Austria, Hungary, and Switzerland.
