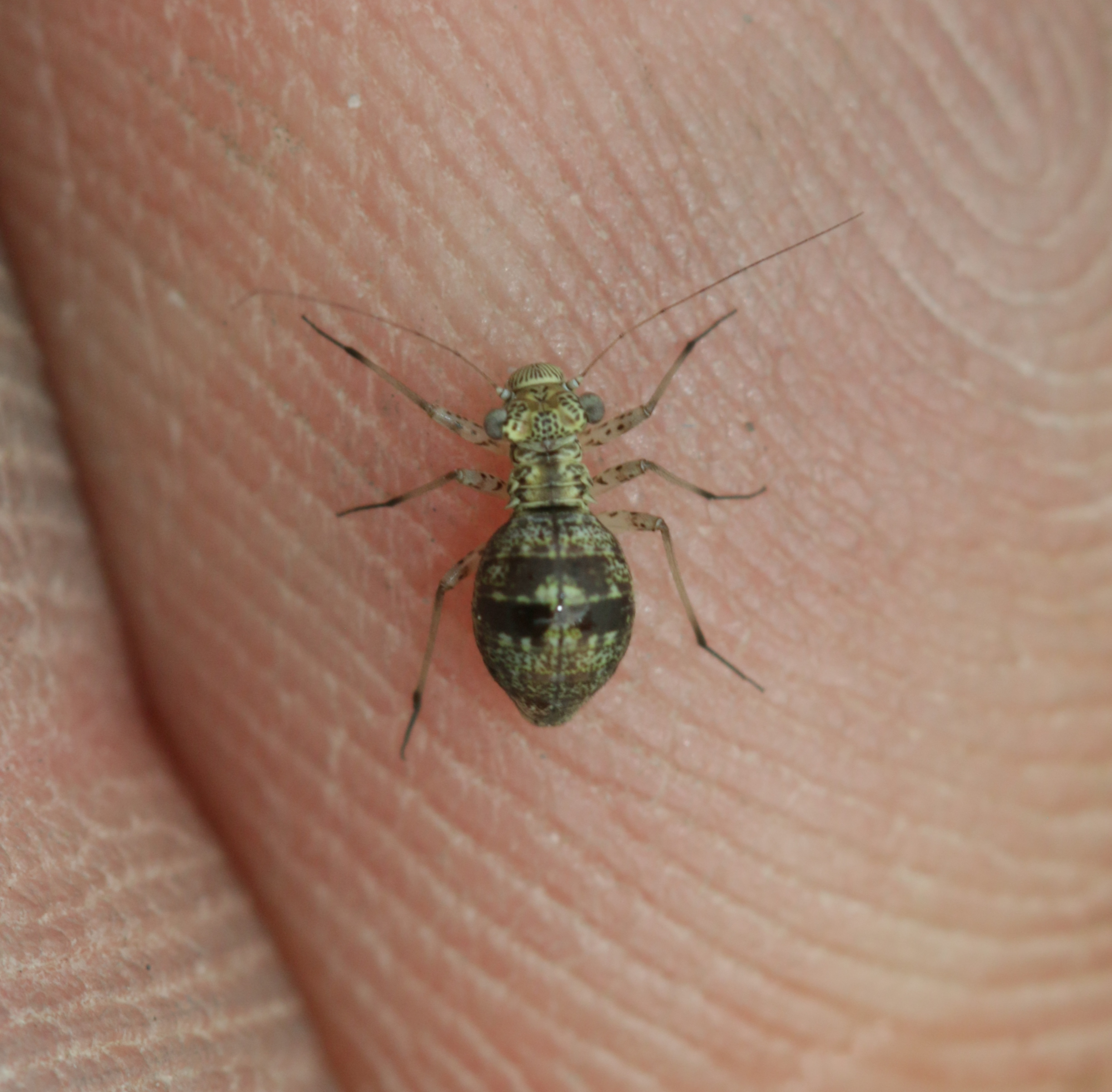

Scientific classification
- Kingdom: Animalia
- Phylum: Arthropoda
- Clade: Pancrustacea
- Class: Insecta
- Order: Psocodea
- Family: Mesopsocidae
- Genus: Mesopsocus
- Species: M. immunis

Binomial name
- Mesopsocus immunis (Stephens, 1836)

= Mesopsocus immunis =

Species of booklouse

Mesopsocus immunis is a species of Psocoptera from the Mesopsocidae family that can be found throughout Western Europe (except for Denmark and Iceland), and Hungary.

This species of the genus Mesopsocus are a moderately large species of Psocodea, with the females ranging from 4mm to 4.5mm while males range from 4.5mm to 5.5mm. Females may appear apterous, but in fact have tiny wings (micropterous), while males have long wings (macropterous).
