= Mesopsocus unipunctatus =

Scientific classification
- Kingdom: Animalia
- Phylum: Arthropoda
- Clade: Pancrustacea
- Class: Insecta
- Order: Psocodea
- Family: Mesopsocidae
- Genus: Mesopsocus
- Species: M. unipunctatus

Binomial name
- Mesopsocus unipunctatus (Mueller, 1764)

Species of booklouse

Mesopsocus unipunctatus is a species of barklouse found across the Holarctic. It is a member of the Mesopsocidae family. It is a generalist that occurs on branches of deciduous and coniferous trees, as well as lower hedgerows and shaded meadows.

== Description ==
This species has one or two noticeable transverse stripes across the abdomen and is often greyish or light. The rest of the body is erratically mottled with dark markings. It is flightless and the antennae are almost twice the body length. The body length ranges from 2.5-3.7mm.

== Range ==
This species occurs frequently in Great Britain and Ireland. It can also be found in Bulgaria, Hungary, Latvia, Poland, Romania, and Western Europe (except Greece).

Some populations also exist in North America, where it occurs throughout Canada and the United States.

== Habitat ==
The species feeds on a wide range of trees including eudicots such as ash, beech, birch, gorse, hawthorn, oak, and sycamore, and conifers such as cedar, juniper, pine, and yew.

It is one of the species where industrial melanism has been demonstrated.
