= Peripsocus phaeopterus =

Scientific classification
- Domain: Eukaryota
- Kingdom: Animalia
- Phylum: Arthropoda
- Class: Insecta
- Order: Psocodea
- Family: Peripsocidae
- Genus: Peripsocus
- Species: P. phaeopterus

Binomial name
- Peripsocus phaeopterus (Stephens, 1836)

Species of booklouse

Peripsocus phaeopterus is a species of Psocoptera from the Peripsocidae family that can be found in Great Britain and Ireland. The species are black coloured.

== Habitat ==
The species feed on Alnus incana, beech, birch, broom, elm, hawthorn, hazel, hornbeam, larch, oak, pine, sea buckthorn, and yew. It also likes to feed on lime.
