= Ectopsocus axillaris =

Scientific classification
- Domain: Eukaryota
- Kingdom: Animalia
- Phylum: Arthropoda
- Class: Insecta
- Order: Psocodea
- Family: Ectopsocidae
- Genus: Ectopsocus
- Species: E. axillaris

Binomial name
- Ectopsocus axillaris (Smithers, 1969)

Species of booklouse

Ectopsocus axillaris is a species of Psocoptera from the Ectopsocidae family that can be found in Great Britain and Ireland. The species are brownish-black coloured and is similar to Bertkauia lucifuga.

== Habitat ==
The species feed on beech, cherry laurel, Chinese juniper, elder, hawthorn and oak. They also feed on abandoned wasp nests that can be seen from bracket fungus.
