= Peripsocus madescens =

Scientific classification
- Domain: Eukaryota
- Kingdom: Animalia
- Phylum: Arthropoda
- Class: Insecta
- Order: Psocodea
- Family: Peripsocidae
- Genus: Peripsocus
- Species: P. madescens

Binomial name
- Peripsocus madescens (Walsh, 1863)

Species of booklouse

Peripsocus madescens is a species of stout barklouse in the family Peripsocidae. It is found in Central America and North America.
