= Peripsocus alachuae =

Scientific classification
- Domain: Eukaryota
- Kingdom: Animalia
- Phylum: Arthropoda
- Class: Insecta
- Order: Psocodea
- Family: Peripsocidae
- Genus: Peripsocus
- Species: P. alachuae

Binomial name
- Peripsocus alachuae Mockford, 1971

Species of booklouse

Peripsocus alachuae is a species of stout barklouse in the family Peripsocidae. It is found in North America.
