= Peripsocus alboguttatus =

Scientific classification
- Domain: Eukaryota
- Kingdom: Animalia
- Phylum: Arthropoda
- Class: Insecta
- Order: Psocodea
- Family: Peripsocidae
- Genus: Peripsocus
- Species: P. alboguttatus

Binomial name
- Peripsocus alboguttatus (Dalman, 1823)

Species of booklouse

Peripsocus alboguttatus is a species of Psocoptera from the Peripsocidae family that can be found in Austria, Belgium, Croatia, Denmark, Finland, France, Germany, Great Britain, Greece, Hungary, Ireland, Italy, Latvia, Luxembourg, Madeira, Norway, Poland, Romania, Spain, Sweden, Switzerland, and the Netherlands. The species are brown coloured.
