= Ectopsocopsis cryptomeriae =

Scientific classification
- Kingdom: Animalia
- Phylum: Arthropoda
- Clade: Pancrustacea
- Class: Insecta
- Order: Psocodea
- Family: Ectopsocidae
- Genus: Ectopsocopsis
- Species: E. cryptomeriae

Binomial name
- Ectopsocopsis cryptomeriae (Enderlein, 1907)

Species of booklouse

Ectopsocopsis cryptomeriae, the large-winged psocid, is a species of outer barklouse in the family Ectopsocidae. It is found in the Caribbean, Europe and Northern Asia (excluding China), Central America, North America, Oceania, South America, and Southern Asia.
