= Mesopsocus fuscifrons =

Scientific classification
- Domain: Eukaryota
- Kingdom: Animalia
- Phylum: Arthropoda
- Class: Insecta
- Order: Psocodea
- Family: Mesopsocidae
- Genus: Mesopsocus
- Species: M. fuscifrons

Binomial name
- Mesopsocus fuscifrons Meinander, 1966

Species of booklouse

Mesopsocus fuscifrons is a species of Psocoptera from the Mesopsocidae family that can be found in North Macedonia and Kaliningrad, Russia.
