= Peripsocus madidus =

Scientific classification
- Domain: Eukaryota
- Kingdom: Animalia
- Phylum: Arthropoda
- Class: Insecta
- Order: Psocodea
- Family: Peripsocidae
- Genus: Peripsocus
- Species: P. madidus

Binomial name
- Peripsocus madidus (Hagen, 1861)

Species of booklouse

Peripsocus madidus is a species of stout barklouse in the family Peripsocidae occurring in Central America and North America.
