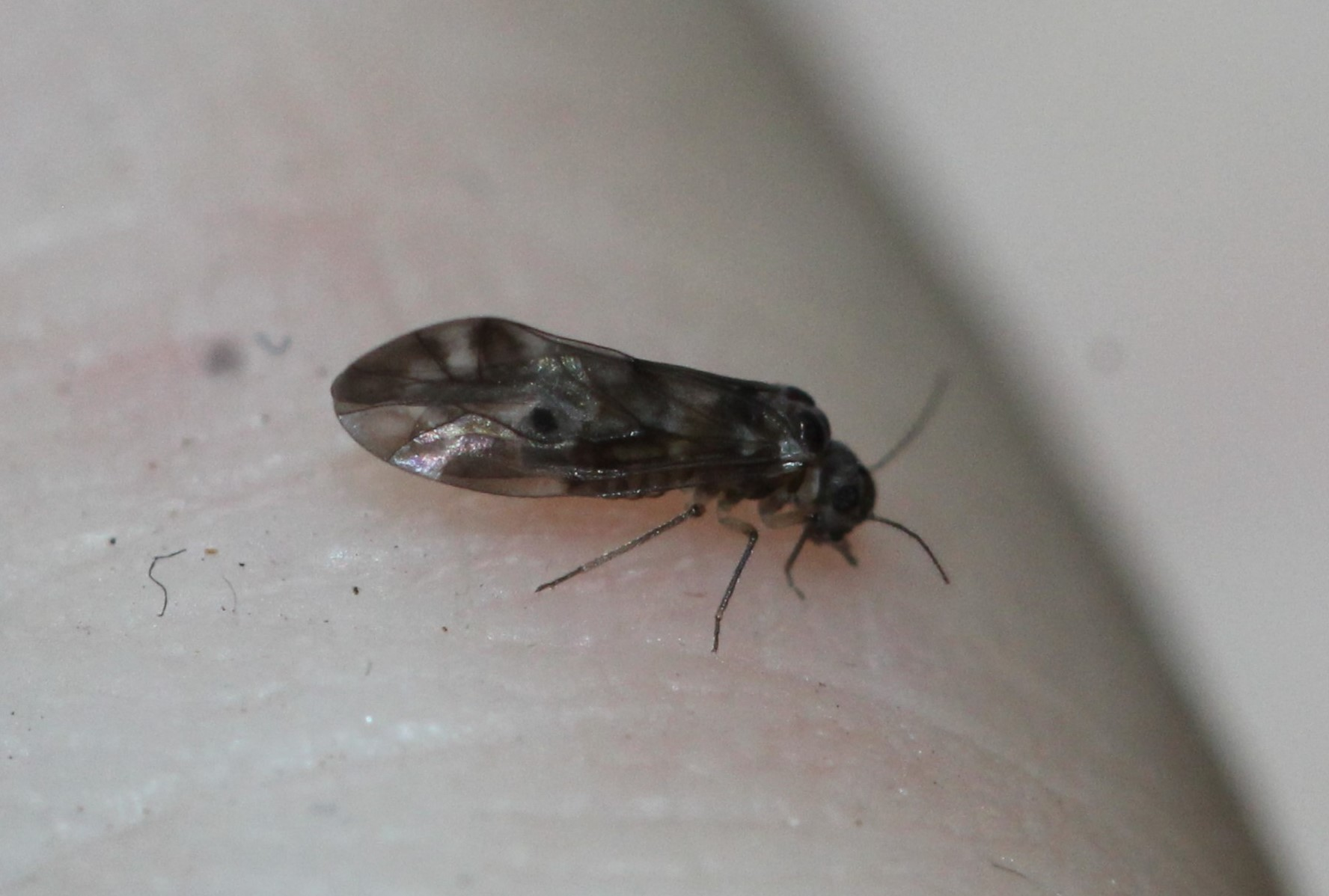

Scientific classification
- Domain: Eukaryota
- Kingdom: Animalia
- Phylum: Arthropoda
- Class: Insecta
- Order: Psocodea
- Family: Peripsocidae
- Genus: Peripsocus
- Species: P. subfasciatus

Binomial name
- Peripsocus subfasciatus (Rambur, 1842)

= Peripsocus subfasciatus =

Species of booklouse

Peripsocus subfasciatus is a species of Psocoptera from the Peripsocidae family that can be found in Great Britain and Ireland. The species are either black or brown coloured.

== Habitat ==
The species feed on beech, blackthorn, broom, cedar, Chinese juniper, elder, elm, hawthorn, larch, oak, pine, sallow, sea buckthorn. It also likes to feed on apples, rowan, and sweet chestnuts.
