= Mesopsocus laticeps =

Scientific classification
- Domain: Eukaryota
- Kingdom: Animalia
- Phylum: Arthropoda
- Class: Insecta
- Order: Psocodea
- Family: Mesopsocidae
- Genus: Mesopsocus
- Species: M. laticeps

Binomial name
- Mesopsocus laticeps (Kolbe, 1880)

Species of booklouse

Mesopsocus laticeps is a species of middle barklouse in the family Mesopsocidae. It is found in Europe and Northern Asia (excluding China), North America, and Southern Asia.
