= Mesopsocus duboscqui =

Scientific classification
- Domain: Eukaryota
- Kingdom: Animalia
- Phylum: Arthropoda
- Class: Insecta
- Order: Psocodea
- Family: Mesopsocidae
- Genus: Mesopsocus
- Species: M. duboscqui

Binomial name
- Mesopsocus duboscqui Badonnel, 1938

Species of booklouse

Mesopsocus duboscqui is a species of Psocoptera from the Mesopsocidae family that can be found in Cyprus, France, Greece, Italy, Slovenia, and Spain.
