= Bertkauia lepicidinaria =

Scientific classification
- Domain: Eukaryota
- Kingdom: Animalia
- Phylum: Arthropoda
- Class: Insecta
- Order: Psocodea
- Family: Epipsocidae
- Genus: Bertkauia
- Species: B. lepicidinaria

Binomial name
- Bertkauia lepicidinaria Chapman, 1930

Species of booklouse

Bertkauia lepicidinaria is a species of elliptical barklouse in the family Epipsocidae. It is found in North America.
