= Peripsocus stagnivagus =

Scientific classification
- Kingdom: Animalia
- Phylum: Arthropoda
- Clade: Pancrustacea
- Class: Insecta
- Order: Psocodea
- Family: Peripsocidae
- Genus: Peripsocus
- Species: P. stagnivagus

Binomial name
- Peripsocus stagnivagus Chapman, 1930

Synonyms
- Peripsocus bivari

Species of booklouse

Peripsocus stagnivagus is a species of stout barklouse in the family Peripsocidae. It is found in the Caribbean, Central America, North America, and South America.
