= Bertkauia crosbyana =

Scientific classification
- Domain: Eukaryota
- Kingdom: Animalia
- Phylum: Arthropoda
- Class: Insecta
- Order: Psocodea
- Family: Epipsocidae
- Genus: Bertkauia
- Species: B. crosbyana

Binomial name
- Bertkauia crosbyana Chapman, 1930

Species of booklouse

Bertkauia crosbyana is a species of elliptical barklouse in the family Epipsocidae. It is found in Central America and North America.
