= Peripsocus didymus =

Scientific classification
- Domain: Eukaryota
- Kingdom: Animalia
- Phylum: Arthropoda
- Class: Insecta
- Order: Psocodea
- Family: Peripsocidae
- Genus: Peripsocus
- Species: P. didymus

Binomial name
- Peripsocus didymus Roesler, 1939

Species of booklouse

Peripsocus didymus is a species of Psocoptera from the Peripsocidae family that can be found in Great Britain and Ireland. It can also be found in Austria, Belgium, Finland, France, Germany, Hungary, Italy, Luxembourg, Norway, Poland, Romania, Spain, Sweden, Switzerland, and the Netherlands. The species are brown coloured.

== Habitat ==
The species feed on beech, bird cherry, blackthorn, broom, elder, hawthorn, ivy, larch, laurel, oak, pine, spruce, sycamore, and yew. It also likes to feed on lime.
