= Mesopsocus blancae =

Scientific classification
- Domain: Eukaryota
- Kingdom: Animalia
- Phylum: Arthropoda
- Class: Insecta
- Order: Psocodea
- Family: Mesopsocidae
- Genus: Mesopsocus
- Species: M. blancae

Binomial name
- Mesopsocus blancae (Baz, 1988)

Species of booklouse

Mesopsocus blancae is a species of Psocoptera from the Mesopsocidae family that is endemic to Spain.
