= Ectopsocus meridionalis =

Scientific classification
- Kingdom: Animalia
- Phylum: Arthropoda
- Class: Insecta
- Order: Psocodea
- Family: Ectopsocidae
- Genus: Ectopsocus
- Species: E. meridionalis

Binomial name
- Ectopsocus meridionalis Ribaga, 1904

Species of booklouse

Ectopsocus meridionalis is a species of outer barklouse in the family Ectopsocidae. It is found in Africa, the Caribbean, Europe and Northern Asia (excluding China), Central America, North America, Oceania, South America, and Southern Asia.
