= Mesopsocus graecus =

Scientific classification
- Kingdom: Animalia
- Phylum: Arthropoda
- Clade: Pancrustacea
- Class: Insecta
- Order: Psocodea
- Family: Mesopsocidae
- Genus: Mesopsocus
- Species: M. graecus

Binomial name
- Mesopsocus graecus Lienhard, 1981

Species of booklouse

Mesopsocus graecus is a species of Psocoptera from the Mesopsocidae family that can be found in Cyprus, Greece, and North Aegean islands.
