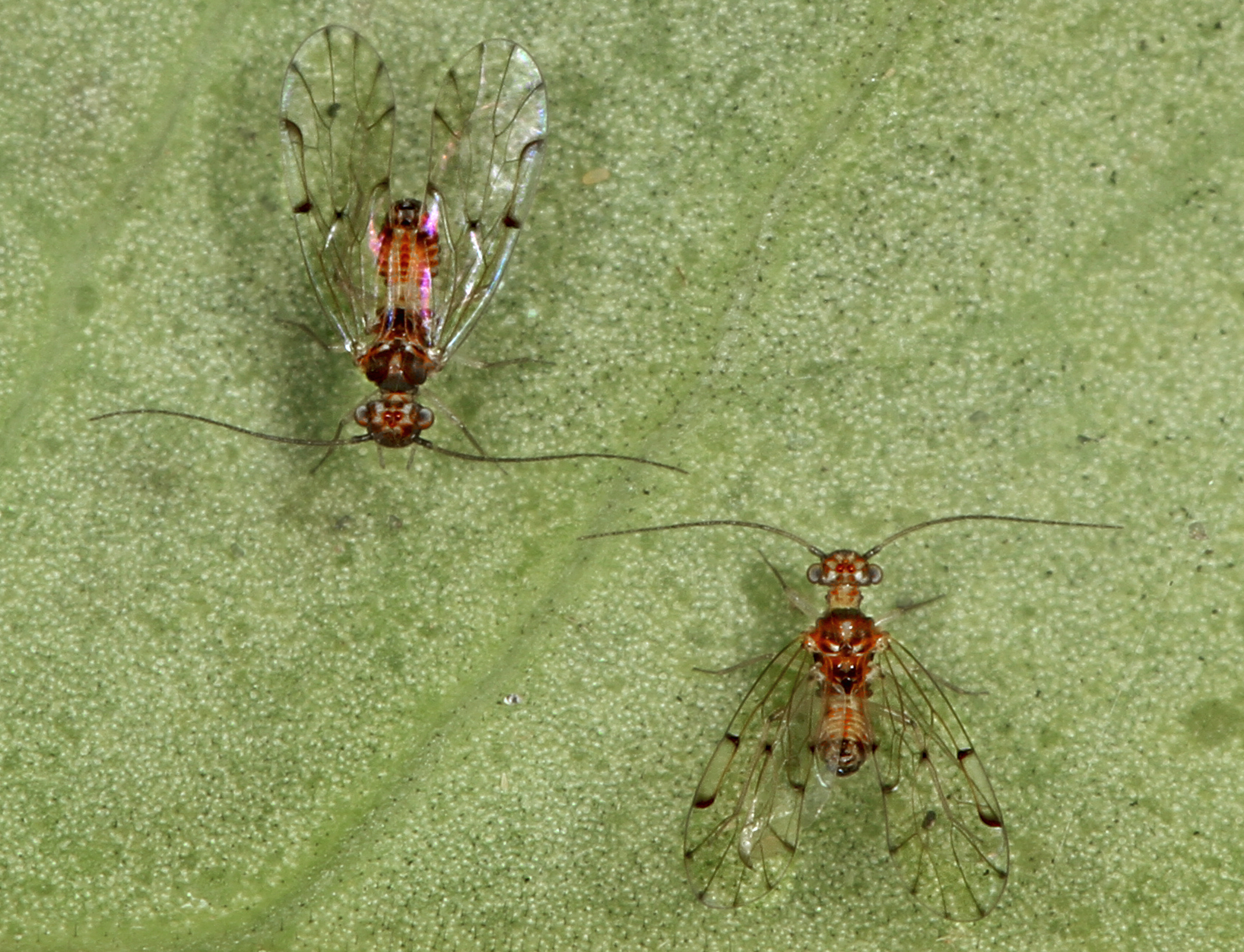
- Ectopsocus californicus

Scientific classification
- Kingdom: Animalia
- Phylum: Arthropoda
- Clade: Pancrustacea
- Class: Insecta
- Order: Psocodea
- Suborder: Psocomorpha
- Infraorder: Homilopsocidea

Families
- Ectopsocidae; Elipsocidae; Lachesillidae; Lesneiidae; Mesopsocidae; Peripsocidae; Sabulopsocidae

Synonyms
- Homilopsocetae

= Homilopsocidea =

Group of booklice

Homilopscocidea is an infraorder of Psocodea (formerly Psocoptera). It is likely a paraphyletic group, still in use for lack of a better solution. There are about 7 families and more than 1,200 described species in Homilopsocidea.

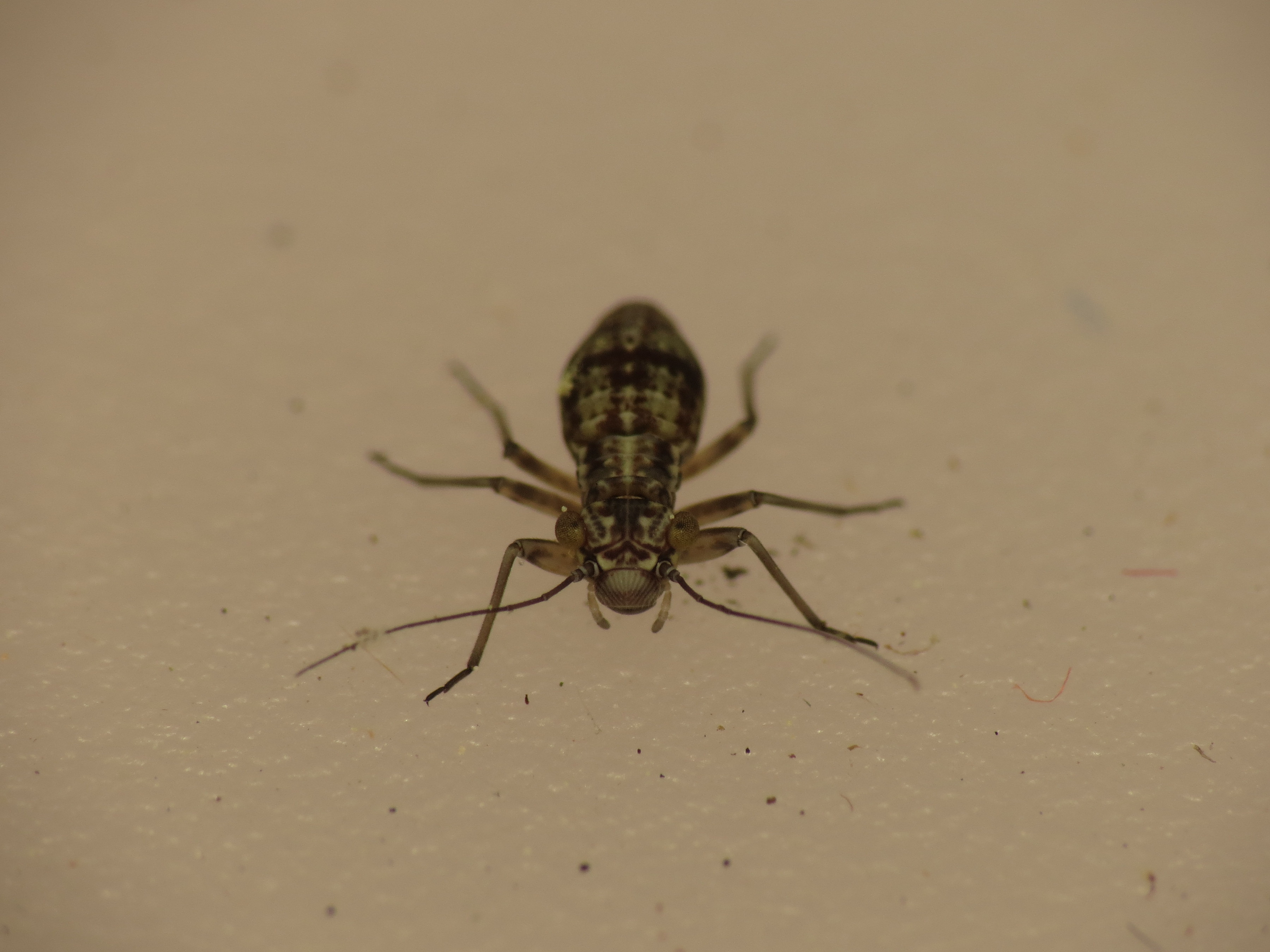
Mesopsocus

== Families ==
These seven families belong to the infraorder Homilopsocidea:

- Ectopsocidae Roesler, 1944 (outer barklice)
- Elipsocidae Pearman, 1936 (damp barklice)
- Lachesillidae Pearman, 1936 (fateful barklice)
- Lesneiidae Schmidt & New, 2004
- Mesopsocidae Pearman, 1936 (middle barklice)
- Peripsocidae Roesler, 1944 (stout barklice)
- Sabulopsocidae Schmidt & New, 2004

== Sources ==
- Lienhard, C. & Smithers, C. N. 2002. Psocoptera (Insecta): World Catalogue and Bibliography. Instrumenta Biodiversitatis, vol. 5. Muséum d'histoire naturelle, Genève.
