= Peripsocus consobrinus =

Scientific classification
- Domain: Eukaryota
- Kingdom: Animalia
- Phylum: Arthropoda
- Class: Insecta
- Order: Psocodea
- Family: Peripsocidae
- Genus: Peripsocus
- Species: P. consobrinus

Binomial name
- Peripsocus consobrinus Pearman, 1951

Species of booklouse

Peripsocus consobrinus is a species of Psocoptera from the Peripsocidae family. It is known from the type locality in Somerset, Britain I. and Scotland. The species is 3.5 millimetres (0.14 in) long with dark forewings.
