= Kaestneriella =

Scientific classification
- Domain: Eukaryota
- Kingdom: Animalia
- Phylum: Arthropoda
- Class: Insecta
- Order: Psocodea
- Family: Peripsocidae
- Genus: Kaestneriella; Roesler, 1943

Genus of booklice

Kaestneriella is a genus of stout barklice in the family Peripsocidae. There are about 13 described species in Kaestneriella.

== Species ==
These 13 species belong to the genus Kaestneriella:

- Kaestneriella ecuatoriana Garcia Aldrete, 1989
- Kaestneriella fumosa (Banks, 1903)
- Kaestneriella guatemalensis Mockford & Wong, 1969
- Kaestneriella maculosa Mockford & Wong, 1969
- Kaestneriella mexicana Mockford & Wong, 1969
- Kaestneriella minor Mockford & Wong, 1969
- Kaestneriella obscura Mockford & Wong, 1969
- Kaestneriella occidentalis Mockford & Wong, 1969
- Kaestneriella pacifica Mockford & Wong, 1969
- Kaestneriella pilosa Roesler, 1943
- Kaestneriella setosa Mockford & Wong, 1969
- Kaestneriella similis Badonnel, 1986
- Kaestneriella tenebrosa Mockford & Sullivan, 1990
