= Dicropsocus =

Scientific classification
- Domain: Eukaryota
- Kingdom: Animalia
- Phylum: Arthropoda
- Class: Insecta
- Order: Psocodea
- Family: Epipsocidae
- Genus: Dicropsocus; Smithers & Thornton, 1977

Genus of booklice

Dicropsocus is a genus in the Epipsocidae family, with three described species, all endemic to New Guinea and the neighbouring islands. The genus is characterised by a peculiar wing venation, with many supernumerary cells.
