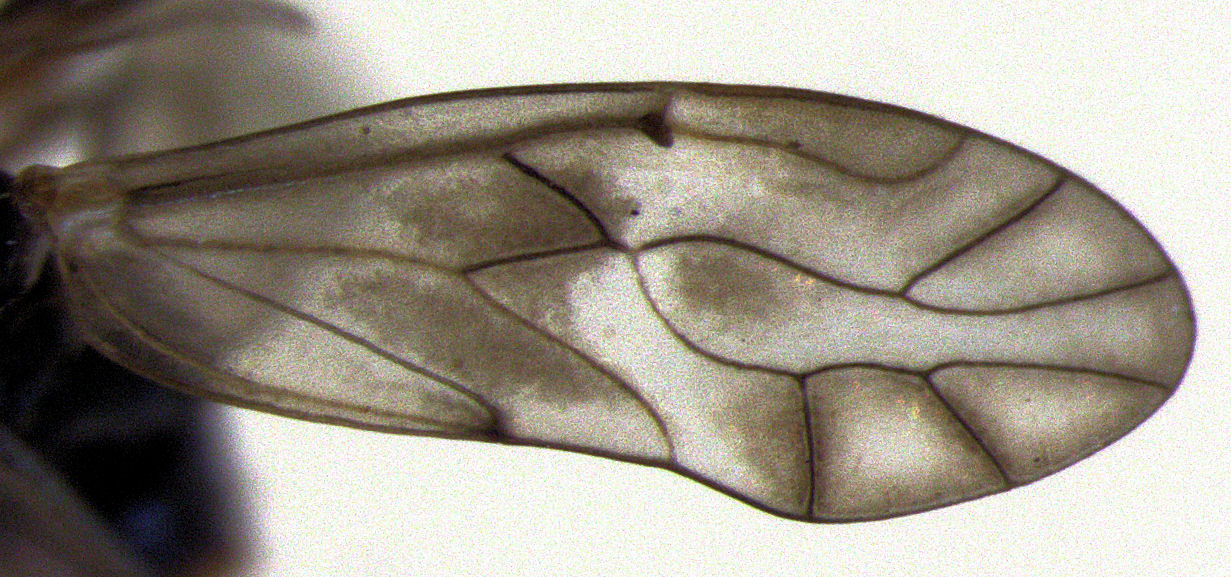

Scientific classification
- Domain: Eukaryota
- Kingdom: Animalia
- Phylum: Arthropoda
- Class: Insecta
- Order: Psocodea
- Family: Peripsocidae
- Genus: Peripsocus
- Species: P. milleri

Binomial name
- Peripsocus milleri (Tillyard, 1923)

= Peripsocus milleri =

Species of booklouse

Peripsocus milleri is a species of Psocoptera from the Peripsocidae family that can be found in Great Britain and Ireland. They can also be found on Azores and Canary Islands, Belgium, Croatia, France, Italy, and Spain. The species are brown coloured.

== Habitat ==
The species feed om oaks.
