= Sabulopsocidae =

Scientific classification
- Kingdom: Animalia
- Phylum: Arthropoda
- Clade: Pancrustacea
- Class: Insecta
- Order: Psocodea
- Suborder: Psocomorpha
- Infraorder: Homilopsocidea
- Family: Sabulopsocidae; Schmidt & New, 2004

Family of booklice

Sabulopsocidae is a family of lice in the order Psocodea. There are at least two genera and two described species in Sabulopsocidae.

== Genera ==
These two genera belong to the family Sabulopsocidae:

- Moapsocus Schmidt & New, 2004
- Sabulopsocus Smithers, 1969
