= Bertkauia =

Scientific classification
- Domain: Eukaryota
- Kingdom: Animalia
- Phylum: Arthropoda
- Class: Insecta
- Order: Psocodea
- Family: Epipsocidae
- Genus: Bertkauia; Kolbe, 1882

Genus of booklice

Bertkauia is a genus of insects in the family Epipsocidae. There are at least 2 described species in Bertkauia.

== Species ==
- Bertkauia crosbyana Chapman, 1930
- Bertkauia lepicidinaria Chapman, 1930
- Bertkauia lucifuga (Rambur, 1842)
