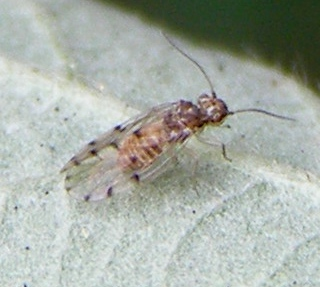

Scientific classification
- Domain: Eukaryota
- Kingdom: Animalia
- Phylum: Arthropoda
- Class: Insecta
- Order: Psocodea
- Family: Ectopsocidae
- Genus: Ectopsocus
- Species: E. petersi

Binomial name
- Ectopsocus petersi Smithers, 1978

= Ectopsocus petersi =

Species of booklouse

Ectopsocus petersi is a species of Psocoptera from the Ectopsocidae family that can be found in Great Britain and Ireland. The species are brownish-orange coloured and is similar to Ectopsocus briggsi.

== Habitat ==
The species feed on trees such as:

- Alder
- ash
- Beech
- Birch
- Bird cherry
- Blackthorn
- Cherry laurel
- Chinese juniper
- Elm
- hawthorn
- Hazel
- Hebe
- Ivy
- Juniper
- Larch
- Pine
- Privet
- Oak
- Sallow
- Spruce
- Sycamore
- Sea-buckthorn
- Willow

They also feed on fruits such as apple, bramble, horse chestnut, laurel, lime, pear, and rowan. The species also don't mind to feed on plants such as rhododendron, bracket fungus and leaf litter. They are also hungry for Buxus, Chrysanthemum, and Dianthus species of plants on which they feed while flying in England.
