= Ectopsocopsis =

Scientific classification
- Domain: Eukaryota
- Kingdom: Animalia
- Phylum: Arthropoda
- Class: Insecta
- Order: Psocodea
- Family: Ectopsocidae
- Genus: Ectopsocopsis; Badonnel, 1955

Genus of booklice

Ectopsocopsis is a genus of outer barklice in the family Ectopsocidae. There are more than 30 described species in Ectopsocopsis.

== Species ==
These 36 species belong to the genus Ectopsocopsis:

- Ectopsocopsis annulata Badonnel, 1955
- Ectopsocopsis anura Badonnel, 1955
- Ectopsocopsis badonneli (Ball, 1943)
- Ectopsocopsis baidichengensis Li, 1997
- Ectopsocopsis balli (Badonnel, 1949)
- Ectopsocopsis beijingensis Li, 2002
- Ectopsocopsis biporosa Li, 1992
- Ectopsocopsis biunciata Li, 2002
- Ectopsocopsis brevimanubria Li, 2002
- Ectopsocopsis bulbiapicia Li, 2002
- Ectopsocopsis clavellata Li, 2002
- Ectopsocopsis cognata Thornton & Wong, 1968
- Ectopsocopsis corbiformis Li, 1993
- Ectopsocopsis crassiuncata Li, 1997
- Ectopsocopsis cryptomeriae (Enderlein, 1907) (large-winged psocid)
- Ectopsocopsis curtinervis Li, 2002
- Ectopsocopsis daqingshanensis Li, 2002
- Ectopsocopsis decorata (Thornton & Wong, 1968)
- Ectopsocopsis flavipedia Li, 2002
- Ectopsocopsis gannanensis Li, 2002
- Ectopsocopsis granulosa Badonnel, 1969
- Ectopsocopsis guangdongensis Li, 1991
- Ectopsocopsis jiangxiensis Li, 2002
- Ectopsocopsis lunai Badonnel, 1969
- Ectopsocopsis luteolicapita Li, 2002
- Ectopsocopsis mozambica (Badonnel, 1931)
- Ectopsocopsis phaeostictoa Li, 2002
- Ectopsocopsis pinisuga Li, 2002
- Ectopsocopsis sarmentiformis Li, 2002
- Ectopsocopsis septentrionalis Li, 2002
- Ectopsocopsis spathulata (Ball, 1943)
- Ectopsocopsis spatiosimanubra Li, 1999
- Ectopsocopsis tenuimanubria Li, 2002
- Ectopsocopsis terricolis Badonnel, 1955
- Ectopsocopsis trimaculata Li, 2002
- Ectopsocopsis xerophylla Vishnyakova, 1970
