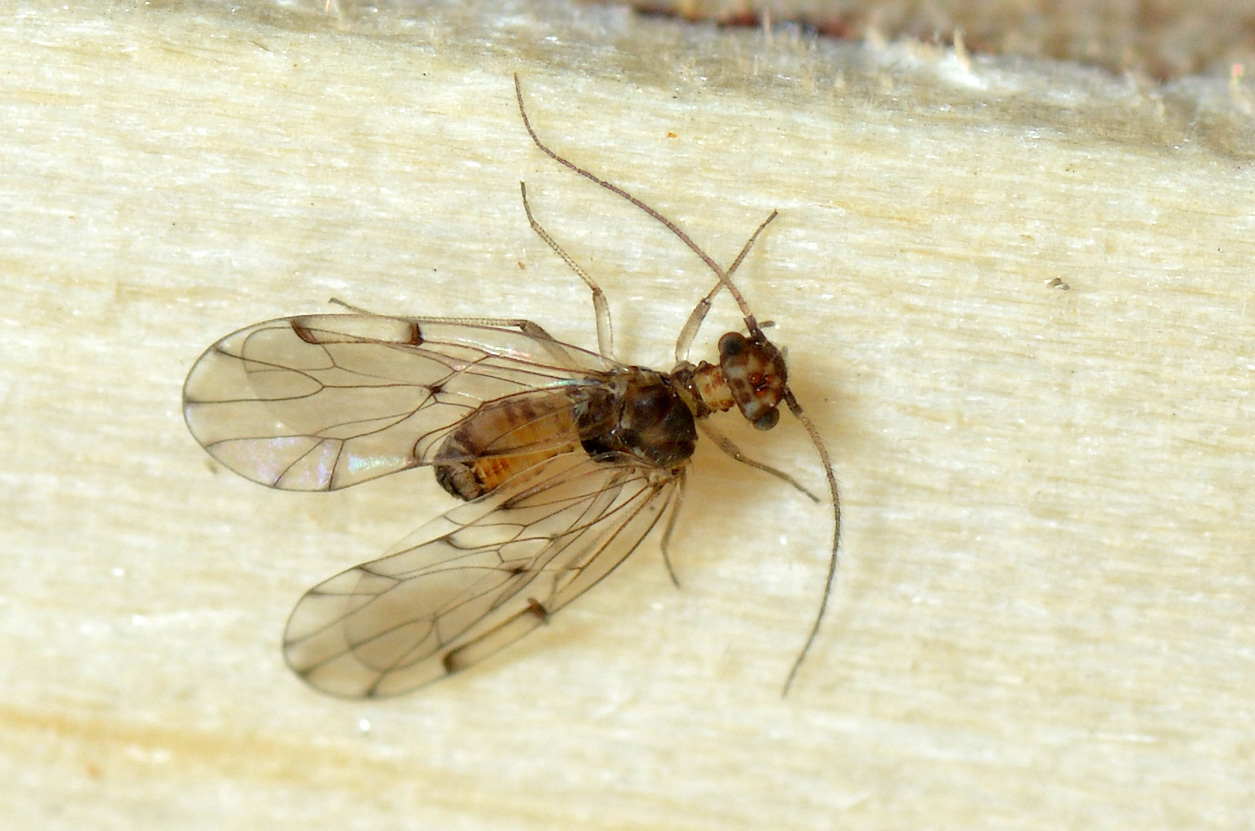

Scientific classification
- Kingdom: Animalia
- Phylum: Arthropoda
- Clade: Pancrustacea
- Class: Insecta
- Order: Psocodea
- Family: Ectopsocidae
- Genus: Ectopsocus
- Species: E. briggsi

Binomial name
- Ectopsocus briggsi (McLachlan, 1899)

Synonyms
- Ectopsocus meredionalis Ribaga, 1907

= Ectopsocus briggsi =

Species of booklouse

Ectopsocus briggsi is a species of Psocoptera from the family Ectopsocidae family that can be found in Great Britain and Ireland. It is brownish-orange in colour.

== Habitat ==
The species occurs on a range of trees and shrubs including:

- Alder
- Apple
- Ash
- Beech
- Birch
- Blackthorn
- Bramble
- Clematis
- Horse chestnut
- Lime
- Mistletoe
- Oak
- Plum
- Poplar
- Sycamore
- Sea-buckthorn
- Sweet chestnut
- Willow

They also occur in haystacks and leaf litter.
