= Ectopsocus strauchi =

Scientific classification
- Kingdom: Animalia
- Phylum: Arthropoda
- Clade: Pancrustacea
- Class: Insecta
- Order: Psocodea
- Family: Ectopsocidae
- Genus: Ectopsocus
- Species: E. strauchi

Binomial name
- Ectopsocus strauchi Enderlein, 1906

Species of booklouse

Ectopsocus strauchi is a species of outer barklouse in the family Ectopsocidae. It is found in Africa, the Caribbean, Europe and Northern Asia (excluding China), North America, and South America.
