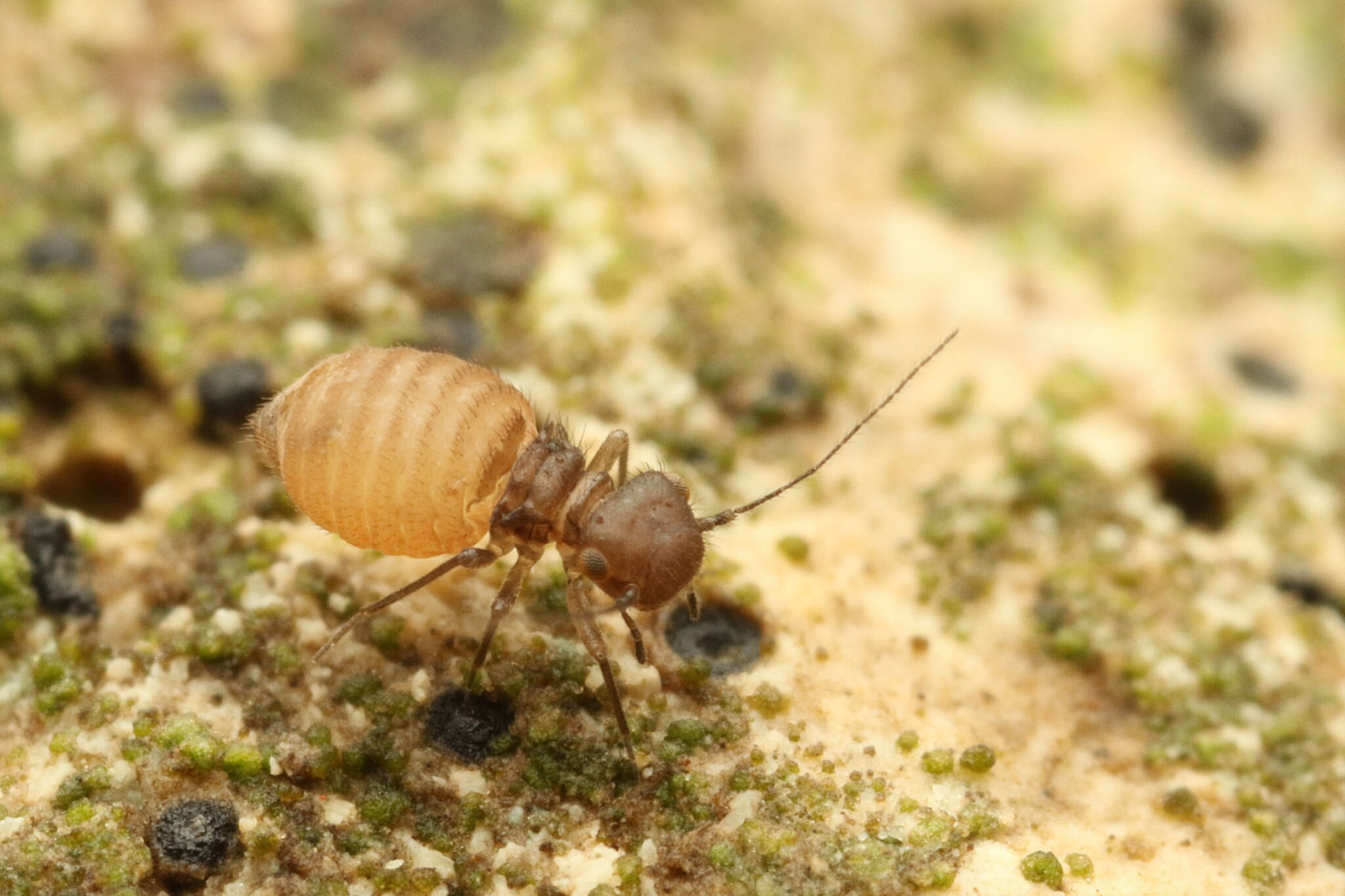
- Ectopsocus vachoni female in Israel

Scientific classification
- Kingdom: Animalia
- Phylum: Arthropoda
- Clade: Pancrustacea
- Class: Insecta
- Order: Psocodea
- Family: Ectopsocidae
- Genus: Ectopsocus
- Species: E. vachoni

Binomial name
- Ectopsocus vachoni Badonnel, 1945

= Ectopsocus vachoni =

Species of booklouse

Ectopsocus vachoni is a species of outer barklouse in the family Ectopsocidae. It is found in Africa, Australia, Europe and Northern Asia (excluding China), Central America, North America, and South America.
