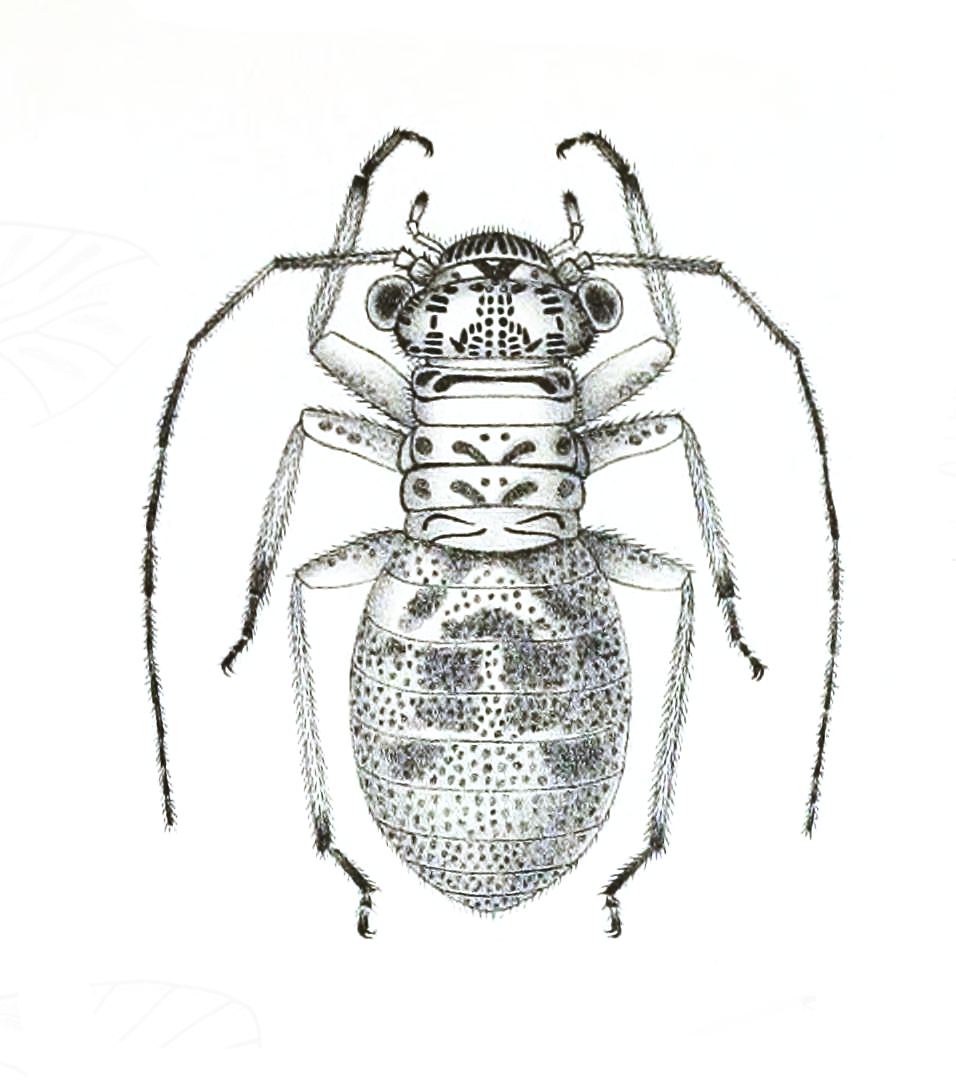
- M. montinus female

Scientific classification
- Domain: Eukaryota
- Kingdom: Animalia
- Phylum: Arthropoda
- Class: Insecta
- Order: Psocodea
- Family: Mesopsocidae
- Genus: Mesopsocus; Kolbe, 1880

= Mesopsocus =

Genus of booklice

Mesopsocus is a genus of middle barklice in the family Mesopsocidae. There are more than 60 described species in Mesopsocus.

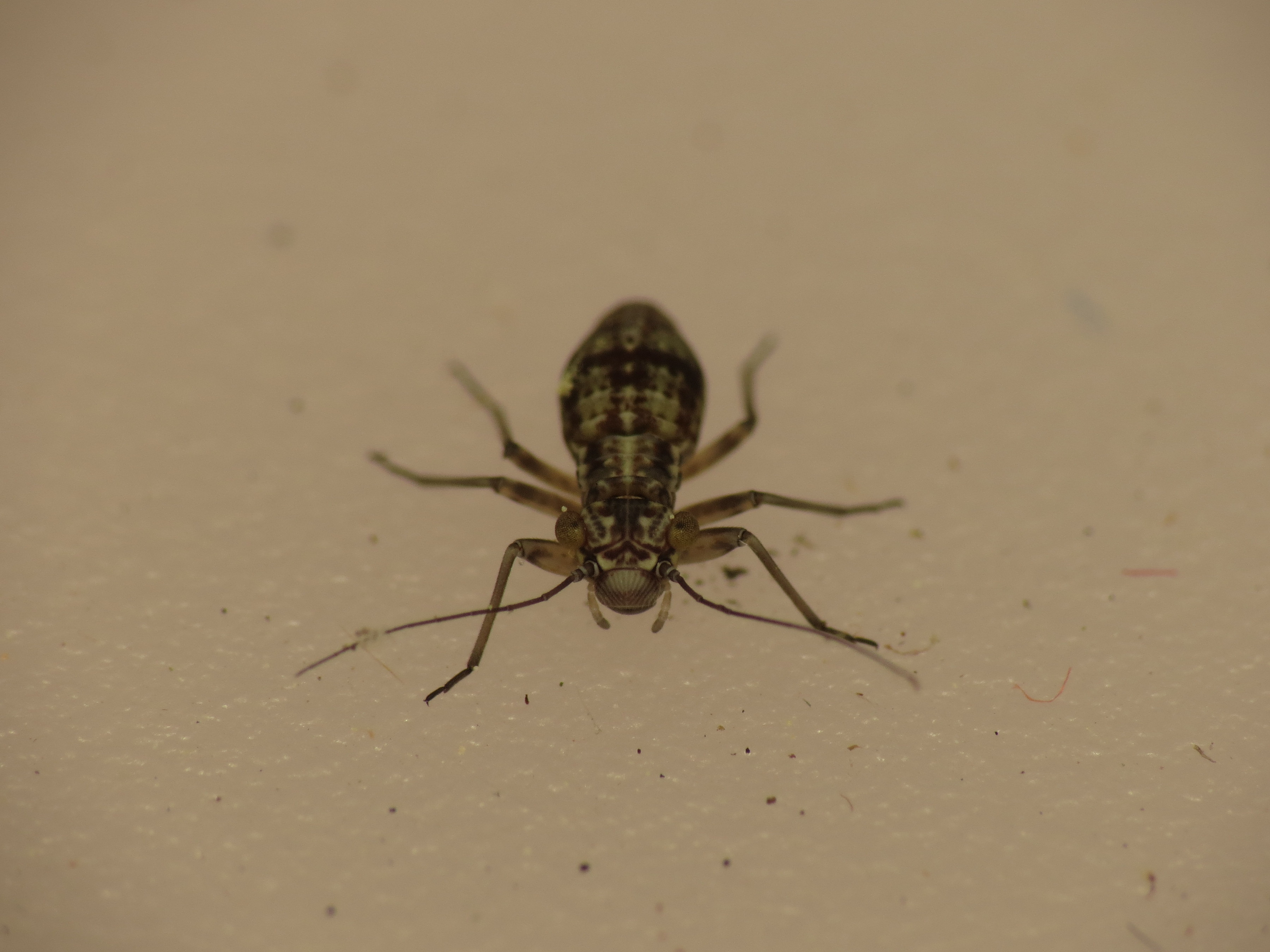

== Species ==
These 67 species belong to the genus Mesopsocus:

- Mesopsocus acutilobus Broadhead & Richards, 1982
- Mesopsocus alatus Broadhead & Richards, 1982
- Mesopsocus angolanus (Badonnel, 1977)
- Mesopsocus apterus Kaplin, 1990
- Mesopsocus atlasicus Badonnel, 1945
- Mesopsocus badhysi Kaplin, 1990
- Mesopsocus balachowskyi Badonnel, 1984
- Mesopsocus blancae Baz, 1988
- Mesopsocus boops (Hagen, 1859)
- Mesopsocus bousemani (Mockford, 2005)
- Mesopsocus brachyonematus (Li, 2002)
- Mesopsocus broadheadi Badonnel, 1982
- Mesopsocus carthaginensis Lienhard, 1988
- Mesopsocus clarki Badonnel, 1982
- Mesopsocus corniculatus (Li, 2002)
- Mesopsocus curvimarginatus (Li, 2002)
- Mesopsocus deserticus Garcia Aldrete, 1999
- Mesopsocus dichotomus (Li, 2002)
- Mesopsocus difficilis Broadhead & Richards, 1982
- Mesopsocus diopsis Enderlein, 1902
- Mesopsocus dislobus Yoshizawa, 1998
- Mesopsocus duboscqui Badonnel, 1938
- Mesopsocus enderleini Badonnel, 1982
- Mesopsocus fenestristigma (Badonnel, 1977)
- Mesopsocus fuscifrons Meinander, 1966
- Mesopsocus gabonensis Badonnel, 1977
- Mesopsocus giganteus Lienhard, 1995
- Mesopsocus graecus Lienhard, 1981
- Mesopsocus gynevolans Lienhard, 2009
- Mesopsocus helveticus Lienhard, 1977
- Mesopsocus hiemalis Marikowskii, 1957
- Mesopsocus hongkongensis Thornton, 1959
- Mesopsocus immunis (Stephens, 1836)
- Mesopsocus incomitatus Smithers, 1957
- Mesopsocus jiensis (Li, 2002)
- Mesopsocus jinicus (Li, 2002)
- Mesopsocus kopetdaghensis Kaplin, 1992
- Mesopsocus laricolus (Li, 2002)
- Mesopsocus laterimaculatus Ball, 1937
- Mesopsocus laticeps (Kolbe, 1880)
- Mesopsocus latreillei Badonnel, 1982
- Mesopsocus lienhardi Badonnel, 1982
- Mesopsocus marikovskyi Badonnel, 1982
- Mesopsocus meinanderi Badonnel, 1982
- Mesopsocus mockfordi Badonnel, 1982
- Mesopsocus montinus Enderlein, 1907
- Mesopsocus neimongolicus (Li, 2002)
- Mesopsocus nigrimaculatus (Li, 2002)
- Mesopsocus nigrostigma Badonnel, 1977
- Mesopsocus nitidifrons Broadhead & Richards, 1982
- Mesopsocus phaeodematus Li, 2002
- Mesopsocus propinquus Broadhead & Richards, 1982
- Mesopsocus salignus (Li, 2002)
- Mesopsocus similis Badonnel, 1977
- Mesopsocus smithersi Badonnel, 1982
- Mesopsocus stenopterus (Li, 2002)
- Mesopsocus strongylotus (Li, 2002)
- Mesopsocus tetensi Badonnel, 1982
- Mesopsocus thorntoni Badonnel, 1982
- Mesopsocus troodos Lienhard, 1995
- Mesopsocus tumorosus Smithers, 1957
- Mesopsocus unipunctatus (Müller, 1764)
- Mesopsocus vernus Lienhard, 1977
- Mesopsocus wardi Meinander, 1973
- Mesopsocus yemenitus Lienhard, 1988
- Mesopsocus yeni New, 1991
- Mesopsocus ypsilon Ball, 1937
