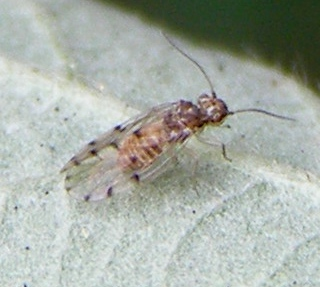
- Ectopsocus petersi

Scientific classification
- Kingdom: Animalia
- Phylum: Arthropoda
- Clade: Pancrustacea
- Class: Insecta
- Order: Psocodea
- Family: Ectopsocidae
- Genus: Ectopsocus (McLachlan, 1899)

= Ectopsocus =

Genus of booklice

Ectopsocus is a genus of psocoptera in the family Ectopsocidae.

== Species ==
This genus has more than 170 currently recognised species, including:

- Ectopsocus axillaris (Smithers, 1969)
- Ectopsocus briggsi McLachlan, 1899
- Ectopsocus californicus Banks, 1903
- Ectopsocus maindroni Badonnel, 1935
- Ectopsocus meridionalis Ribaga, 1904
- Ectopsocus petersi Smithers, 1978
- Ectopsocus pumilis Banks, 1920
- Ectopsocus richardsi Pearman, 1929
- Ectopsocus salpinx Thornton and Wong, 1968
- Ectopsocus strauchi Enderlein, 1906
- Ectopsocus thibaudi Badonnel, 1979
- Ectopsocus titschacki Jentsch, 1939
- Ectopsocus vachoni Badonnel, 1945

== See also ==
- List of Ectopsocus species
