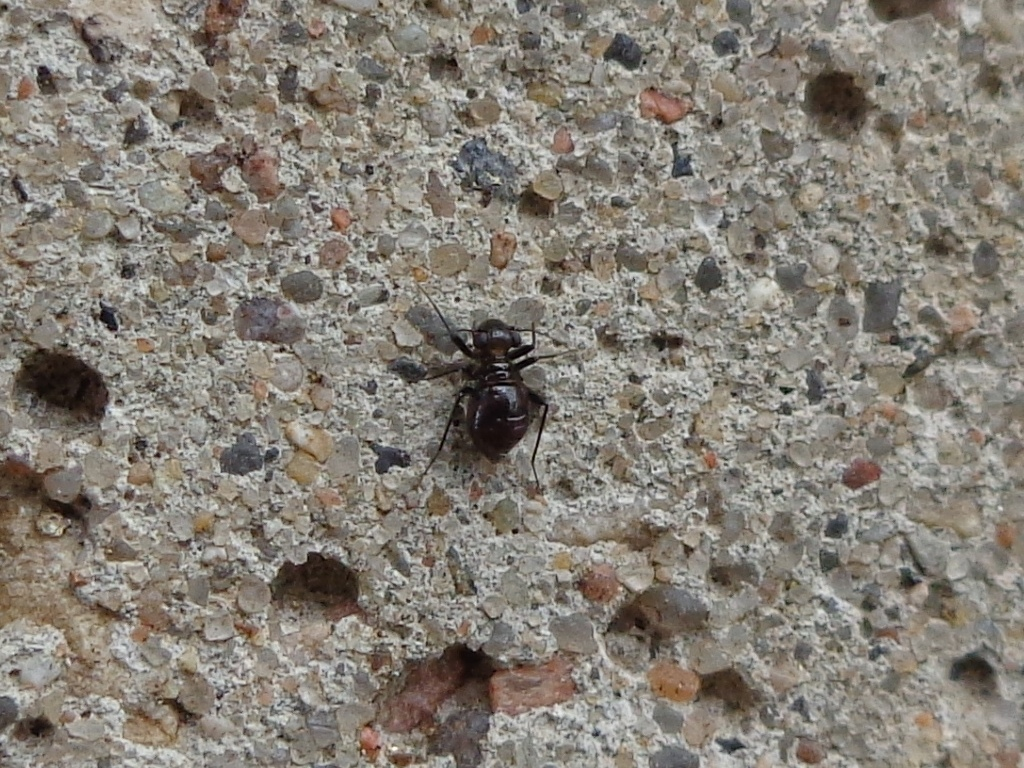

Scientific classification
- Domain: Eukaryota
- Kingdom: Animalia
- Phylum: Arthropoda
- Class: Insecta
- Order: Psocodea
- Family: Epipsocidae
- Genus: Bertkauia
- Species: B. lucifuga

Binomial name
- Bertkauia lucifuga (Rambur, 1842)

= Bertkauia lucifuga =

Species of booklouse

Bertkauia lucifuga is a species of Psocoptera from the Epipsocidae family that can be found in such European countries as Austria, Benelux, Bulgaria, Finland, Great Britain, Greece, Hungary, Italy, Ireland, Norway, Poland, Portugal, Romania, Spain, Sweden, and Switzerland. The species could also be found on islands like Madeira and Malta. Besides Europe, the species are common in North Africa and in Near East. The species are brownish-black coloured.

== Habitat ==
The species feed on apple trees, driftwood, ground litter and leaves.
