= Ectopsocus richardsi =

Scientific classification
- Domain: Eukaryota
- Kingdom: Animalia
- Phylum: Arthropoda
- Class: Insecta
- Order: Psocodea
- Family: Ectopsocidae
- Genus: Ectopsocus
- Species: E. richardsi

Binomial name
- Ectopsocus richardsi (Pearman, 1929)

Species of booklouse

Ectopsocus richardsi is a species of outer barklouse in the family Ectopsocidae. It is found in Africa, Australia, Europe and Northern Asia (excluding China), Central America, North America, Oceania, South America, and Southern Asia.
