= Ectopsocus thibaudi =

Scientific classification
- Domain: Eukaryota
- Kingdom: Animalia
- Phylum: Arthropoda
- Class: Insecta
- Order: Psocodea
- Family: Ectopsocidae
- Genus: Ectopsocus
- Species: E. thibaudi

Binomial name
- Ectopsocus thibaudi Badonnel, 1979

Species of booklouse

Ectopsocus thibaudi is a species of outer barklouse in the family Ectopsocidae. It is found in the Caribbean Sea, Central America, North America, and South America.
