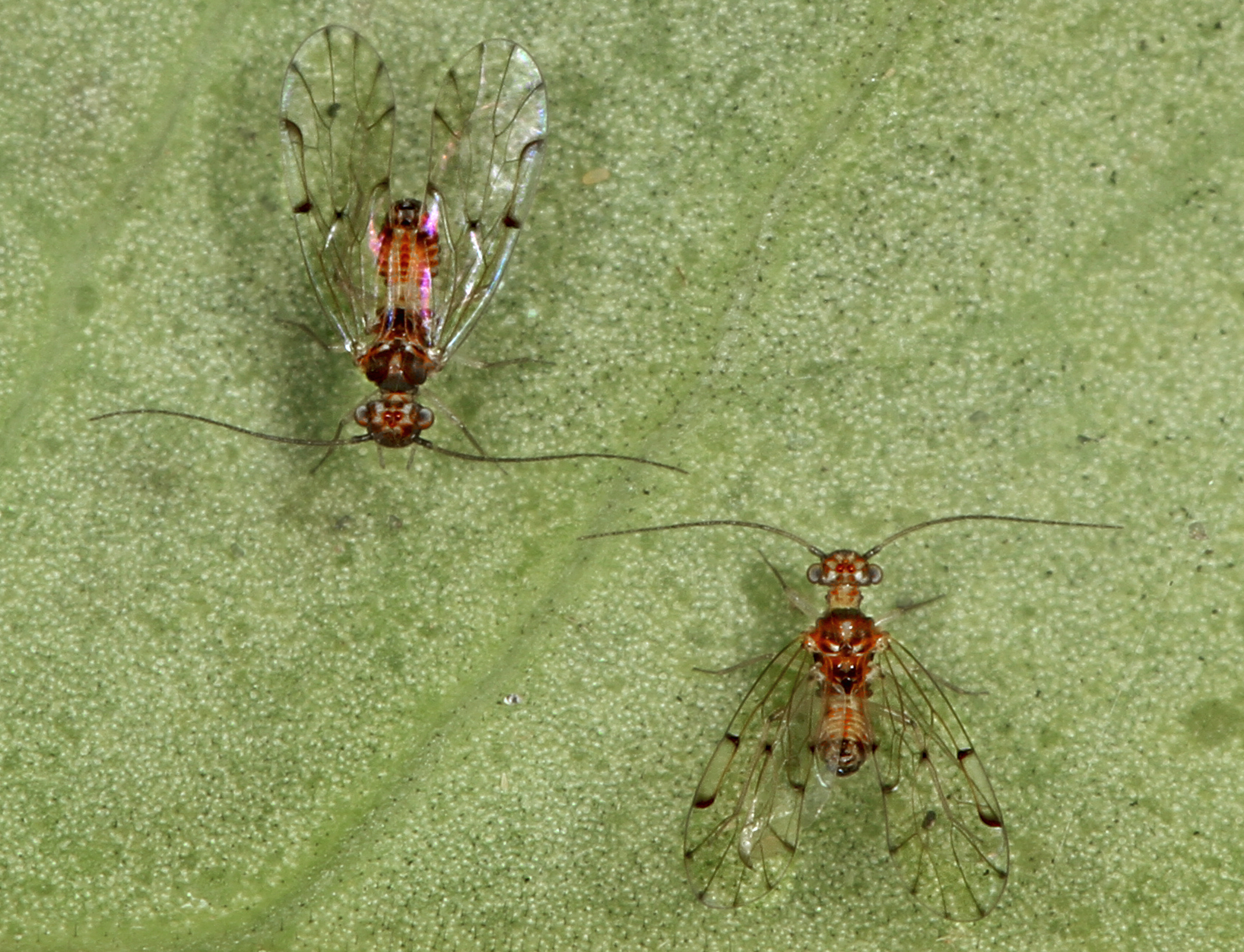

Scientific classification
- Domain: Eukaryota
- Kingdom: Animalia
- Phylum: Arthropoda
- Class: Insecta
- Order: Psocodea
- Family: Ectopsocidae
- Genus: Ectopsocus
- Species: E. californicus

Binomial name
- Ectopsocus californicus (Banks, 1903)

= Ectopsocus californicus =

Species of booklouse

Ectopsocus californicus is a species of outer barklouse in the family Ectopsocidae. It is found in Australia, Central America, and North America.
