= Costantino Ribaga =

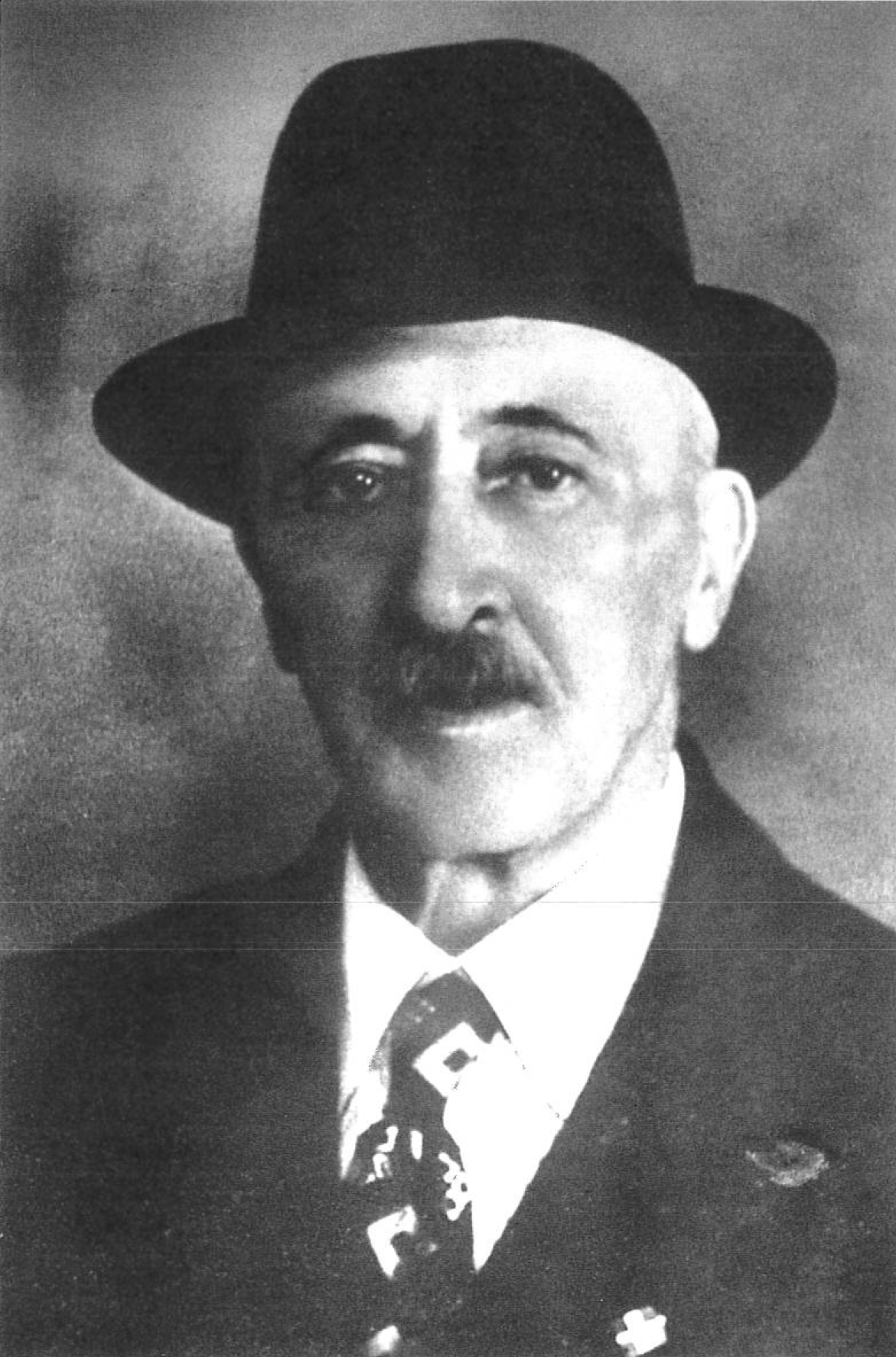

Costantino Ribaga (14 June 1870, Tiarno di Sopra – 20 February 1945) was an Italian acarologist and entomologist. He worked on the systematics of mites and psocoptera and contributed to biological control techniques. He described an organ in the female bed bug which is known as the organ of ribaga. Ribaga's organ also known as the paragenital sinus is located on the underside of the fourth abdominal segment into which the male bedbug traumatically inseminates the female.

== Life and work ==
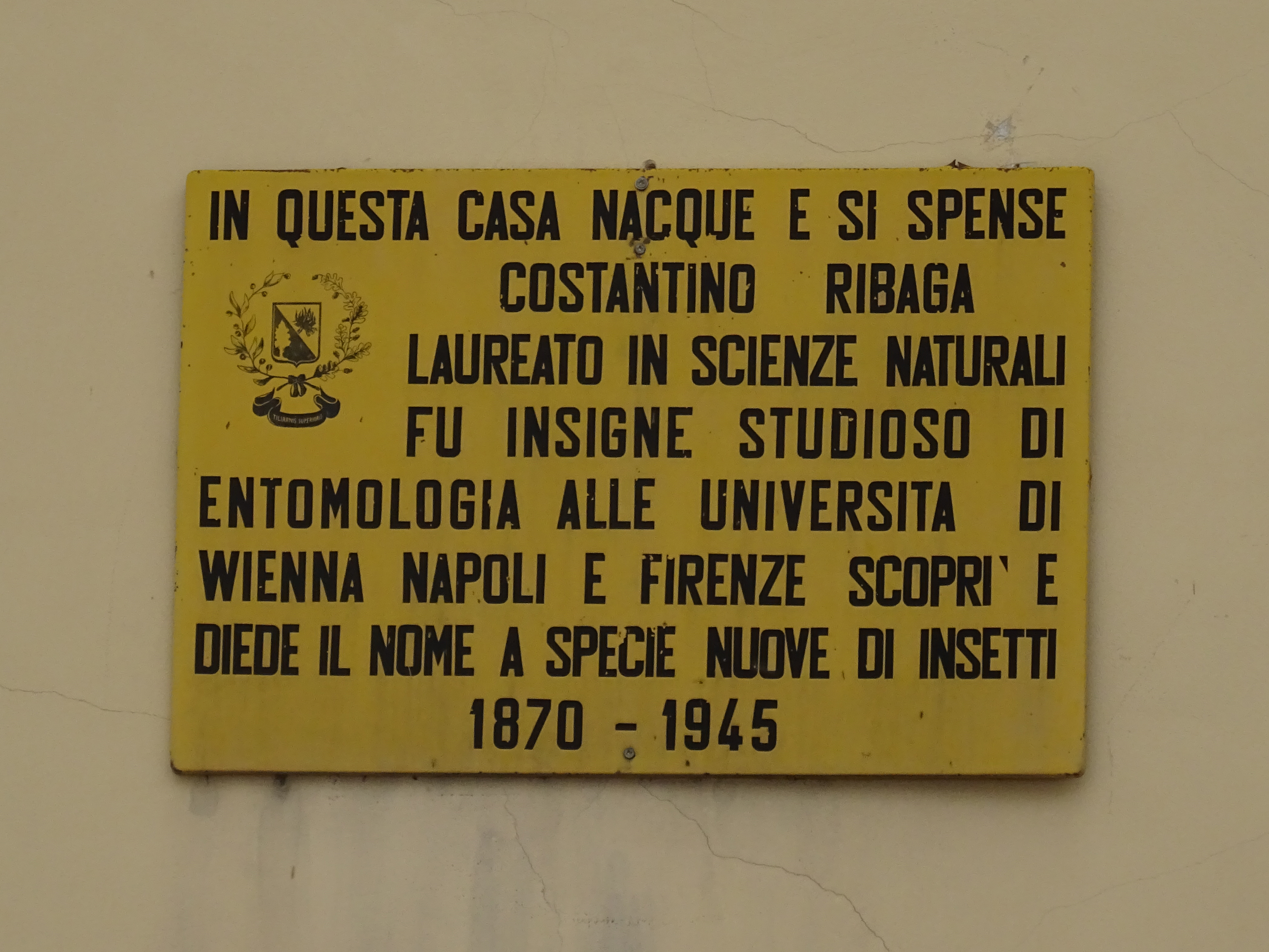
Commemorative plaque in Ribaga's birthplace

Ribaga was born in Tiarno di Sopra (Trento) and studied at the Ludwig-Maximilians-Universität München and graduated from the University of Padua in 1895. He worked at the University of Vienna before becoming an assistant to Antonio Berlese at the school of agriculture in Portici. In 1903, he succeeded Berlese and headed the Royal Agricultural Entomology Station in Florence and worked there until 1912. Ribaga established the genus Phytoseius in 1904 in his major work "Gamasidi planticoli" on the plant mites. Most of his specimens are lost, and his taxonomic work has been largely ignored. He described in 1896 what is now sometimes termed as the organ of Ribaga. This organ, found in the female bedbug, has a mesodermal portion which had been called as "Berlese's organ" and had been described in many bug groups including the Nabidae, Cimicidae, and Anthocoridae. The term ectospermalege is now used for the structure.
