= Epipsocidae =

- Neurostigma radiatum

Scientific classification
- Kingdom: Animalia
- Phylum: Arthropoda
- Clade: Pancrustacea
- Class: Insecta
- Order: Psocodea
- Suborder: Psocomorpha
- Infraorder: Epipsocetae
- Family: Epipsocidae

Synonyms
- Neurostigmatidae Eertmoed, 1973

Family of booklice

Epipsocidae is a family of bark lice in the insect order Psocodea (formerly Psocoptera) including over 260 species in 31 genera. The only European species in the family is the usually apterous Bertkauia lucifuga. In common with the other members of the infraorder Epipsocetae, they have a labrum with two sclerotized ridges. Epipsocids are found primarily in tropical regions, and one of their distinguishing characteristics is the hairy ventral surface of the forewing.

== Genera ==
The following genera are recognised in the family Epipsocidae:

- Anastomopsocus García-Aldrete, Mendivil & González-Obando, 2015
- Bertkauia Kolbe, 1882
- Cubitiglabra Li, 1995
- Cuscopsocus García-Aldrete, 2017
- Dichoepipsocus Li & Mockford, 1997
- Dicropsocus Smithers & Thornton, 1977
- Dimidistriata Li & Mockford, 1997
- Edmockfordia García-Aldrete, 2009
- Epipsocopsis Badonnel, 1955
- Epipsocus Hagen, 1866
- Goja Navas, 1927
- Gojaoides García-Aldrete, 2012
- Gonzobandia García-Aldrete, 2012
- Heteroepipsocus Li, 1995
- Hinduipsocus Badonnel, 1981
- Ianthorntonia García-Aldrete, 2004
- Incapsocus García-Aldrete, 2005
- Liratepipsocus Li, 2002
- Mesepipsocoides García-Aldrete & Casasola-Gonzalez, 2008
- Mesepipsocus Badonnel, 1969
- Metepipsocus Li, 2002
- Neurostigma Enderlein, 1900
- Odontopsocus Badonnel, 1987
- Papillopsocus García-Aldrete, 2005
- Parepipsocus Badonnel, 1986
- Periepipsocus García-Aldrete, Mendivil & González-Obando, 2015
- Phallofractus García-Aldrete, 2009
- Rogojiella García-Aldrete, 2004
- Spordoepipsocus Li, 2002
- Terryerwinia García-Aldrete, 2005
- Valvepipsocus Li, 2002

== Sources ==
- Lienhard, C. & Smithers, C. N. 2002. Psocoptera (Insecta): World Catalogue and Bibliography. Instrumenta Biodiversitatis, vol. 5. Muséum d'histoire naturelle, Genève.
