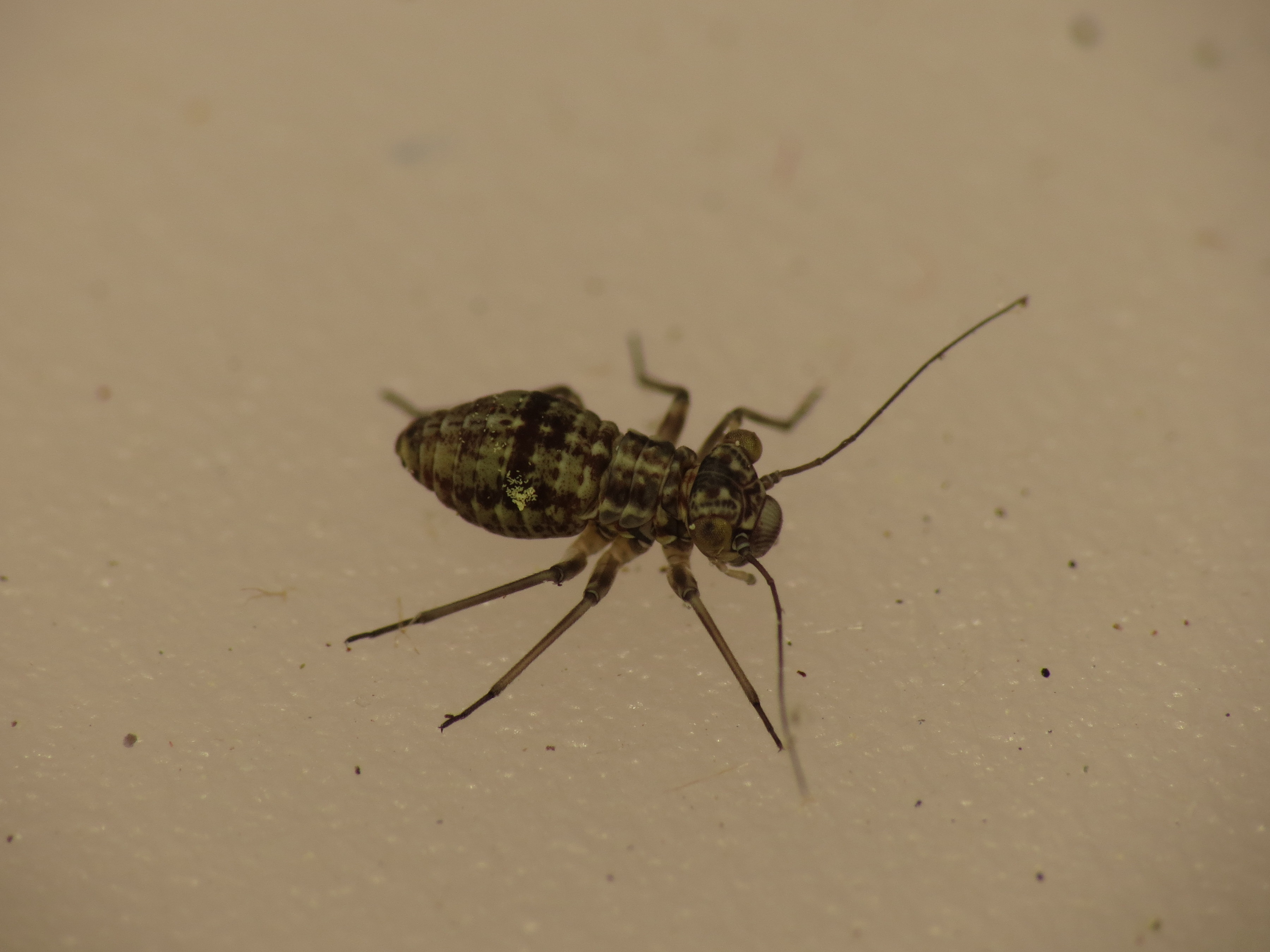

Scientific classification
- Kingdom: Animalia
- Phylum: Arthropoda
- Clade: Pancrustacea
- Class: Insecta
- Order: Psocodea
- Suborder: Psocomorpha
- Infraorder: Homilopsocidea
- Family: Mesopsocidae

Genera
- Cyrtopsochus; Hexacyrtoma; Idatenopsocus; Mesopsocidus; Mesopsocopsis; Mesopsocus; Metapsocus; Microtrichipsocus; Newipsocus; Psoculidus; Psoculus; Rhinopsocus

= Mesopsocidae =

Family of booklice

Mesopsocidae is a family of Psocodea (formerly Psocoptera) belonging to the suborder Psocomorpha. Members of the family are characterized by their free areola postica. The family includes more than 70 species.

== Sources ==
- Lienhard, C. & Smithers, C. N. 2002. Psocoptera (Insecta): World Catalogue and Bibliography. Instrumenta Biodiversitatis, vol. 5. Muséum d'histoire naturelle, Genève.
