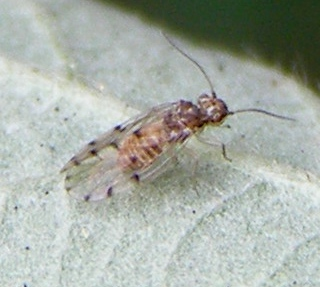
- Ectopsocus petersi

Scientific classification
- Kingdom: Animalia
- Phylum: Arthropoda
- Clade: Pancrustacea
- Class: Insecta
- Order: Psocodea
- Suborder: Psocomorpha
- Infraorder: Homilopsocidea
- Family: Ectopsocidae

Genera
- Belipsocus; Ectianoculus; Ectopsocopsis; Ectopsocus; Ectotrichus; Estipulaceus; Mascaropsocus

= Ectopsocidae =

Family of booklice

Ectopsocidae is a family of Psocodea (formerly Psocoptera) (book lice or bark lice) belonging to the suborder Psocomorpha. The family includes fewer than 200 species, most of them in the genus Ectopsocus.

== Distribution & Habitat ==
They are distributed worldwide, with the highest diversity in Asia. In the genera Ectopsocus and Ectopsocopsis, fourteen species are known from North America. Ectopsocids have been found to inhabit dead leaves on tree branches and leaf litter.

== Description ==
Members of the family are characterized by their absence of an areola postica in their wings, like in the family Peripsocidae. These are brown, small-sized bark lice (1.5-2.5 mm, both nymphs and adults) with or without markings on wings.

=== Distinctive features ===
The following are the distinctive features of these family members:

- Robust, small-bodied bark lice: 1.5-2.5 mm in length.
- Forewings are short, broad, and held in horizontal position (rather than tent-like as in other psocids).
- Forewing pterostigma is rectangular.
- Forewing areola postica is absent.
- Hindwing veins Rs and M are connected by crossvein.
