= Peripsocus =

- Peripsocus subfasciatus

Scientific classification
- Kingdom: Animalia
- Phylum: Arthropoda
- Clade: Pancrustacea
- Class: Insecta
- Order: Psocodea
- Family: Peripsocidae
- Genus: Peripsocus; Hagen, 1866

Diversity
- at least 250 species

Genus of booklice

Peripsocus is a genus of stout barklice in the family Peripsocidae. There are more than 250 species described in the genus Peripsocus.

== See also ==
- List of Peripsocus species
