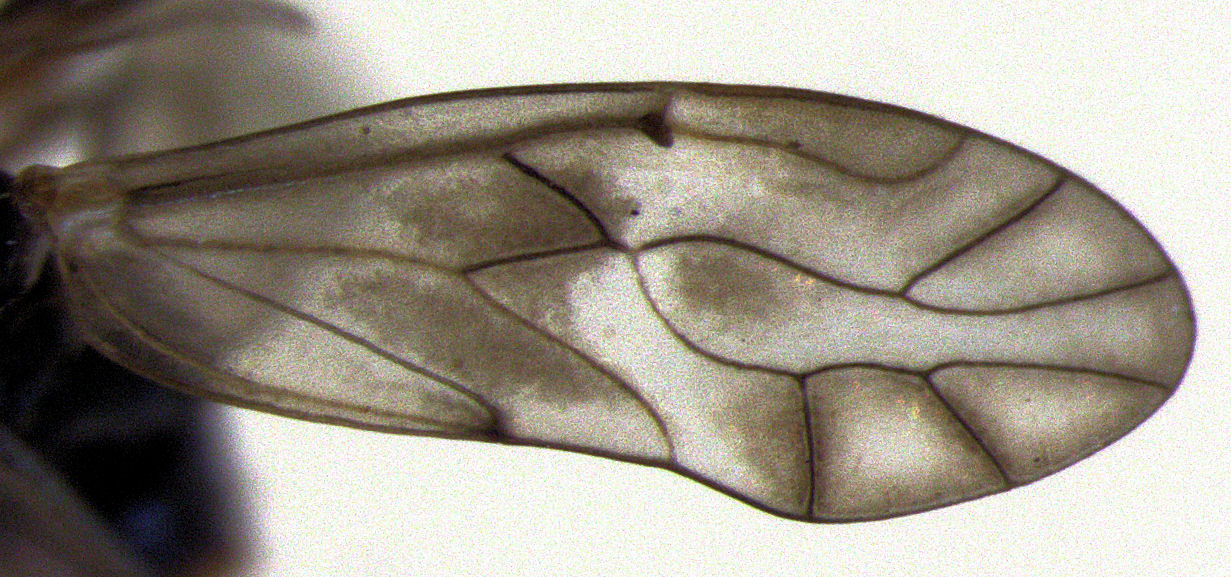
- Peripsocus milleri wing

Scientific classification
- Kingdom: Animalia
- Phylum: Arthropoda
- Clade: Pancrustacea
- Class: Insecta
- Order: Psocodea
- Suborder: Psocomorpha
- Infraorder: Homilopsocidea
- Family: Peripsocidae

= Peripsocidae =

Family of booklice

Peripsocidae is a family of Psocodea (formerly Psocoptera) belonging to the suborder Psocomorpha. Members of the family are characterised by their absence of an areola postica in their wings. Many of the recently described genera are closely allied to Peripsocus. The family includes more than 300 species.

== Genera ==
These 12 genera belong to the family Peripsocidae:

- Bicuspidatus^{c g}
- Campanulatus^{c g}
- Coniperipsocus^{c g}
- Cycloperipsocus^{c g}
- Diplopsocus^{c g}
- Kaestneriella Roesler, 1943^{i c g b}
- Orbiperipsocus^{c g}
- Pericupsocus^{c g}
- Peripsocus Hagen, 1866^{i c g b}
- Periterminalis^{c g}
- Properipsocus^{c g}
- Turriperipsocus^{c g}

Data sources: i = ITIS, c = Catalogue of Life, g = GBIF, b = Bugguide.net

== Sources ==
- Lienhard, C. & Smithers, C. N. 2002. Psocoptera (Insecta): World Catalogue and Bibliography. Instrumenta Biodiversitatis, vol. 5. Muséum d'histoire naturelle, Genève.
