= Jonas David (disambiguation) =

Jonas David may refer to:

- Jonas David, a German footballer.
- Jonas David Labram, a Swiss botanist, entomologist and illustrator.
- David Jonas, an American lawyer.

== See also ==
- Jonas Davidsson, a Swedish speedway rider.
- Jonas Davis, an Australian cricketer.
