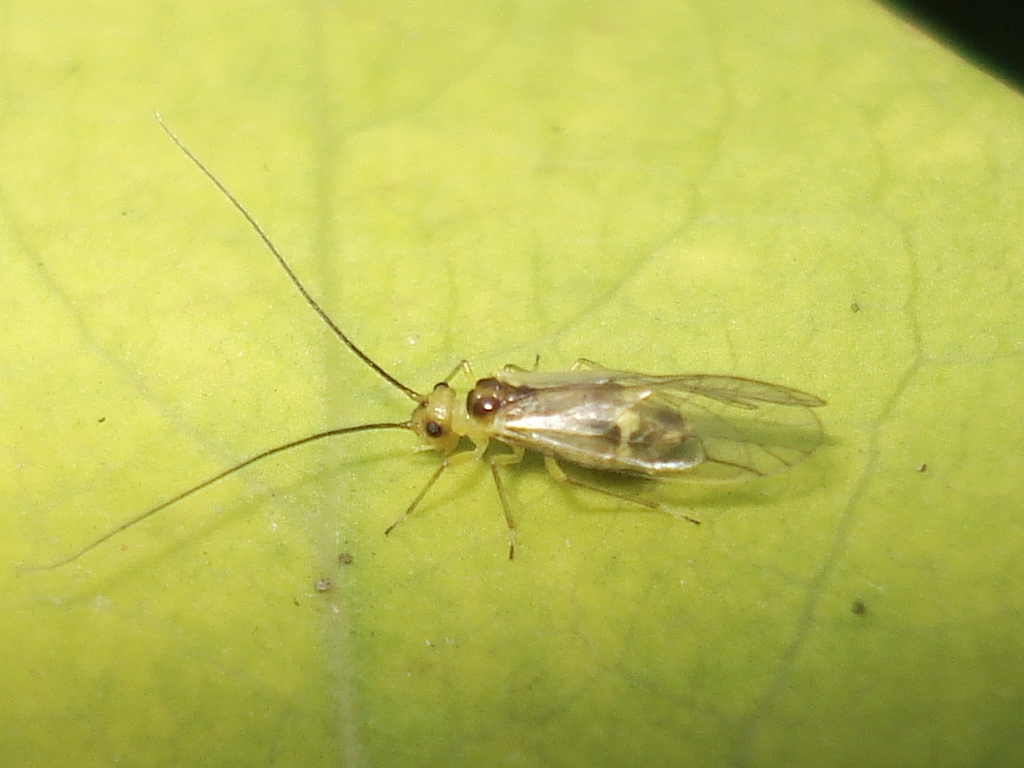

Scientific classification
- Domain: Eukaryota
- Kingdom: Animalia
- Phylum: Arthropoda
- Class: Insecta
- Order: Psocodea
- Family: Stenopsocidae
- Genus: Stenopsocus
- Species: S. stigmaticus

Binomial name
- Stenopsocus stigmaticus (Imhoff & Labram, 1842)

Synonyms
- Psocus stigmaticus Imhoff & Labram, 1842

= Stenopsocus stigmaticus =

Species of booklouse

Stenopsocus stigmaticus is a species of Psocoptera from the family Stenopsocidae that can be found in England, Ireland, and Wales. It can also be found in Austria, Belgium, Croatia, Finland, France, Germany, Hungary, Italy, Luxembourg, Poland, Romania, Spain, Switzerland, and the Netherlands. The species are yellowish-black coloured.

== Habitat ==
The species feed on alder, ash, blackthorn, elder, hawthorn, pine, sallow, and willow. They also feed on fruits such as apple, horse chestnut, and plum.
