= Enderleinella obsoleta =

- Enderleinella obsoleta in Germany

Scientific classification
- Kingdom: Animalia
- Phylum: Arthropoda
- Clade: Pancrustacea
- Class: Insecta
- Order: Psocodea
- Family: Stenopsocidae
- Genus: Enderleinella
- Species: E. obsoleta

Binomial name
- Enderleinella obsoleta (Stephens, 1836)

Species of booklouse

Enderleinella obsoleta is a species of Psocoptera from Stenopsocidae family that can be found in Great Britain and Ireland. The species are brown coloured.

== Habitat ==
The species feed on juniper, oak, pine, spruce, western gorse, and yew.
