= Stenopsocus immaculatus =

Scientific classification
- Domain: Eukaryota
- Kingdom: Animalia
- Phylum: Arthropoda
- Class: Insecta
- Order: Psocodea
- Family: Stenopsocidae
- Genus: Stenopsocus
- Species: S. immaculatus

Binomial name
- Stenopsocus immaculatus (Stephens, 1836)

Species of booklouse

Stenopsocus immaculatus is a species of Psocoptera from Stenopsocidae family that can be found in Great Britain and Ireland. The species are yellowish-black coloured.

== Habitat ==
The species feed on various trees including:

- Alder
- Ash
- Beech
- Birch
- Blackthorn
- Broom
- Elder
- Field maple
- Gorse
- Hawthorn
- Hazel
- Honeysuckle
- Hornbeam
- Larch
- Oak
- Pine
- Salix lapponum
- Sallow
- Spruce
- Sycamore
- Yew

They can also be found in leaf litter.
