= Enderleinella =

- Enderleinella obsoleta

Scientific classification
- Kingdom: Animalia
- Phylum: Arthropoda
- Clade: Pancrustacea
- Class: Insecta
- Order: Psocodea
- Family: Stenopsocidae
- Genus: Enderleinella; Badonnel, 1932

Genus of booklice

Enderleinella is a genus of insects belonging to the family Stenopsocidae.

The species of this genus are found in Europe and Australia.

== Species ==
- Enderleinella anocella Li & Fasheng, 1999
- Enderleinella aureola Li & Fasheng, 2002
- Enderleinella obsoleta (Stephens, 1836)
