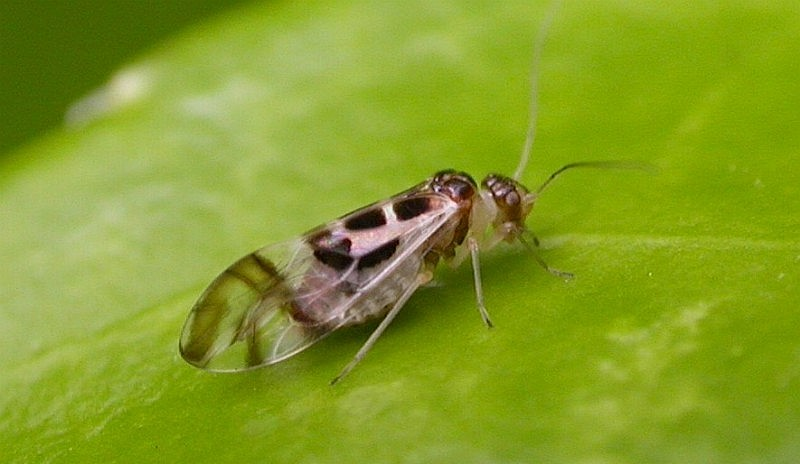

Scientific classification
- Kingdom: Animalia
- Phylum: Arthropoda
- Class: Insecta
- Order: Psocodea
- Family: Stenopsocidae
- Genus: Graphopsocus
- Species: G. cruciatus

Binomial name
- Graphopsocus cruciatus (Linnaeus, 1768)

= Graphopsocus cruciatus =

Species of booklouse

Graphopsocus cruciatus is a species of Psocoptera from Stenopsocidae family. The species was introduced to the North America from Asia or Europe in 1930.

== Description ==
The species have five dark marks on the first half of the wing and a light "F" like mark on the second half.
