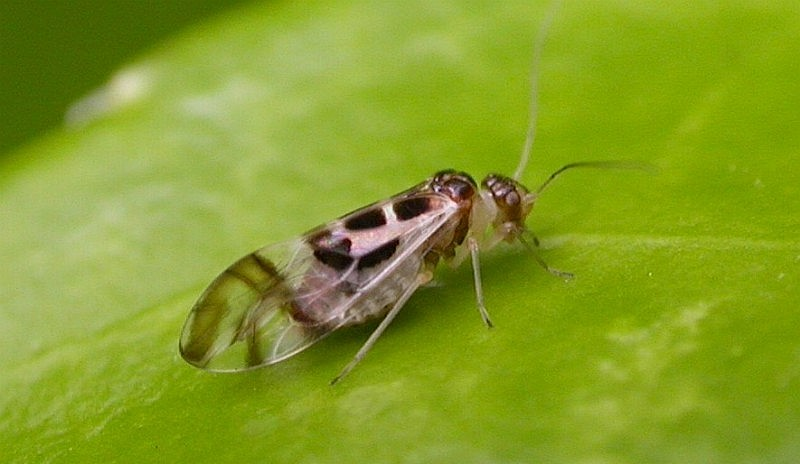
- Graphopsocus cruciatus

Scientific classification
- Kingdom: Animalia
- Phylum: Arthropoda
- Clade: Pancrustacea
- Class: Insecta
- Order: Psocodea
- Family: Stenopsocidae
- Genus: Graphopsocus; Kolbe, 1880

= Graphopsocus =

Genus of booklice

Graphopsocus is a genus of insects belonging to the family Stenopsocidae.

The species of this genus are found in Europe, Southeastern Asia and Northern America.

Species:

- Graphopsocus borealis Li, 2002
- Graphopsocus choui Li, 1992
- Graphopsocus cruciatus (Linnaeus, 1768)
- Graphopsocus epicharis Li, 2002
- Graphopsocus euneurus Li, 2002
- Graphopsocus evanidus Li, 2002
- Graphopsocus flavipunctatus Li, 2002
- Graphopsocus infirmus Banks, 1920
- Graphopsocus intrans Li, 2002
- Graphopsocus leptostigmus Li, 2002
- Graphopsocus liaoningensis Li, 2002
- Graphopsocus luojiashanensis Li, 2002
- Graphopsocus megistigmus Li, 2002
- Graphopsocus mexicanus Enderlein, 1909
- Graphopsocus obcuneatus Li, 2002
- Graphopsocus panduratus Li, 1989
- Graphopsocus platynotus Li, 2002
- Graphopsocus putuoshanensis Li, 2002
- Graphopsocus shaanxiensis Li, 1989
- Graphopsocus sinuolatus Li, 2002
- Graphopsocus subaequalis Banks, 1920
- Graphopsocus urceolatus Li, 1993
- Graphopsocus vietnamicus Liang, Li & Liu, 2013
