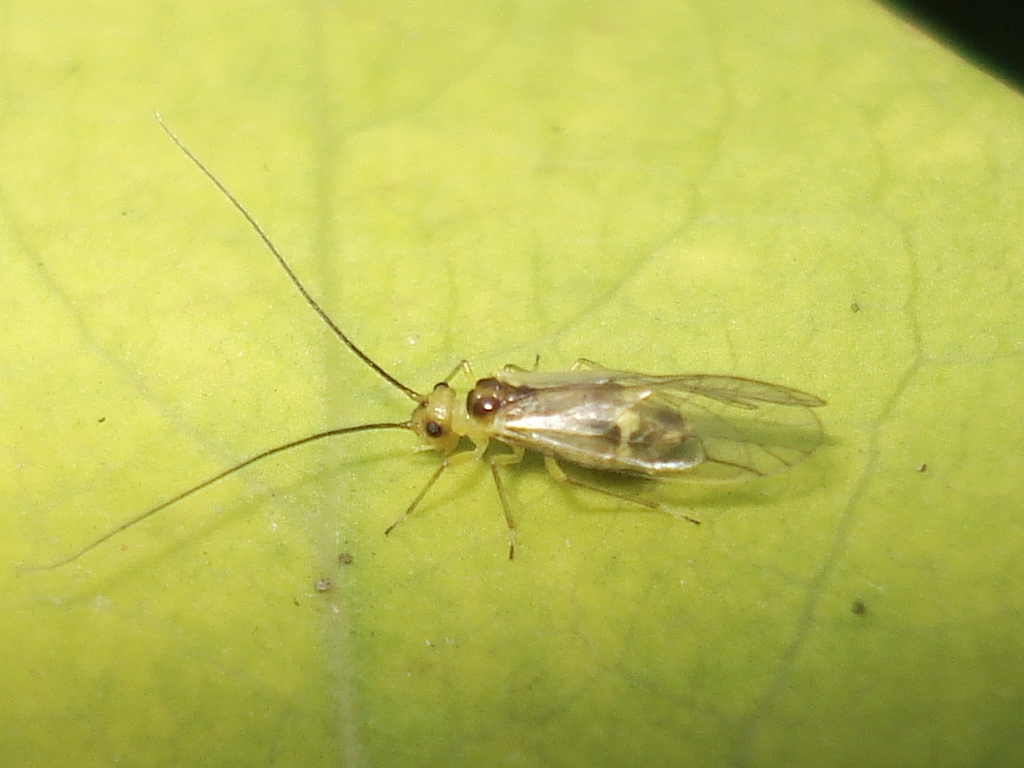
- Stenopsocus stigmaticus

Scientific classification
- Kingdom: Animalia
- Phylum: Arthropoda
- Clade: Pancrustacea
- Class: Insecta
- Order: Psocodea
- Family: Stenopsocidae
- Genus: Stenopsocus; Hagen, 1866

= Stenopsocus =

Genus of booklice

Stenopsocus is a genus of insects belonging to the family Stenopsocidae.

The species of this genus are found in Europe, Southeastern Asia and Australia.

Species:

- Stenopsocus abnormis Liang, Li & Liu, 2017
- Stenopsocus adisoemartoi Cole, New & Thornton, 1989
- Stenopsocus albipileus Smithers, 1974
- Stenopsocus albus Li, 1992
- Stenopsocus anchorocaulis (Li, 1993)
- Stenopsocus angustifurcus Li, 2002
- Stenopsocus angustistriatus Li, 2002
- Stenopsocus anthracinus Li, 1989
- Stenopsocus apertus (Hagen, 1859)
- Stenopsocus aphidiformis Enderlein, 1906
- Stenopsocus aphidiformis Hua, 2000
- Stenopsocus aureus Li, 2002
- Stenopsocus baishanzuensis (Li, 1995)
- Stenopsocus beijingensis (Li, 2002)
- Stenopsocus bellatulus Li, 1989
- Stenopsocus betulus Li, 2002
- Stenopsocus beunifascus (Li, 2005)
- Stenopsocus bicoloratus (Li, 2002)
- Stenopsocus bicoloratus Li, 2002
- Stenopsocus bicoloriceps Enderlein, 1934
- Stenopsocus biconicus Li, 2002
- Stenopsocus biconvexus Li, 1997
- Stenopsocus bimaculatus Li, 2002
- Stenopsocus bipunctatus Li, 2002
- Stenopsocus bombusus Li, 2002
- Stenopsocus brachychelus Li & Yang, 1988
- Stenopsocus brachycladus Li, 1989
- Stenopsocus brachyodicrus Li, 2002
- Stenopsocus brevicapitus Li, 1997
- Stenopsocus brevivalvaris Li, 2002
- Stenopsocus capacimacularus Li, 1993
- Stenopsocus cassideus Li, 1992
- Stenopsocus ceuthozibrinus Li, 2002
- Stenopsocus changbaishanicus Li, 2002
- Stenopsocus chebalingensis (Li, 1993)
- Stenopsocus chunfengae Li, 2005
- Stenopsocus chusanensis Navas, 1933
- Stenopsocus concisus Li, 2002
- Stenopsocus coronatus (Li, 2002)
- Stenopsocus coronatus Li, 2002
- Stenopsocus cunnatus (Li, 2002)
- Stenopsocus dactylinus Li, 1997
- Stenopsocus daozheniensis Li, 2005
- Stenopsocus denivalvis (Li, 1993)
- Stenopsocus dichospilus Li, 2002
- Stenopsocus dictyodromus Li, 1993
- Stenopsocus disphaeroides Li, 2002
- Stenopsocus dissimilis Banks, 1937
- Stenopsocus emeishanicus Li, 2002
- Stenopsocus eucallus Li & Yang, 1988
- Stenopsocus externus Banks, 1937
- Stenopsocus falcatus (Li, 2002)
- Stenopsocus fanjingshanicus Li & Yang, 1988
- Stenopsocus fastigiatus (Li, 2002)
- Stenopsocus faungi Li, 1999
- Stenopsocus flavicapitus (Li, 2002)
- Stenopsocus flavicaudatus Li, 2002
- Stenopsocus flavifrons Li, 1989
- Stenopsocus flavinigrus Li, 2002
- Stenopsocus floralis Li, 2002
- Stenopsocus foliaceus Li, 1997
- Stenopsocus formosanus Banks, 1937
- Stenopsocus frontalis Li, 1989
- Stenopsocus frontimaculatus Li, 1992
- Stenopsocus fulivertex Li, 2002
- Stenopsocus furcimaculatus (Li, 2002)
- Stenopsocus gannanensis (Li, 2002)
- Stenopsocus gannanensis Li, 2002
- Stenopsocus gansuensis Li, 2002
- Stenopsocus genostictus Li, 2002
- Stenopsocus gibbulosus Li, 1995
- Stenopsocus gracilimaculatus Li, 2002
- Stenopsocus gracillimus Li & Yang, 1988
- Stenopsocus guizhouiensis Li, 2002
- Stenopsocus hamaocaulis (Li, 1993)
- Stenopsocus hemiostictus Li, 2002
- Stenopsocus hexagonus Li, 2002
- Stenopsocus huangshanicus Li, 2002
- Stenopsocus hunanicus Li, 1992
- Stenopsocus immaculatus (Stephens, 1836)
- Stenopsocus isotomus Li, 2002
- Stenopsocus jocosus Banks, 1939
- Stenopsocus kunmingiensis Li, 2002
- Stenopsocus lachlani Kolbe, 1880
- Stenopsocus lacteus Li, 1997
- Stenopsocus laterimaculatus Li, 2002
- Stenopsocus lemniscsingulaeis Li, 2005
- Stenopsocus leucoresbius (Li, 2002)
- Stenopsocus lifashengi Mockford, 2003
- Stenopsocus liuae Li, 2002
- Stenopsocus liupanshanensis Li, 2002
- Stenopsocus locularis (Li, 2002)
- Stenopsocus longicuspis Li, 1997
- Stenopsocus longitudinalis Li, 2002
- Stenopsocus macrocheirus Li, 2002
- Stenopsocus macrostigmis (Li, 1995)
- Stenopsocus maculosus Li & Yang, 1988
- Stenopsocus majusculus (Li, 2002)
- Stenopsocus makii Takahashi, 1938
- Stenopsocus maximalis Li, 1997
- Stenopsocus melanocephalus Li, 1997
- Stenopsocus mesozonalis (Li, 2002)
- Stenopsocus metastictus Li, 2002
- Stenopsocus naevicapitatus Li, 2002
- Stenopsocus nepalensis New, 1971
- Stenopsocus niger Enderlein, 1906
- Stenopsocus nigricellus Okamoto, 1907
- Stenopsocus obscurus Li, 1997
- Stenopsocus oculimaculatus Li, 1992
- Stenopsocus orbiculatus (Li, 1995)
- Stenopsocus ovalimacularis (Li, 2002)
- Stenopsocus pallidus Thornton & Wong, 1966
- Stenopsocus palmatus (Li, 2002)
- Stenopsocus parviforficatus Li, 2002
- Stenopsocus pavonicus Li, 2002
- Stenopsocus paxillivalvaris Li, 2002
- Stenopsocus pellucidus (Li, 2002)
- Stenopsocus percussus Li, 1995
- Stenopsocus periostictus Li, 2002
- Stenopsocus perspicuus Li, 1997
- Stenopsocus phaeostigmis (Li, 1995)
- Stenopsocus phaeostigmus Li, 1992
- Stenopsocus phaneostriatus Li, 2002
- Stenopsocus pilosus Enderlein, 1926
- Stenopsocus platynotus Li, 1995
- Stenopsocus platyocephalus Li, 2002
- Stenopsocus platytaenius (Li, 2002)
- Stenopsocus podorphus Li, 1997
- Stenopsocus polyceratus Li, 2002
- Stenopsocus pygmaeus Enderlein, 1906
- Stenopsocus pyriformis (Li, 2002)
- Stenopsocus qianipullus Li, 2005
- Stenopsocus quaternatus (Li, 2002)
- Stenopsocus radimaculatus Li, 1989
- Stenopsocus revolutus Li, 1993
- Stenopsocus rubellus Thornton, 1984
- Stenopsocus shennongjiaensis Li, 2002
- Stenopsocus sichuanicus Li, 2002
- Stenopsocus signatipennis New, 1978
- Stenopsocus silvaticus Li, 2002
- Stenopsocus spilipsocius (Li, 1997)
- Stenopsocus spongiosus Li, 2002
- Stenopsocus stigmaticus (Imhoff & Labram, 1842)
- Stenopsocus striolatus Li, 1992
- Stenopsocus symipsarous Li, 2002
- Stenopsocus thermophilus Li, 2002
- Stenopsocus tianmushanensis (Li, 2002)
- Stenopsocus tibialis Banks, 1937
- Stenopsocus tonkinensis Enderlein, 1903
- Stenopsocus tribulbus Li, 1993
- Stenopsocus trinotatus (Li, 1993)
- Stenopsocus tripartibilis Li, 2002
- Stenopsocus trisetus Li, 2002
- Stenopsocus turgidus Li, 1997
- Stenopsocus uniformis (Hagen, 1859)
- Stenopsocus valvilacteus Li, 2005
- Stenopsocus wangi Liang, Li & Liu, 2017
- Stenopsocus wuxiaensis Li, 1997
- Stenopsocus xanthophaeus Li, 2002
- Stenopsocus xanthostigmus Li, 2002
- Stenopsocus xiangxiensis Li, 1992
- Stenopsocus xilingxianicus Li, 1997
- Stenopsocus yuensis (Li, 1993)
- Stenopsocus zonatus Li, 1989
