= Marine Corps League =

US Marine Corps Veterans Service Organization

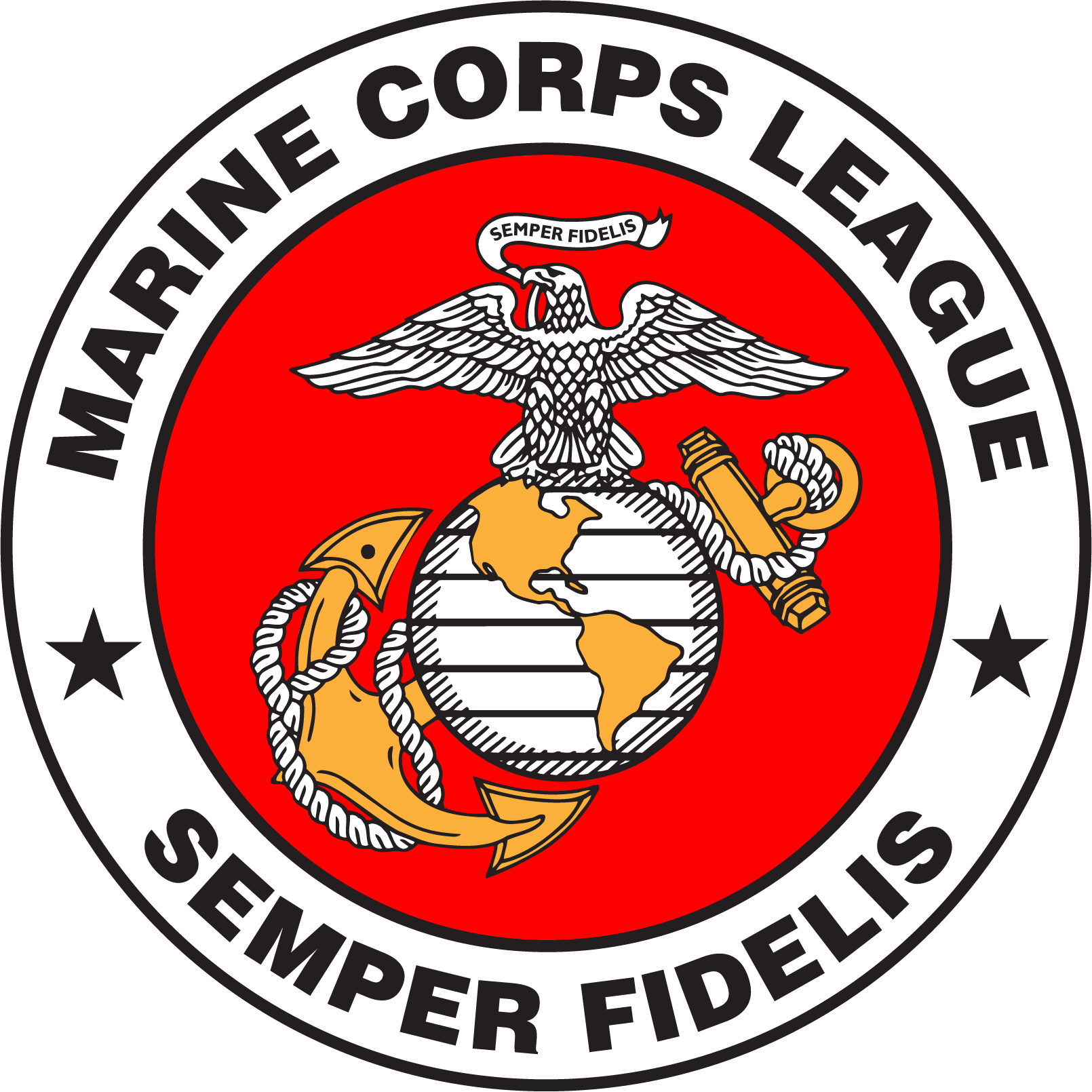
- Official Emblem
- Established: November 10, 1922; 104 years ago
- Founders: Major Sidney W. Brewster, ret.; First Lt. Paul Howard, ret.; First Lt. James Duffy, ret.; Second Lt. Frank D'Ipoli; Albert Lages; Milton Solomon; Roy Hagan; Frank X. Lambert; Miss Ray C. Sawyer; Mrs. Mae Garner; Webster de S. Smith; Merle McAlister; Rev. John H. Clifford; Raymond L. Will; and others were present.; MajGen John A. Lejeune
- Founded at: New York City
- Type: 501(c)(4) – U.S. Marines Corps veterans organization
- Tax ID no.: 23-1598250
- Legal status: 36 U.S.C. 140101 – U.S. chartered corporation
- Headquarters: Stafford, Virginia
- Coordinates: 39.776996°N 86.156201°W
- Region served: Worldwide
- Members: c. 63,250 (2019)
- National Commandant: TJ Morgan
- National Senior Vice Commandant: Russ Miller
- National Junior Vice Commandant: David Porter
- National Judge Advocate: Bruce Rakfeldt
- Board of directors: National Division Vice Commandants
- Key people: Chief Operating Officer: Robert J. Borka
- Main organ: National Convention
- Publication: Semper Fi Magazine
- Subsidiaries: Marine Corps League Auxiliary; Military Order of Devil Dogs; MCL Foundation; Marine of the Year Society; U.S. Marines Youth Foundation; Young Marines
- Website: mclnational.org
- Formerly called: Marine Corps Veterans Association (MCVA)

The Marine Corps League is the only congressionally chartered United States Marine Corps-related Veterans Service Organization in the United States. Its congressional charter was approved by the 75th U.S. Congress and signed by President Franklin D. Roosevelt on August 4, 1937. The organization credits Major General John A. Lejeune, the 13th Marine Corps commandant, as one of its founding members.

The League holds a congressional charter under Title 36 of the United States Code.

== Mission statement ==
The mission of the Marine Corps League is to promote the interest and to preserve traditions of the United States Marine Corps; strengthen the fraternity of Marines and their families; serve Marines and Fleet Marine Force (FMF) Servicemembers who wear or who have worn the Eagle, Globe and Anchor; and foster the ideals of Americanism and patriotic volunteerism.

== History ==
The Marine Corps League perpetuates the traditions and spirit of all Marines and FMF Servicemembers who wear or have worn the Eagle, Globe and Anchor of the Marine Corps. The League is the only federally chartered Marine Corps-related Veterans Service Organization in the country. Since its earliest days, the League has enjoyed the support and encouragement of the active duty and reserve establishments of the Marine Corps. The League boasts a membership of more than 50,000 men and women, officer and enlisted, active duty, reserve Marines, honorably discharged Marine veterans, and qualified Navy FMF servicemembers.

=== Marine Corps Veterans Conference of 1922 (November 10, 1922) ===
In 1922, retired Major Sidney W. Brewster had a vision in which appeared thousands of Marines marching in a parade. Until February 1923, his vision was an obsession until others with whom Brewster talked became impressed. From 1919-23, veteran organizations sprang up in all parts of the country. Clubs, associations and groups for Marine veterans were formed in keeping with the prevalent feeling of esprit de corps and good fellowship. They had served and fought together and now they met to recount the days of 1917-19 spent in Parris Island, Quantico, France and Germany.

A gathering convened on November 10, 1922 at the Hotel McAlpin in New York City to discuss establishing relationships with other Marine Corps veteran organizations. Among attendees were retired First Lt. Paul Howard, retired First Lt. James Duffy, Second Lt. Frank D'Ipoli, Albert Lages, Milton Solomon, Roy Hagan, Frank Lambert, Miss Ray Sawyer, Mrs. Mae Garner, Webster de S. Smith, Merle McAlister and Rev. J. H. Clifford. After lengthy discussion, Brewster's vision materialized and he was elected temporary chairman. Sawyer was elected temporary secretary and Raymond Wills was elected temporary treasurer.

A committee was appointed to plan a national organization and the name "Marine Corps Veterans Association" was adopted. The titles of officers were then changed to Commandant, Adjutant, Paymaster, etc.

Brewster was elected as commandant by acclamation, holding that position until the election of Major General John A. Lejeune at the second annual convention. Sawyer worked almost day and night during those early days to obtain a place for the new organization.

The Marine Corps Veterans Association began to organize posts across the country. The first New York post unanimously elected Colonel George C. Reid as post commandant on December 11, 1922. Detachments began to organize in Philadelphia, Baltimore, Buffalo, Niagara Falls, Cleveland, Chicago, Indianapolis, Houston and Pittsburgh.

The New York Post and the McLemore Detachment are the only remaining units of the Marine Corps Veterans Association that predate the Marine Corps League.

The following list of units is arranged in order of first publication appearance in the Leatherneck Magazine (no organization or charter dates mentioned):

MARINE CORPS VETERANS ASSOCIATION DETACHMENTS
No.	Post/Detachment name	City	State	Organization date	Charter date	Status	Leatherneck Magazine issue
1	New York (Post) Detachment	New York City	New York	December 11, 1922	Unknown	Active	December 1922
2	Anthony-Fagan Detachment	Albany	New York	Unknown	Unknown	Deactivated	February 1923
3	Elias Jay Messinger Detachment	Tacoma	Washington	Unknown	Unknown	Deactivated	April 1923
4	McLemore Detachment	Houston	Texas	Unknown	Unknown	Active	May 1923

=== All-Marine Caucus of 1923 (June 3–6, 1923) ===
The Marine Corps League was organized at the All-Marine caucus held at the Hotel Pennsylvania in New York City from June 3–6, 1923. It was the offspring of the Marine Corps Veterans Association headed by Brewster, who presided at the caucus.

Marine Corps veterans from many states attended. LeJeune, Commandant of the Marine Corps at the time, was unable to be present, but was kept informed of the proceedings by telephone. Brigadier General James G. Harbord, U.S. Army, who commanded the Second Division, American Expeditionary Force (A.E.F.), which included the Fifth Marine Regiment and Sixth Marine Regiment, addressed the closing session and was made an honorary member. At the end of the caucus, the Marine Corps Veterans Association would change its name after a bitter battle on the floor to the "Marine Corps League."

Lejeune was unanimously elected to the position of national commandant and Brewster became the first past national commandant. An amendment to the constitution was also passed at this convention: "All Past National Commandants shall be members of the Staff for life, with vote, and shall also be life delegates to the National Assembly with vote."

=== Progression of the Marine Corps League ===
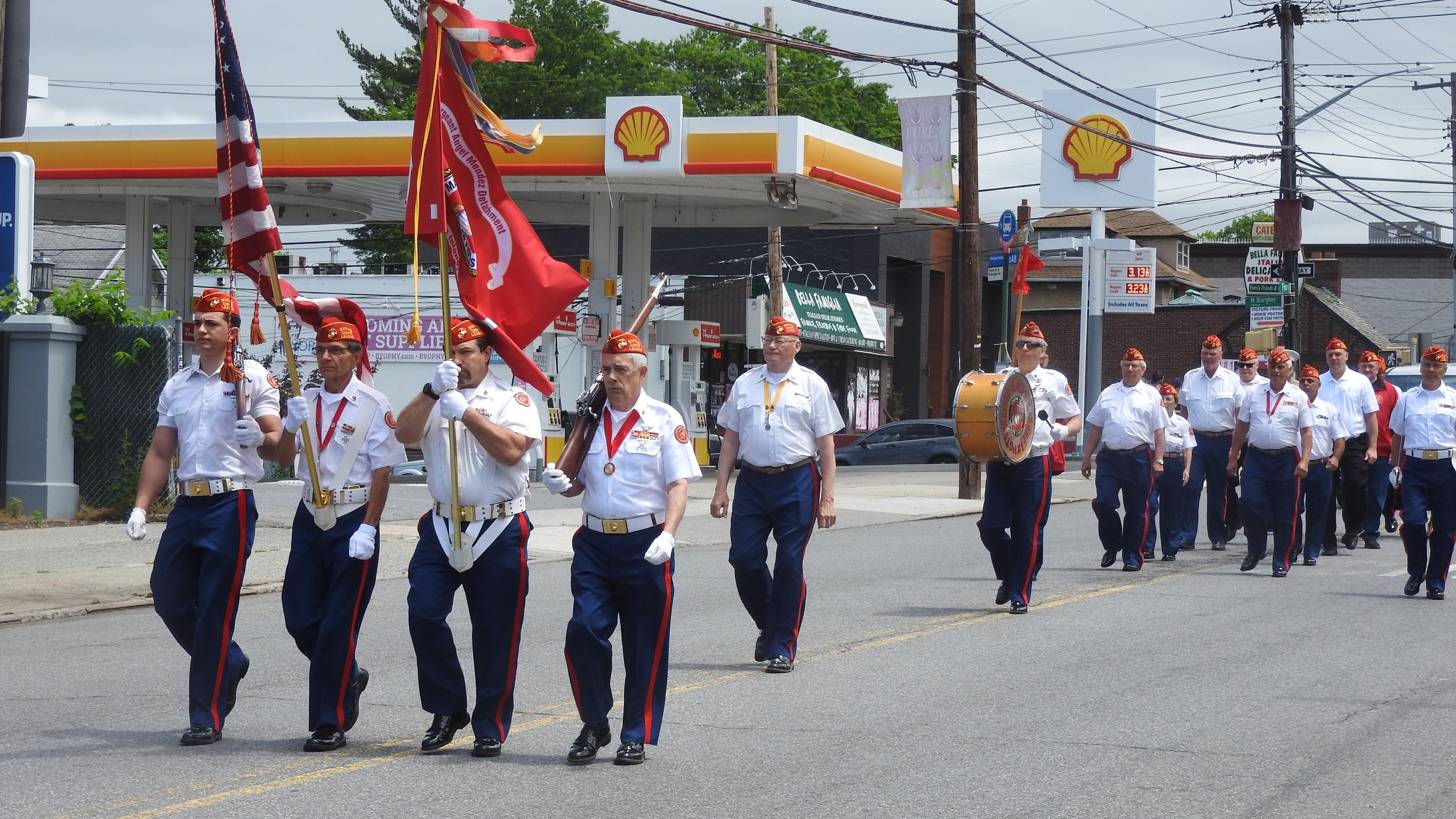
Marine Corps League in Staten Island Memorial Day Parade, 2021

The New York detachment would be the first chartered at the "All Marine Caucus" under the national organization's new name as New York Detachment No. 1, thus making it the League's oldest continuous detachment. Colonel George C. Reid continued as the detachment commandant. After the conclusion of the caucus, other detachments began to organize. Buffalo, New York was the second and Newark, New Jersey the third. Other detachments quickly followed in the east and midwest. By 1928, detachments reached to the west coast. The second national convention was held in Washington, DC, the third in Philadelphia, the fourth in Cleveland and the fifth in Erie, Pennsylvania. LeJeune remained as national commandant until 1929, when Maj. Gen. Wendell C. Neville succeeded him as Marine Corps Commandant. LeJeune then appointed Neville as the National Commandant of the Marine Corps League for the duration of his term until the next national convention in St. Louis, MO in 1930. At the St. Louis convention, W. Karl Lations of Worcester, Massachusetts was elected the first civilian commandant of the League.

The League prospered and expanded under the leadership of Lations, who was national commandant until 1931, when the ninth national convention in Buffalo, New York elected Carlton A. Fisher of the Niagara-Frontier detachment to succeed Lations.

The Great Depression handicapped the League and other veteran and fraternal groups. In 1932, a movement was started in Washington under the guise of economy to abolish the Marine Corps. This was frustrated when New York Detachment No. 1 began a newspaper campaign of protest, followed by contact with every senator and congressman in the United States Congress by letter and personal visits, which ended the movement.

John F. Manning of Methuen, Massachusetts succeeded Fisher as national commandant at the convention in Denver, Colorado in 1934. Manning was succeeded by Maurice A. Illch of Albany, New York at the national convention in Boston, Massachusetts in 1936. During his administration, the "Corrigan Will" contest was settled, which enriched the national treasury by $10,000. On August 4, 1937, the League was chartered by Congress.

Florence E. O'Leary of Cincinnati, Ohio succeeded Illch as national commandant at the national convention in Washington, DC in 1938. He was succeeded by Chris J. Cunningham of Albany, New York at the national convention in Detroit in 1940. During Cunningham's tenure, League membership more than doubled, the number of detachments increased to more than 160 and the first monthly national bulletin was launched. Cunningham was succeeded by Judge Alexander F. Ormsby of Jersey City, New Jersey at the national convention in Chicago. Cunningham was succeeded by Thomas E. Wood at the national convention held in the New Yorker Hotel in September 1943.

MARINE CORPS LEAGUE DETACHMENTS
No.	Detachment Name	City	State	Organization Date	Charter Date	Status
1	New York Detachment No. 1	New York City	New York	June 3, 1923	June 6, 1923	Active
2	Buffalo Detachment No. 2	Buffalo	New York	Unknown	Unknown	Deactivated
3	Newark Detachment No. 3	Newark	New Jersey	Unknown	Unknown	Deactivated

== Programs ==
The Marine Corps League supports various programs to promote and honor the spirit and traditions of the Marines:

=== Injured Marines ===
- Marines Helping Marines—Wounded Marines Program: Supports injured Marines in the following
  - Brooke Army Medical Center (San Antonio, Texas)
  - Walter Reed Army Medical Center (Washington, D.C.)
  - Naval Hospitals
    - National Naval Medical Center, Bethesda, Maryland
    - Naval Medical Center Portsmouth, Portsmouth, Virginia
    - Naval Medical Center San Diego (Balboa Naval Hospital)
    - Naval Hospital Camp Pendleton
- Marine-4-Life/Injured Marine Support Program: Mentors and provides support for transitioning Marines.
- National Marksmanship Program: keeping the heritage and tradition of elite marksmanship. This program promotes safe and responsible marksmanship across the nation. The Marine Corps League Shooting Team is a program within the MCLMP

=== Youth programs ===
- Young Marines: A youth program emphasizing the core values of the Marine Corps.
- U.S. Marines Youth Physical Fitness Program: For elementary and high school students.
- Boy Scouts of America: One of the largest youth organizations in the United States.
- Scholarship program: Provides academic scholarships to children of Marines and former Marines.
- Toys for Tots: A program of the U.S. Marine Reserve.

=== Veterans benefits ===
- Legislative program: Participates in national and state issues which impact the military and veterans programs.
- Veterans Service Officer Program: Assist with claims resulting from active duty service.
- Veterans Affairs Volunteer Service Program: Volunteer assistance in VA hospitals and clinics.

=== Miscellaneous ===
- Military Order of the Devil Dogs: Fun and honor society of the MCL.

== Publication ==
Initially, the official bulletin of the League was the Leatherneck magazine, which carried League news in every issue and had a circulation of over 5,200. Through the magazine and the recruiting services of the Marine Corps, information about the League's activities was disseminated with the hope of building the Marine Corps Reserve to an appreciable size.

Eventually, the League would produce its own official publication, Semper Fi magazine, but the League is allowed to contribute articles to Leatherneck magazine. Semper Fi magazine is published on a quarterly basis.

== Organization ==
The Marine Corps League is headed by an elected National Commandant, with 14 elected national staff officers who serve as trustees. The National Board of Trustees coordinates the efforts of 48 department, or state, entities and the activities of over 1,000 community-based detachments located throughout the United States and overseas. The day-to-day operations of the League are under the control of the National Executive Director/Chief Operating Officer, with the responsibility for the management and direction of all programs, activities and affairs as well the supervision of the national headquarters staff.

=== National ===
The prime authority of the League is derived from its congressional charter and from its annual national convention held each August in a different major U.S. city. It is a not-for-profit organization within the provisions of the Internal Revenue Service Code 501(c) (4). A special group exemption letter allows contributions to the Marine Corps League, its auxiliary and subsidiary units to be tax deductible by the donor.

=== Divisions ===
For more effective administration, the United States is divided into geographical units called divisions whose function is solely administrative. The duties and authority of the national vice commandants of divisions are covered in the national bylaws. The divisions of the Marine Corps League are:

MARINE CORPS LEAGUE DIVISIONS
Central	Mideast	Midwest	New England	Northeast	Northwest	Rocky Mountain	Southeast	Southern	Southwest

- (1) Central Division - Michigan, Ohio, Indiana, Illinois, Wisconsin, Kentucky
- (2) Mideast Division - Virginia, West Virginia, North Carolina, Delaware, Maryland, District of Columbia, Virgin Islands, Puerto Rico, Saudi Arabia, United Kingdom
- (3) Midwest Division - Missouri, Iowa, Kansas, Minnesota, Nebraska, North Dakota, South Dakota
- (4) New England Division - Maine, New Hampshire, Vermont, Massachusetts, Connecticut, Rhode Island
- (5) Northeast Division - New Jersey, New York, Pennsylvania
- (6) Northwest Division - Alaska, Washington, Montana, Oregon, Idaho
- (7) Rocky Mountain Division - Colorado, Utah, New Mexico, Wyoming
- (8) Southeast Division - Alabama, Florida, Georgia, South Carolina, Mississippi, Louisiana, Tennessee
- (9) Southern Division - Oklahoma, Texas, Arkansas
- (10) Southwest Division - Arizona, California, Nevada, Hawaii

=== Departments ===
A State in which there are three or more Detachments with a combined membership of sixty (60) or more members may be chartered as a Department by the National Board of Trustees upon receiving a written request from such Detachments via the jurisdictional National Division Vice Commandant.

=== Area ===
The function of an Area is administrative only and is formed at the discretion of the Department. The Area Vice Commandant will be responsible for the Area.

=== Detachments ===
The Detachment is the basic unit of the League and usually represents a small geographic area such as a single town or part of a county. There are over 1000 community-based Detachments located throughout the United States and overseas, supporting veterans and their families while being active and involved in the local community. The Detachment is used for formal business such as meetings and a coordination point for community service projects. A Detachment member is distinguished by a Red garrison cap with gold piping.

== Notable members ==
- Sidney W. Brewster
- Rev. John H. Clifford
- James G. Harbord
- Frank X. Lambert
- John A. Lejeune
- Ray C. Sawyer
- Milton Solomon

== List of Past National Commandants and Convention Sites ==
MARINE CORPS VETERANS ASSOCIATION
NATIONAL COMMANDANT AND CONFERENCE SITE
No.	Date	Site	Commandant
1	November 10, 1922	New York, NY	*Sidney W. Brewster

MARINE CORPS LEAGUE
NATIONAL COMMANDANTS AND CONVENTION SITES
No.	Year	Site	Commandant
1	1923	New York, NY	*John A. Lejeune
2	1924	Washington, DC	*John A. Lejeune
3	1925	Philadelphia, PA	*John A. Lejeune
4	1926	Cleveland, OH	*John A. Lejeune
5	1927	Erie, PA	*John A. Lejeune
6	1928	Dallas, TX	*John A. Lejeune
7	1929	Cincinnati, OH	*John A. Lejeune
			*Wendell C. Neville
8	1930	St Louis, MO	*W. Karl Lations
9	1931	Buffalo, NY	*W. Karl Lations
	1932	NO CONVENTION	*Carlton A. Fisher
10	1933	Chicago, IL	*Carlton A. Fisher
11	1934	Denver, CO	*Carlton A. Fisher
12	1935	Newark, NJ	*John F. Manning
13	1936	Boston, MA	*John F. Manning
14	1937	Akron, OH	*Maurice A. Illich
15	1938	Washington, DC	*Maurice A. Illich
16	1939	Boston, MA	*Florence O'Leary
17	1940	Detroit, MI	*Florence O'Leary
18	1941	Indianapolis, IN	*Chris Cunningham
19	1942	Chicago, IL	*Chris Cunningham
20	1943	New York, NY	*Alexander Ormsby
21	1944	Sacramento, CA	*Thomas E. Wood
22	1945	Springfield, IL	*Alan A. Stevenson
23	1946	Atlantic City, NJ	*Thomas F. Sweeny
24	1947	Miami, Fl	*Joseph F. Alverez
25	1948	Milwaukee, WI	*George T. Bullen
26	1949	Boston, MA	*Theus J. McQueen
27	1950	Washington, DC	*Clay Nixon
28	1951	Savannah, GA	*Maurice J. Fagan
29	1952	Los Angeles, CA	*John C. O'Brien
30	1953	Cleveland, OH	*John C. O'Brien
31	1954	Baltimore, MD	*Charles A. Weaver
32	1955	St Louis, MO	*George Shamgochian
33	1956	Miami, FL	*William D. Webster
34	1957	San Jose, CA	*William Derderian
35	1958	Omaha, NE	*John G. Hosko
36	1959	Buffalo, NY	*William Gardiner
37	1960	Grand Rapids, MI	*Hyman Rosen
38	1961	Atlantic City, NJ	*Walter Churchill Sr.
39	1962	Tampa, FL	*Wilson L. Peck
40	1963	Cleveland, OH	*Raymond B. Butts
41	1964	Wichita, KS	*Raymond B. Butts
42	1965	Harrisburg, PA	*Burton Daugherty
43	1966	Albany, NY	*Burton Daugherty
44	1967	Kansas City, MO	*Claude H. Downing
45	1968	Bridgeport, CT	*Claude H. Downing
46	1969	Miami, FL	*Edward J. Bange
47	1970	St Louis, MO	*Edward J. Bange
48	1971	San Antonio, TX	*Sydney S. McMath
49	1972	Anaheim, CA	*H. Lynn Cavin
50	1973	Miami, FL	*Gilbert E. Gray
51	1974	Tucson, AZ	*Gilbert E. Gray
52	1975	Philadelphia, PA	*Richard J. O'Brien
53	1976	Washington, DC	*Patrick J. Cody
54	1977	Indianapolis, IN	*Edward A. Schramm
55	1978	Atlantic City, NJ	*James H. Frost
56	1979	Milwaukee, WI	*James H. Frost
57	1980	Orlando, FL	Paul F. Hastings
58	1981	Tucson, AZ	Paul F. Hastings
59	1982	Dearborn, MI	*Joseph Mammone
60	1983	Nashville, TN	*James C. Kelly
61	1984	Colorado Springs, CO	*James C. Kelly
62	1985	Lafayette, LA	*Robert N. Forsyth
63	1986	Boston, MA	*Edward D. MacIntyre
64	1987	Phoenix, AZ	*William J. Galvin
65	1988	Cincinnati, OH	*William J. Galvin
66	1989	Dallas, TX	Linwood P. Liner
67	1990	Sacramento, CA	*Raymond R. Berling
68	1991	King of Prussia, PA	*Raymond R. Berling
69	1992	St Louis, MO	*Lamar Golden
70	1993	Orlando, FL	*Lamar Golden
71	1994	Cherry Hill, NJ	*Francis J. Meakem
72	1995	Milwaukee, WI	Lewis W. Loeven
73	1996	Fort Mitchell, KY	*PAULA’s J. Seton
74	1997	Nashville, TN	*Paul J. Seton
75	1998	Syracuse, NY	Robert E. Becker Jr
76	1999	Denver, CO	Robert E. Becker Jr
77	2000	New Orleans, LA	Diana Dils
78	2001	Dearborn, MI	*Diana Dils
79	2002	Harrisburg, PA	John P. Tuohy
80	2003	Spokane, WA	John P. Tuohy
81	2004	Irving, TX	Helen F. Hicks
82	2005	Cleveland, OH	Helen F. Hicks
83	2006	Quincy, MA	*Frank S. Kish
84	2007	Albuquerque, NM	John V. Ryan
85	2008	Orlando, FL	John V. Ryan
86	2009	Rochester, MN	*James R. Laskey
87	2010	Greensboro, NC	*James R. Laskey
88	2011	Boise, ID	Vito Voltaggio
89	2012	Mobile, AL	Vito Voltaggio
90	2013	Grand Rapids, MI	James Tuohy
91	2014	Charleston, WV	James Tuohy
92	2015	Scottsdale, AZ	*John W. Kovalcik
93	2016	Tulsa, OK	*Richard D. Gore, Sr.
94	2017	Overland Park, Kansas	*Richard D. Gore, Sr.
95	2018	Buffalo, NY	Wendell Webb
96	2019	Billings, Montana	Wendell Webb
	2020	NO CONVENTION	Dennis Tobin
97	2021	Springfield, Illinois	Johnny Baker
98	2022	Daytona Beach Florida	Johnny Baker
99	2023	Oklahoma City Oklahoma	Warren Griffin
100	2024	Palm Springs California	TJ Morgan

- Deceased

== List of Honorary Past National Commandants Of The Marine Corps League ==
HONORARY PAST NATIONAL COMMANDANTS OF THE MARINE CORPS LEAGUE
Year	Name
1945	*Stephen Brown
1958	*Basil Pollitt
1965	*Francis X. Lorbecki
1978	*Jack Brennan
1987	*Clem D. Russell
1995	*Victor T. Fisher
1995	*Charles D. Horn
1996	*Raymond R. Wilkowski
1998	*Johanna Glasrud
1999	*John "Jay" P. Kacsan
1999	*William "Bill" R. Reichstein
2001	*Benny Dotson
2007	Barry Georgopulos
2009	E. "Bud" Randall
2009	*John D. Serpa
2010	Michael A. Blum
2019	Neil B. Corley

- Deceased

== List of Military Order Of Devil Dogs (Founded 1939 Boston, Massachusetts) ==
MILITARY ORDER OF DEVIL DOGS (FOUNDED 1939 BOSTON, MA)
Year	Chief Devil Dog	Year	Kennel Dog Robber
39-41	*Gerald L. Bakelaar	39-40	*Charles Vaccaro
40-41		40-41	*Raymond Canfield
41-43	*C. A. Gallagher	41-43	*Erastas Darling
43-44	*Joseph T. Alvarez	43-44	*Eugene P. Corey
44-45	*Walter Donnelly	44-45	*John Zak
45-46	*Clarence G. Young	45-46	*#John Van de Woude
46-47	*John Zakroczymski Jr.	46-47	*Mortimer S. Libien
47-48	*#John Van de Woude	47-48	*Clarence G. Young
48-49	*Joseph Probst	48-49	*John L. Baker
49-50	*Carl "Art" Burger	49-50	*Betty J. Money
50-51	*Francis X. Lorbecki	50-51	*Paul Corbin
51-52	*Stanley Bunn	51-52	*#Charles A. Hellyer
52-53	*#Charles A. Hellyer	52-53	*#George W. Jorgenson
53-54	*#George W. Jorgenson	53-54	*William W. Hurrell
54-55	*William Harvey	54-55	*Joseph L.T. Fortier
55-56	*William S. Craig	55-56	*Hyman Rosen
56-58	*Mason D. Wade	56-58	*#Claude H. Downing
58-59	*#Claude H. Downing	58-59	*James T. Fowler
59-60	*James Koenig	59-60	*Paul Plache
60-61	*William Hurrell	60-61	*H. E. Allamon
61-63	*John P. Kacsan	61-63	*H. E. Allamon
63-64	*Joseph Peterson	63-64	*H. E. Allamon
64-65	*John R. Spain	64-65	*John J. McNamara
65-66	*Arthur M. Brokenshire, Jr.	65-66	*Steven Downey
66-67	*John J. McNamara	66-67	*#Marshall Lundgren
67-68	*#Marshall D. Lundgren	67-68	*John J. McNamara
68-69	*#Hugh A. Maus	68-69	*#Antoinette H. Baisden
69-70	*Philip A. Calabrese	69-70	*#Antoinette H. Baisden
70-71	*#Antoinette H. Baisden	70-71	*James J. Armstrong
71-72	*James J. Armstrong	71-72	*#Hugh A. Maus
72-73	*#C. A. Boedigheimer	72-73	*#Virginia L. McDougall
73-75	*#Virginia McDougall	73-75	*#C. A. Boedigheimer
75-76	*#Jack R. Liddell	75-76	*Manuel Valdez
76-78	*#William H. Brooks	76-78	*#Kenneth E. Farris
78-79	*#Fred Agosta	78-79	*#Kenneth E. Farris
79-80	*#Kenneth E. Farris	79-80	*Raymond E. Kania
80-82	*#Edwin F. Gallagher	80-82	#Paul L. Sutton
82-84	#Paul L. Sutton	82-84	John C. Muerdler
84-85	*#Gilbert E. Gray	84-85	*#Edwin F. Gallagher
85-86	*Francis A. English	85-86	*#Kenneth E. Farris
86-87	*Donald L. Frost	86-87	*#Kenneth E. Farris
87-88	*Thomas A. Banks	87-88	*#Kenneth E. Farris
88-90	*Mary B. Krauss (Hensley)	88-90	*#Kenneth E. Farris
90-92	Clifton F. Williams, Jr.	90-92	*#Kenneth E. Farris
92-94	*Gary O. Chartrand	92-94	*#Kenneth E. Farris
94-96	William C. Taylor	94-96	*#Kenneth E. Farris
96-98	*Jack Nash	96-98	*#Kenneth E. Farris
98-00	*Lamar Golden	98-00	*Robert McCallum
00-02	*Robert Lent	00-02	*#Phil Ruhmshottel
02-04	Douglas Fisk	02-04	*#Phil Ruhmshottel
04-05	George Barrows	04-05	*#Phil Ruhmshottel
05-07	Donald R. Garland Jr.	05-07	*#Phil Ruhmshottel
07-09	Laurel A. Hull	07-09	Steven Joppa
09-11	*#Phil Rumshottel	09-11	Steven Joppa
11-13	Michael English	13-Nov	Steven Joppa
13-14	*Ken Travis	13-14	Steven Joppa
14-15	Leanna L. Dietrich	14-15	Steven Joppa
15-17	C. O. Smith	15-17	Steven Joppa
17-19	Leonard Spicer	17-19	Steven Joppa
19-22	Thomas Hazlett	19-22	Steven Joppa
22-24	Alan Sanning	22-24	Janice Hartley
24-25	*Jeffrey D. Jones	24-25	Helen Breen
25-	Joesph DeAngelo	25-	Helen Breen

- * Deceased
1. who also served as a Kennel Dog Robber

== See also ==
- Museum of the Marine
