= David Jonas =

American lawyer

General Counsel at the National Nuclear Security Administration
- President: George W. Bush

Personal details
- Education: Denison University (B.A.); Wake Forest University (J.D.); The JAG School (LL.M.); Georgetown University (LL.M.); Naval War College (M.A.)
- Awards: Defense Meritorious Service Medal

David S. Jonas is a United States Marine, lawyer, government official, and a partner at Fluet. In 2017, he was nominated by President Donald Trump to become general counsel at the United States Department of Energy. Jonas withdrew from consideration in January 2018. He served for twenty years in the United States Marine Corps. Jonas was the Pentagon's nuclear nonproliferation planner for the Joint Chiefs of Staff prior to being the general counsel of the National Nuclear Security Administration and the Defense Nuclear Facilities Safety Board. He was awarded the Defense Meritorious Service Medal for his work with the Joint Chiefs from 1997 to 2001.

== Background ==
Jonas is from Elkins Park, Pennsylvania. He received a B.A. degree from Denison University in Granville, Ohio and his JD from Wake Forest University School of Law in Winston-Salem, North Carolina. He later attended the U.S. Army JAG School in Charlottesville, where he received his LLM degree.

== Legal career ==
Jonas is an adjunct professor at Georgetown Law and George Washington University Law School. He is on the board of directors of the Naval War College Foundation, the Young Marines, and the Marine Executive Association. He is a member of the American Bar Association Advisory Committee on Law and National Security and the Advisory Committee of the University of Pennsylvania Law School's Center for Ethics and the Rule of Law. While serving in the Marine Corps, Jonas argued Davis v. United States before the United States Supreme Court, becoming the first judge advocate in the history of the Army, Navy, Marine Corps, and Air Force to appear before the U.S. Supreme Court.

Jonas was nominated by President Trump to become General Counsel at the Department of Energy on May 25, 2017. The nomination was reported favorably by the Committee on Energy and Natural Resources on September 19, 2017, but was never considered by the full Senate. It was returned unconfirmed to the president by the Senate on January 3, 2018, under Standing Rules of the United States Senate, Rule XXXI, paragraph 6. Before his nomination could be resubmitted, Jonas announced that he was withdrawing from consideration.
