= Young Marines =

Youth organization

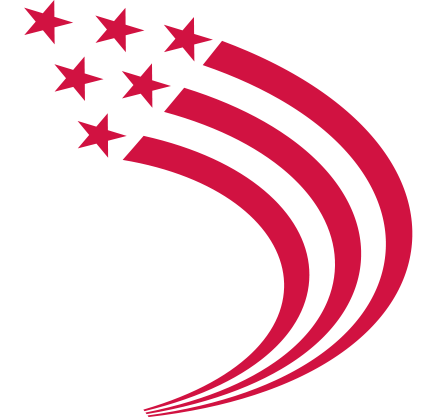
- Official logo of Young Marines, Inc.
- Founded: 1959; 67 years ago
- Country: United States of America
- Size: 238 units 6,100 Young Marines; 2,100 adult volunteers

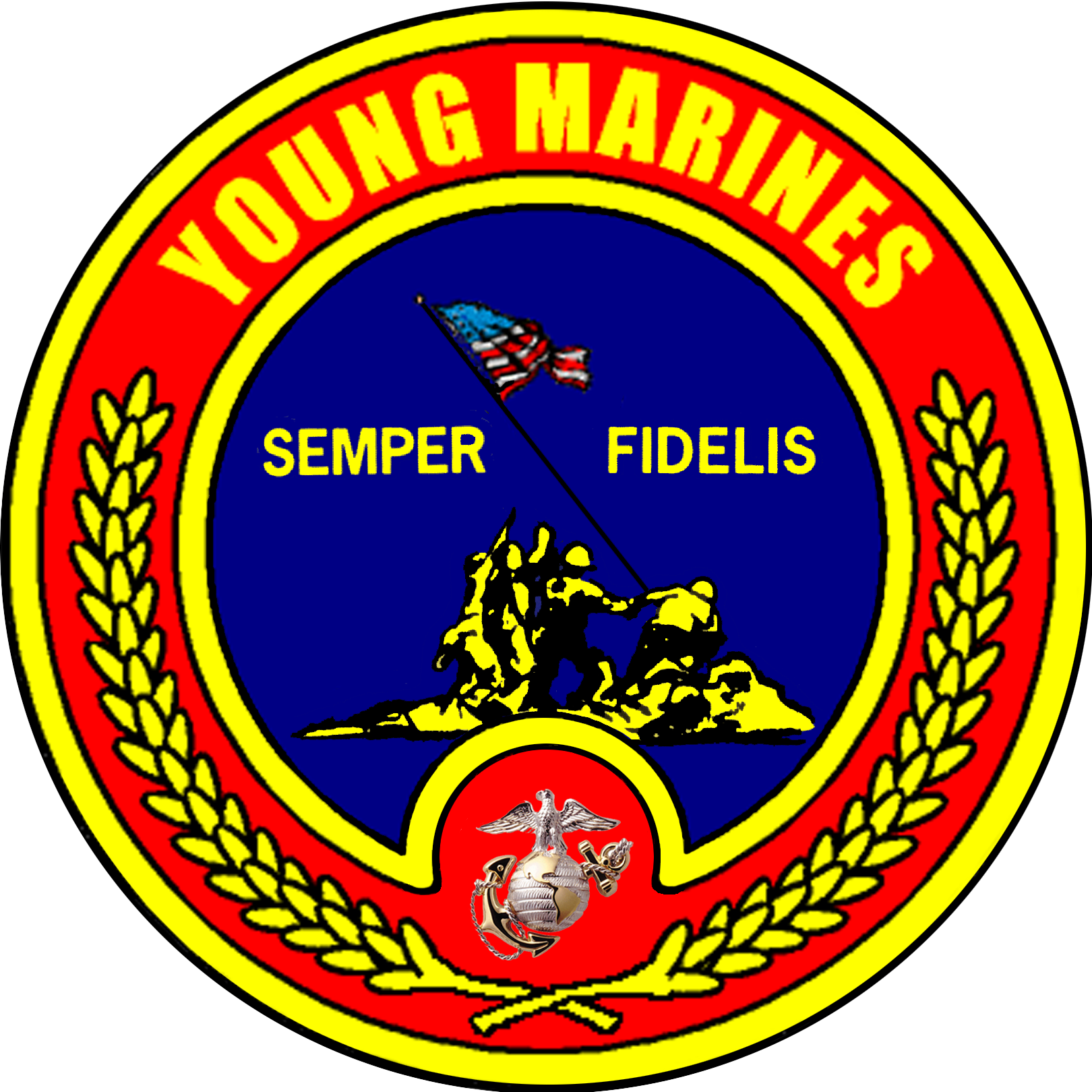
Young Marines Logo, used as uniform device.

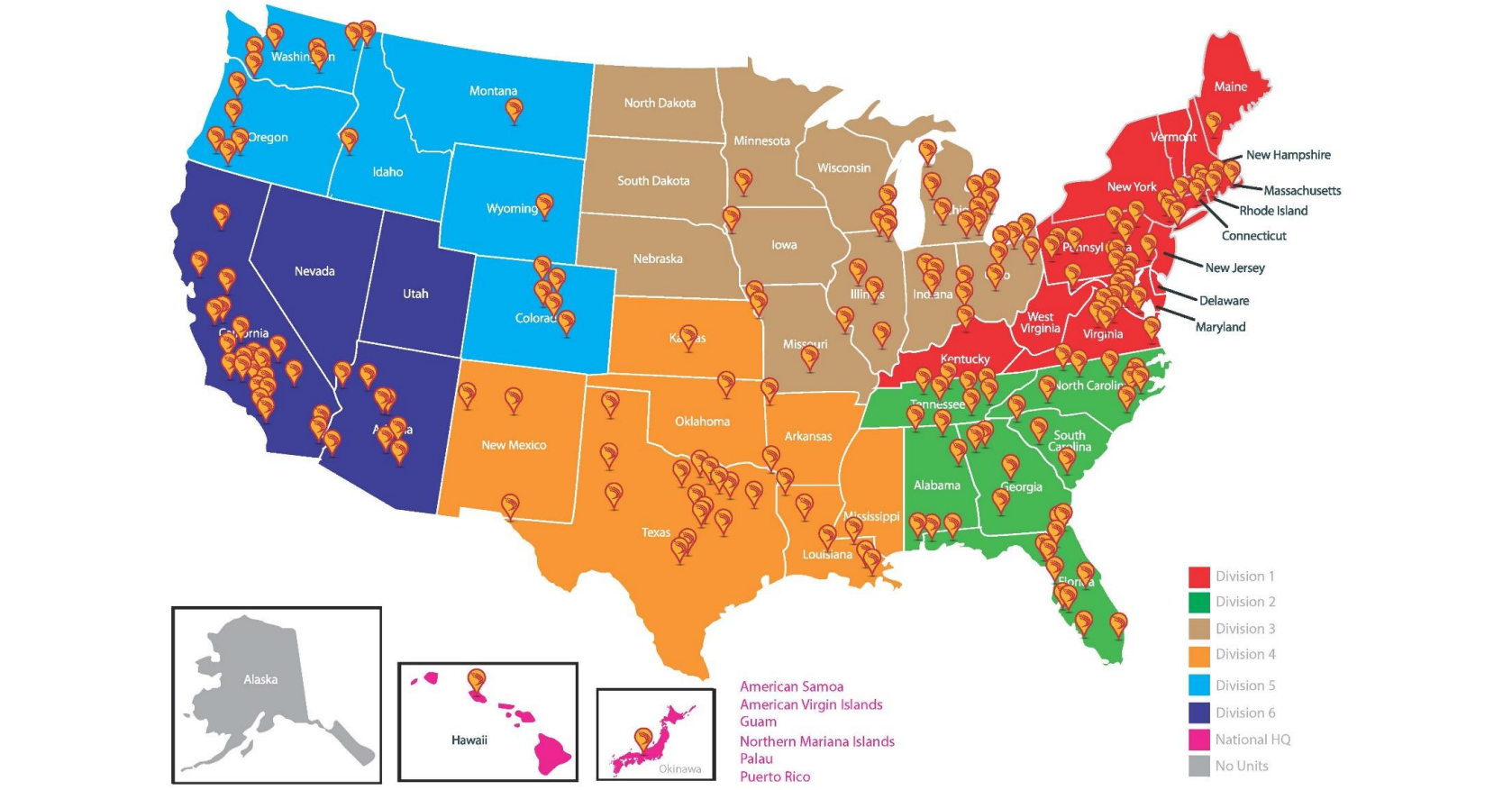
Map Of The Young Marine Units And Divisions

The Young Marines is a youth program in the United States and Japan open to youth between the ages of 8 and 18 or high school graduation (whichever is later, not to exceed 20 years of age). It has been awarded the United States Department Of Defense's Fulcrum Shield Award 12 times, with the last one awarded in 2022. A documentary released in 2019, but filmed much earlier (somewhere between 2008 and 2010) The Recruits, has brought the Young Marines under renewed scrutiny

== Organization ==
Young Marines training in Okinawa

The Young Marines was founded in 1959, by the Brass City detachment of the Marine Corps League in Waterbury, CT. The Young Marines received its charter on October 17, 1965, and continued its affiliation with the MCL as well as becoming US Marine Corps drug demand reduction program for youth in July 1993. In 1975, the Young Marines extended its membership to females, and in 1995, the program went international with units in Okinawa, Japan. The Young Marine program was awarded the Fulcrum Shield in 2001. This was the first Fulcrum Shield Award ever bestowed.

The Young Marines are different from Junior ROTC units, in that they are not part of a high school and are a 501(c)3 non-profit instead of a government agency. The program is open to children from the ages of eight years old through high school graduation. Most units require an initial registration fee ranging from fifty to two hundred dollars to enroll, with an annual re-registration fee of around fifty dollars a year. Generally, units meet on local military bases or other locations such as American Legion, VFW, Fire or Sheriff Dept. etc. where a building serves as their headquarters and classroom.

The organization has over 235 units with over 6,100 Young Marines and 2,100 adult volunteers in 40 states, the District of Columbia, and affiliates in a host of foreign countries including Japan.

The Young Marines have 6 divisions, each with multiple regiments. The command is from national headquarters, to division, to regiment, to unit. Unit commanders are typically retired or former marines with an honorable discharge, or active duty or reserve marines in good standing, but exceptions can be made on a case-by-case basis.

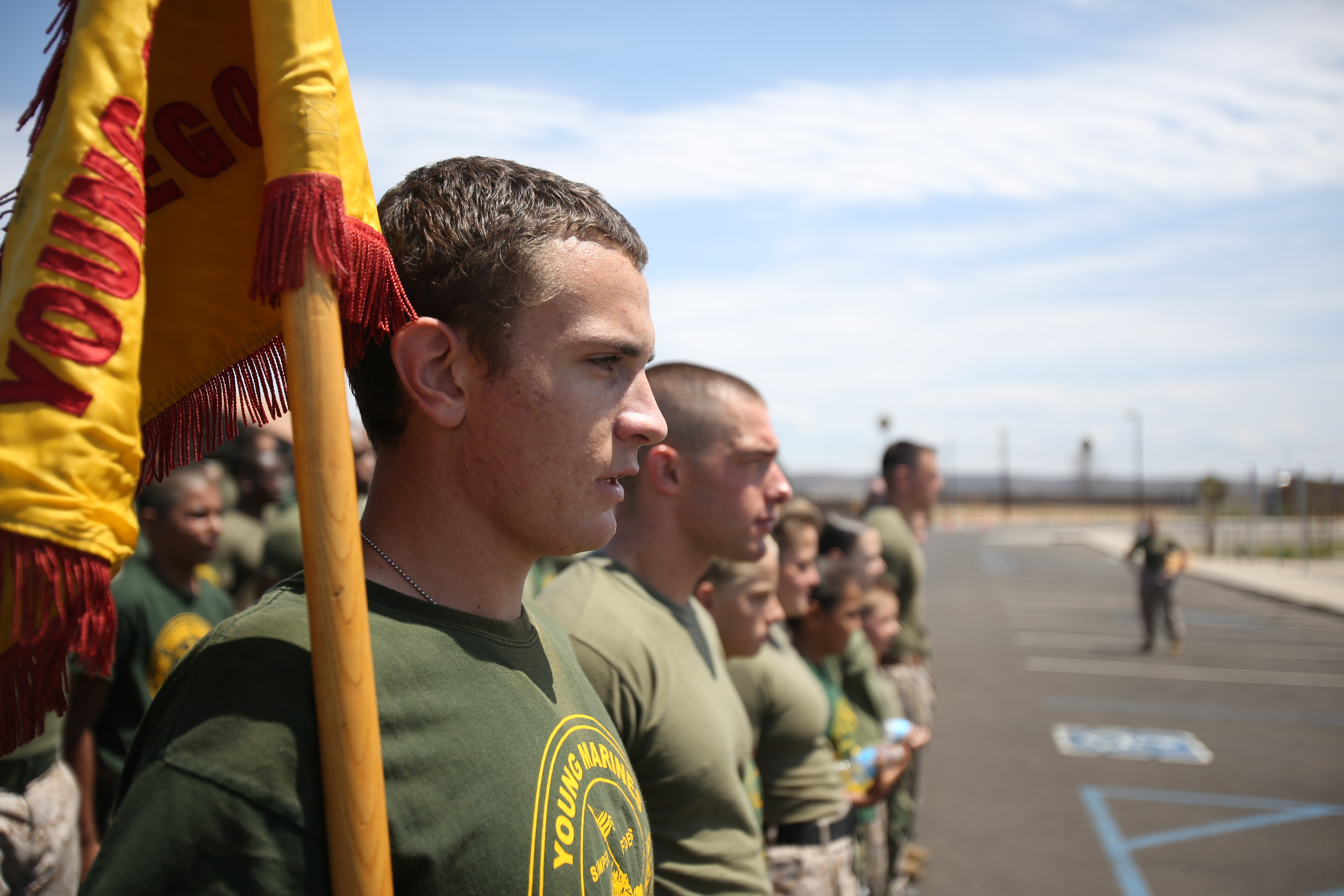
A 15-year-old Young Marine PFC stands as guide for the San Diego Young Marines at a Big Marine Little Marine event.

Young Marines learn survival techniques, physical training, hiking, swimming, rock climbing, rappelling, scuba diving, etc. depending upon the geographic location of the unit, and undergo leadership training, such as Junior Leadership School, Senior Leadership School, and Advanced Leadership School. Most schools are done at Camp Rilea in Oregon for Nationals, but some regiments, or divisions will do smaller leadership schools. Young Marines also learn close order drill based on the U.S. Marine Corps and practice those skills in community parades; some units may have their own drill team.

All units accept new members differently as part of recruit training. Some units train new recruits over a period of several months, led by several recruit instructors (RI's), while other units train new members over a course of a few weekend meetings, while at least one unit has a 4-day long encampment for recruit training. At the end of recruit training, members are officially given the title of "Young Marine," are allowed to wear the standard camouflage uniform, and earn the rank of private (those that have not completed recruit training successfully are allowed to take part in most unit activities, but do not hold the rank of private). Honor recruits, recruits that have done exceptionally well during their training period, may begin with the rank of private first class.

== Uniforms ==
The official uniform for the Young Marines program for youth is the civilian version of the digital camouflage blouse and trousers, olive drab name tapes, khaki web belt, black boots, cover, and white crew-neck T-shirt. The new uniform went into effect October 1, 2024 and will be transitioning for 2 years. As for dress uniform, the current dress uniforms allowed are Service Alphas, Bravos, and Charlies. The U.S. Marine Corps Eagle, Globe and Anchor emblem is replaced with a gold Young Marines emblem on all uniforms where an EGA would be used in the USMC. On service uniforms, the garrison cover is the only headgear permitted. Marine Corps dress blues are not authorized for the Young Marines, unlike in the MCJROTC, whose units are allowed to wear modified dress blues "A" and "B" for balls and other formal events.

== Joining ==
Before joining the program, kids learn about it through social media or community events. They visit the Young Marines website to find their nearest unit and fill out medical forms and personal details. Once their application is approved, they receive confirmation from the unit commander along with a request for a fee for uniforms and guidebooks, officially making them a poolee.

Parents then schedule a visit to a drill, where the recruit receives their Red National T-shirt, red cord, and their cover, marking their official entry into the program.

== Rank ==
When Young Marines first join the program they will enter as a recruit, spending anywhere from 3–4 months at that rank. After graduation they are considered a Young Marine Private (Pvt) (unless they receive the title of Honor Recruit, which advances them to the rank of Private first class (PFC). In larger recruit classes, additional recruits can also be promoted to PFC. These meritorious promotions to PFC does not excuse the Young Marine from completing the PFC requirements before earning the next rank. After that, the Young Marine will have to advance to higher rank based on actual rank in the United States Marine Corps. The rank structure, in ascending order, goes as follows: Private (YM/Pvt), Private first class (YM/PFC), Lance Corporal (YM/LCpl), Corporal (YM/Cpl), Sergeant (YM/Sgt), Staff Sergeant (YM/SSgt), Gunnery Sergeant (YM/GySgt), Master Sergeant (YM/MSgt), and then finally to Master Gunnery Sergeant (Ym/MGySgt). After the completion of Master Sergeant (YM/MSgt) you can be billeted as a First Sergeant (YM/1stSgt) or as a Master Gunnery Sergeant (YM/MGySgt) a Young Marine can be billeted as a Sergeant Major (YM/SgtMaj) for a short amount of time.

Young Marines may be billeted with both certain ranks and certain positions. Billeted positions include, but are not limited to, the following: team leader, squad leader, platoon guide, platoon sergeant, platoon leader, unit guide, unit gunnery sergeant, unit first sergeant, and company sergeant major. In some cases, a Young Marine need not have the rank their billet entitles to be granted that billet, such as a Staff Sergeant being able to have the billet of unit Gunnery Sergeant. Billets may also apply to different positions in the organizational structure, from a position within the squad (i.e. squad leader) to the battalion (i.e. battalion sergeant major.) Not all billets may be available, depending upon the size of the unit.

Rank structure of the Young Marines
Insignia	No insignia
Rank	Private	Private first class	Lance corporal	Corporal	Sergeant	Staff sergeant	Gunnery sergeant	Master sergeant	Master gunnery sergeant	First sergeant	Sergeant major
Abbreviation	YM/Pvt	YM/PFC	YM/LCpl	YM/Cpl	YM/Sgt	YM/SSgt	YM/GySgt	YM/MSgt	YM/MGySgt	YM/1stSgt [Billet]	YM/SgtMaj [Billet]

Upon completion of the Young Marines, during an honorable discharge at the end of high school, one may enlist in the U.S. military at the pay-grade of E-2 if the rank of YM/sergeant has been attained in the Young Marines. This typically takes about 3 years.

== Ribbons ==
To show completion of certain requirements, Young Marines are awarded ribbons and devices. There are currently 58 ribbons that can be earned. Every year a Young Marine is chosen for Young Marine of the Year. There are different types of Young Marines of the Year. There is a Unit Young Marine of the Year, Regiment YMOY, Division YMOY, and a National YMOY.

Ribbons are awarded in 4 levels:

- Level 1 – Personal Decorations
- Level 2 – Achievement Awards
- Level 3 – Service Awards
- Level 4 – Qualification Awards
- Distinguished Order of Merit (DOM)

The ribbons awarded to the Young Marines are as follows:

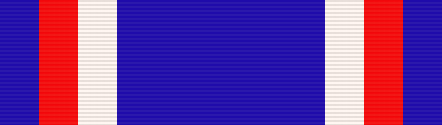

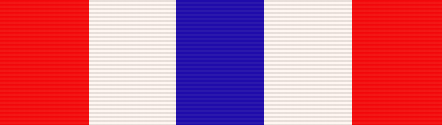

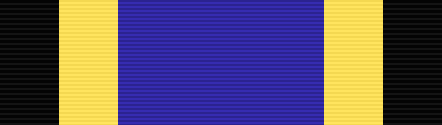

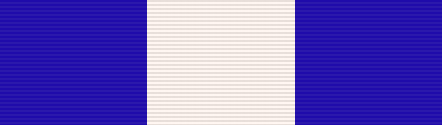

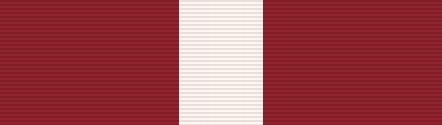

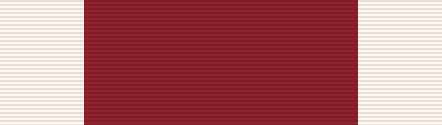

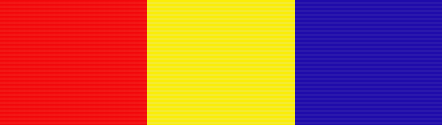

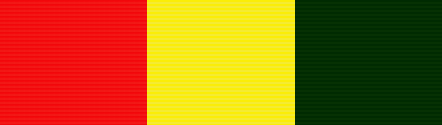

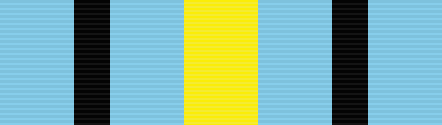

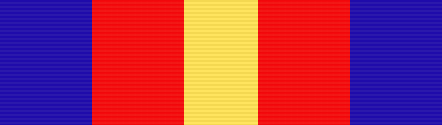

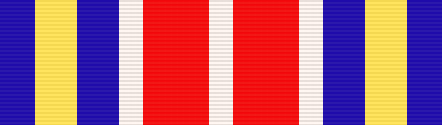

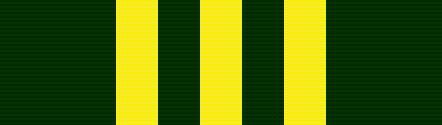

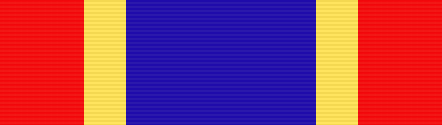

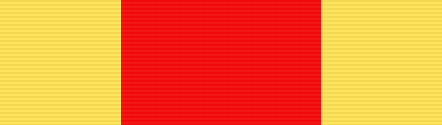

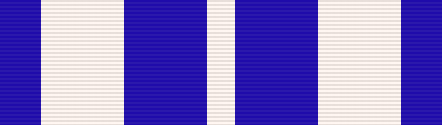

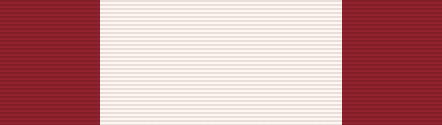

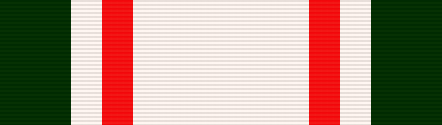

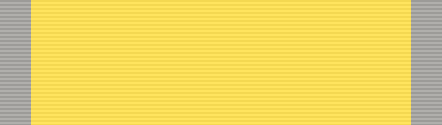

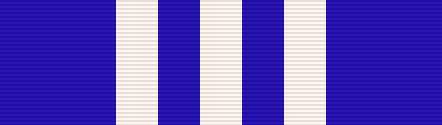

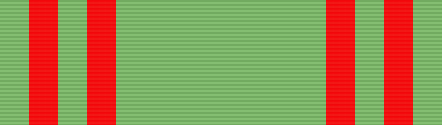

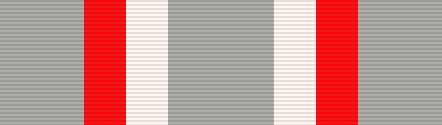

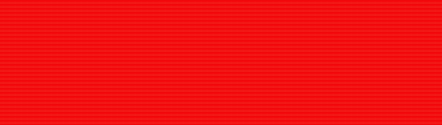

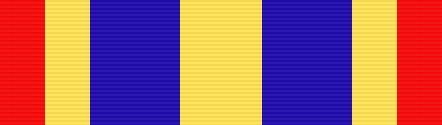

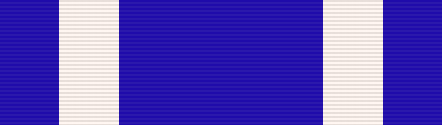

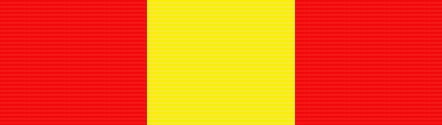

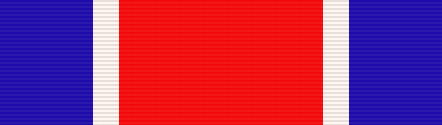

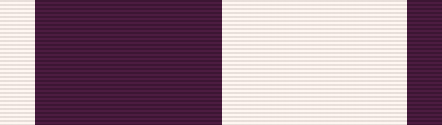

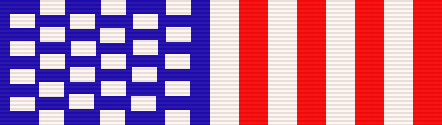

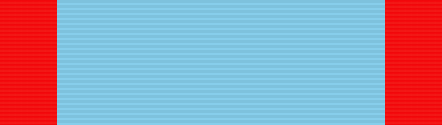

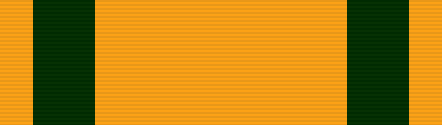

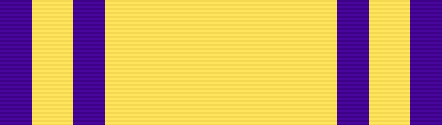

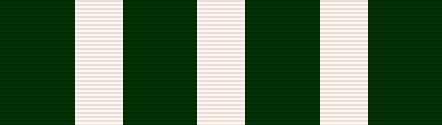

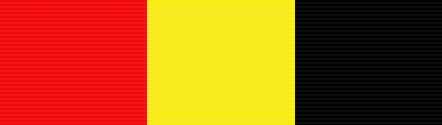

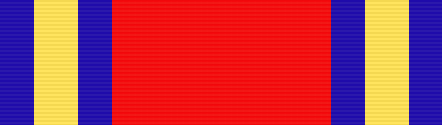

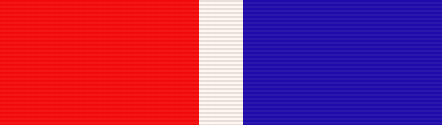

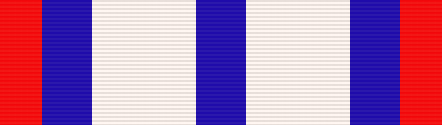

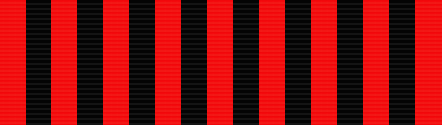

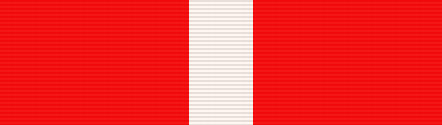

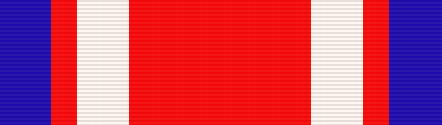

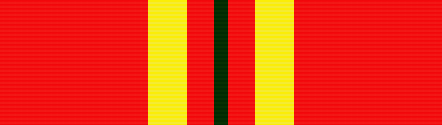

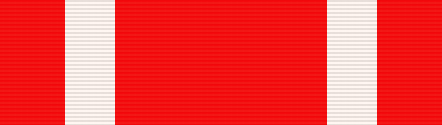

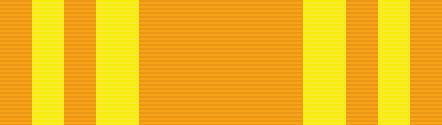

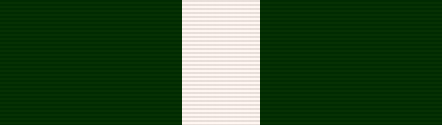

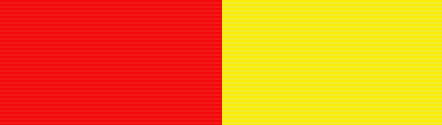

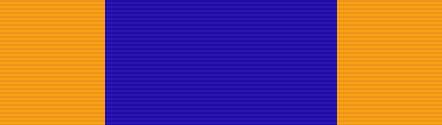

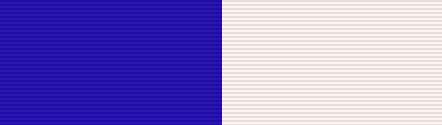

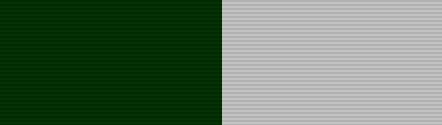

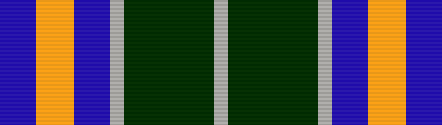

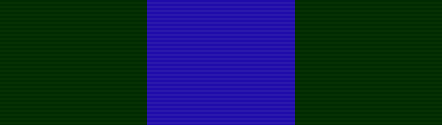

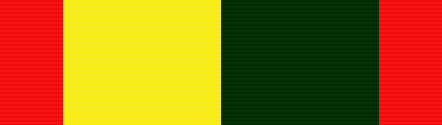

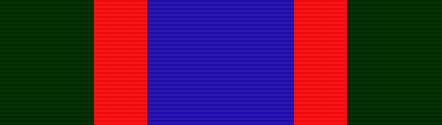

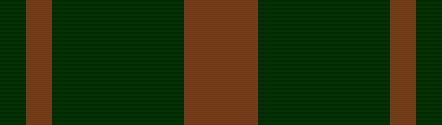

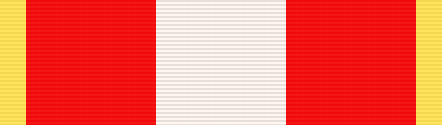

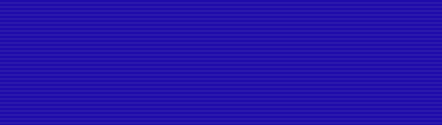

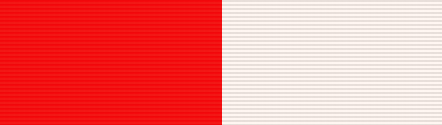

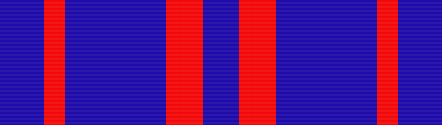

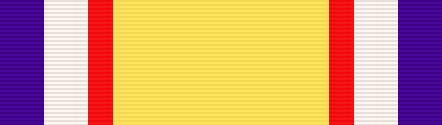

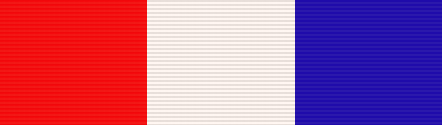

Awards and decorations of the Young Marines
1st row				Distinguished Service Ribbon	Personal Commendation Ribbon			
2nt row	Meritorious Service Ribbon	Lifesaving 1st Degree Ribbon	Lifesaving 2nd Degree Ribbon	Lifesaving 3rd Degree Ribbon	Personal Achievement Ribbon	Young Marine of the Year Ribbon	Commendation of Merit Ribbon	Honor Graduate Ribbon
3rd row	Distinguished Unit Citation Ribbon	Young Marines Unit Commendation Ribbon	Unit of the Year Ribbon	Young Marines Sergeant Major Ribbon	Young Marines First Sergeant Ribbon	Good Conduct Ribbon	Academic Achievement Ribbon	Young Marines Achievement Ribbon
4th row	Salesman of the Year Ribbon	Recruiter of the Year Ribbon	Perfect Physical Fitness Ribbon	Drill Competition Ribbon	Attendance Ribbon	Marine Corps League Unit Commendation Ribbon	Young Marine Staff Ribbon	Color Guard Ribbon
5th row	Unit Chaplain Ribbon	Veterans Appreciation Ribbon	Outstanding Recruiter Ribbon	Outstanding Salesman Ribbon	Drug Demand Reduction Ribbon	Conservation Ribbon	Advanced Leadership Ribbon	Senior Leadership Ribbon
6th row	Junior Leadership Ribbon	Community Service Ribbon	Community Leadership Ribbon	Cardiopulmonary Resuscitation (CPR) Ribbon	Advanced First Aid Ribbon	Physical Fitness Ribbon	Basic First Aid Ribbon	Fire Prevention & Protection Ribbon
7th row	Swimming Ribbon	Sportsmanship Award	Musician Award	Seamanship Ribbon	Scuba Ribbon	Advanced Field Ribbon	Qualified Field Ribbon	Orienteering Ribbon
8th row	Land Navigation Ribbon	Map & Compass Award	Communications Award	Marksmanship Safety Ribbon	Drill Team Ribbon	Young Marines Encampment Ribbon	Organized Unit Trip Ribbon	Basic Ribbon

Roman Numeral 2	Signifies a 2nd class of the Physical Fitness or Swimming ribbon. There is also a Roman Numeral one, which signifies a first class PF or swimming ribbon. You will receive a first class PF ribbon along with the perfect PFT ribbon if you get a 500.

== Gallery ==
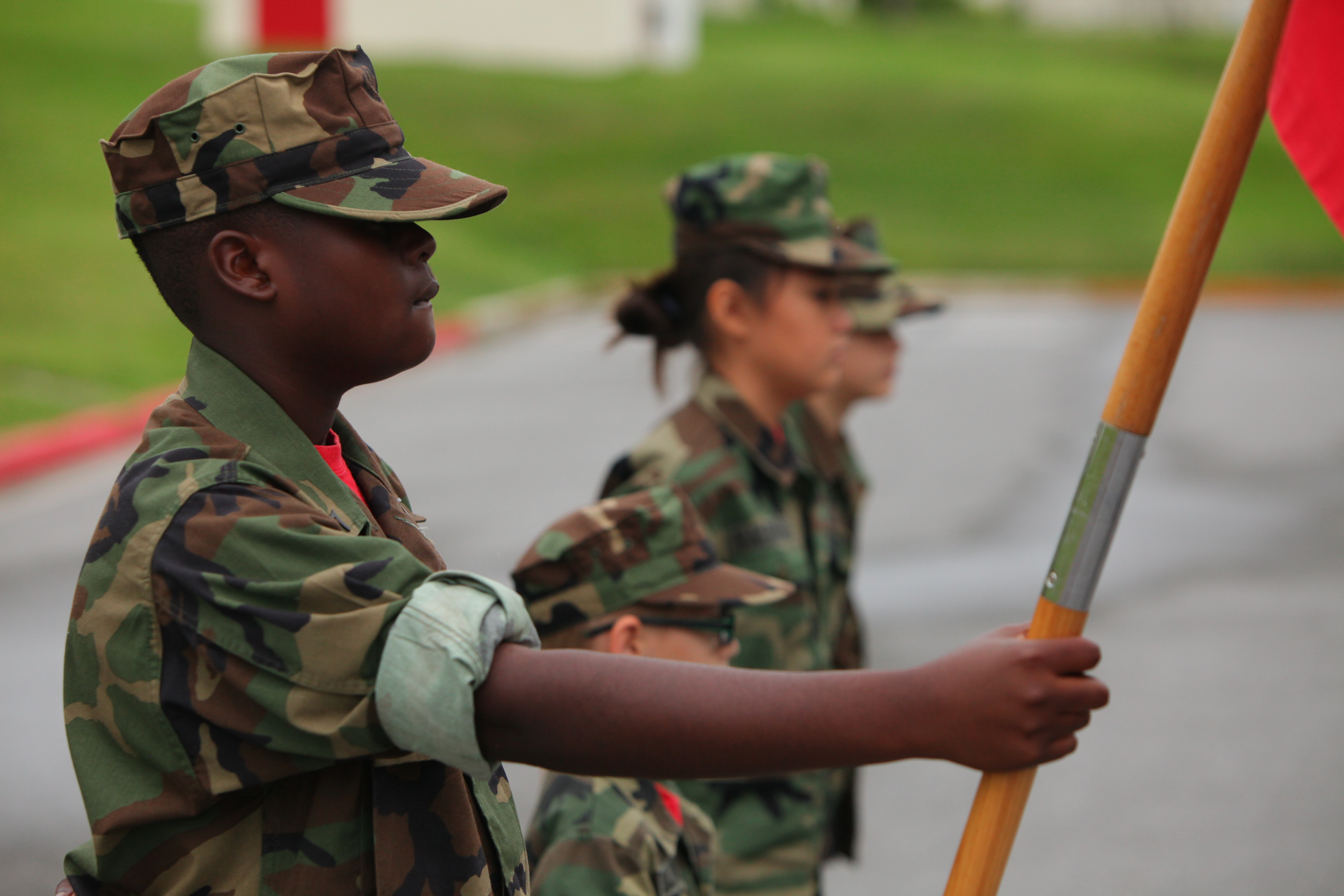
Young Marine PFC Kyle Bryant, an active young Marine, stands at parade rest before a promotion and awards ceremony for active young Marines at the Camp Foster Young Marines building.

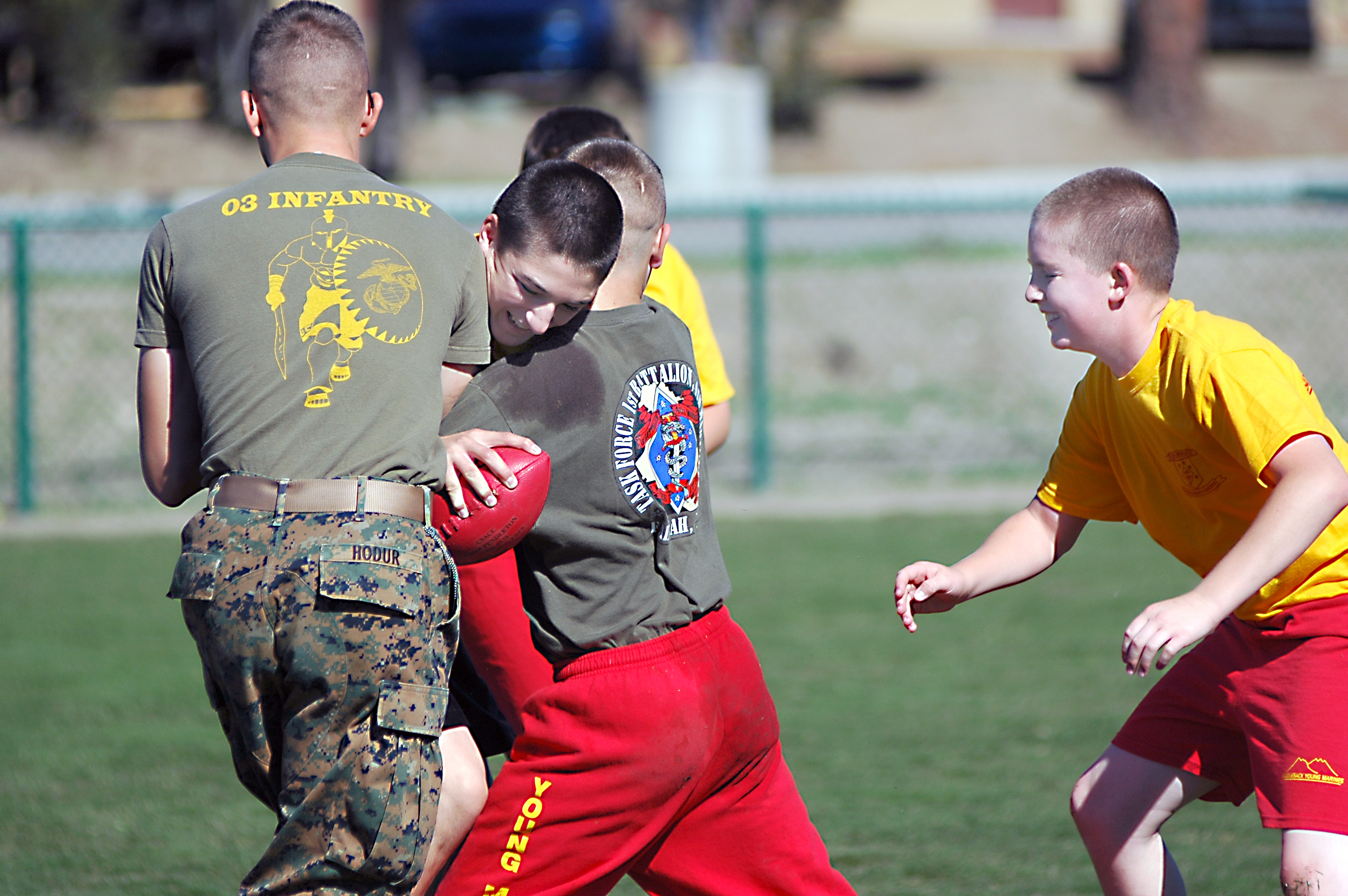
Young Marines of the Saddleback Raiders unit, Camp San Mateo, Marine Corps Base Camp Pendleton, Calif., play two-hand touch football during their day aboard Camp Pendleton.

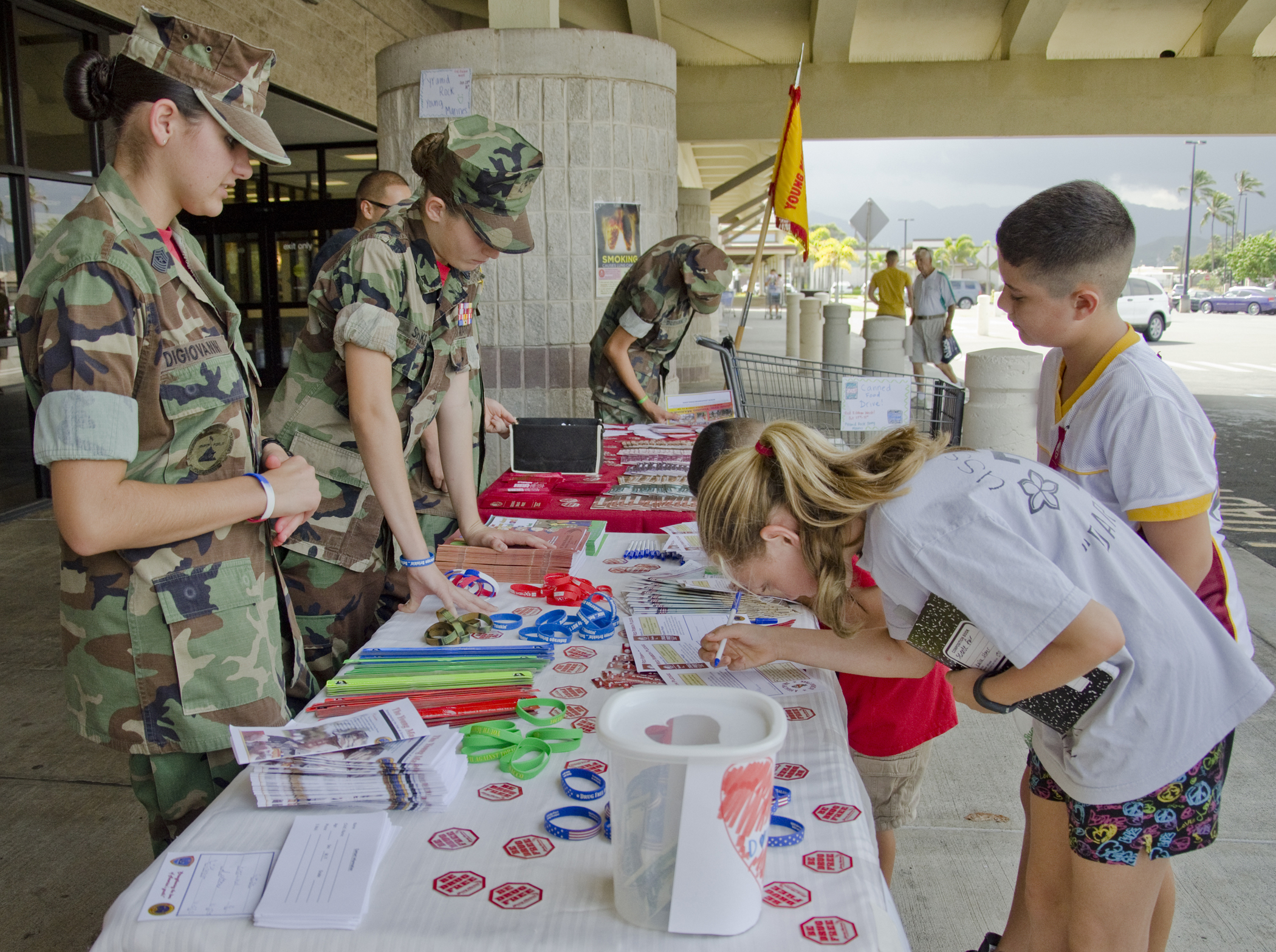
The Pyramid Rock Young Marines encourage military family members to sign pledges to be drug-free.

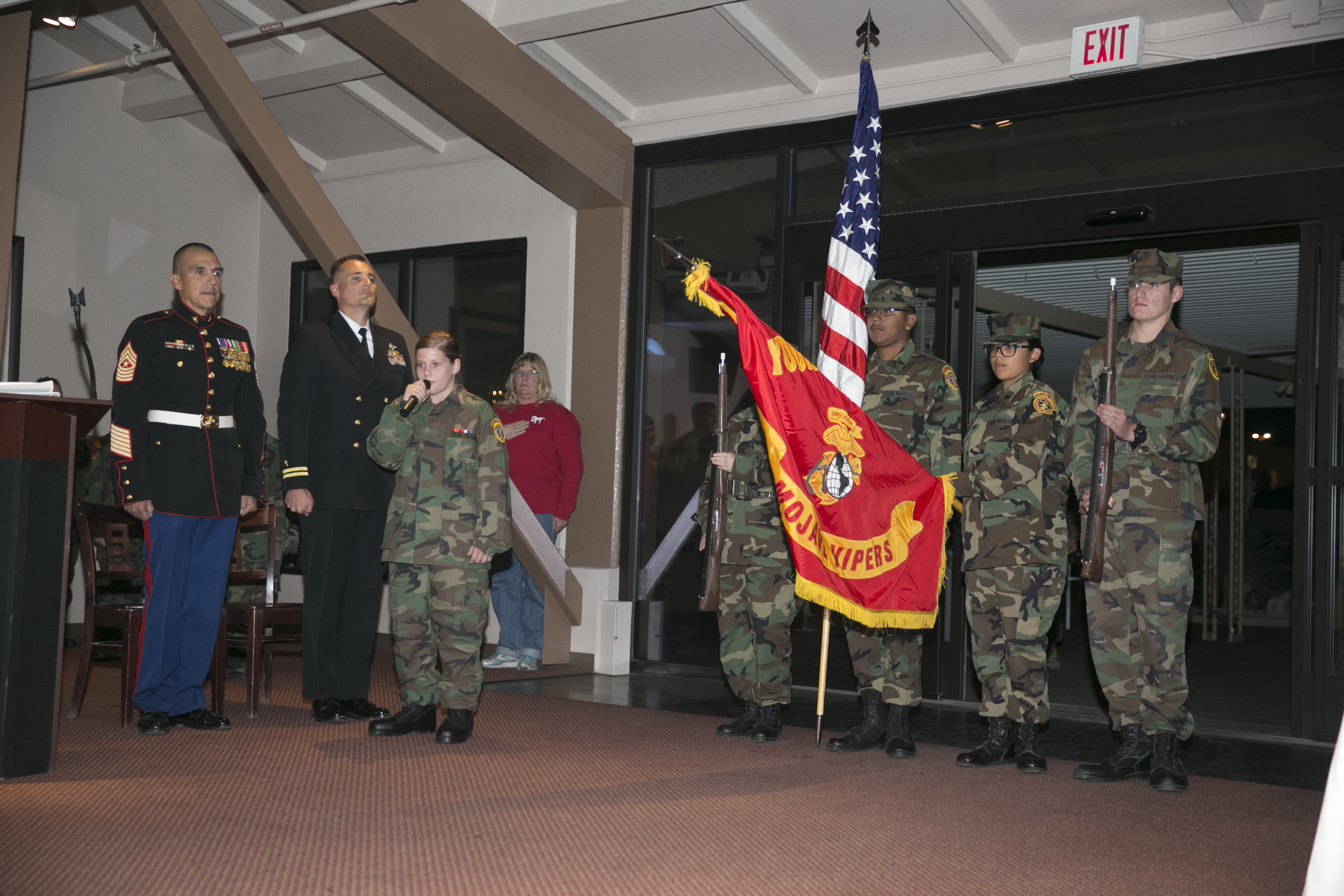
Members of the Mojave Vipers Young Marines present the colors and sing the national anthem.

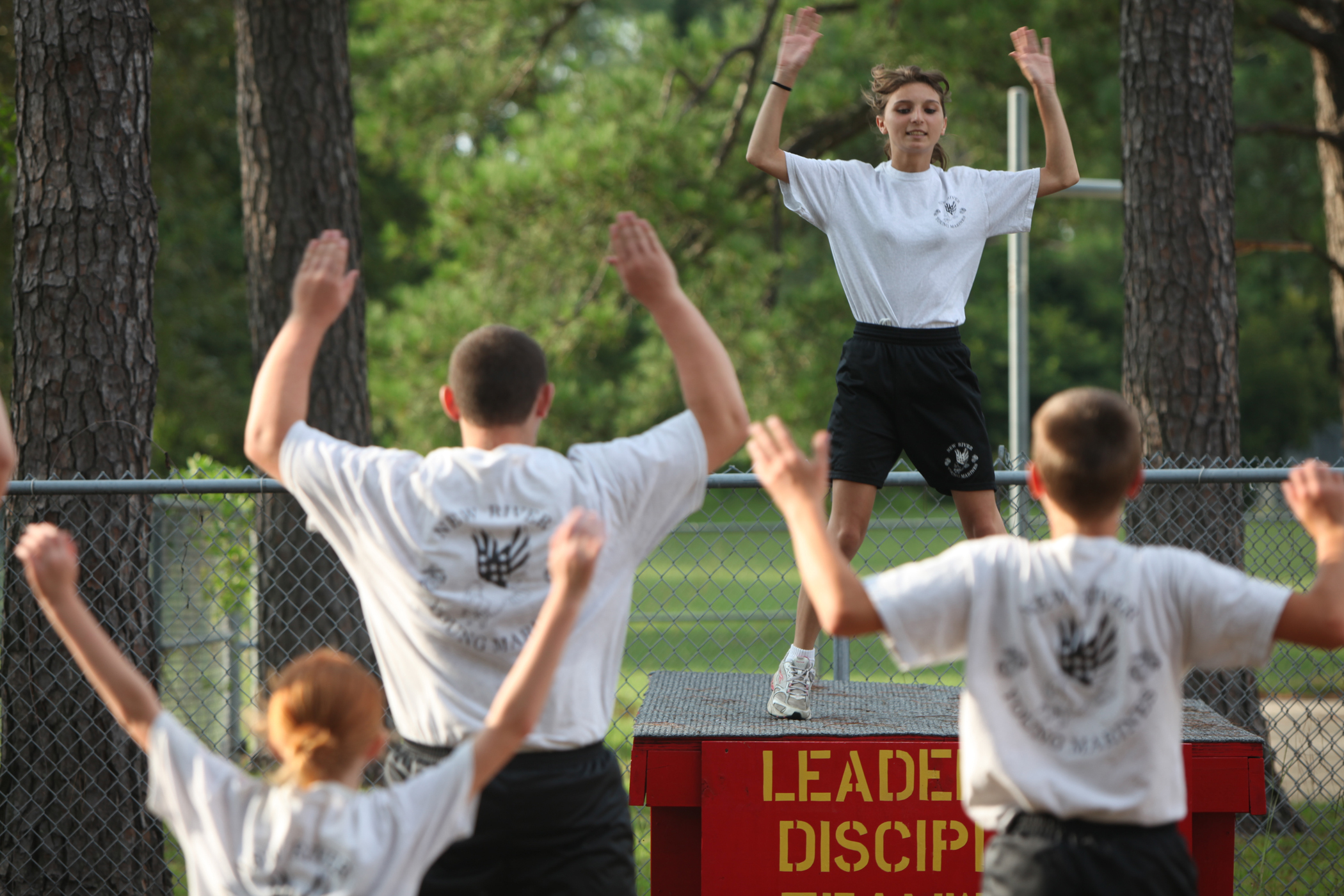
Young Marines from the Young Marine program aboard Marine Corps Air Station New River conduct their daily physical training regimen.

== See also ==
- United States Naval Sea Cadet Corps and Navy League Cadet Corps
- Civil Air Patrol Cadet
- Cadets (youth program)
- Junior Reserve Officers' Training Corps
- Boy Scouts of America
- Royal Marines Cadets, Royal Marines Section Combined Cadet Force and Royal Marines Volunteer Cadet Corps – British equivalents
- California Cadet Corps (CACC)
