= Jonas David Labram =

Swiss botanist, entomologist and illustrator (1785–1852)

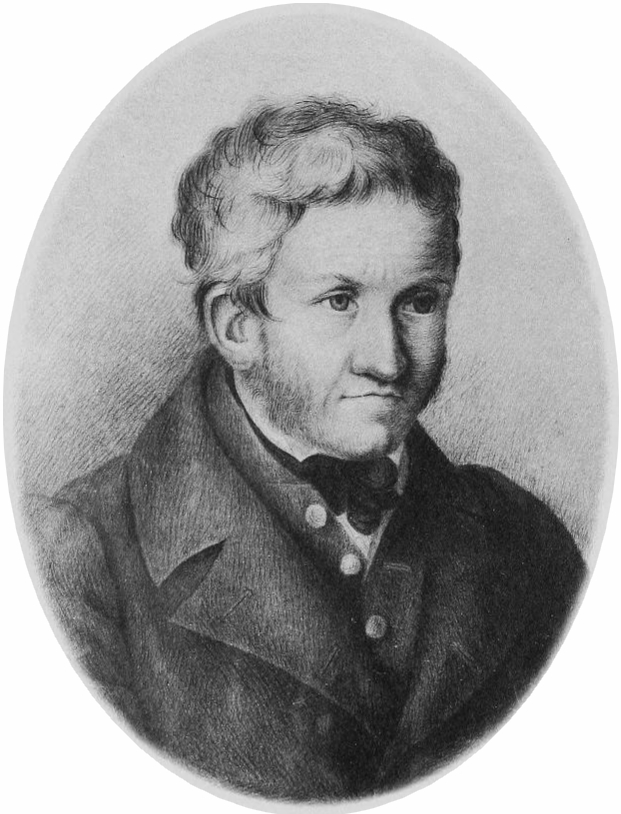

Jonas David Labram (born Labran) (February 3, 1785 – April 3, 1852) was a Swiss botanical illustrator and naturalist. He also contributed entomological illustrations. He discovered several new plants in the Basel region that were included in Carl Friedrich Hagenbach's (1771–1849) flora of the region.

Labram was born Labran in the city of Basel. The family were known for their involvement in the cloth industry in Neuchâtel. In 1715 the widow of Joshua Labran took up bleaching in the Seyon and was supported by the Huguenot J. J. Deluze. The sons later continued the business. Deluze then opened a factory at Cortaillod in 1726, in Cressier and the Bied. The Neuchâtel dyeing industry then grew and spread. Labram grew up in one such family and settled in Chézard-Saint-Martin in the Val-de-Ruz. He took an interest in botany and botanical illustration. His works are widely reprinted without credit to him. An undated book on the poisonous plants of Switzerland by Johannes Jacob Hegetschweiler included 38 plates by Labram. Another work was published in 1842 and marks the end of his botanical illustration era. He then worked with Ludwig Imhoff to produce illustrations of insects. These were hand-colored lithographs. He was also assisted by his daughter Luise. His wife earned money as a laundress and it seems the Labram household was pressed for income. He also taught students including Rudolf Preiswerk (1810–1851) who was a teacher at the local grammar school. He died in 1852 and was buried in St. Theodor, Basel. His wife died in 1862, the younger daughter in 1864 and the older in 1872.
