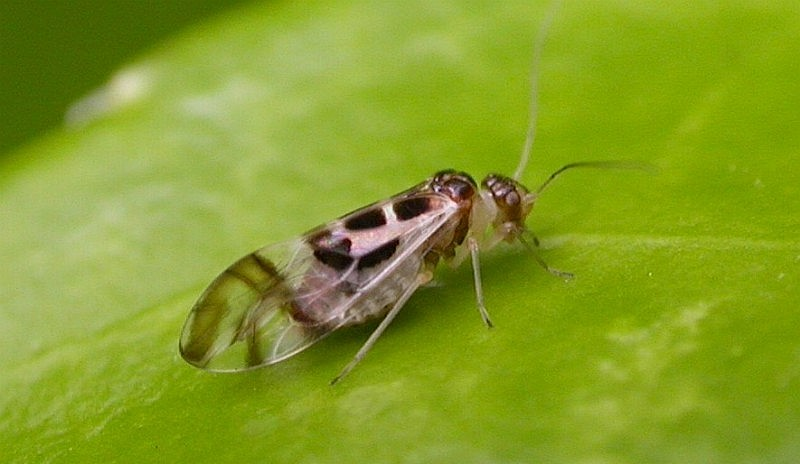
- Graphopsocus cruciatus

Scientific classification
- Domain: Eukaryota
- Kingdom: Animalia
- Phylum: Arthropoda
- Class: Insecta
- Order: Psocodea
- Suborder: Psocomorpha
- Infraorder: Caeciliusetae
- Family: Stenopsocidae

Genera
- Graphopsocus; Stenopsocus

= Stenopsocidae =

Family of booklice

Stenopsocidae is a family of Psocoptera belonging to the suborder Psocomorpha, in the infraorder Caeciliusetae. Member of this family have an areola postica connected to the M vein by a crossvein. The family is composed of about 100 species.
