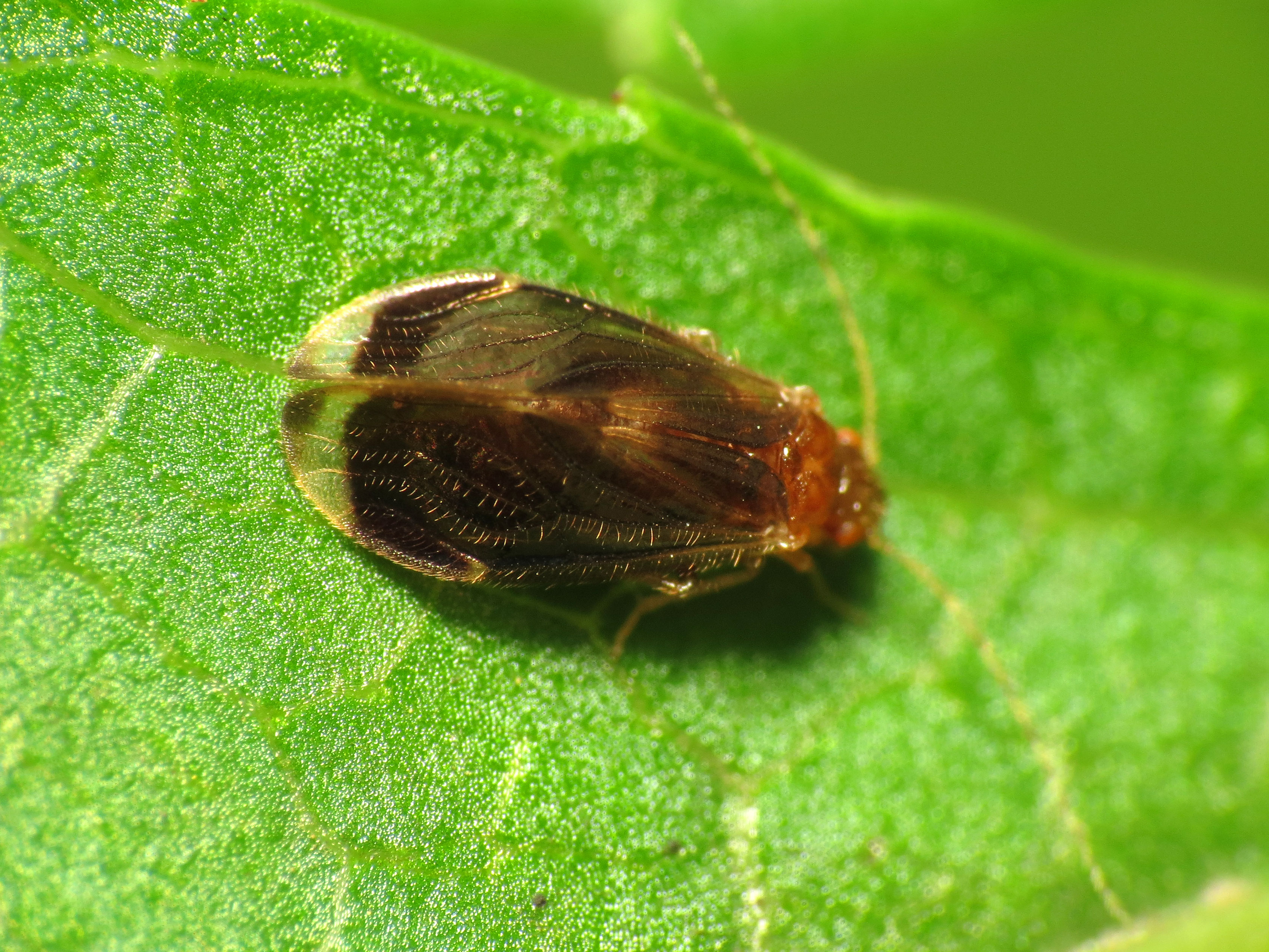
- Polypsocus corruptus

Scientific classification
- Domain: Eukaryota
- Kingdom: Animalia
- Phylum: Arthropoda
- Class: Insecta
- Order: Psocodea
- Infraorder: Caeciliusetae
- Family: Amphipsocidae
- Genus: Polypsocus; Hagen, 1866

= Polypsocus =

Genus of booklice

Polypsocus is a genus of hairy-winged barklice in the family Amphipsocidae. There are more than 20 described species in Polypsocus.

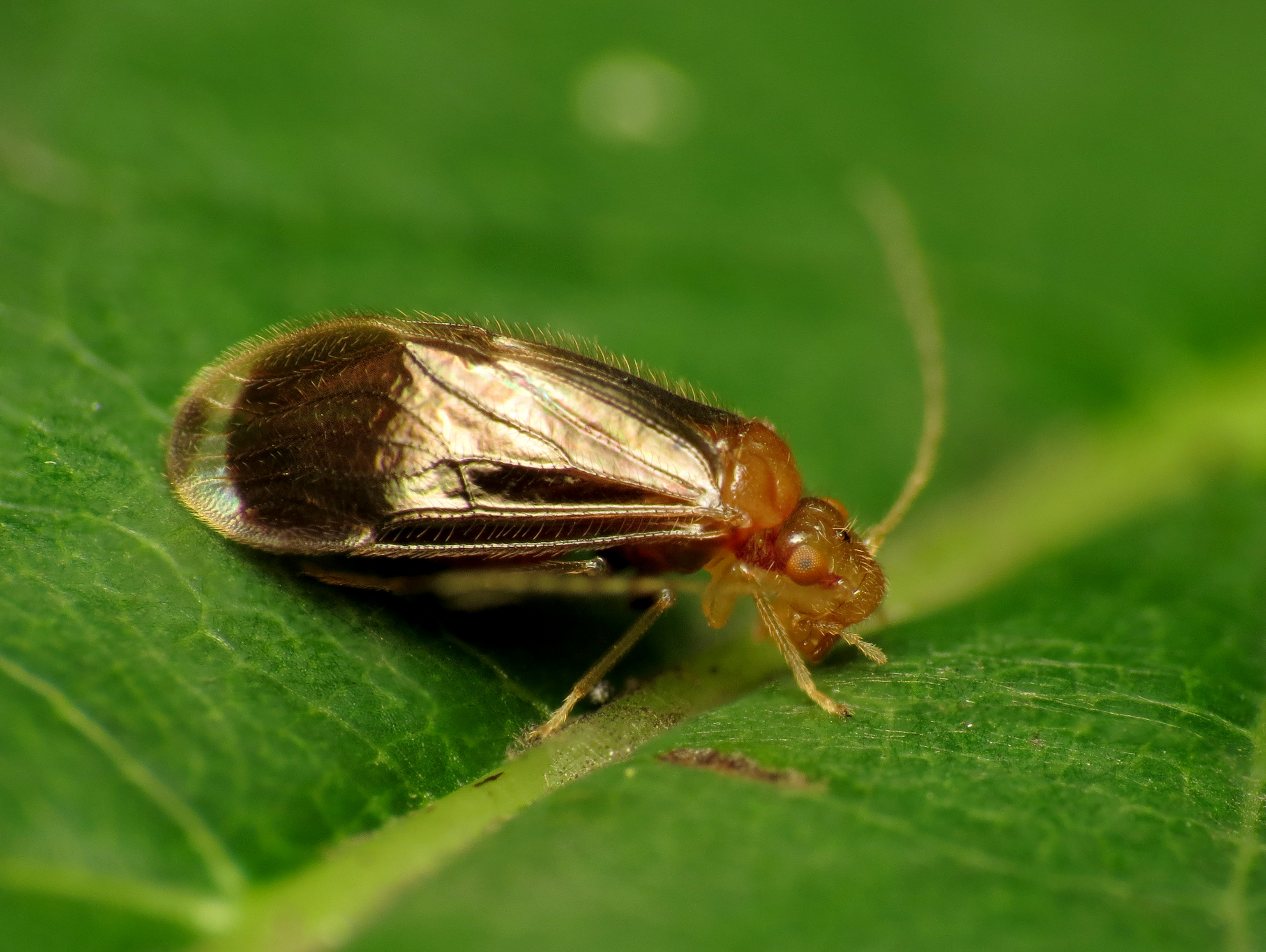
Polypsocus corruptus

== Species ==
These 22 species belong to the genus Polypsocus:

- Polypsocus bimaculatus Enderlein, 1925
- Polypsocus coleopterus Roesler, 1940
- Polypsocus collinsi Turner, 1984
- Polypsocus corruptus (Hagen, 1861)
- Polypsocus delunatus Roesler, 1940
- Polypsocus desectus (Enderlein, 1900)
- Polypsocus falcifer Roesler, 1940
- Polypsocus fasciatus Banks, 1908
- Polypsocus fastosus Roesler, 1940
- Polypsocus fuscopterus Mockford, 1991
- Polypsocus fuscus (Enderlein, 1900)
- Polypsocus griseolineatus (Enderlein, 1900)
- Polypsocus jujuyensis Garcia Aldrete, 2009
- Polypsocus lineatus Mockford, 1991
- Polypsocus lunulatus Enderlein, 1900
- Polypsocus nervulosus Enderlein, 1909
- Polypsocus ohausianus (Enderlein, 1909)
- Polypsocus quadriguttatus (Enderlein, 1900)
- Polypsocus selenius Roesler, 1940
- Polypsocus serpentinus Mockford, 1991
- Polypsocus suffuscus Roesler, 1940
- Polypsocus unicolor Roesler, 1940
