= Asiopsocus sonorensis =

Scientific classification
- Domain: Eukaryota
- Kingdom: Animalia
- Phylum: Arthropoda
- Class: Insecta
- Order: Psocodea
- Family: Asiopsocidae
- Genus: Asiopsocus
- Species: A. sonorensis

Binomial name
- Asiopsocus sonorensis Mockford & Garcia Aldrete, 1976

Species of booklouse

Asiopsocus sonorensis is a species of insect in the family Asiopsocidae. It is found in Central America and North America.
