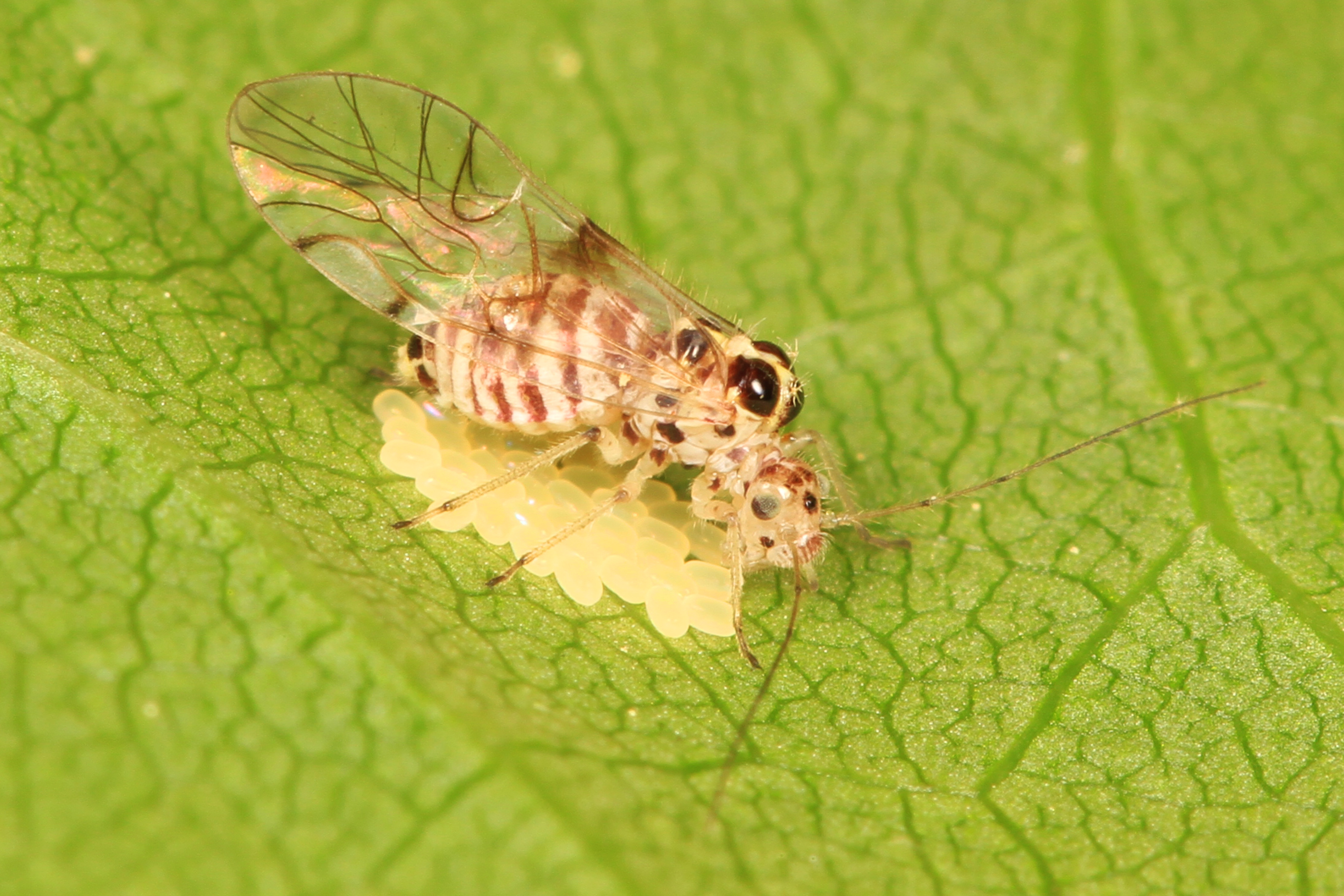

Scientific classification
- Domain: Eukaryota
- Kingdom: Animalia
- Phylum: Arthropoda
- Class: Insecta
- Order: Psocodea
- Family: Dasydemellidae
- Genus: Teliapsocus
- Species: T. conterminus

Binomial name
- Teliapsocus conterminus (Walsh, 1863)

= Teliapsocus conterminus =

Species of booklouse

Teliapsocus conterminus is a species of shaggy psocid in the family Dasydemellidae. It is found in North America.

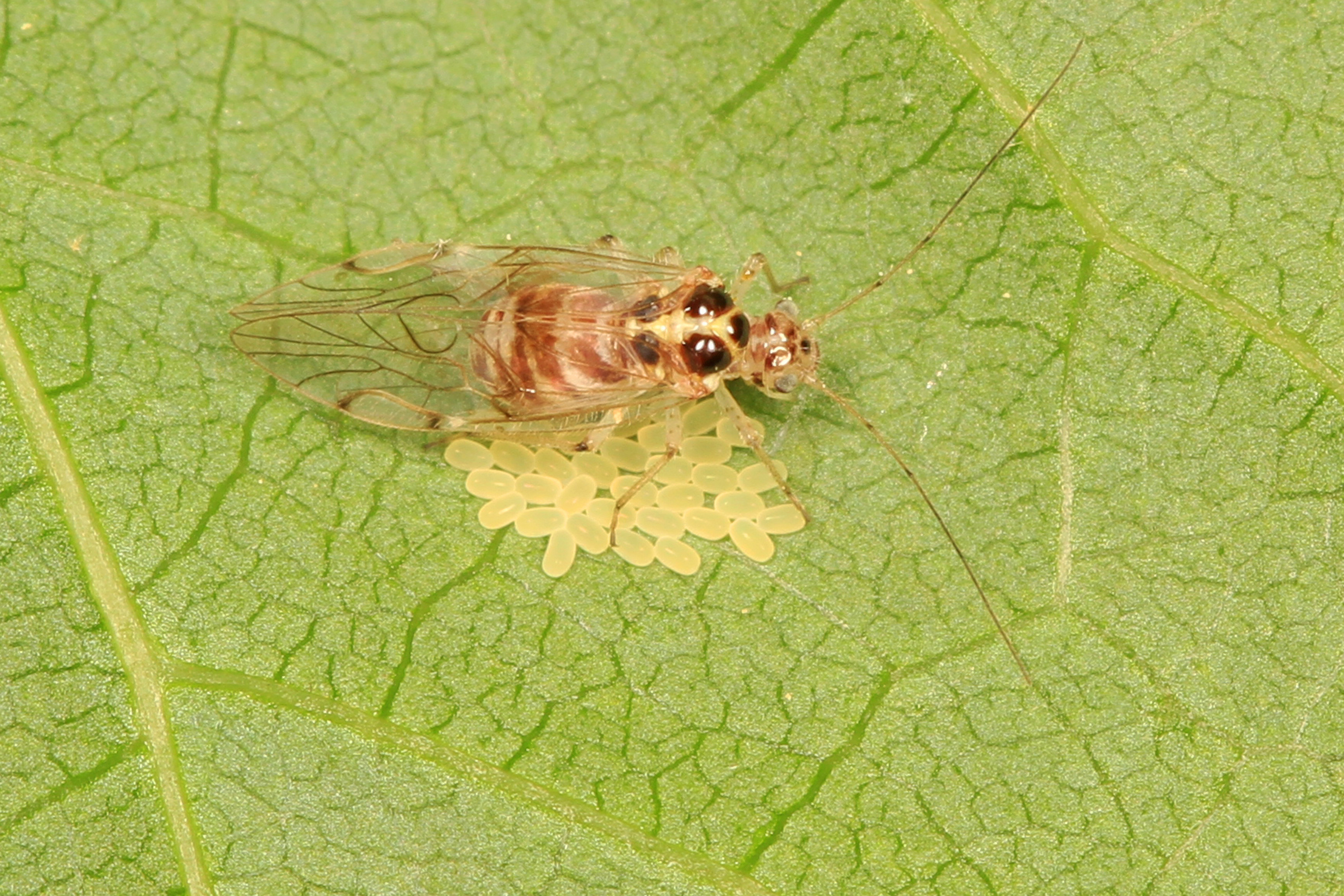
