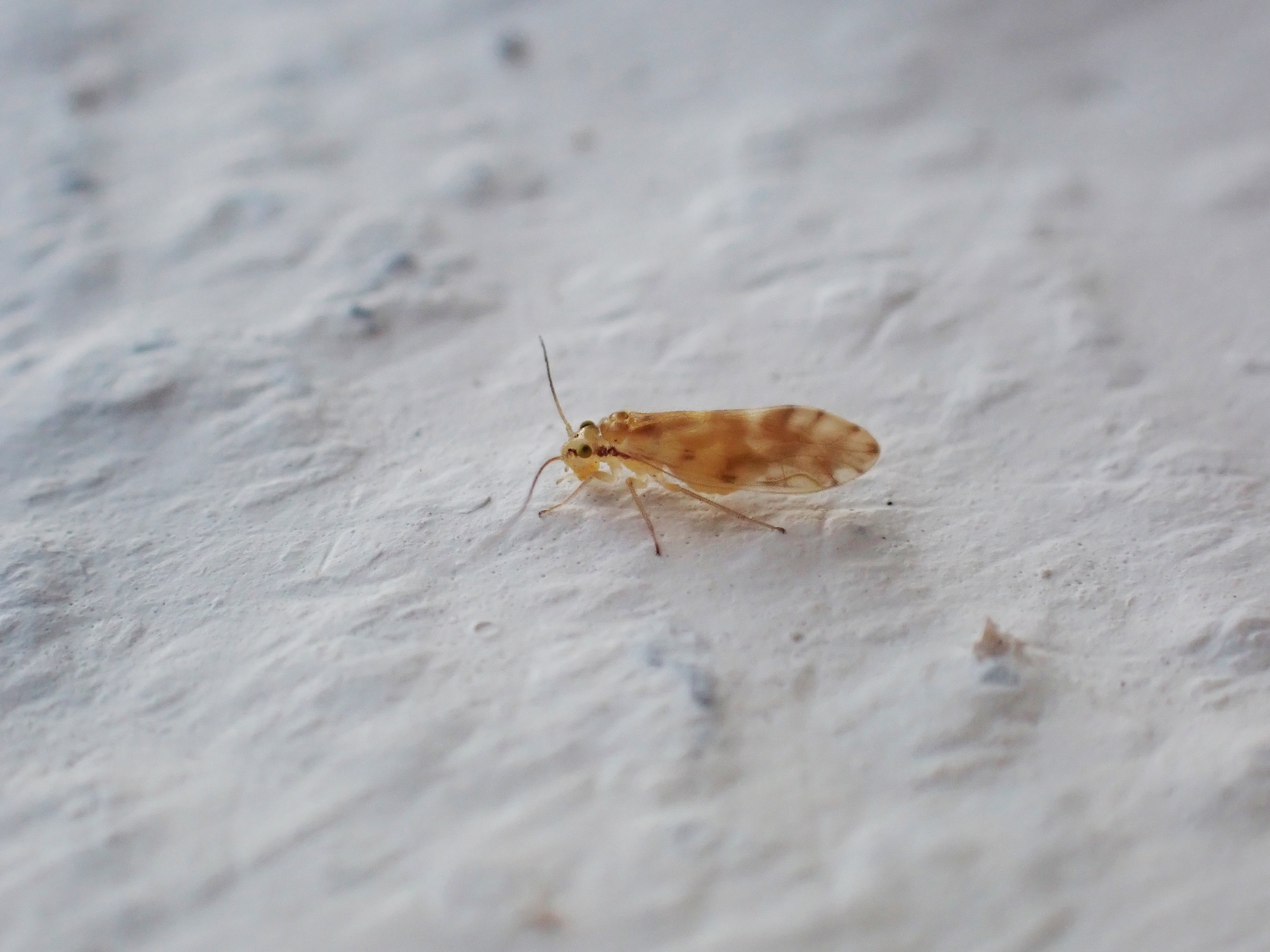

Scientific classification
- Domain: Eukaryota
- Kingdom: Animalia
- Phylum: Arthropoda
- Class: Insecta
- Order: Psocodea
- Family: Paracaeciliidae
- Genus: Chilenocaecilius
- Species: C. ornatipennis

Binomial name
- Chilenocaecilius ornatipennis (Blanchard, 1851)

Synonyms
- List: Psocus ornatipennis Blanchard, 1851 [1]; Caecilius crotarus Thornton & Lyall, 1978 [3]; Caecilius ornatipennis (Blanchard, 1851)

= Chilenocaecilius ornatipennis =

Species of insect

Chilenocaecilius ornatipennis is a species of barklouse within the family Paracaeciliidae. It is one of two known species within the genus Chilenocaecilius.

== Description ==
Chilenocaecilius ornatipennis medium-sized barkfly, which ranges in size from 3.5–4 mm (0.14–0.16 in) in length. The general body colour of the species ranges from yellowish-white to medium brown. The head exhibits a reddish-brown band of hypodermal pigment extending from the inner side of the antennal socket to the compound eye. Additionally, there is a relatively small dark brown ocellar tubercle present. The thoracic pleura display a broad longitudinal band of red-brown hypodermal pigment. The species is always macropterous, possessing long fully developed wings. The species exhibits a distinctive wing pattern, which possesses dark smudges where veins meet the edge of wing. The vein Cu2 lacks setae. The posterior cubitus vein CuP (= Cu2) in the forewing is bare.

== Distribution and habitat ==
Chilenocaecilius ornatipennis is native to South America, where it is widespread in Chile and possesses two known localities in Argentina. The species has also been introduced outside of its native range into countries such as the United Kingdom, Ireland and France. This species has been found to live on the foliage of a wide variety of vegetation, and populations have been recorded at altitudes up to 1,000 m (3,300 ft) above sea level.

== Reproduction ==
Chilenocaecilius ornatipennis is capable of sexual reproduction, however most populations have been found to lack males and are parthenogenetic.
