= Chilenocaecilius nestae =

Scientific classification
- Kingdom: Animalia
- Phylum: Arthropoda
- Class: Insecta
- Order: Psocodea
- Family: Paracaeciliidae
- Genus: Chilenocaecilius
- Species: C. nestae

Binomial name
- Chilenocaecilius nestae New & Thornton, 1981

Synonyms
- Caecilius nestae New & Thornton, 1981

Species of insect

Chilenocaecilius nestae is a species of barklouse within the family Paracaeciliidae. It is one of two known species within the genus Chilenocaecilius.

== Description ==
Chilenocaecilius nestae is predominantly yellowish-beige in colour with black eyes. Ocelli are located on small dark brown tubercles. The vertex of the head is dark brown to almost black in the midline. The post-clypeus and frons are dark brown, while the gena and ventral regions of the head are pale yellow or ivory. The antennae and palpi are pale. The dorsum of the thorax is very dark brown, almost black in some specimens, with the dorsal portion of the pleura being dark and the ventral thorax and legs pale.

The forewings are strongly marked with dark brown, with a pale pterostigma and mainly pale cells R and R1, while the posterior cells have hyaline marginal lunules. The hindwings have greyish brown shading behind R, extended along the wing. The abdomen is yellowish-beige with irregular dark brown dorsal pigmentation, which is most pronounced in brachypterous specimens. The forewing features an abnormal M and radial fork in macropterous specimens and a broadened apical pterostigma. The sub-genital plate in females is incipiently bilobed, with bluntly tapered gonapophyses and no seta on the remnant of the external valve. The epiproct is rounded, and the paraproct has about 12 trichobothria. In males, the hypandrium is transverse, with a broad anteriorly phallosome frame that tapers to a rounded posterior apex, and relatively narrow outer parameres. The epiproct is small and triangular, while the paraproct has an outer spiculate area. The basal hind tarsal segment has 22 ctenidia.

== Distribution and habitat ==
Chilenocaecilius nestae is native to Chile, where it can be found inhabiting vegetation.
