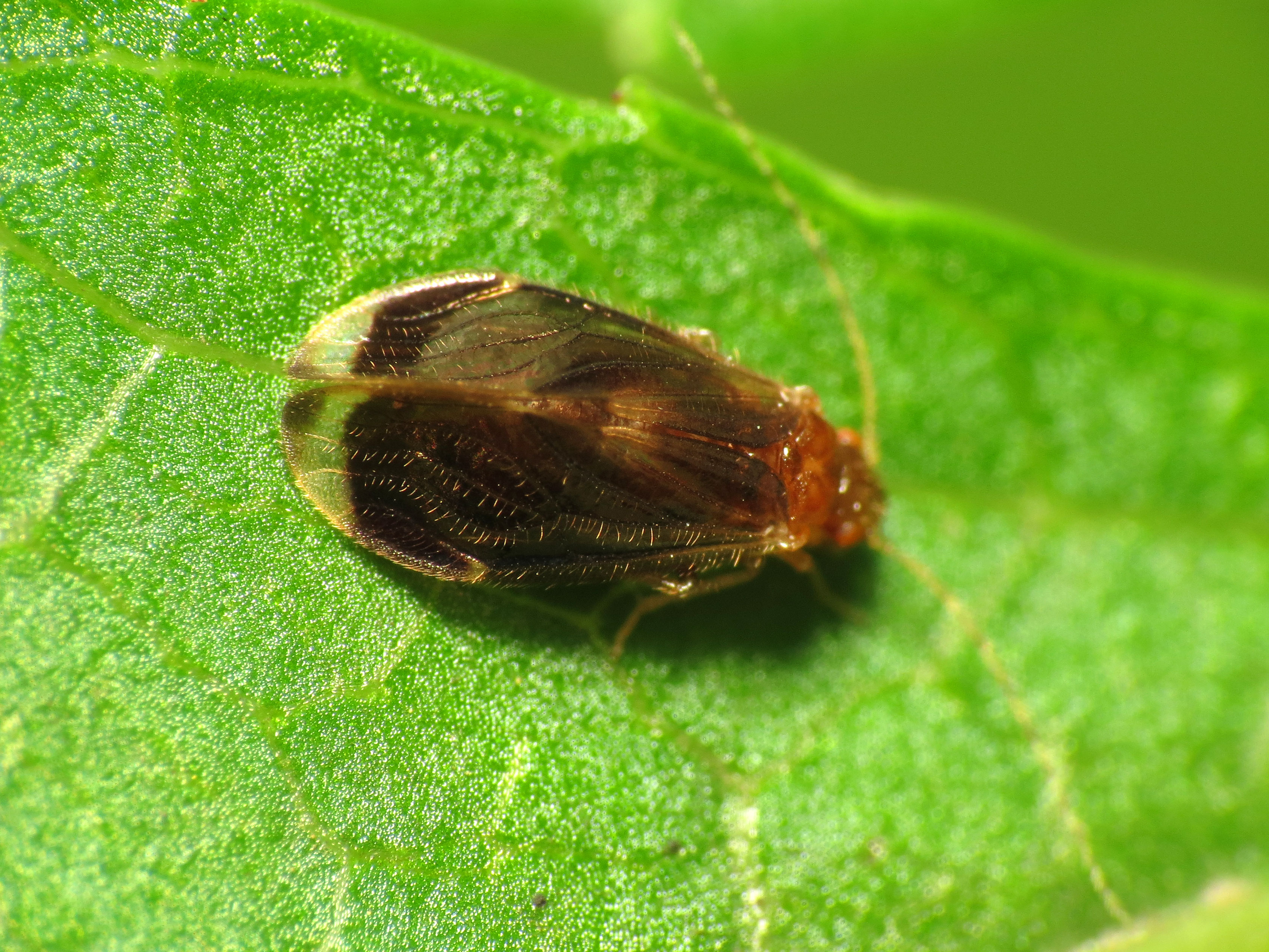
- Hairy-winged Barklouse, Polypsocus corruptus

Scientific classification
- Domain: Eukaryota
- Kingdom: Animalia
- Phylum: Arthropoda
- Class: Insecta
- Order: Psocodea
- Suborder: Psocomorpha
- Infraorder: Caeciliusetae

= Caeciliusetae =

Group of booklice

Caeciliusetae is an infraorder of Psocodea (formerly Psocoptera) in the suborder Psocomorpha. There are about 6 families and more than 1,300 described species in Caeciliusetae.

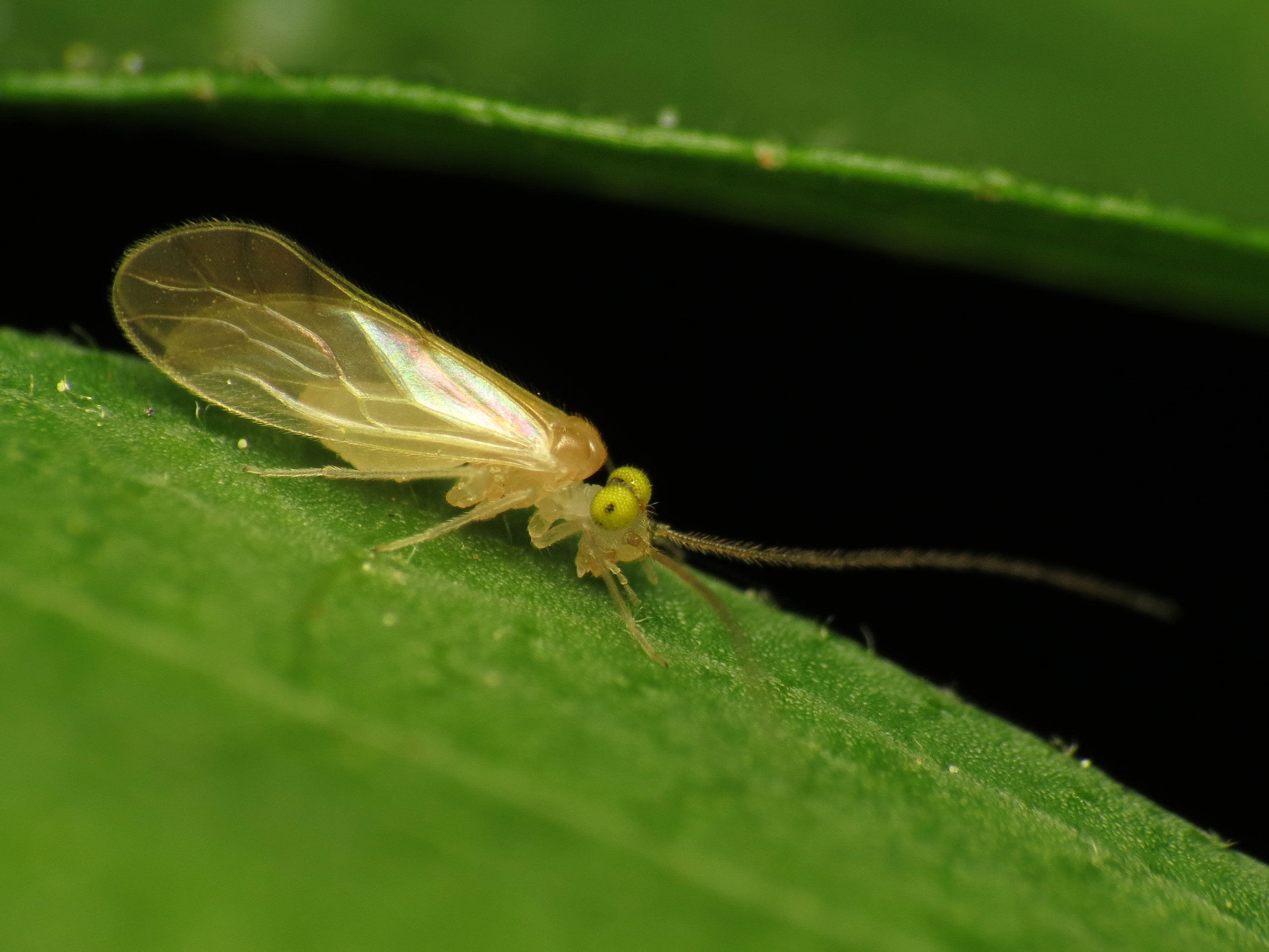
Xanthocaecilius sommermanae

== Families ==
These six families belong to the infraorder Caeciliusetae:

- Amphipsocidae Pearman, 1936 (hairy-winged barklice)
- Asiopsocidae Mockford & Garcia Aldrete, 1976
- Caeciliusidae Mockford, 2000 (lizard barklice)
- Dasydemellidae Mockford, 1978 (shaggy psocids)
- Paracaeciliidae Mockford, 1989
- Stenopsocidae Pearman, 1936 (narrow barklice)
