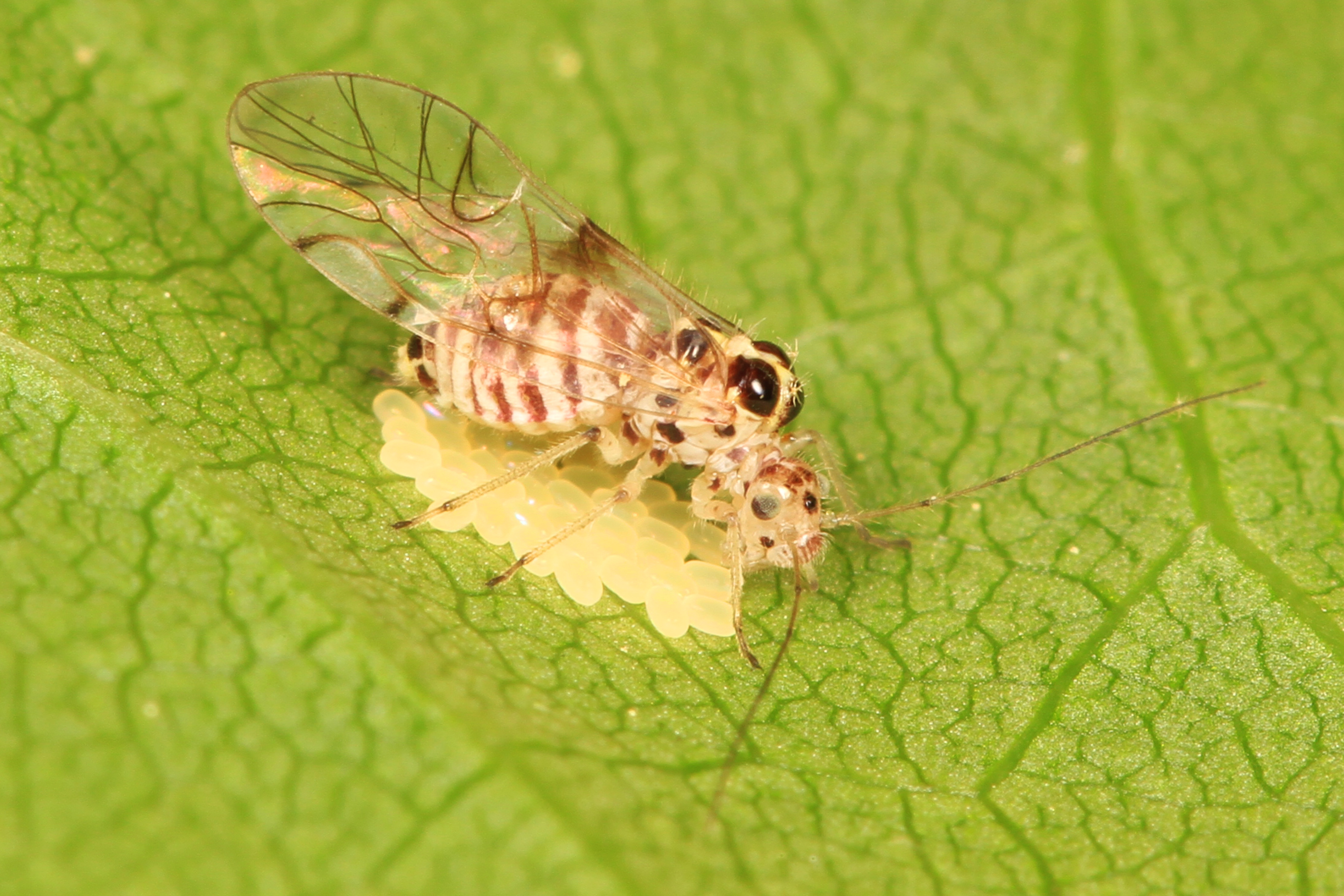
- Teliapsocus conterminus

Scientific classification
- Domain: Eukaryota
- Kingdom: Animalia
- Phylum: Arthropoda
- Class: Insecta
- Order: Psocodea
- Family: Dasydemellidae
- Genus: Teliapsocus; Chapman, 1930

= Teliapsocus =

Genus of booklice

Teliapsocus is a genus of shaggy psocids in the family Dasydemellidae. There are at least two described species in Teliapsocus.

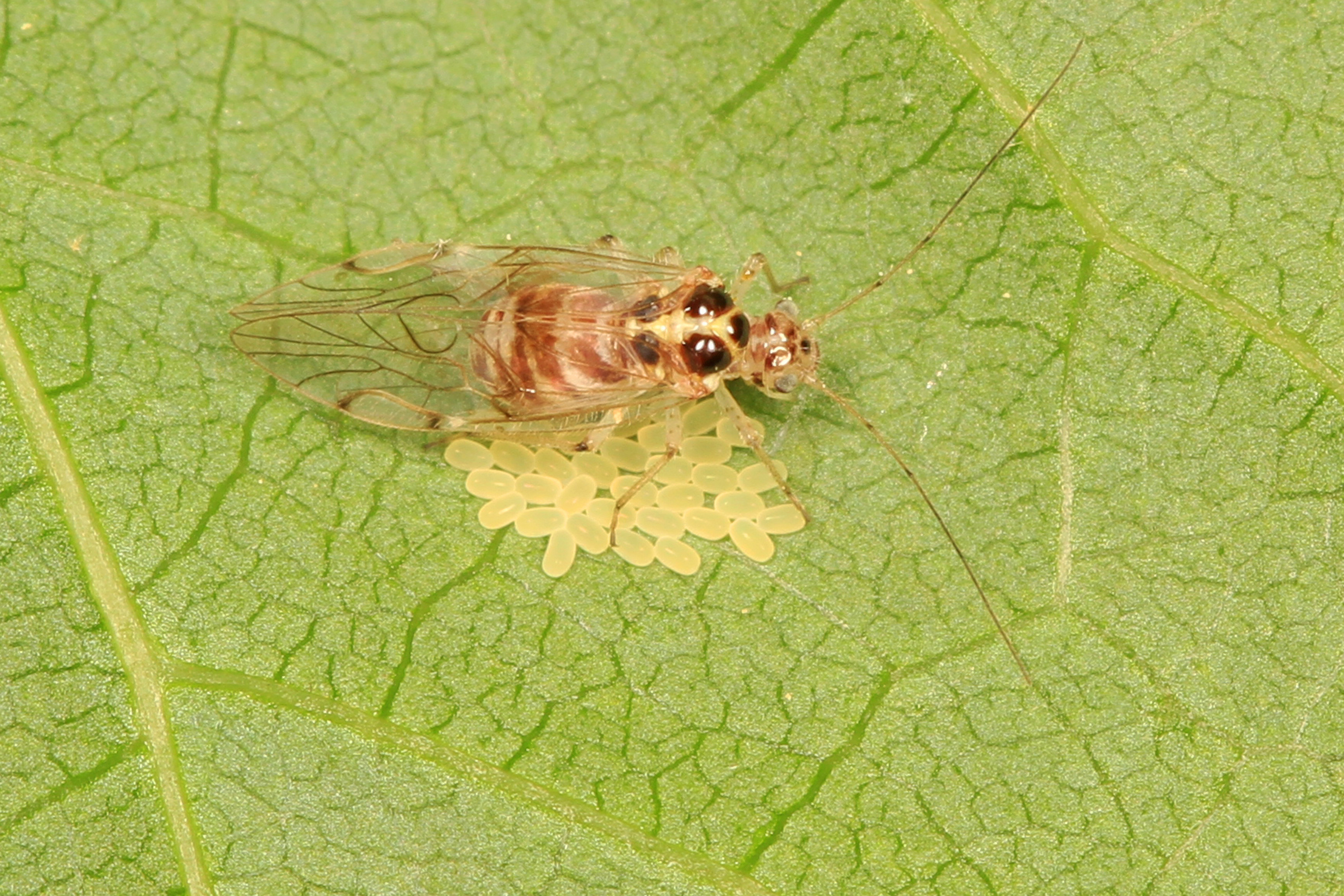
Teliapsocus conterminus

== Species ==
These two species belong to the genus Teliapsocus:

- Teliapsocus conterminus (Walsh, 1863)
- Teliapsocus distinctus Badonnel, 1986
