= Asiopsocus =

Scientific classification
- Domain: Eukaryota
- Kingdom: Animalia
- Phylum: Arthropoda
- Class: Insecta
- Order: Psocodea
- Family: Asiopsocidae
- Genus: Asiopsocus; Günther, 1968

Genus of booklice

Asiopsocus is a genus of barklice, booklice, and parasitic lice in the family Asiopsocidae. There are about seven described species in Asiopsocus.

== Species ==
These seven species belong to the genus Asiopsocus:

- Asiopsocus meridionalis Lienhard, 1981
- Asiopsocus mongolicus Günther, 1968
- Asiopsocus sonorensis Mockford & Garcia Aldrete, 1976
- Asiopsocus spinosus Mockford, 2005
- Asiopsocus tehuacanus Garcia Aldrete & Casasola, 1995
- Asiopsocus vanharteni Lienhard, 1995
- Asiopsocus wulingshanensis Li, 2002
