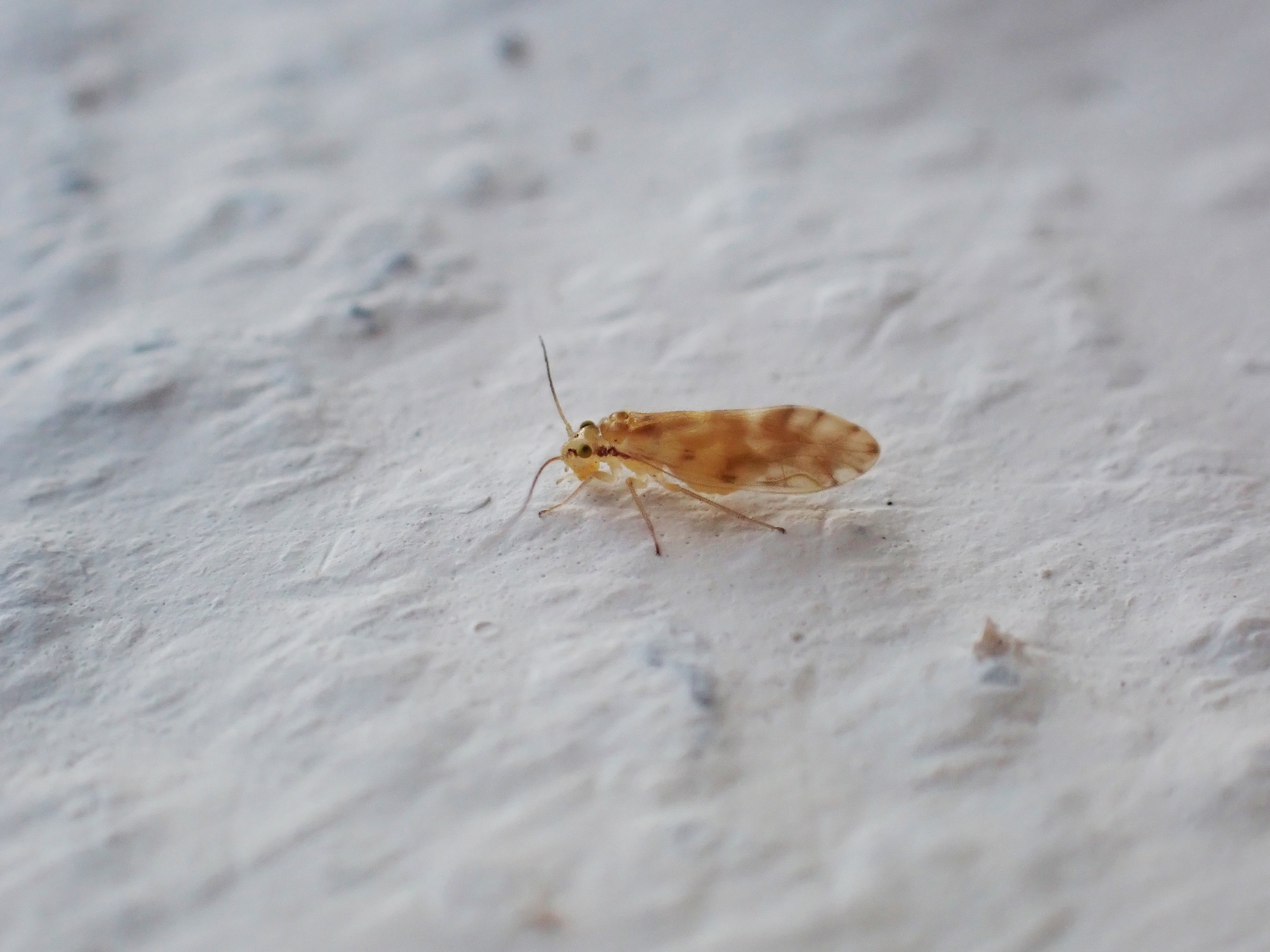
- Chilenocaecilius ornatipennis

Scientific classification
- Domain: Eukaryota
- Kingdom: Animalia
- Phylum: Arthropoda
- Class: Insecta
- Order: Psocodea
- Family: Paracaeciliidae
- Genus: Chilenocaecilius; Mockford, 2000

= Chilenocaecilius =

Genus of insects

Chilenocaecilius is a genus of insect within the family Paracaeciliidae. There are currently two known species within the genus, both of which are native to South America. The genus was first described by the entomologist Edward L. Mockford in the year 2000.

== Species ==
- Chilenocaecilius ornatipennis (Blanchard, 1851)
- Chilenocaecilius nestae (New & Thornton, 1981)
