= Xanthocaecilius quillayute =

Scientific classification
- Domain: Eukaryota
- Kingdom: Animalia
- Phylum: Arthropoda
- Class: Insecta
- Order: Psocodea
- Family: Caeciliusidae
- Genus: Xanthocaecilius
- Species: X. quillayute

Binomial name
- Xanthocaecilius quillayute (Chapman, 1930)

Species of booklouse

Xanthocaecilius quillayute is a species of lizard barklouse in the family Caeciliusidae. It is found in North America.
