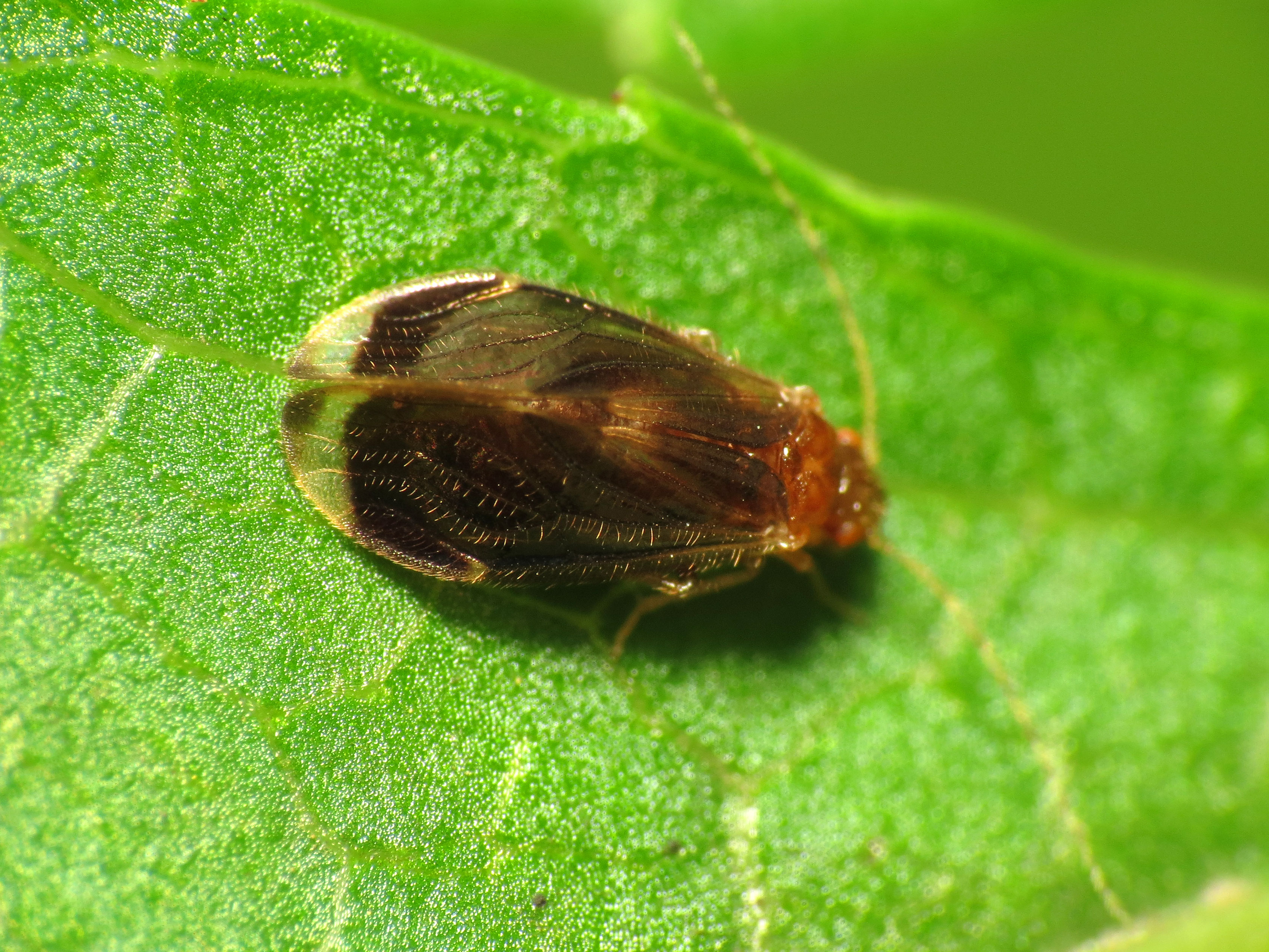
- Polypsocus corruptus

Scientific classification
- Kingdom: Animalia
- Phylum: Arthropoda
- Clade: Pancrustacea
- Class: Insecta
- Order: Psocodea
- Suborder: Psocomorpha
- Infraorder: Caeciliusetae
- Family: Amphipsocidae

Subfamilies
- Subfamily Amphipsocinae; tribe Kolbiini; tribe Schizopechini; tribe Capillopsocini; tribe Dasypsocini; tribe Polypsocini; tribe Amphipsocini; Subfamily Calocaeciliinae

= Amphipsocidae =

Family of booklice

Amphipsocidae is a family of hairy-winged barklice in the order Psocodea (formerly Psocoptera). Most species are 3.0-4.5 mm long and have many setae (hairs) on the veins and margin of the forewing. The main veins of the forewing are usually lined with two rows of setae. Like the other members of the infra-order Caeciliusetae, they have a broad, flat labrum, with well defined edges.

There are at least 19 genera and 240 described species in Amphipsocidae. These inconspicuous insects are widely distributed. The large genus Amphipsocus (98 named species) is found in the Afrotropics and eastern Asia. The genera Afropsocus, Capillopsocus, Ctenopsocus, Harpezoneura, Pentathyrsus, Schizopechus, and Xenopsocus are endemic to the Afrotropical region, whereas Complaniamphus, Pseudokolbea, Siniamphipsocus, and Tagalopsocus are endemic to eastern Asia. The genus Polypsocus is endemic to the Americas; Europe has two species, Kolbia quisquiliarum and Brachypsocus badonneli.

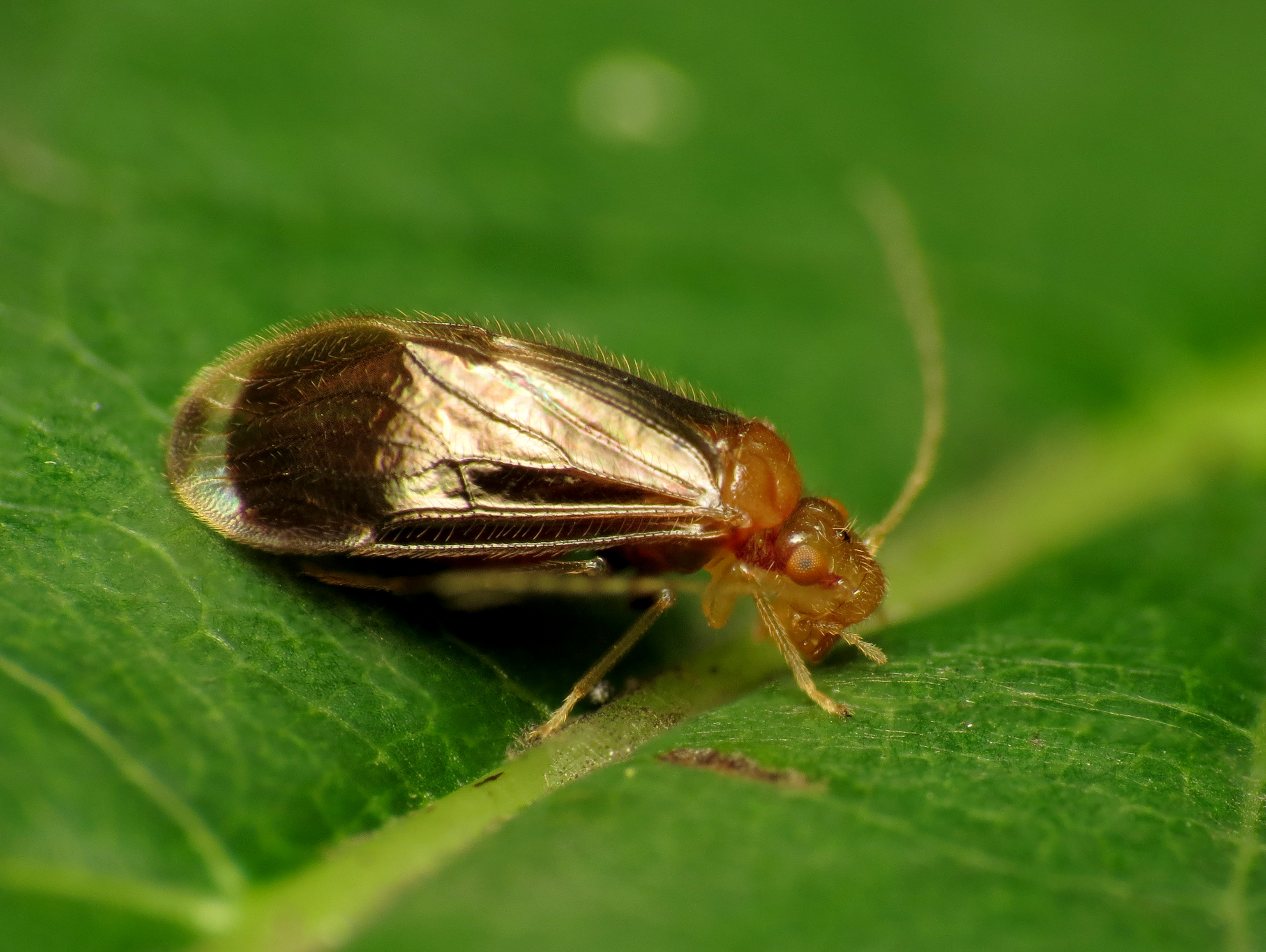
Polypsocus corruptus

== Genera ==
These 21 genera belong to the family Amphipsocidae:

- Afropsocus^{c g}
- Amphipsocopsis^{c g}
- Amphipsocus^{c g}
- Brachypsocus^{c g}
- Calocaecilius^{c g}
- Capillopsocus^{c g}
- Complaniamphus^{c g}
- Ctenopsocus^{c g}
- Dasypsocus^{c g}
- Harpezoneura^{c g}
- Kodamaius^{c g}
- Kolbia^{c g}
- Pentathyrsus^{c g}
- Polypsocus Hagen, 1866^{i c g b}
- Pseudokolbea^{c g}
- Ptenopsila^{c g}
- Schizopechus^{c g}
- Siniamphipsocus^{c g}
- Taeniostigma^{c g}
- Tagalopsocus^{c g}
- Xenopsocus^{c g}

Data sources: i = ITIS, c = Catalogue of Life, g = GBIF, b = Bugguide.net

== Sources ==
- Lienhard, C. & Smithers, C. N. 2002. Psocoptera (Insecta): World Catalogue and Bibliography. Instrumenta Biodiversitatis, vol. 5. Muséum d'histoire naturelle, Genève.
- Yoshizawa, Kazunori (2002). "Phylogeny and higher classification of suborder Psocomorpha (Insecta: Psocodea: 'Psocoptera')" (PDF). Zoological Journal of the Linnean Society. 136 (3): 371–400. doi:10.1046/j.1096-3642.2002.00036.x. ISSN 0024-4082.
- Yoshizawa, Kazunori (2005). "Morphology of Psocomorpha (Psocodea:'Psocoptera')". Insecta Matsumurana. Series Entomology. New Series. 62. Faculty Of Agriculture, Hokkaido University: 1–44.
