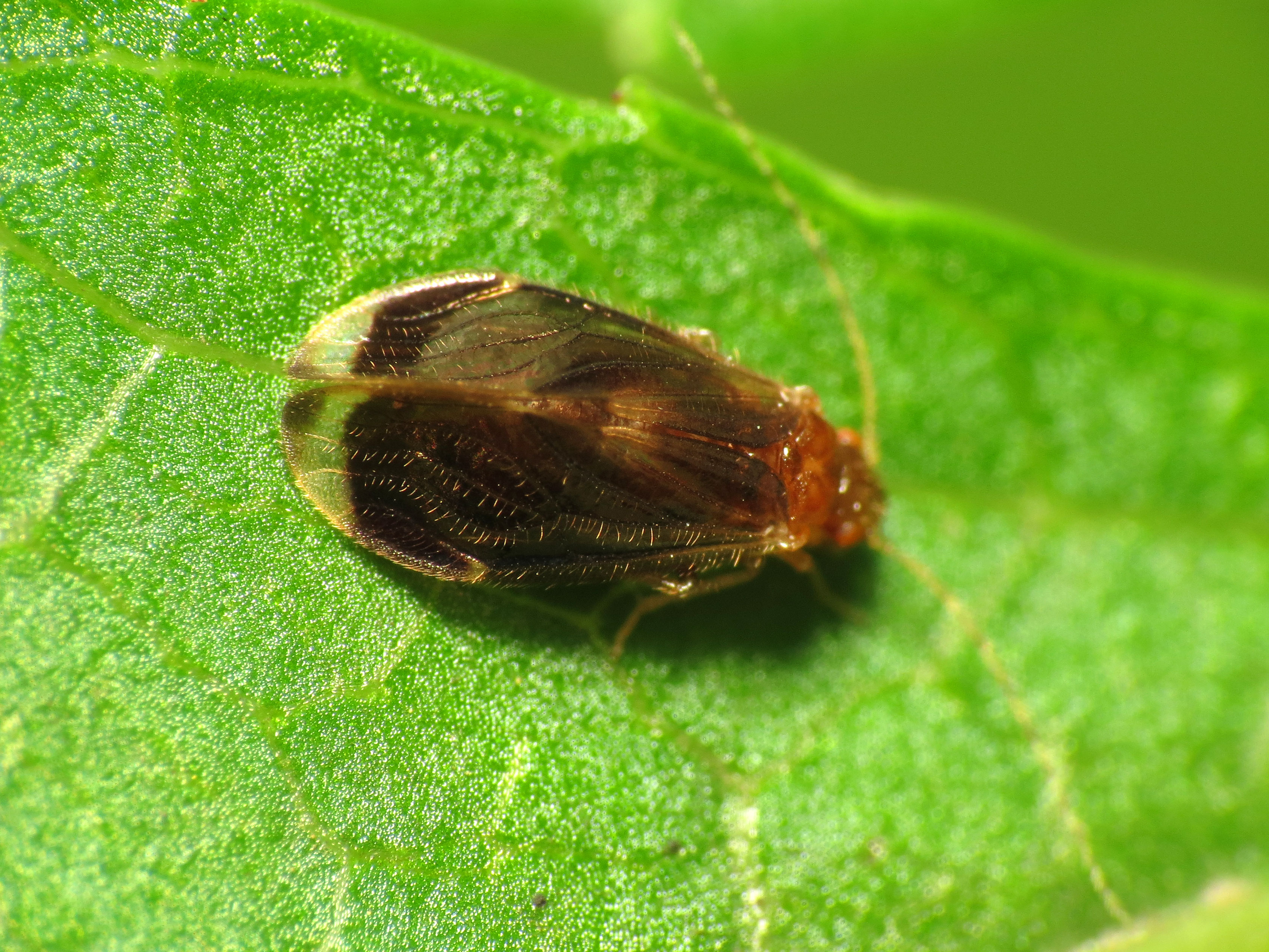

Scientific classification
- Domain: Eukaryota
- Kingdom: Animalia
- Phylum: Arthropoda
- Class: Insecta
- Order: Psocodea
- Family: Amphipsocidae
- Genus: Polypsocus
- Species: P. corruptus

Binomial name
- Polypsocus corruptus (Hagen, 1861)

= Polypsocus corruptus =

Species of booklouse

Polypsocus corruptus is a species of hairy-winged barklouse in the family Amphipsocidae. It is found in Central America and North America.

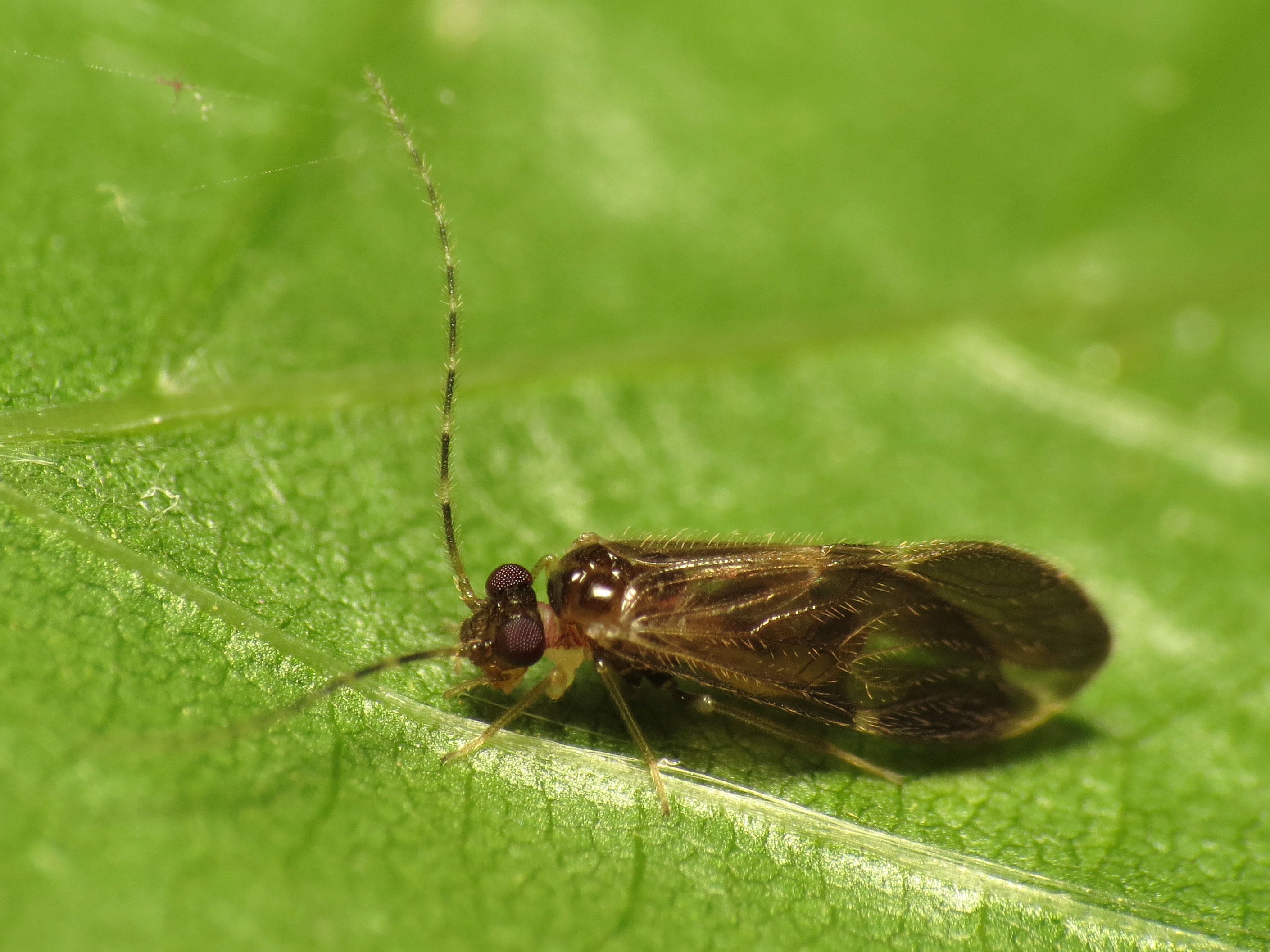

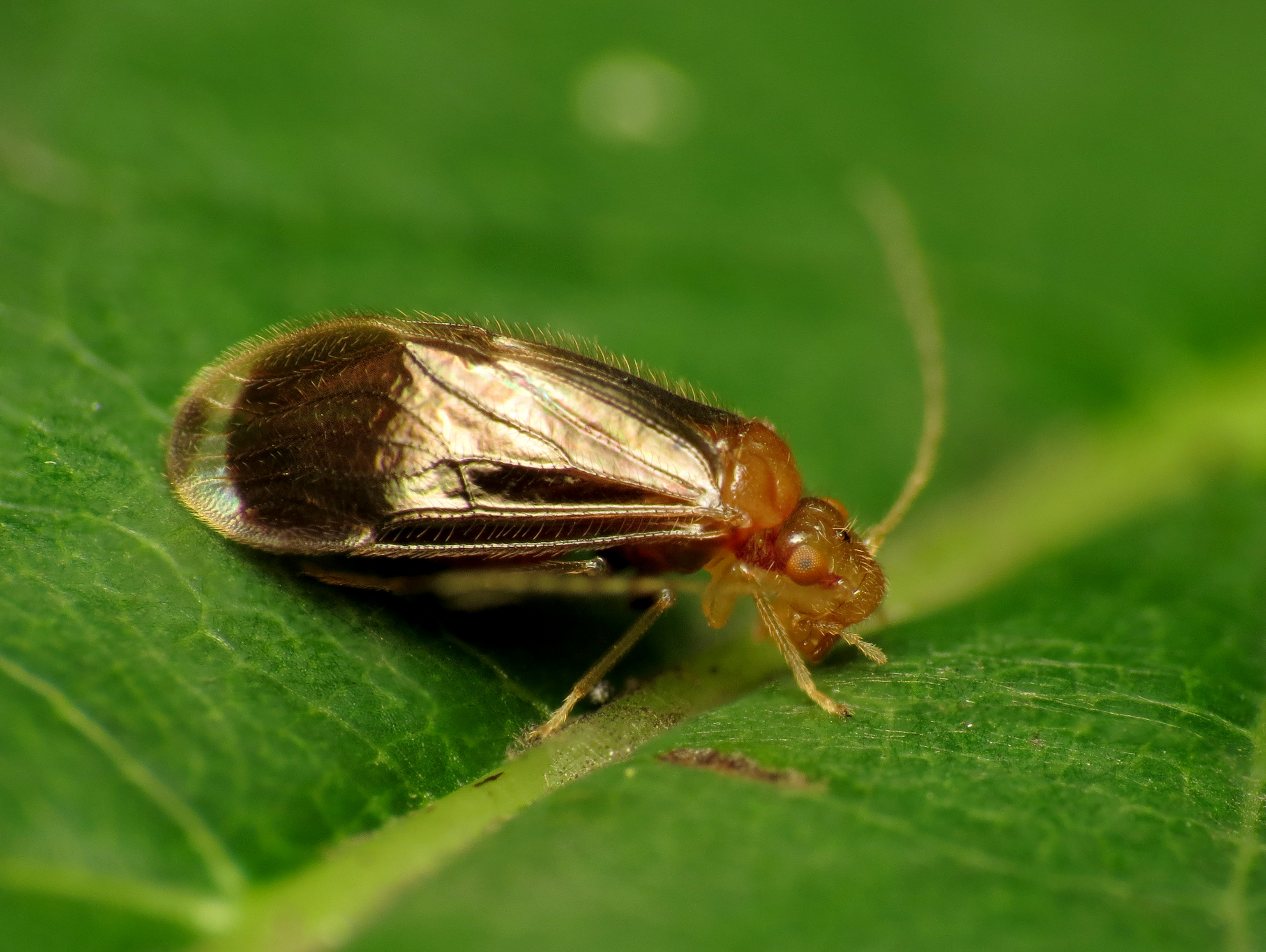
