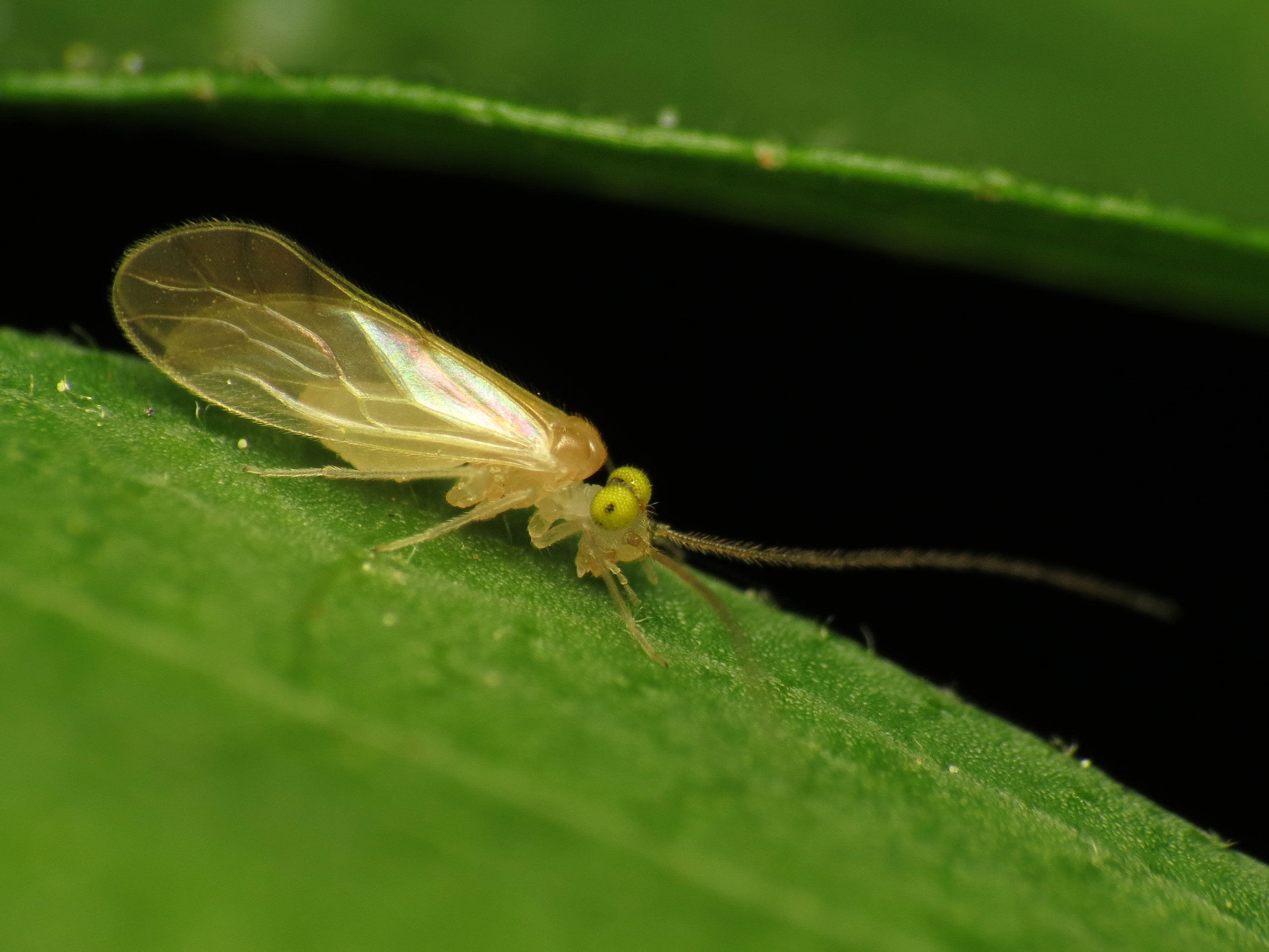
- Xanthocaecilius sommermanae

Scientific classification
- Domain: Eukaryota
- Kingdom: Animalia
- Phylum: Arthropoda
- Class: Insecta
- Order: Psocodea
- Family: Caeciliusidae
- Genus: Xanthocaecilius; Mockford, 1989

= Xanthocaecilius =

Genus of booklice

Xanthocaecilius is a genus of lizard barklice in the family Caeciliusidae. There are at least 2 described species in Xanthocaecilius.

== Species ==
- Xanthocaecilius quillayute (Chapman, 1930)
- Xanthocaecilius sommermanae (Mockford, 1955)
