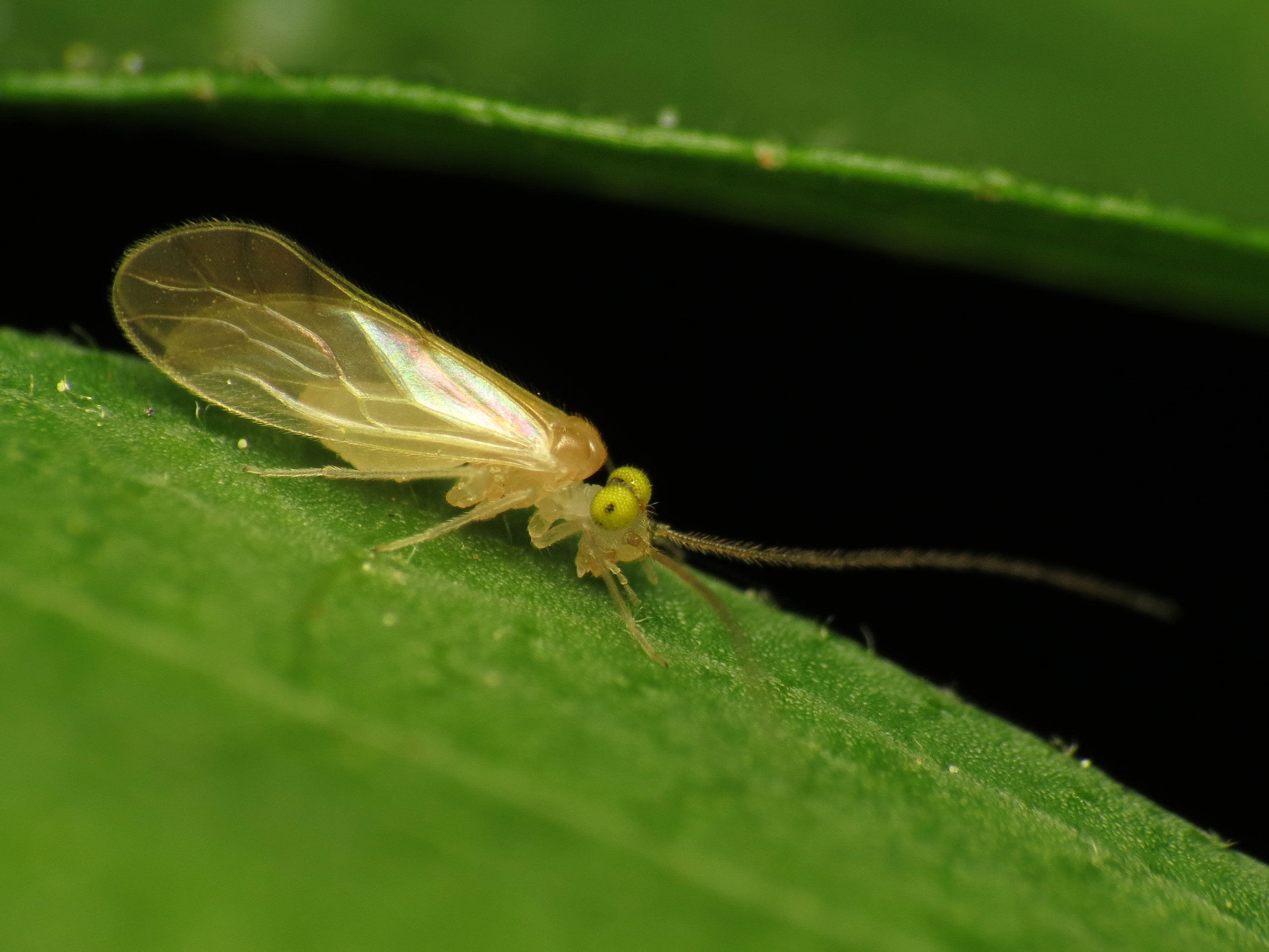
- Xanthocaecilius sommermanae

Scientific classification
- Kingdom: Animalia
- Phylum: Arthropoda
- Clade: Pancrustacea
- Class: Insecta
- Order: Psocodea
- Suborder: Psocomorpha
- Infraorder: Caeciliusetae
- Family: Paracaeciliidae; Mockford, 1989

= Paracaeciliidae =

Family of barklice

Paracaeciliidae is a family of bark lice in the order Psocodea (formerly Psocoptera). There are about 5 genera and more than 100 described species in Paracaeciliidae.

== Genera ==
These five genera belong to the family Paracaeciliidae:

- Chilenocaecilius Mockford, 2000
- Enderleinella Badonnel, 1932
- Mockfordiella Badonnel, 1977
- Paracaecilius Badonnel, 1931
- Xanthocaecilius Mockford, 1989
