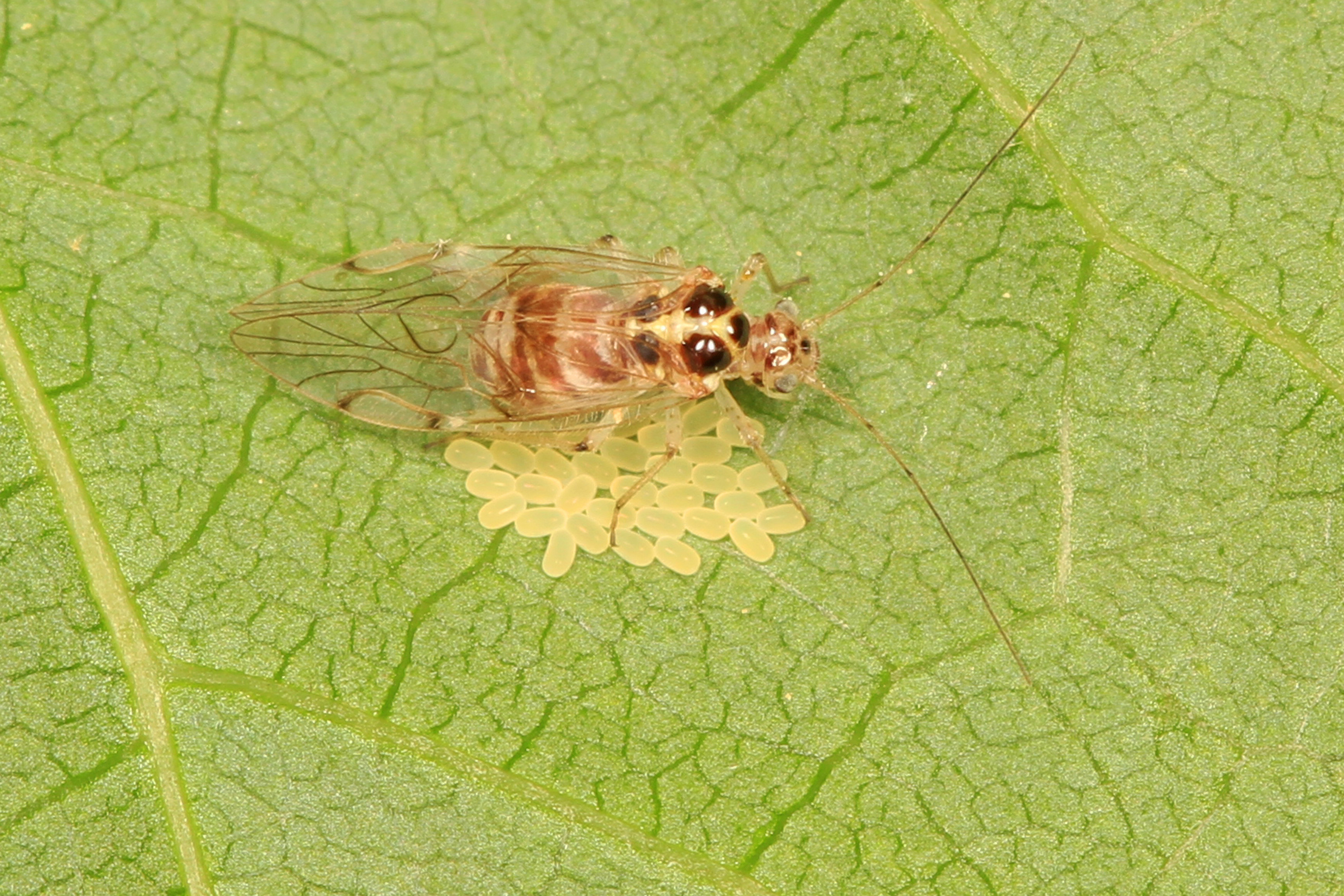
- Teliapsocus conterminum

Scientific classification
- Kingdom: Animalia
- Phylum: Arthropoda
- Clade: Pancrustacea
- Class: Insecta
- Order: Psocodea
- Suborder: Psocomorpha
- Infraorder: Caeciliusetae
- Family: Dasydemellidae; Mockford, 1978

Genera
- Dasydemella; Matsumuraiella; Ptenopsila; Teliapsocus

= Dasydemellidae =

Family of booklice

Dasydemellidae is a family of Psocodea (formerly Psocoptera) belonging to the suborder Psocomorpha, in the infraorder Caeciliusetae. The family is composed of about 30 species.
