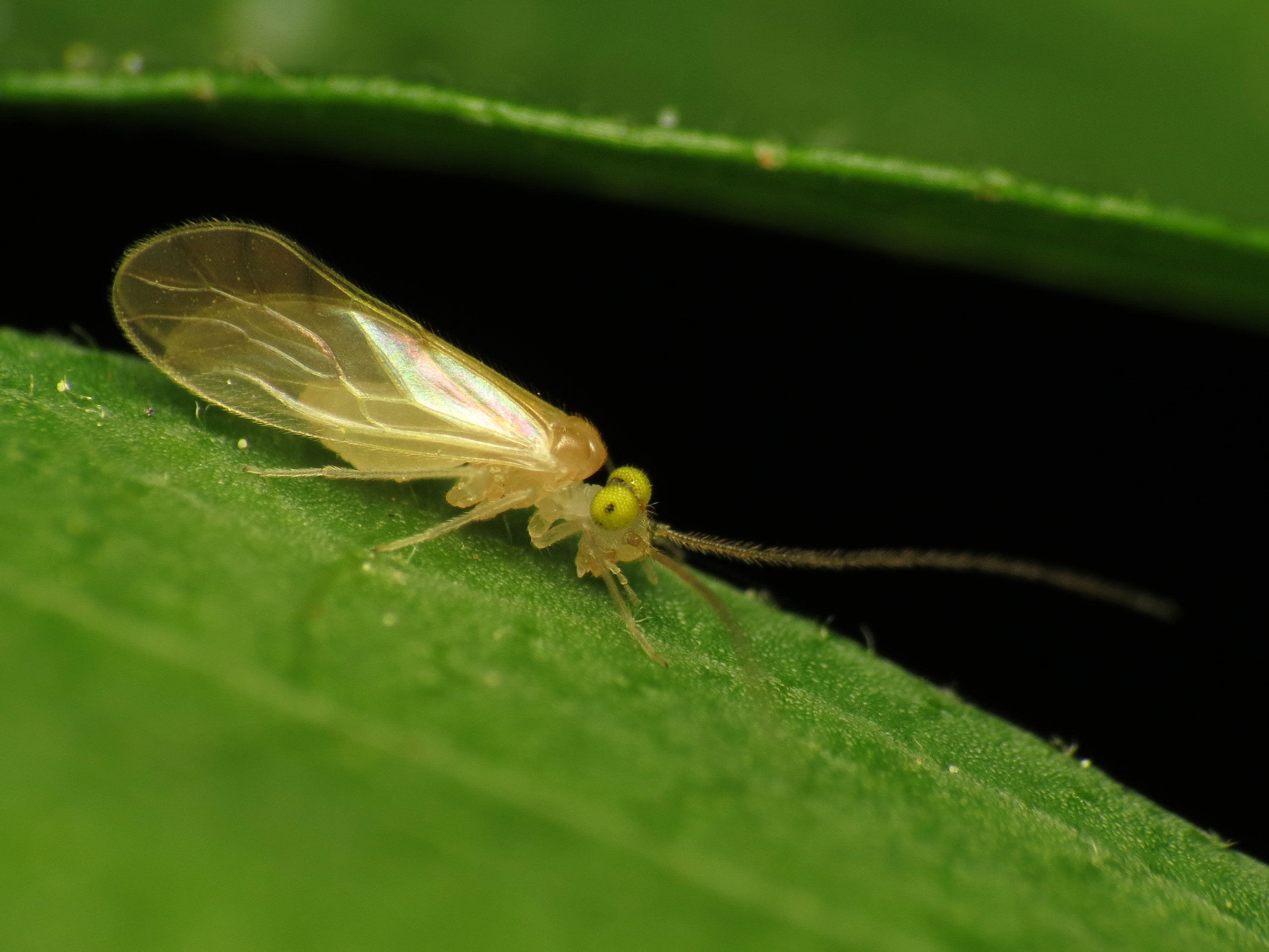

Scientific classification
- Domain: Eukaryota
- Kingdom: Animalia
- Phylum: Arthropoda
- Class: Insecta
- Order: Psocodea
- Family: Caeciliusidae
- Genus: Xanthocaecilius
- Species: X. sommermanae

Binomial name
- Xanthocaecilius sommermanae (Mockford, 1955)

= Xanthocaecilius sommermanae =

Species of booklouse

Xanthocaecilius sommermanae is a species of insect in the family Paracaeciliidae. It is found in North America.
