= Asiopsocidae =

Scientific classification
- Kingdom: Animalia
- Phylum: Arthropoda
- Clade: Pancrustacea
- Class: Insecta
- Order: Psocodea
- Suborder: Psocomorpha
- Infraorder: Caeciliusetae
- Family: Asiopsocidae

Genera
- Asiopsocus; Notiopsocus; Pronotiopsocus

Family of booklice

Asiopsocidae is a family of Psocodea (formerly Psocoptera) belonging to the infraorder Caeciliusetae. The family is composed of 14 known species of barklice in three genera: Asiopsocus, Notiopsocus, and Pronotiopsocus. One species from each genus has been found in the United States.
