= List of Lachesilla species =

This is a list of 315 species in the genus Lachesilla.

== Lachesilla species ==
- Lachesilla abiesicola Garcia Aldrete, 1990
- Lachesilla acapulcana Garcia Aldrete, 2011
- Lachesilla acapulcanoides Garcia Aldrete, 2011
- Lachesilla aculeata Garcia Aldrete, 1976
- Lachesilla acuminata Mockford, 1991
- Lachesilla acuminiforceps Garcia Aldrete, 1996
- Lachesilla acuminiproctus Garcia Aldrete, 2008
- Lachesilla acutiloba Broadhead & Alison Richards, 1982
- Lachesilla aethiopica (Enderlein, 1902)
- Lachesilla ajuscana Garcia Aldrete, 1990
- Lachesilla albertina Garcia Aldrete, 1992
- Lachesilla aldretei Badonnel, 1986
- Lachesilla aliciae Garcia Aldrete, 2005
- Lachesilla alpejia Garcia Aldrete, 1988
- Lachesilla alpha Garcia Aldrete, 1985
- Lachesilla amacayacuensis Garcia Aldrete, 2010
- Lachesilla amarilla New, 1971
- Lachesilla ambigua Badonnel, 1972
- Lachesilla anahuacensis Mockford, 2002
- Lachesilla andina Garcia Aldrete, 2009
- Lachesilla andra Sommerman, 1946
- Lachesilla anna Sommerman, 1946
- Lachesilla annulata Smithers, Courtenay, 1964
- Lachesilla anomala Badonnel, 1959
- Lachesilla anura Badonnel, 1931
- Lachesilla aptena Garcia Aldrete, 2008
- Lachesilla aquilina Badonnel, 1943
- Lachesilla ariasi Garcia Aldrete, 2004
- Lachesilla arida Chapman, 1930
- Lachesilla arimensis Garcia Aldrete, 2000
- Lachesilla arnae Sommerman, 1946
- Lachesilla aspera Garcia Aldrete, 1990
- Lachesilla asperiforceps Garcia Aldrete, 2001
- Lachesilla asymmetriproctus Garcia Aldrete, 2008
- Lachesilla badonneli Smithers, Courtenay, 1967
- Lachesilla bahiana Garcia Aldrete, 2000
- Lachesilla belemensis Garcia Aldrete, 2000
- Lachesilla bernardi Badonnel, 1938
- Lachesilla beta Garcia Aldrete, 1985
- Lachesilla biannulata Garcia Aldrete, 2005
- Lachesilla bicornata New & Thornton, 1975
- Lachesilla bifurcata Garcia Aldrete, 1986
- Lachesilla bilobata Garcia Aldrete, 1974
- Lachesilla bilunaris Garcia Aldrete, 1996
- Lachesilla bimaculata Garcia Aldrete, 1982
- Lachesilla bimaculatoides Garcia Aldrete, 2008
- Lachesilla bonaerensis Garcia Aldrete, 2004
- Lachesilla bottimeri Mockford and Gurney, 1956
- Lachesilla braheicola Garcia Aldrete, 1990
- Lachesilla brasiliensis Garcia Aldrete, 1997
- Lachesilla braticagua Garcia Aldrete, 2000
- Lachesilla breviforceps Garcia Aldrete, 1974
- Lachesilla brinchangensis New & S. S. Lee, 1991
- Lachesilla broadheadi Garcia Aldrete, 1990
- Lachesilla buettikeri New, 1979
- Lachesilla bugiriana Smithers, Courtenay, 1960
- Lachesilla bulbosiforceps Garcia Aldrete, 2010
- Lachesilla caecilioides Garcia Aldrete, 1981
- Lachesilla cameruna Badonnel, 1943
- Lachesilla capreola New, 1971
- Lachesilla caribe Garcia Aldrete, 1991
- Lachesilla carinata Garcia Aldrete, 1999
- Lachesilla carinatoides Garcia Aldrete, 1999
- Lachesilla carioca Garcia Aldrete, 1997
- Lachesilla carpinteroi Garcia Aldrete, 2010
- Lachesilla castrii Badonnel, 1963
- Lachesilla castroi Thornton & A. K. T. Woo, 1973
- Lachesilla centralis Garcia Aldrete, 1983
- Lachesilla cerorma Garcia Aldrete, 2010
- Lachesilla cesarcardonai Garcia Aldrete, Gonzalez Obando & Saldana Guzman,
- Lachesilla chamula Garcia Aldrete, 1982
- Lachesilla chapmani Sommerman, 1946
- Lachesilla chiapensis Garcia Aldrete, 1974
- Lachesilla chilensis Enderlein, 1926
- Lachesilla chiricahua Garcia Aldrete, 1990
- Lachesilla chrysostigma Badonnel, 1977
- Lachesilla cintalapa Garcia Aldrete, 1983
- Lachesilla cladiumicola Garcia Aldrete, 1999
- Lachesilla clavicularis Garcia Aldrete, 2011
- Lachesilla columnaris Garcia Aldrete, 1976
- Lachesilla concava Garcia Aldrete, 2000
- Lachesilla contraforcepeta Chapman, 1930
- Lachesilla convexa Garcia Aldrete, 2000
- Lachesilla convexicornis Garcia Aldrete, 2008
- Lachesilla corbalanae Garcia Aldrete, 2004
- Lachesilla cornisterna Broadhead & Alison Richards, 1982
- Lachesilla cornuta Badonnel, 1948
- Lachesilla corona Chapman, 1930
- Lachesilla crutifurca Li, Fasheng, 2002
- Lachesilla cuala Garcia Aldrete, 1988
- Lachesilla cuna Garcia Aldrete, 1982
- Lachesilla cupressicola Garcia Aldrete, 1990
- Lachesilla curviforceps Garcia Aldrete, 1974
- Lachesilla curvipila Garcia Aldrete, 1982
- Lachesilla cuzcoensis Garcia Aldrete, 2010
- Lachesilla dasylirionicola Garcia Aldrete, 1990
- Lachesilla delicata Garcia Aldrete, 2005
- Lachesilla delta Garcia Aldrete, 1985
- Lachesilla dentata Garcia Aldrete & Mockford, 2010
- Lachesilla denticulata Garcia Aldrete, 1988
- Lachesilla denticuliforceps Garcia Aldrete, 1996
- Lachesilla diamantina Garcia Aldrete & Da Silva, 2013
- Lachesilla dichodolichna (Li, Fasheng, 2002)
- Lachesilla dilatiforceps Garcia Aldrete, 1996
- Lachesilla dimorpha Lienhard, 1981
- Lachesilla disjuncta Garcia Aldrete, 1988
- Lachesilla dispariforceps Mockford, 1986
- Lachesilla dividiforceps Garcia Aldrete, 1984
- Lachesilla dividiproctus Garcia Aldrete, 2009
- Lachesilla dominicaensis Garcia Aldrete, 1996
- Lachesilla dona Sommerman, 1946
- Lachesilla ecuatoriana Garcia Aldrete, 2000
- Lachesilla eertmoedi Garcia Aldrete, 1990
- Lachesilla erwini Garcia Aldrete, 2008
- Lachesilla estradaorum Garcia Aldrete, 1999
- Lachesilla falcata Garcia Aldrete, 2000
- Lachesilla falcicula Badonnel, 1981
- Lachesilla filicicola Garcia Aldrete, 1999
- Lachesilla floridana Garcia Aldrete, 1999
- Lachesilla forcepeta Chapman, 1930
- Lachesilla furcata Badonnel, 1949
- Lachesilla fusca Badonnel, 1949
- Lachesilla fuscipalpis Badonnel, 1972
- Lachesilla gamma Garcia Aldrete, 1985
- Lachesilla gigantea Badonnel, 1935
- Lachesilla gladiata Garcia Aldrete, 2000
- Lachesilla gracilis Garcia Aldrete, 1988
- Lachesilla graminicola Badonnel, 1986
- Lachesilla grandis Badonnel, 1931
- Lachesilla greeni (Pearman, 1933)
- Lachesilla gridellii (Navas, 1927)
- Lachesilla guatemalensis Garcia Aldrete, 1973
- Lachesilla guayaquilensis Garcia Aldrete, 1997
- Lachesilla guentheri Garcia Aldrete, 1990
- Lachesilla gurneyi Garcia Aldrete, 1990
- Lachesilla hermosa Garcia Aldrete, 1982
- Lachesilla hirsuta Lienhard, 2002
- Lachesilla huasteca Mockford, 2002
- Lachesilla huitoto Saenz Manchola, Garcia Aldrete & Gonzalez Obando,
- Lachesilla iguazuensis Garcia Aldrete, 2004
- Lachesilla ilama Garcia Aldrete, 2014
- Lachesilla intrans Li, Fasheng, 1997
- Lachesilla ixtlanensis Garcia Aldrete & J. A. Casasola Gonzalez, 2012
- Lachesilla jeanae Sommerman, 1946
- Lachesilla juniperana Garcia Aldrete, 1990
- Lachesilla kahuziana Badonnel, 1946
- Lachesilla kathrynae Mockford & Gurney, 1956
- Lachesilla keniensis Broadhead & Alison Richards, 1982
- Lachesilla kerzhneri Günther, 1974
- Lachesilla kikerensis Badonnel, 1959
- Lachesilla kola Sommerman, 1946
- Lachesilla lachataoensis Garcia Aldrete & J. A. Casasola Gonzalez, 2012
- Lachesilla laciniosiforceps Garcia Aldrete, 1999
- Lachesilla lapadoce Garcia Aldrete & Da Silva, 2013
- Lachesilla latiforceps Garcia Aldrete, 2011
- Lachesilla latinerva Badonnel, 1955
- Lachesilla leonilae Garcia Aldrete, 1986
- Lachesilla lienhardi Garcia Aldrete, 1990
- Lachesilla lingua New & Thornton, 1975
- Lachesilla loisae Garcia Aldrete, 1988
- Lachesilla longiforceps Garcia Aldrete, 2008
- Lachesilla longiproctus Garcia Aldrete, 2009
- Lachesilla lugoi Garcia Aldrete, 2014
- Lachesilla lunata Garcia Aldrete, 2008
- Lachesilla macropudenda Garcia Aldrete, 2008
- Lachesilla maculata Garcia Aldrete, 1999
- Lachesilla maculipenna Garcia Aldrete, 1982
- Lachesilla madecassa Badonnel, 1967
- Lachesilla magna Garcia Aldrete, 1996
- Lachesilla magnifica Garcia Aldrete, 1976
- Lachesilla major Chapman, 1930
- Lachesilla marabaensis Garcia Aldrete, 2010
- Lachesilla maracayensis Garcia Aldrete, 2000
- Lachesilla marginata New & Thornton, 1975
- Lachesilla mariateresae Garcia Aldrete, 2004
- Lachesilla mathieui Garcia Aldrete, 1972
- Lachesilla mattogrossensis Garcia Aldrete, 1997
- Lachesilla maya Garcia Aldrete, 1986
- Lachesilla mayorgae Garcia Aldrete, 2000
- Lachesilla megaforcepeta Mockford, 1991
- Lachesilla meinanderi Lienhard, 1998
- Lachesilla merzi Lienhard, 1989
- Lachesilla mesomaculipenna Garcia Aldrete, 2008
- Lachesilla mexica Garcia Aldrete, 1982
- Lachesilla michiliensis Garcia Aldrete, 1991
- Lachesilla microplatyclatae Li, Fasheng, 1995
- Lachesilla micrura Badonnel, 1955
- Lachesilla minipudenda Garcia Aldrete, 2008
- Lachesilla mockfordi Garcia Aldrete, 1990
- Lachesilla mombachensis Garcia Aldrete, 2001
- Lachesilla mongolica Günther, 1981
- Lachesilla monocera Li, Fasheng, 2002
- Lachesilla monticola Garcia Aldrete, 1975
- Lachesilla mucronata Badonnel, 1946
- Lachesilla muncunilli (Navás, 1913)
- Lachesilla mutabilis Turner, B. D. & Cheke, 1983
- Lachesilla nadleri Garcia Aldrete, 1996
- Lachesilla neoleonensis Garcia Aldrete, 1974
- Lachesilla neotenica Garcia Aldrete, 2008
- Lachesilla nevermanni (Navás, 1933)
- Lachesilla newi Garcia Aldrete, 1990
- Lachesilla nigripalpa Turner, B. D. & Cheke, 1983
- Lachesilla nita Sommerman, 1946
- Lachesilla novemimaculata Li, Fasheng, 1993
- Lachesilla nubilis (Aaron, 1886)
- Lachesilla nubiloides Garcia Aldrete, 1975
- Lachesilla nuptialis Badonnel & Garcia Aldrete, 1980
- Lachesilla oaxacana Garcia Aldrete, 2001
- Lachesilla obrieni Garcia Aldrete, 1982
- Lachesilla otomi Mockford, 2002
- Lachesilla pachyura Badonnel, 1955
- Lachesilla pacifica Chapman, 1930
- Lachesilla pallida (Chapman, 1930)
- Lachesilla palmera New, 1971
- Lachesilla palmicola Garcia Aldrete, 1981
- Lachesilla papillata Garcia Aldrete, 2000
- Lachesilla papilloproctus Garcia Aldrete, 2008
- Lachesilla patula Garcia Aldrete, 2000
- Lachesilla patzunensis Garcia Aldrete, 1972
- Lachesilla paulista Garcia Aldrete, 1982
- Lachesilla peckorum Garcia Aldrete, 2009
- Lachesilla pedicularia (Linnaeus, 1758) (cosmopolitan grain barklouse)
- Lachesilla penta Sommerman, 1946
- Lachesilla pentaoides Garcia Aldrete, 2008
- Lachesilla pereirorum Garcia Aldrete, 2004
- Lachesilla perezi Garcia Aldrete, 1983
- Lachesilla picticeps Mockford, 1986
- Lachesilla picticepsoides Garcia Aldrete, 1997
- Lachesilla pigmentifrons Garcia Aldrete, 2008
- Lachesilla pigmentigena Garcia Aldrete, 2008
- Lachesilla pigmentipenna Garcia Aldrete, 2008
- Lachesilla pigmentithorax Garcia Aldrete, 1996
- Lachesilla pilosiforceps Garcia Aldrete, 2010
- Lachesilla pilosipenna Garcia Aldrete, 2010
- Lachesilla pinicola Garcia Aldrete, 1990
- Lachesilla pisaqensis Garcia Aldrete & Mockford, 2010
- Lachesilla platycladae Li, Fasheng, 1995
- Lachesilla punctata (Banks, 1905)
- Lachesilla putumayensis Saenz Manchola, Garcia Aldrete & Gonzalez Obando,
- Lachesilla qianshanensis (Li, Fasheng, 2002)
- Lachesilla quercicola Garcia Aldrete, 1990
- Lachesilla quercus (Kolbe, 1880)
- Lachesilla querpina Garcia Aldrete, 1991
- Lachesilla rectiforceps Garcia Aldrete, 1999
- Lachesilla rectigladia Broadhead & Alison Richards, 1982
- Lachesilla regiomontana Garcia Aldrete, 1974
- Lachesilla rena Sommerman, 1946
- Lachesilla renicula Garcia Aldrete, 2000
- Lachesilla reyesi Garcia Aldrete, 1991
- Lachesilla rhizophila Li, Fasheng, 2002
- Lachesilla riegeli Sommerman, 1946
- Lachesilla robusta Garcia Aldrete, 2008
- Lachesilla robustiforceps Garcia Aldrete, 2008
- Lachesilla rossica Roesler, 1953
- Lachesilla rufa (Walsh, 1863)
- Lachesilla rugosa Garcia Aldrete, 1996
- Lachesilla ruizabreorum Garcia Aldrete, 2004
- Lachesilla sabinae Li, Fasheng, 1993
- Lachesilla salamana Garcia Aldrete, 1990
- Lachesilla sandersoni Mockford, 1974
- Lachesilla sauteri Lienhard, 1977
- Lachesilla sclera New & Thornton, 1975
- Lachesilla septenaria Li, Fasheng, 2002
- Lachesilla silvatica Garcia Aldrete, 1988
- Lachesilla smithersi Garcia Aldrete, 1990
- Lachesilla soaresi Badonnel, 1973
- Lachesilla sola Garcia Aldrete, 1982
- Lachesilla sommermanae Garcia Aldrete, 1990
- Lachesilla sonamarga Garcia Aldrete, 1988
- Lachesilla spathuliforceps Garcia Aldrete, 2008
- Lachesilla spilotipenna Garcia Aldrete, 2008
- Lachesilla spiniforceps Garcia Aldrete, 2008
- Lachesilla squamiforceps Garcia Aldrete, 2010
- Lachesilla striatiforceps Garcia Aldrete, 2011
- Lachesilla sulcata Garcia Aldrete, 1986
- Lachesilla symmetriproctus Garcia Aldrete, 2008
- Lachesilla szirakii Garcia Aldrete, 2009
- Lachesilla tambopatensis Garcia Aldrete, 2008
- Lachesilla tanaidana Roesler, 1953
- Lachesilla tapanatepeca Garcia Aldrete, 1986
- Lachesilla tapiabarqueroi Garcia Aldrete, 2001
- Lachesilla taxodicola Garcia Aldrete, 1973
- Lachesilla tectorum Badonnel, 1931
- Lachesilla tehuautlensis Garcia Aldrete, 2000
- Lachesilla tekwaensis Smithers, Courtenay, 1999
- Lachesilla teresiana Garcia Aldrete, 1997
- Lachesilla texana
- Lachesilla texcocana Garcia Aldrete, 1972
- Lachesilla thorntoni Garcia Aldrete, 1990
- Lachesilla tlapaensis Garcia Aldrete, 2007
- Lachesilla torulosa Garcia Aldrete, 2000
- Lachesilla trinidadensis Garcia Aldrete, 1996
- Lachesilla tropica Garcia Aldrete, 1982
- Lachesilla trujillensis Garcia Aldrete, 1995
- Lachesilla trunca Garcia Aldrete, 2000
- Lachesilla tuita Garcia Aldrete, 1988
- Lachesilla turneri Garcia Aldrete, 1990
- Lachesilla typhicola Garcia Aldrete, 1999
- Lachesilla ultima Garcia Aldrete, 1982
- Lachesilla unsijensis Garcia Aldrete & J. A. Casasola Gonzalez, 2012
- Lachesilla valvula New & Thornton, 1975
- Lachesilla veneper Garcia Aldrete, 1997
- Lachesilla williamsi Garcia Aldrete, 2010
- Lachesilla wongae Garcia Aldrete, 1990
- Lachesilla wutaishanensis (Li, Fasheng, 2002)
- Lachesilla xalapensis Garcia Aldrete, 2001
- Lachesilla ximaensis Li, Fasheng, 2002
- Lachesilla yakima Mockford and Garcia Aldrete, 1974
- Lachesilla yanomami Mockford, 1996
- Lachesilla yanomamioides Garcia Aldrete, 1996
- Lachesilla yucateca Mockford, 2002
- Lachesilla yuccalnicola Garcia Aldrete, 1990
- Lachesilla zapoteca Garcia Aldrete, 1975
- Lachesilla zaragozai Garcia Aldrete & Mockford, 2010
- Lachesilla zeta Garcia Aldrete, 1985
