= Lachesilla typhicola =

Scientific classification
- Kingdom: Animalia
- Phylum: Arthropoda
- Clade: Pancrustacea
- Class: Insecta
- Order: Psocodea
- Family: Lachesillidae
- Genus: Lachesilla
- Species: L. typhicola

Binomial name
- Lachesilla typhicola Garcia Aldrete, 1999

Species of booklouse

Lachesilla typhicola is a species of fateful barklouse in the family Lachesillidae. It is found in North America.
