= Lachesilla tectorum =

Scientific classification
- Kingdom: Animalia
- Phylum: Arthropoda
- Clade: Pancrustacea
- Class: Insecta
- Order: Psocodea
- Family: Lachesillidae
- Genus: Lachesilla
- Species: L. tectorum

Binomial name
- Lachesilla tectorum Badonne, 1931

Species of booklouse

Lachesilla tectorum is a species of Psocoptera from the Lachesillidae family that is endemic to the Canary Islands.
