= Lachesilla corona =

Scientific classification
- Kingdom: Animalia
- Phylum: Arthropoda
- Clade: Pancrustacea
- Class: Insecta
- Order: Psocodea
- Family: Lachesillidae
- Genus: Lachesilla
- Species: L. corona

Binomial name
- Lachesilla corona Chapman, 1930

Species of booklouse

Lachesilla corona is a species of fateful barklouse in the family Lachesillidae. It is found in North America.
