= Lachesilla rena =

Scientific classification
- Kingdom: Animalia
- Phylum: Arthropoda
- Clade: Pancrustacea
- Class: Insecta
- Order: Psocodea
- Family: Lachesillidae
- Genus: Lachesilla
- Species: L. rena

Binomial name
- Lachesilla rena Sommerman, 1946

Species of booklouse

Lachesilla rena is a species of fateful barklouse in the family Lachesillidae. It is found in the Caribbean Sea, Central America, and North America.
