= Anomopsocus amabilis =

Scientific classification
- Domain: Eukaryota
- Kingdom: Animalia
- Phylum: Arthropoda
- Class: Insecta
- Order: Psocodea
- Family: Lachesillidae
- Genus: Anomopsocus
- Species: A. amabilis

Binomial name
- Anomopsocus amabilis (Walsh, 1862)

Species of insect

Anomopsocus amabilis is a species of fateful barklouse in the family Lachesillidae. It is found in North America.
