= Lachesilla kathrynae =

Scientific classification
- Kingdom: Animalia
- Phylum: Arthropoda
- Clade: Pancrustacea
- Class: Insecta
- Order: Psocodea
- Family: Lachesillidae
- Genus: Lachesilla
- Species: L. kathrynae

Binomial name
- Lachesilla kathrynae Mockford & Gurney, 1956

Species of booklouse

Lachesilla kathrynae is a species of fateful barklouse in the family Lachesillidae. It is found in Central America and North America.
