= Lachesilla rossica =

Scientific classification
- Kingdom: Animalia
- Phylum: Arthropoda
- Clade: Pancrustacea
- Class: Insecta
- Order: Psocodea
- Family: Lachesillidae
- Genus: Lachesilla
- Species: L. rossica

Binomial name
- Lachesilla rossica Roesler, 1953

Species of booklouse

Lachesilla rossica is a rare psocopteran species described from southern Russia. The species can be found in Ukraine as well. It was discovered many years later in the valley of the Allondon river, near Geneva, Switzerland. In the latter habitat, it occurs together with Lachesilla bernardi, a congeneric species that is visually very similar to it: the examination of genitalia with a microscope is the only way to differentiate the two species. It was reported recently from Albania too.
