= Lachesilla tropica =

Scientific classification
- Kingdom: Animalia
- Phylum: Arthropoda
- Clade: Pancrustacea
- Class: Insecta
- Order: Psocodea
- Family: Lachesillidae
- Genus: Lachesilla
- Species: L. tropica

Binomial name
- Lachesilla tropica Garcia Aldrete, 1982

Species of booklouse

Lachesilla tropica is a species of fateful barklouse in the family Lachesillidae. It is found in the Caribbean Sea, Central America, and North America.
