= Lachesilla greeni =

Scientific classification
- Kingdom: Animalia
- Phylum: Arthropoda
- Clade: Pancrustacea
- Class: Insecta
- Order: Psocodea
- Family: Lachesillidae
- Genus: Lachesilla
- Species: L. greeni

Binomial name
- Lachesilla greeni (Pearman, 1933)

Species of booklouse

Lachesilla greeni is a species of Psocoptera from the Lachesillidae family that can be found in Austria, Azores, Belgium, France, Germany, Italy, Poland, Portugal, Romania, Spain, and Switzerland. It can also be found in Near East.
