= Lachesilla nubilis =

Scientific classification
- Kingdom: Animalia
- Phylum: Arthropoda
- Clade: Pancrustacea
- Class: Insecta
- Order: Psocodea
- Family: Lachesillidae
- Genus: Lachesilla
- Species: L. nubilis

Binomial name
- Lachesilla nubilis (Aaron, 1886)

Species of booklouse

Lachesilla nubilis is a species of fateful barklouse in the family Lachesillidae. It is found in Central America, North America, and Oceania.
