= Lachesilla meinanderi =

Scientific classification
- Kingdom: Animalia
- Phylum: Arthropoda
- Clade: Pancrustacea
- Class: Insecta
- Order: Psocodea
- Family: Lachesillidae
- Genus: Lachesilla
- Species: L. meinanderi

Binomial name
- Lachesilla meinanderi (Lienhard, 1938)

Species of booklouse

Lachesilla meinanderi is a species of Psocoptera from the Lachesillidae family that is endemic to the Canary Islands. The habitat of Lachesilla meinanderi is terrestrial.
