= Lachesilla pacifica =

Scientific classification
- Kingdom: Animalia
- Phylum: Arthropoda
- Clade: Pancrustacea
- Class: Insecta
- Order: Psocodea
- Family: Lachesillidae
- Genus: Lachesilla
- Species: L. pacifica

Binomial name
- Lachesilla pacifica (Chapman, 1930)

Species of booklouse

Lachesilla pacifica is a species of Psocoptera from the Lachesillidae family that can be found in France and Switzerland.
