= Lachesilla penta =

Scientific classification
- Kingdom: Animalia
- Phylum: Arthropoda
- Clade: Pancrustacea
- Class: Insecta
- Order: Psocodea
- Family: Lachesillidae
- Genus: Lachesilla
- Species: L. penta

Binomial name
- Lachesilla penta Sommerman, 1946

Species of booklouse

Lachesilla penta is a species of fateful barklouse in the family Lachesillidae, found in Central America and North America.
