= Lachesilla dimorpha =

Scientific classification
- Kingdom: Animalia
- Phylum: Arthropoda
- Clade: Pancrustacea
- Class: Insecta
- Order: Psocodea
- Family: Lachesillidae
- Genus: Lachesilla
- Species: L. dimorpha

Binomial name
- Lachesilla dimorpha Lienhard, 1981

Species of booklouse

Lachesilla dimorpha is a species of Psocoptera from the Lachesillidae family that can be found in Cyprus, Greece, Italy, and Spain. It can also be found in Near East and North Africa.
