= Lachesilla sauteri =

Scientific classification
- Kingdom: Animalia
- Phylum: Arthropoda
- Clade: Pancrustacea
- Class: Insecta
- Order: Psocodea
- Family: Lachesillidae
- Genus: Lachesilla
- Species: L. sauteri

Binomial name
- Lachesilla sauteri Lienhard, 1977

Species of booklouse

Lachesilla sauteri is a species of Psocoptera from the Lachesillidae family that is endemic to Switzerland.
