= Lachesilla forcepeta =

Scientific classification
- Kingdom: Animalia
- Phylum: Arthropoda
- Clade: Pancrustacea
- Class: Insecta
- Order: Psocodea
- Family: Lachesillidae
- Genus: Lachesilla
- Species: L. forcepeta

Binomial name
- Lachesilla forcepeta Chapman, 1930

Species of booklouse

Lachesilla forcepeta is a species of fateful barklouse in the family Lachesillidae. It is found in Central America and North America.
