= Lachesilla rufa =

Scientific classification
- Kingdom: Animalia
- Phylum: Arthropoda
- Clade: Pancrustacea
- Class: Insecta
- Order: Psocodea
- Family: Lachesillidae
- Genus: Lachesilla
- Species: L. rufa

Binomial name
- Lachesilla rufa (Walsh, 1863)

Species of booklouse

Lachesilla rufa is a species of fateful barklouse in the family Lachesillidae. It is found in North America.
