= Lachesilla tanaidana =

Scientific classification
- Kingdom: Animalia
- Phylum: Arthropoda
- Clade: Pancrustacea
- Class: Insecta
- Order: Psocodea
- Family: Lachesillidae
- Genus: Lachesilla
- Species: L. tanaidana

Binomial name
- Lachesilla tanaidana Roesler, 1953

Species of booklouse

Lachesilla tanaidana is a species of Psocoptera from the Lachesillidae family that can be found in Germany, Hungary, Portugal, Sardinia, Switzerland, and Ukraine.
