= Lachesilla kola =

Scientific classification
- Kingdom: Animalia
- Phylum: Arthropoda
- Clade: Pancrustacea
- Class: Insecta
- Order: Psocodea
- Family: Lachesillidae
- Genus: Lachesilla
- Species: L. kola

Binomial name
- Lachesilla kola Sommerman, 1946

Species of booklouse

Lachesilla kola is a species of fateful barklouse in the family Lachesillidae. It is found in Central America and North America.
