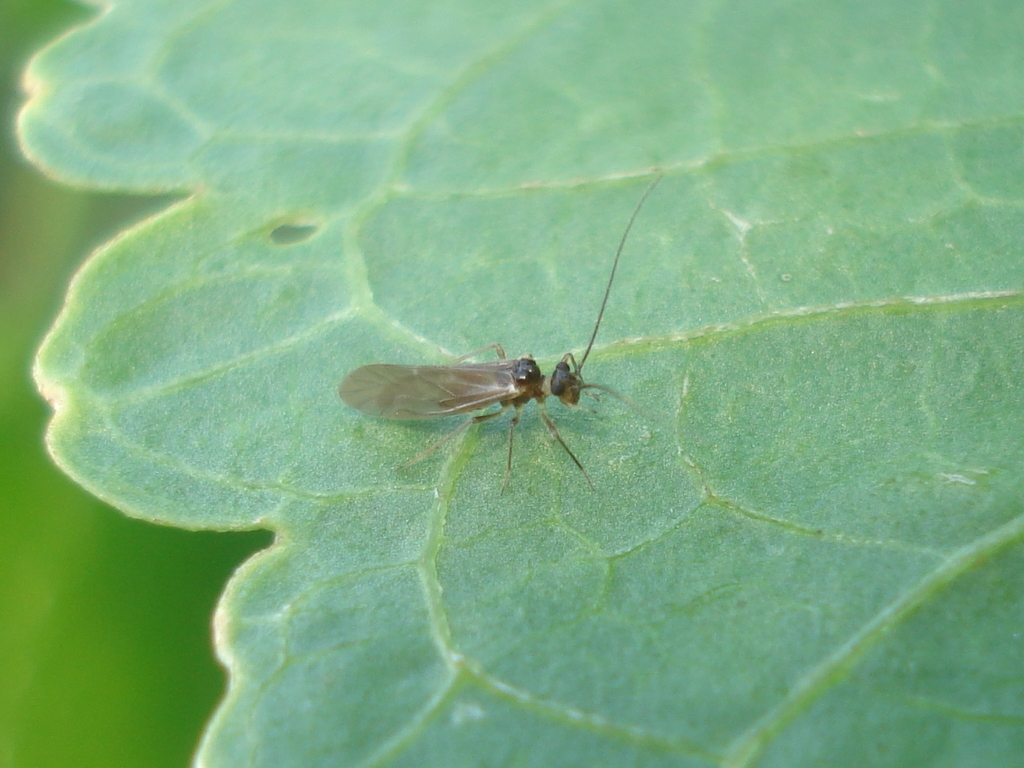

Scientific classification
- Kingdom: Animalia
- Phylum: Arthropoda
- Clade: Pancrustacea
- Class: Insecta
- Order: Psocodea
- Family: Lachesillidae
- Genus: Lachesilla
- Species: L. pedicularia

Binomial name
- Lachesilla pedicularia (Linnaeus, 1758)

= Lachesilla pedicularia =

Species of booklouse

Lachesilla pedicularia is a species of Psocoptera from the family Lachesillidae. It is commonly known as cosmopolitan grain barklouse or cosmopolitan grain psocid and, as these names suggests, it has an almost cosmopolitan distribution.

== Description ==
Lachesilla pedicularia is 1.5-2 mm long. It is often macropterous (with long wings), but brachypterous (with short wings) individuals also occur.

Some features distinguishing this from other species of Lachesilla are the abdomen having brown stripes, the forewing being hairless, wing vein R1 meeting the wing edge almost at a right angle, and several other wing veins being marked with brown.

There are also features in the genitalia. The subgenital plate of females forms a simple curved shape, while the hypandrium of males has simple (not forked) appendages.

== Habitat ==
This species occurs on the trunks and (to a lesser extent) branches of a range of trees, including beech, birch, broom, oak, pine, spruce, and yew. It is also known from haystacks, straw bales, nests of robins, barns, houses, and stored grain.
