= Anomopsocus =

Scientific classification
- Domain: Eukaryota
- Kingdom: Animalia
- Phylum: Arthropoda
- Class: Insecta
- Order: Psocodea
- Infraorder: Homilopsocidea
- Family: Lachesillidae
- Genus: Anomopsocus; Roesler, 1940

Genus of booklice

Anomopsocus is a genus of fateful barklice in the family Lachesillidae. There are at least two described species in Anomopsocus.

== Species ==
These two species belong to the genus Anomopsocus:

- Anomopsocus amabilis (Walsh, 1862)
- Anomopsocus radiolosus (Roesler, 1940)
