= Lachesilla bernardi =

Scientific classification
- Kingdom: Animalia
- Phylum: Arthropoda
- Clade: Pancrustacea
- Class: Insecta
- Order: Psocodea
- Family: Lachesillidae
- Genus: Lachesilla
- Species: L. bernardi

Binomial name
- Lachesilla bernardi Badonnel, 1938

Species of booklouse

Lachesilla bernardi is a species of Psocoptera from the Lachesillidae family that can be found in Austria, Croatia, Cyprus, France, Greece, Hungary, Italy, Poland, Portugal, Romania, Spain, and Switzerland. It can also be found in Near East.
