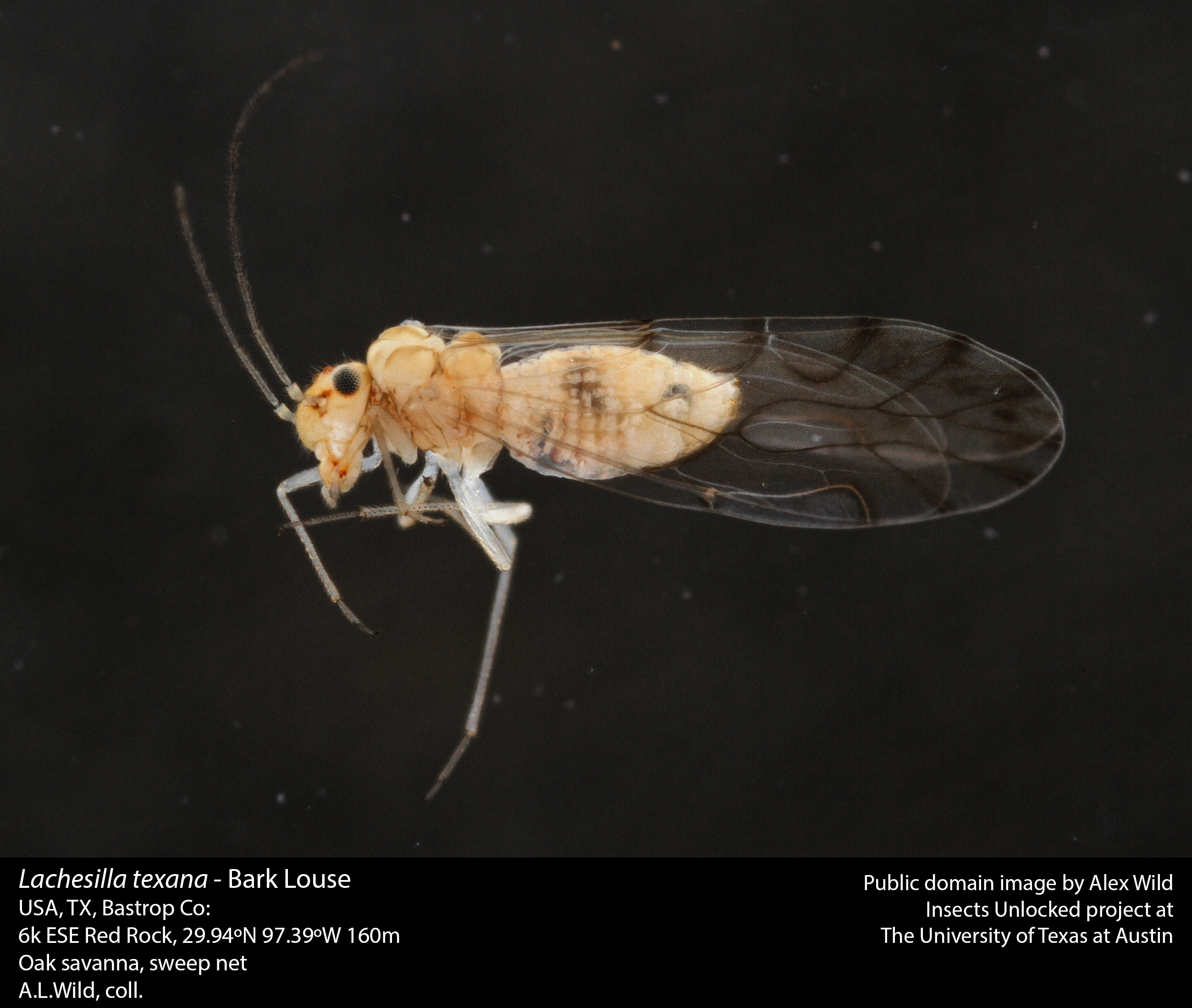

Scientific classification
- Kingdom: Animalia
- Phylum: Arthropoda
- Clade: Pancrustacea
- Class: Insecta
- Order: Psocodea
- Family: Lachesillidae
- Genus: Lachesilla
- Species: L. texana

Binomial name
- Lachesilla texana Mockford & Garcia Aldrete, 2010

= Lachesilla texana =

Species of booklouse

Lachesilla texana is a species of fateful barklouse in the family Lachesillidae.
