= Lachesilla merzi =

Scientific classification
- Kingdom: Animalia
- Phylum: Arthropoda
- Clade: Pancrustacea
- Class: Insecta
- Order: Psocodea
- Family: Lachesillidae
- Genus: Lachesilla
- Species: L. merzi

Binomial name
- Lachesilla merzi (Lienhard, 1989)

Species of booklouse

Lachesilla merzi is a species of Psocoptera from the Lachesillidae family that is endemic to Spain.
