= Lachesilla quercus =

Scientific classification
- Kingdom: Animalia
- Phylum: Arthropoda
- Clade: Pancrustacea
- Class: Insecta
- Order: Psocodea
- Family: Lachesillidae
- Genus: Lachesilla
- Species: L. quercus

Binomial name
- Lachesilla quercus (Kolbe, 1880)

Species of booklouse

Lachesilla quercus is a species of Psocoptera from the Lachesillidae family that can be found on Azores, Cyprus and Canary Islands, and in such countries as Belarus, Croatia, Finland, France, Germany, Great Britain, Greece, Italy, Latvia, Luxembourg, Poland, Romania, Spain, Switzerland, and Scandinavia (except for Denmark).
