= Allondon =

River in eastern France and Switzerland

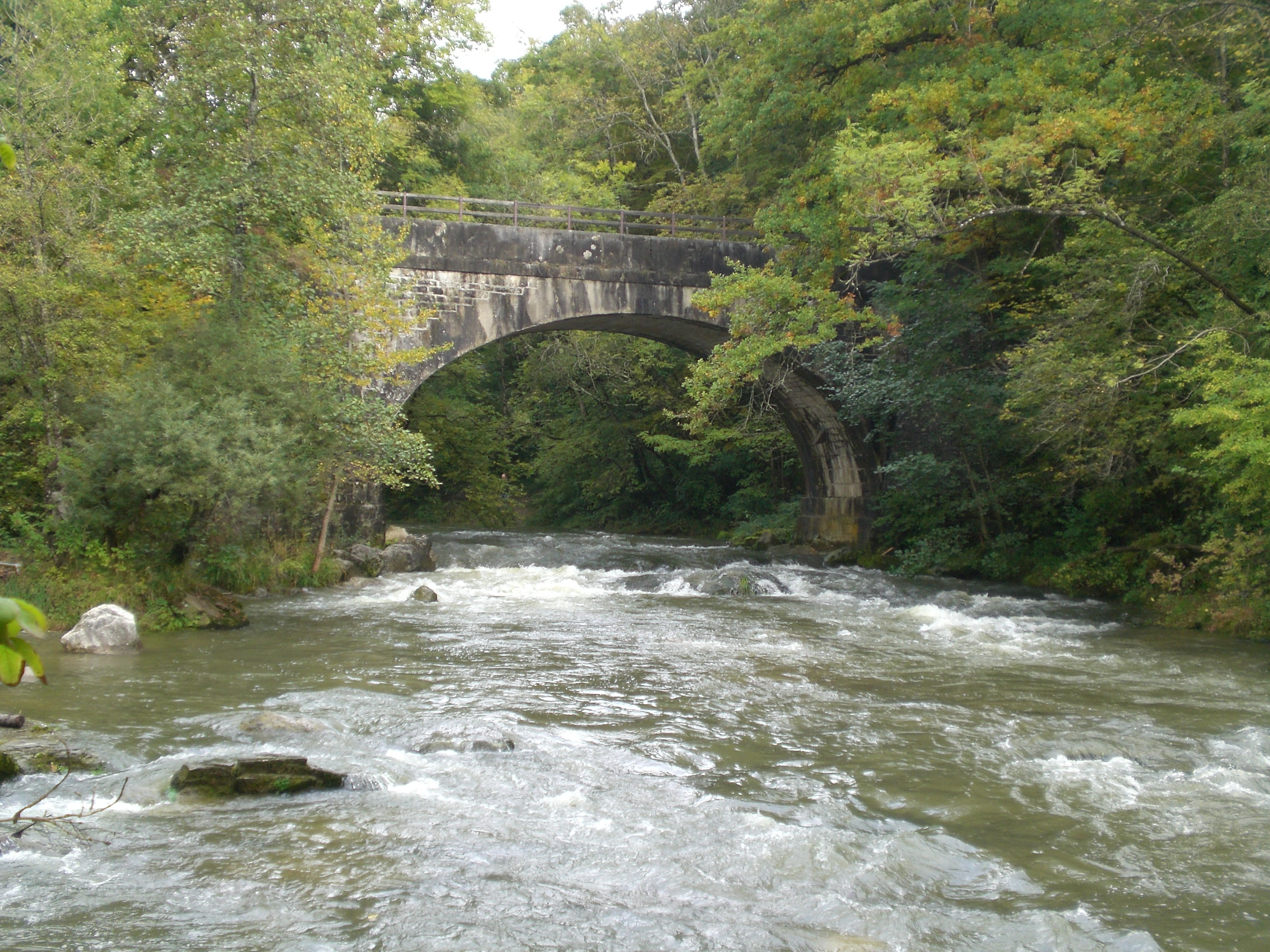

- Location within France Location within Auvergne-Rhône-Alpes

Location
- Country: France
- Department: Ain
- Country: Switzerland
- Canton: Geneva

Physical characteristics
- Source
  - location: Échenevex, France
  - elevation: 649 m (2,129 ft)
- Mouth: Rhône
  - coordinates: 46.1769°N 6.01°E
- Length: 17.9 km (11.1 mi)
- Basin size: 148 km^{2} (57 sq mi)
- Discharge
  - average: 2.5 m^{3}/s (88 cu ft/s)

Basin features
- Progression: Rhône→ Mediterranean Sea

The Allondon (French pronunciation: [alɔ̃dɔ̃]) is a river in France (Auvergne-Rhône-Alpes region) and Switzerland (canton of Geneva). It is 17.9 km (11.1 mi) long, of which 6.1 km in Switzerland and 2.5 km on the French–Swiss border. Its source is located at 649 m (2,129 ft) elevation in the commune of Échenevex in the Ain department in eastern France. It flows into the Rhône at the village of Russin in the canton of Geneva in Switzerland. Its catchment area is 148 km^{2} (57 sq mi), of which 137 km^{2} in France. It is home to the only recently known population of the rare insect Lachesilla rossica.

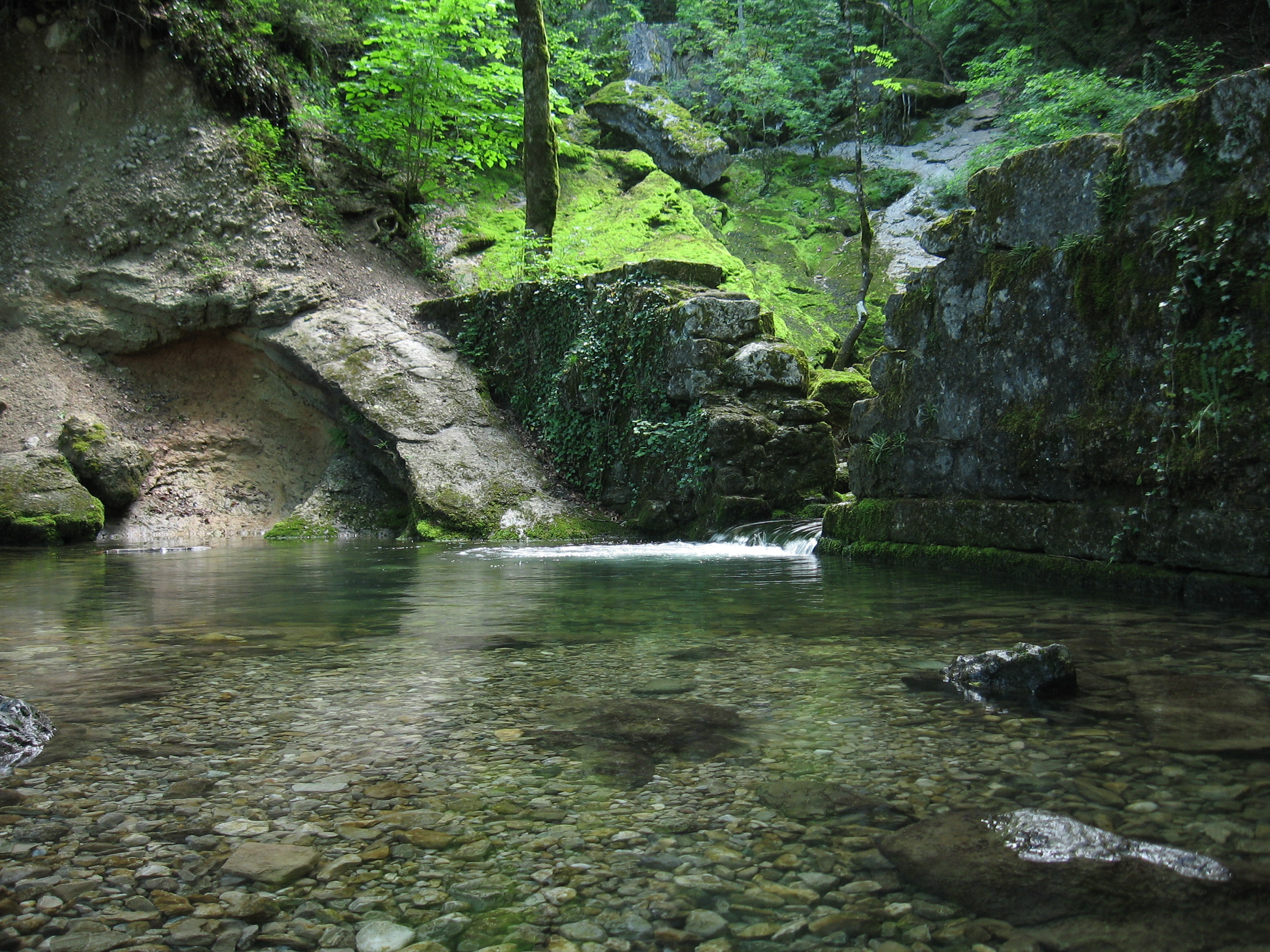
The source of the Allondon in Échenevex

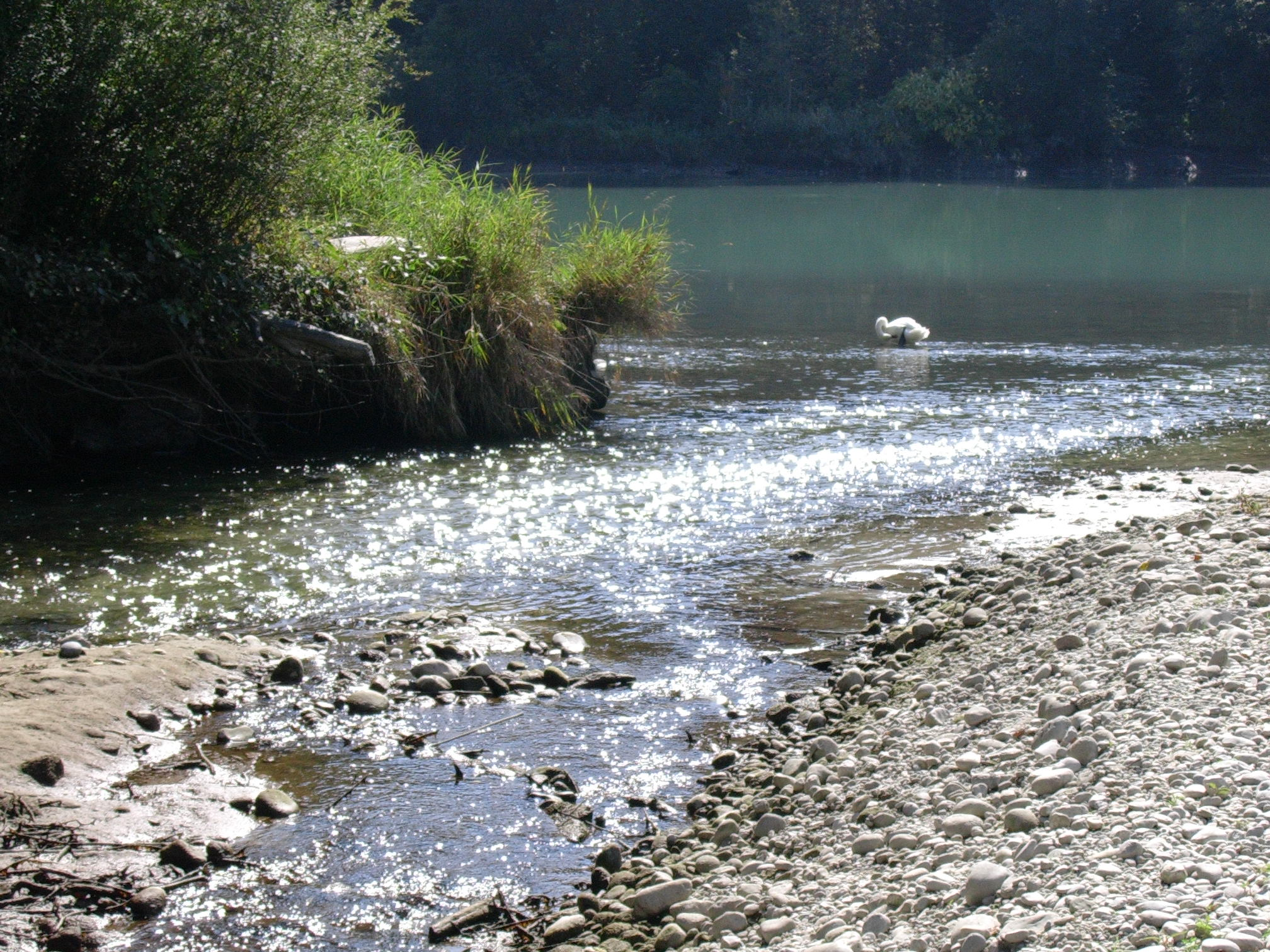
The Allondon meets the Rhône

== See also ==
- List of rivers of France
- List of rivers of Switzerland
