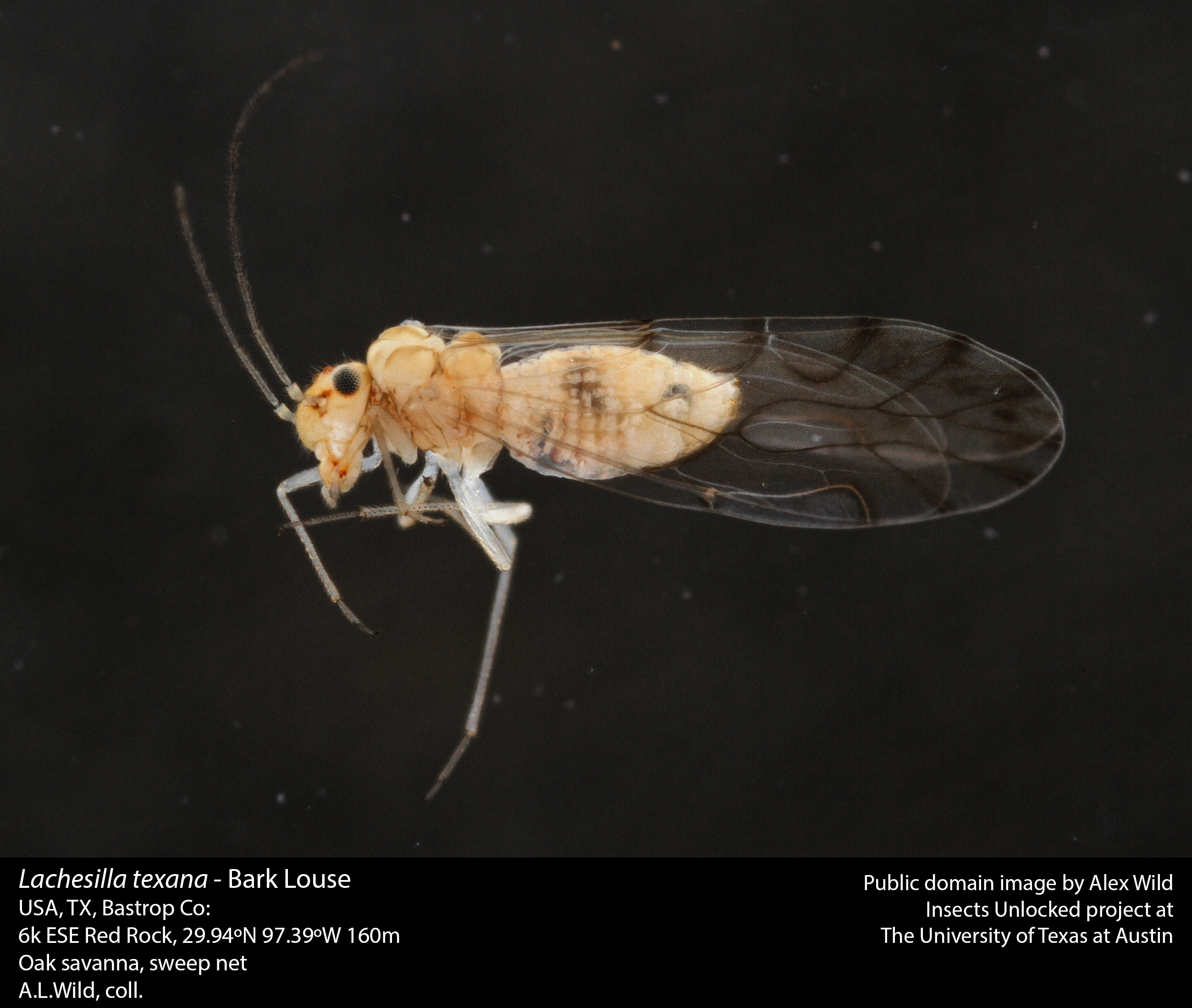
- Lachesilla texana

Scientific classification
- Kingdom: Animalia
- Phylum: Arthropoda
- Clade: Pancrustacea
- Class: Insecta
- Order: Psocodea
- Family: Lachesillidae
- Subfamily: Lachesillinae
- Genus: Lachesilla; Westwood, 1840

= Lachesilla =

Genus of booklice

Lachesilla is the main genus in the psocopteran family Lachesillidae. Frequent species in the Northern hemisphere include Lachesilla quercus and Lachesilla pedicularia. Some species are localized: Lachesilla merzi has been collected only once in Spain and Lachesilla rossica, apart from the original specimens that were found in southern Russia, is only known from the Valley of the Allondon river, near Geneva, Switzerland (and from one find in Albania in 2015).

There are 361 recognized species in Lachesilla.

== See also ==
- List of Lachesilla species
