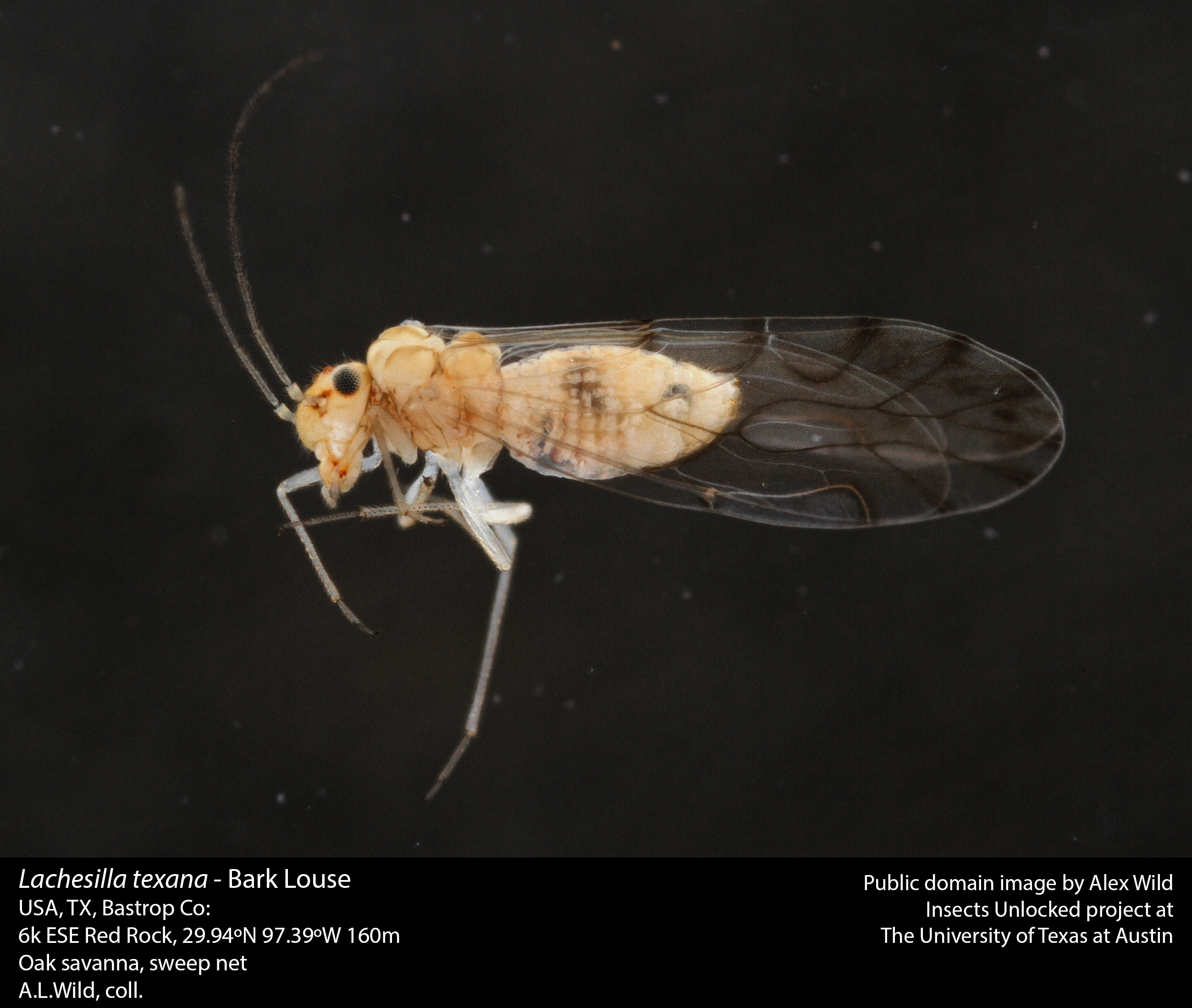
- Lachesilla texana

Scientific classification
- Kingdom: Animalia
- Phylum: Arthropoda
- Clade: Pancrustacea
- Class: Insecta
- Order: Psocodea
- Suborder: Psocomorpha
- Infraorder: Homilopsocidea
- Family: Lachesillidae

= Lachesillidae =

Family of booklice

Lachesillidae (or fateful barklice) is a family of Psocodea (formerly Psocoptera) belonging to the suborder Psocomorpha. Members of the family are characterized by a rounded, free areola postica in their wings. Males have diverse sclerotized genitalic structures. The family includes more than 400 species, most of them in the genus Lachesilla.

== Genera ==
These 26 genera belong to the family Lachesillidae:

- Acantholachesilla^{c g}
- Amazolachesilla^{c g}
- Anomolachesilla^{c g}
- Anomopsocus Roesler, 1940^{i c g b}
- Antilachesilla^{c g}
- Archaelachesis^{c g}
- Ceratolachesillus^{c g}
- Cuzcolachesilla^{c g}
- Cyclolachesillus^{c g}
- Dagualachesilla^{c g}
- Dagualachesilloides^{c g}
- Ectolachesilla^{c g}
- Eolachesilla^{c g}
- Graphocaecilius^{c g}
- Hemicaecilius^{c g}
- Homoeolachesilla^{c g}
- Lachesilla Westwood, 1840^{i c g b}
- Mesolachesilla^{c g}
- Nadleria^{c g}
- Nanolachesilla Mockford and Sullivan, 1986^{i c g}
- Notolachesilla^{c g}
- Prolachesilla Mockford and Sullivan, 1986^{i c g}
- Tricholachesilla^{c g}
- Waoraniella^{c g}
- Zangilachesilla^{c g}
- Zonolachesillus^{c g}

Data sources: i = ITIS, c = Catalogue of Life, g = GBIF, b = Bugguide.net

== Sources ==
- Lienhard, C. & Smithers, C. N. 2002. Psocoptera (Insecta): World Catalogue and Bibliography. Instrumenta Biodiversitatis, vol. 5. Muséum d'histoire naturelle, Genève.
