= Embidopsocus enderleini =

Scientific classification
- Kingdom: Animalia
- Phylum: Arthropoda
- Class: Insecta
- Order: Psocodea
- Family: Liposcelididae
- Genus: Embidopsocus
- Species: E. enderleini

Binomial name
- Embidopsocus enderleini (Ribaga, 1905)

Species of booklouse

Embidopsocus enderleini is a species of Psocoptera from the Liposcelididae family that can be found in Great Britain and Ireland. The species are brown coloured.
