= Liposcelis entomophila =

Scientific classification
- Kingdom: Animalia
- Phylum: Arthropoda
- Clade: Pancrustacea
- Class: Insecta
- Order: Psocodea
- Family: Liposcelididae
- Genus: Liposcelis
- Species: L. entomophila

Binomial name
- Liposcelis entomophila (Enderlein, 1907)

Species of booklouse

Liposcelis entomophila is a species of booklouse in the family Liposcelididae. It is found in Africa, Australia, the Caribbean Sea, Europe and Northern Asia (excluding China), Central America, North America, South America, and Southern Asia.
