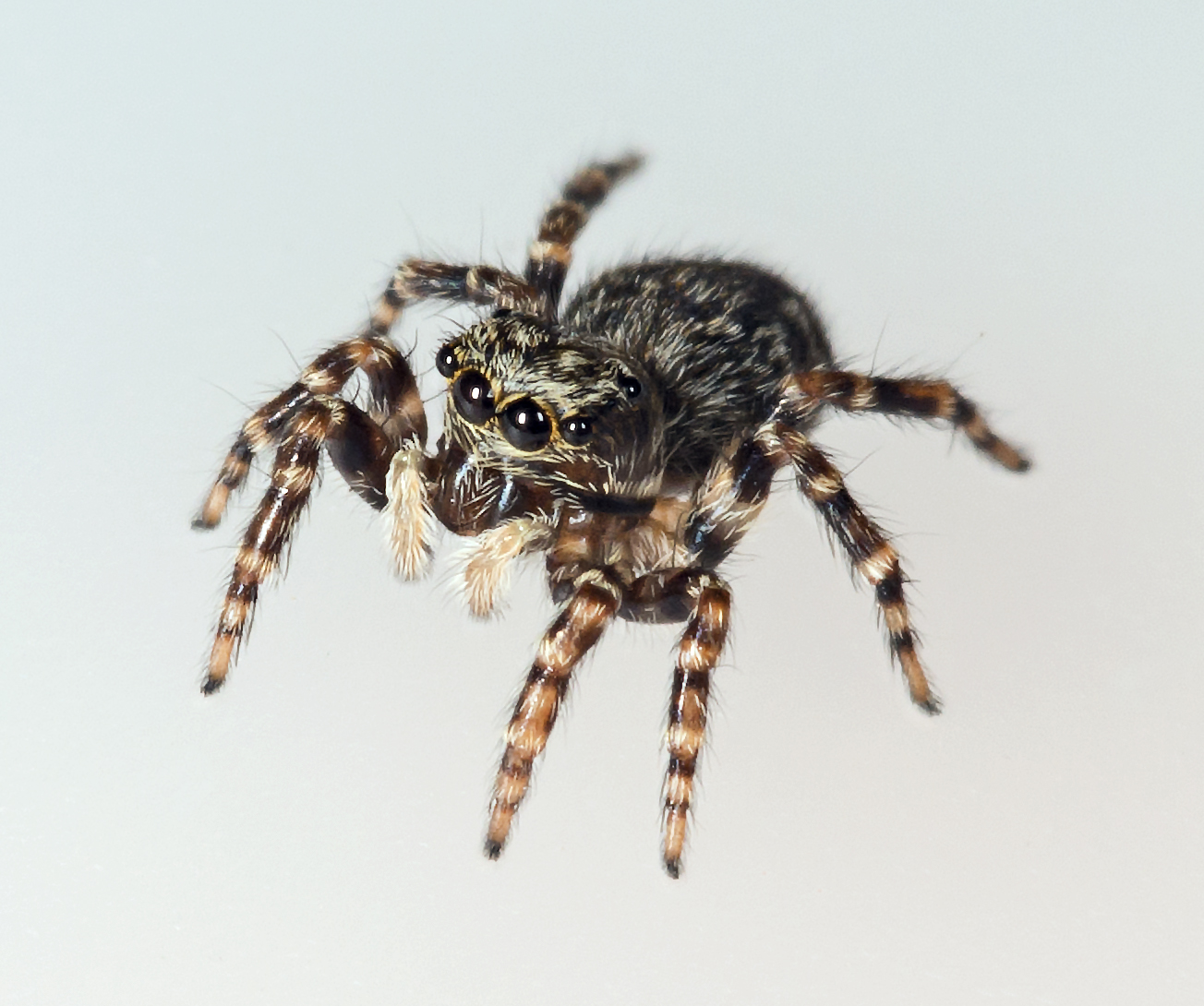
- Adult female

Scientific classification
- Kingdom: Animalia
- Phylum: Arthropoda
- Subphylum: Chelicerata
- Class: Arachnida
- Order: Araneae
- Infraorder: Araneomorphae
- Family: Salticidae
- Genus: Pseudeuophrys
- Species: P. lanigera

Binomial name
- Pseudeuophrys lanigera (Simon, 1871)

Synonyms
- Attus bimaculatus Attus satageus Attus triangulifer Attus laniger Euophrys lanigera Euophrys triangulifera Phlegra variegata Aelurillus tristis

= Pseudeuophrys lanigera =

Species of spider

Pseudeuophrys lanigera is a species of jumping spider (family Salticidae) that is distributed throughout Europe.

== Description ==
Males reach a body length of three to four millimeters, with females up to five mm. This species is very similar to Pseudeuophrys erratica, which is rarer and found below the bark of trees on forest fringes. As P. lanigera is mostly found inside buildings, adults can be found even in deep winter. It is better suited to the dry climate of modern concrete architecture than other salticids in the area like Salticus scenicus. Adults can be found the whole year.

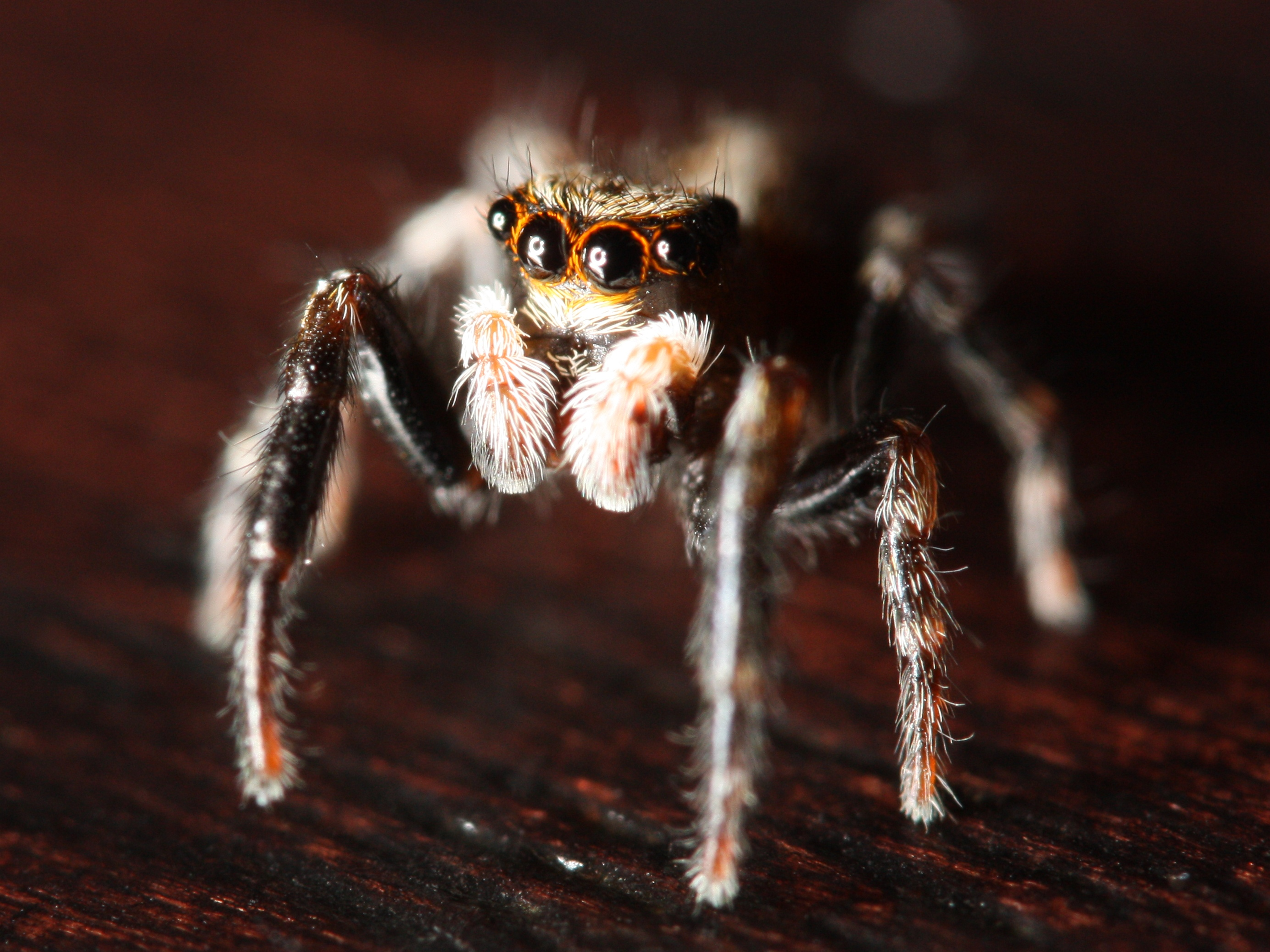
Male

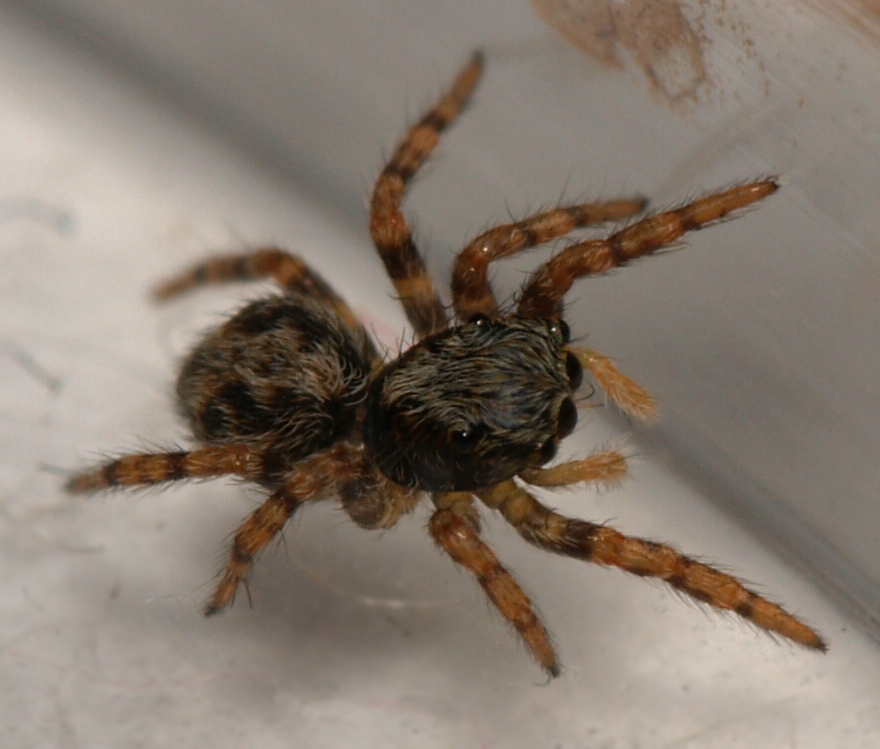
2 mm long juvenile female

== Distribution ==
P. lanigera is distributed in western and southern Europe, eastward to the Caucasus. In Germany this species is most often observed inside houses, or on the external walls of buildings, indicating it is synanthropic at least in some parts of its range.

A first find in Romania was published in 2007, and in Poland the first find was in 1999.

Originally this species was distributed in Southwest Europe, and was first found in Germany in the 1950s, where it is now found only in or near human dwellings.

== Biology ==
P. lanigera has been observed feeding on booklice such as Liposcelis.

== Name ==
The species name (lanigera) means wool-bearing; the genus name 'looking like' (pseud) 'good' (eu) 'eyebrows' (ophrys).

Euophrys ('beautiful eyebrows') is another genus from which Pseudeuophrys has been split off.
