= Liposcelis deltachi =

Scientific classification
- Domain: Eukaryota
- Kingdom: Animalia
- Phylum: Arthropoda
- Class: Insecta
- Order: Psocodea
- Family: Liposcelididae
- Genus: Liposcelis
- Species: L. deltachi

Binomial name
- Liposcelis deltachi Sommerman, 1957

Species of booklouse

Liposcelis deltachi is a species of booklouse in the family Liposcelididae. It is found in Central America and North America.
