= Liposcelis hirsutoides =

Scientific classification
- Domain: Eukaryota
- Kingdom: Animalia
- Phylum: Arthropoda
- Class: Insecta
- Order: Psocodea
- Family: Liposcelididae
- Genus: Liposcelis
- Species: L. hirsutoides

Binomial name
- Liposcelis hirsutoides Mockford, 1978

Species of booklouse

Liposcelis hirsutoides is a species of booklouse in the family Liposcelididae. It is found in Central America, North America, and South America.
