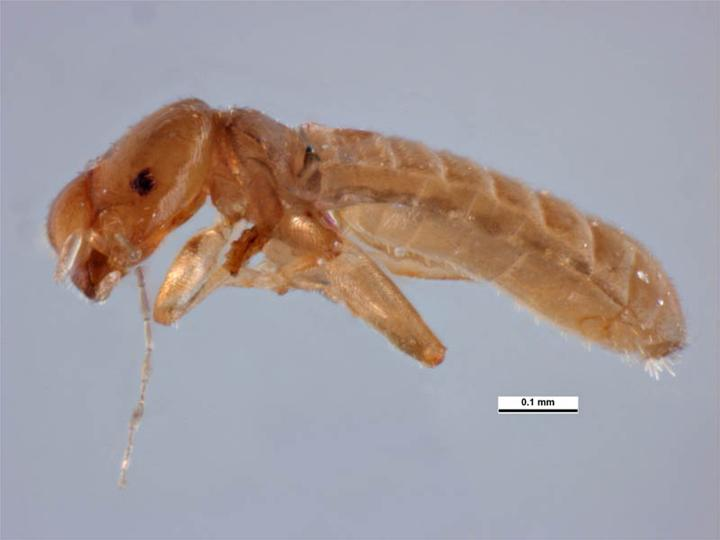

Scientific classification
- Kingdom: Animalia
- Phylum: Arthropoda
- Clade: Pancrustacea
- Class: Insecta
- Order: Psocodea
- Family: Liposcelididae
- Genus: Liposcelis
- Species: L. bostrychophila

Binomial name
- Liposcelis bostrychophila Badonnel, 1931

= Liposcelis bostrychophila =

Species of booklouse

Liposcelis bostrychophila is a species of booklouse in the family Liposcelididae. It is known nearly worldwide as a common pest of stored products. It is especially prevalent in cereals. In 2019 it was identified as a predator of mosquito eggs in a FAO/IAEA Insect Pest Control Laboratory which developed sterile males.

This insect is about 1 millimetre (0.039 in) long, brown in color, and wingless. Females of this species often undergo parthenogenesis and populations consist almost entirely of females. A male specimen was not noted until 2002 and a few years later, another sexually-reproducing strain was found.

== Description ==
Liposcelis bostrychophila is a tiny, pale brown, wingless insect about 1 mm (0.04 in) in length. Like other liposcelids it has short antennae with 15 segments, reduced eyes, and a flattened body with a relatively long abdomen. The femur of the hind leg is wide and flattened, the tarsi have three segments and the coxae are widely separated from each other.

== Distribution ==
Liposcelis bostrychophila has a world-wide distribution, being found in grain stores, warehouses, factories and households, wherever dry foodstuffs are processed or stored.

== Reproduction and development ==
In most populations of Liposcelis bostrychophila, only females are present and reproduction is by parthenogenesis. During her lifetime, the female produces about 200 eggs. These hatch into nymphs which resemble the adult form and pass through four moults before maturing at about 40 days. In 2002, a sexually reproducing strain of L. bostrychophila with both sexes was found in Hawaii, and in 2009, another was found in Arizona. In both of these, reproduction was by sexual means and parthenogenesis did not occur. An endosymbiotic bacterium, Rickettsia sp., is present in all the asexually-reproducing individuals tested, but is absent from the sexually-reproducing strains; this suggests the possibility that the Rickettsia actually causes parthenogenesis, although this remains to be demonstrated. Rickettsia has been implicated in this way in the case of two parthenogenetically-reproducing eulophid wasps.

L. bostrychophila can pause its development by entering diapause, and can survive for up to two months without food.

== Pest status ==
Historically, Liposcelis bostrychophila has been considered a minor pest of stored commodities, perhaps because the small size of the insect made them seem insignificant in comparison with more noticeable pests such as the rice weevil (Sitophilus oryzae), the maize weevil (Sitophilus zeamais), and the lesser grain borer (Rhyzopertha dominica). More recently they have emerged as one of the most important stored good pests because of their prolificacy and resistance to chemical control. Traditional pesticides are problematic for use in foodstuffs because of their expense, the toxic residues they may leave, the safety of workers, and the development of resistance by the pests.

It was identified in 2019 as the predator responsible for damaging stored eggs in a mosquito-rearing facility.

== Genome ==
Liposcelis bostrychophila is almost entirely of a biotype which is parthenogenetic and carries Rickettsia felis. The rare exceptions are both sexual and free of R. felis. It was assumed that this is not a coincidence. Gillespie et al. find that the R. felis plasmids pLbAR_38 and pLbAR_36 are similar to the toxins of toxin-antitoxin modules used by parasitic strains of Wolbachia to maintain reproductive parasitism. Gillespie et al., 2018 confirms that these plasmids do contain such a toxin-antitoxin module. They also use this genetic sequence to find a large number of similar sequences used by other bacteria including other reproductive parasites.
