= Embidopsocus laticeps =

Scientific classification
- Domain: Eukaryota
- Kingdom: Animalia
- Phylum: Arthropoda
- Class: Insecta
- Order: Psocodea
- Family: Liposcelididae
- Genus: Embidopsocus
- Species: E. laticeps

Binomial name
- Embidopsocus laticeps Mockford, 1963

Species of booklouse

Embidopsocus laticeps is a species of booklouse in the family Liposcelididae. It is found in the Caribbean Sea, Central America, and North America.
