= Liposcelis decolor =

Scientific classification
- Domain: Eukaryota
- Kingdom: Animalia
- Phylum: Arthropoda
- Class: Insecta
- Order: Psocodea
- Family: Liposcelididae
- Genus: Liposcelis
- Species: L. decolor

Binomial name
- Liposcelis decolor (Pearman, 1925)

Species of booklouse

Liposcelis decolor is a species of booklouse in the family Liposcelididae. It is found in Africa, Australia, Europe and Northern Asia (excluding China), North America, South America, and Southern Asia.
