= Embidopsocus =

Scientific classification
- Domain: Eukaryota
- Kingdom: Animalia
- Phylum: Arthropoda
- Class: Insecta
- Order: Psocodea
- Family: Liposcelididae
- Subfamily: Embidopsocinae
- Genus: Embidopsocus; Hagen, 1866

Genus of booklice

Embidopsocus is a genus of booklice in the family Liposcelididae. There are more than 40 described species in Embidopsocus.

== Species ==
These 44 species belong to the genus Embidopsocus:

- Embidopsocus angolensis Badonnel, 1955
- Embidopsocus antennalis Badonnel, 1949
- Embidopsocus bousemani Mockford, 1987
- Embidopsocus brasiliensis Badonnel, 1973
- Embidopsocus citrensis Mockford, 1963
- Embidopsocus congolensis Badonnel, 1948
- Embidopsocus cubanus Mockford, 1987
- Embidopsocus distinctus Badonnel, 1955
- Embidopsocus echinus Badonnel, 1955
- Embidopsocus enderleini (Ribaga, 1905)
- Embidopsocus femoralis (Badonnel, 1931)
- Embidopsocus flexuosus Badonnel, 1962
- Embidopsocus frater Badonnel, 1973
- Embidopsocus granulosus Badonnel, 1949
- Embidopsocus hainanicus Li, 2002
- Embidopsocus intermedius Badonnel, 1969
- Embidopsocus jikuni Li, 2002
- Embidopsocus kumaonensis Badonnel, 1981
- Embidopsocus laticeps Mockford, 1963
- Embidopsocus lenah Schmidt & New, 2008
- Embidopsocus leucomelas (Enderlein, 1910)
- Embidopsocus luteus Hagen, 1866
- Embidopsocus machadoi Badonnel, 1955
- Embidopsocus mendax Badonnel, 1973
- Embidopsocus mexicanus Mockford, 1987
- Embidopsocus minor (Pearman, 1931)
- Embidopsocus needhami (Enderlein, 1903)
- Embidopsocus oleaginus (Hagen, 1865)
- Embidopsocus pallidus Badonnel, 1955
- Embidopsocus paradoxus (Enderlein, 1904)
- Embidopsocus pauliani Badonnel, 1955
- Embidopsocus pilosus Badonnel, 1973
- Embidopsocus porphyreus Li, 2002
- Embidopsocus sacchari Mockford, 1996
- Embidopsocus similis Badonnel, 1973
- Embidopsocus thorntoni Badonnel, 1971
- Embidopsocus trichurensis Menon, 1942
- Embidopsocus trifasciatus Badonnel, 1973
- Embidopsocus vilhenai Badonnel, 1955
- Embidopsocus virgatus (Enderlein, 1904)
- Embidopsocus zhouyaoi Li, 2002
- † Embidopsocus eocenicus Nel, De Ploeg & Azar, 2004
- † Embidopsocus pankowskiorum Engel, 2016
- † Embidopsocus saxonicus Günther, 1989
