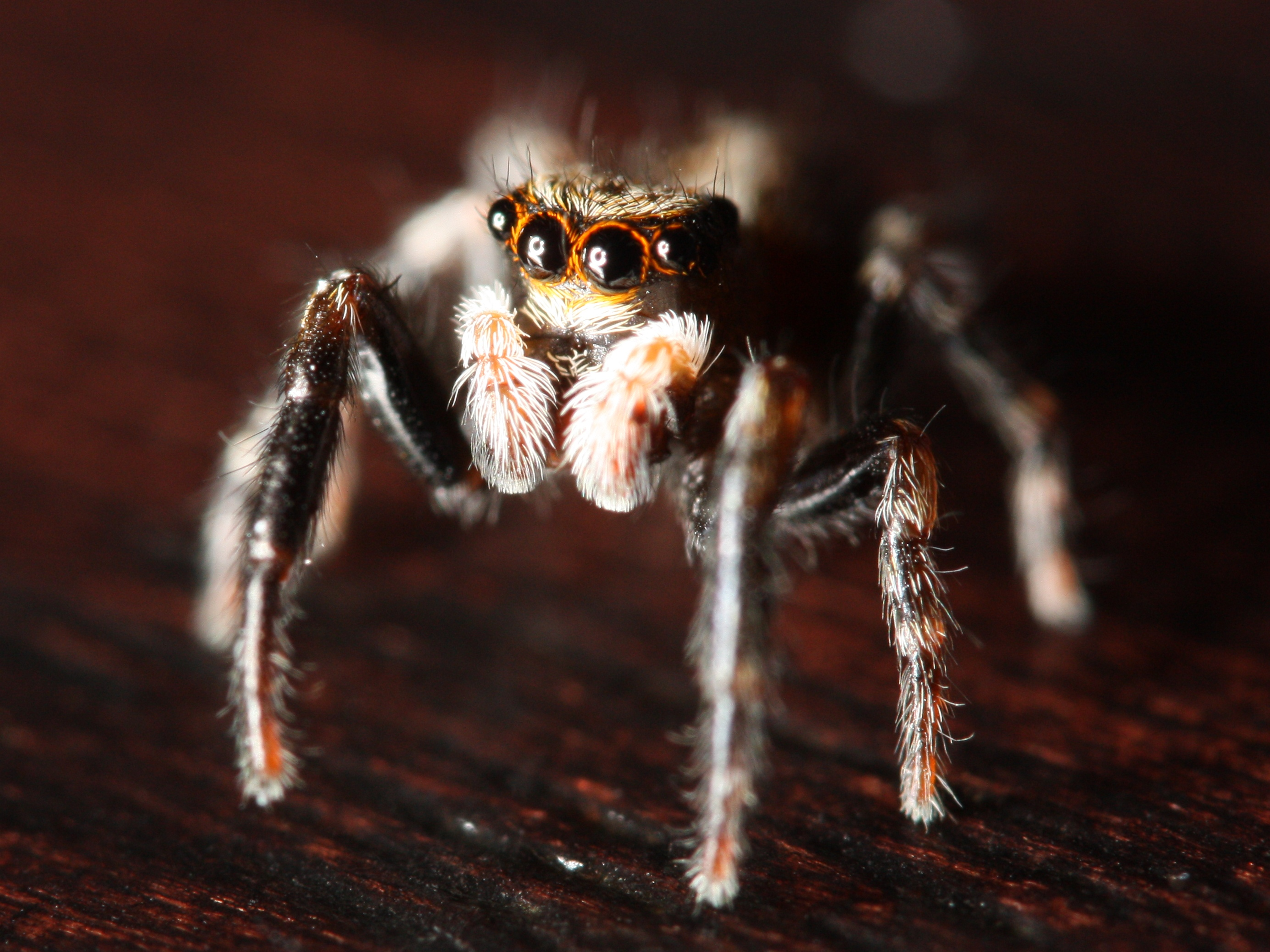
- Pseudophrys lanigera

Scientific classification
- Kingdom: Animalia
- Phylum: Arthropoda
- Subphylum: Chelicerata
- Class: Arachnida
- Order: Araneae
- Infraorder: Araneomorphae
- Family: Salticidae
- Subfamily: Salticinae
- Genus: Pseudeuophrys; Dahl, 1912

Type species
- P. erratica (Walckenaer, 1826)

Species
- 10, see text

= Pseudeuophrys =

Genus of spiders

Pseudeuophrys is a genus of jumping spiders that was first described by Friedrich Dahl in 1912. The name is a combination of the Ancient Greek "pseudo-" (ψευδής), meaning "false", and the salticid genus Euophrys. It was briefly synonymized with Euophrys, but this decision was later reversed.

== Species ==
As of August 2019 it contains ten species, found only in Europe, Asia, and the United States:

- Pseudeuophrys erratica (Walckenaer, 1826) (type) – Europe, Turkey, Caucasus to East Russia, China, Korea, Japon. Introduced to USA
- Pseudeuophrys iwatensis (Bohdanowicz & Prószyński, 1987) – Russia (Far East), China, Korea, Japan
- Pseudeuophrys lanigera (Simon, 1871) – Europe, Turkey, Caucasus. Introduced to USA
- Pseudeuophrys nebrodensis Alicata & Cantarella, 2000 – Spain, Italy (Sicily)
- Pseudeuophrys obsoleta (Simon, 1868) – Europe, Turkey, Caucasus, Russia (Europe to Far East), Central Asia, China
- Pseudeuophrys pascualis (O. Pickard-Cambridge, 1872) – Israel
- Pseudeuophrys perdifumo van Helsdingen, 2015 – Italy
- Pseudeuophrys rhodiensis Schäfer, 2018 – Greece (Rhodes)
- Pseudeuophrys talassica (Logunov, 1997) – Kyrgyzstan
- Pseudeuophrys vafra (Blackwall, 1867) – Azores, Madeira, Europe (Portugal to Russia)
