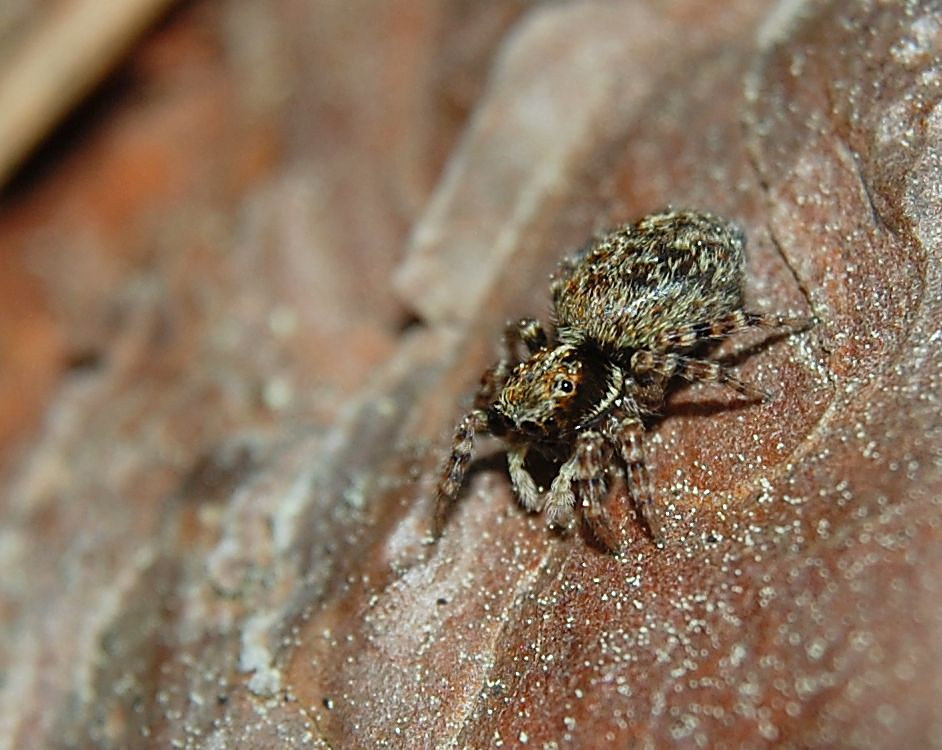
- Female
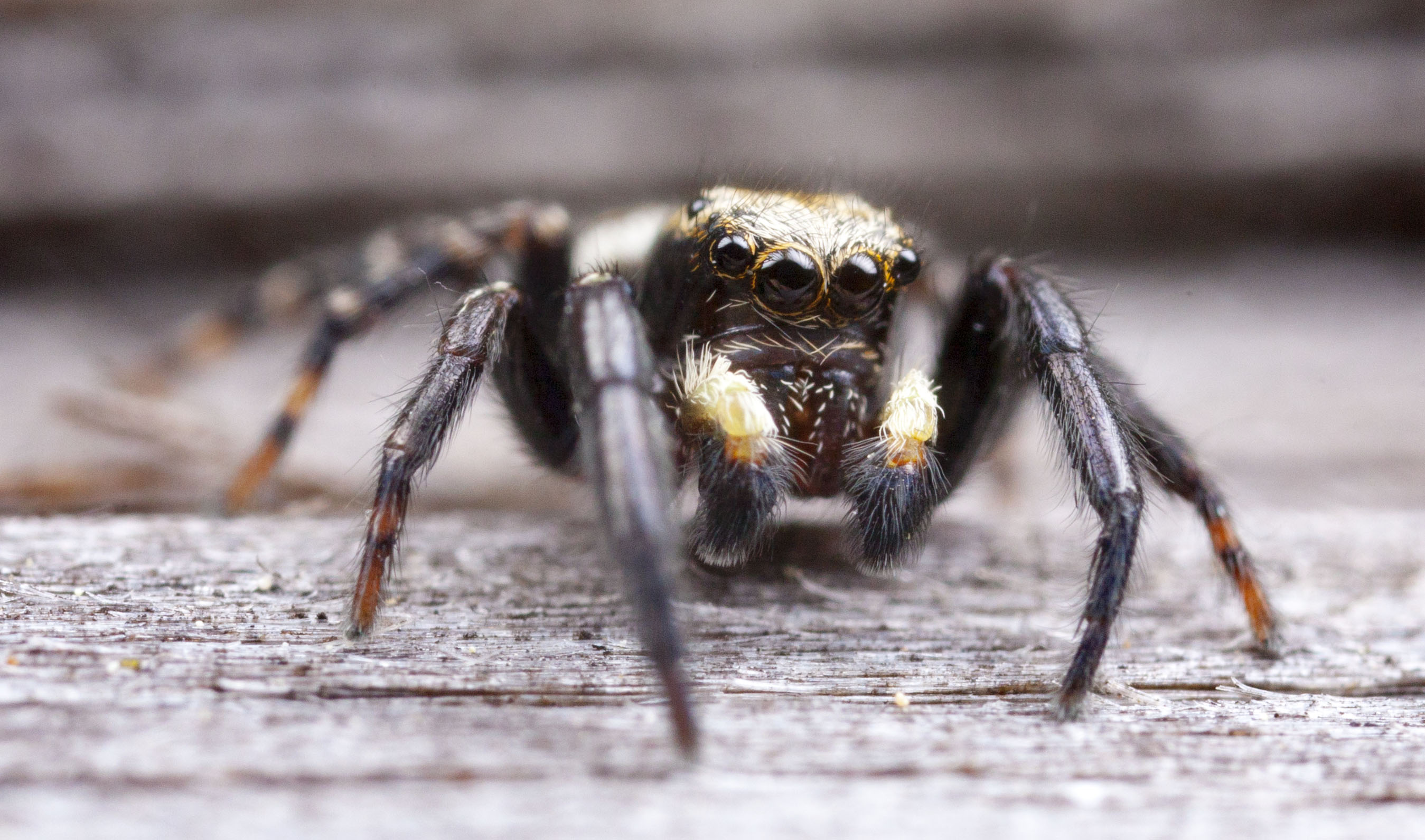
- Male

Scientific classification
- Kingdom: Animalia
- Phylum: Arthropoda
- Subphylum: Chelicerata
- Class: Arachnida
- Order: Araneae
- Infraorder: Araneomorphae
- Family: Salticidae
- Genus: Pseudeuophrys
- Species: P. erratica

Binomial name
- Pseudeuophrys erratica (Walckenaer, 1826)

Synonyms
- Attus erraticus Walckenaer, 1826; Salticus agilis Hahn, 1832; Salticus gracilis Hahn, 1832; Attus tigrinus Walckenaer, 1837; Attus gracilis (Hahn, 1832); Euophrys tigrina (Walckenaer, 1837); Salticus distinctus Blackwall, 1841; Ino tigrina (Walckenaer, 1837); Ino gracilis (Hahn, 1832); Euophrys gracilis (Hahn, 1832); Euophrys agilis (Hahn, 1832); Euophrys callida Simon, 1864; Attus affaber Simon, 1871; Euophrys erratica (Walckenaer, 1826); Euophrys misera Simon, 1876; Pseudeuophrys callida (Simon, 1864)

= Pseudeuophrys erratica =

Species of spider

Pseudeuophrys erratica is a species of jumping spider (family Salticidae) that is distributed throughout Europe, although it is not common. It is normally found under the bark of trees and under rocks on forest fringes. The very similar-looking P. lanigera is much more abundant, and is found almost only in or near buildings.

== Description ==
male

female

female

Males reach a body length of three to four millimeters, with females up to five mm. Adults can be found in spring and summer, females also in autumn.

== Distribution ==
P. erratica has a widespread distribution across Europe and Asia, and has been introduced to the United States. In the United States, it has been reported from Connecticut, New Jersey, New York, Massachusetts, Oregon, Pennsylvania, Rhode Island, and Vermont.
