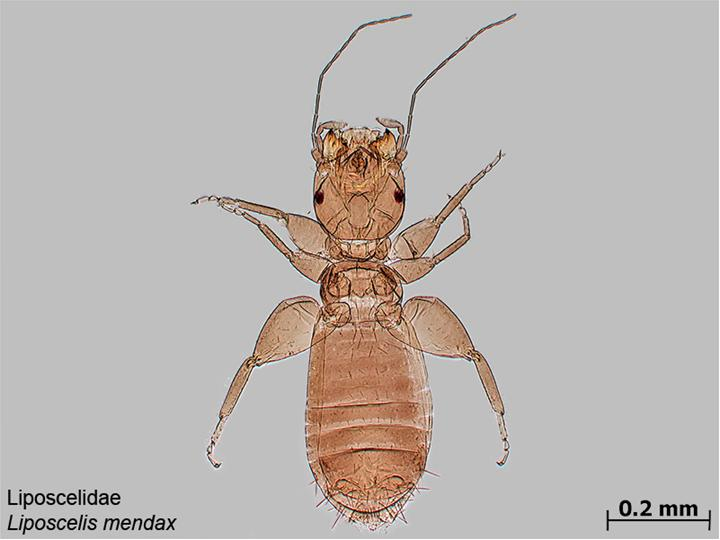
- Liposcelis mendax

Scientific classification
- Kingdom: Animalia
- Phylum: Arthropoda
- Clade: Pancrustacea
- Class: Insecta
- Order: Psocodea
- Family: Liposcelididae
- Subfamily: Liposcelidinae
- Genus: Liposcelis; Motschulsky, 1852

Species
- see text

= Liposcelis =

Genus of booklice

Liposcelis is a genus of insects in the order Psocodea, the, domestic booklice, booklice and barklice. There are about 126 species. Many species are associated with human habitation and several are well known as pests of stored products. The genus is distributed nearly worldwide.

These booklice attack grain stores, particularly if grain is slightly damp or moldy. They are unable to survive long term in locations where relative humidity is below 60% because their body eventually dries out. They are omnivorous and will eat almost any stored product of animal or plant origin, and moulds. Liposcelis spp. are also important pests of museums, libraries, food processing plants, retail and domestic premises. In buildings, psocid infestations are usually associated with dampness and poor ventilation. They can be very numerous in stored grain where they feed on the germ of damaged and broken kernels. The source of the grain damage is harvesting and handling. The damaged area will provide psocids access into the kernel, where they can excavate the soft endosperm to access the germ. Psocids reduce grain weight and quality, invade packaged foodstuffs, and infest storage facilities. Even when they do little damage, their mere presence in a shipment of food makes the product unacceptable to buyers. Their importance as pests has grown in recent years due to greater recognition of their presence in stored products and the lack of control options.

These insects are closely related to lice (order Phthiraptera), the common parasites of animals. At least one species, L. bostrychophila, harbors the human and feline pathogen Rickettsia felis.

Species include:

- Liposcelis bicolor
- Liposcelis bostrychophila
- Liposcelis brunnea
- Liposcelis corrodens
- Liposcelis decolor
- Liposcelis deltachi
- Liposcelis divinatoria
- Liposcelis entomophila
- Liposcelis formicaria
- Liposcelis fusciceps
- Liposcelis hirsutoides
- Liposcelis lacinia
- Liposcelis mendax
- Liposcelis nasus
- Liposcelis nigra
- Liposcelis ornata
- Liposcelis paeta
- Liposcelis pallens
- Liposcelis pallida
- Liposcelis pearmani
- Liposcelis prenolepidis
- Liposcelis rufa
- Liposcelis silvarum
- Liposcelis triocellata
- Liposcelis villosa
