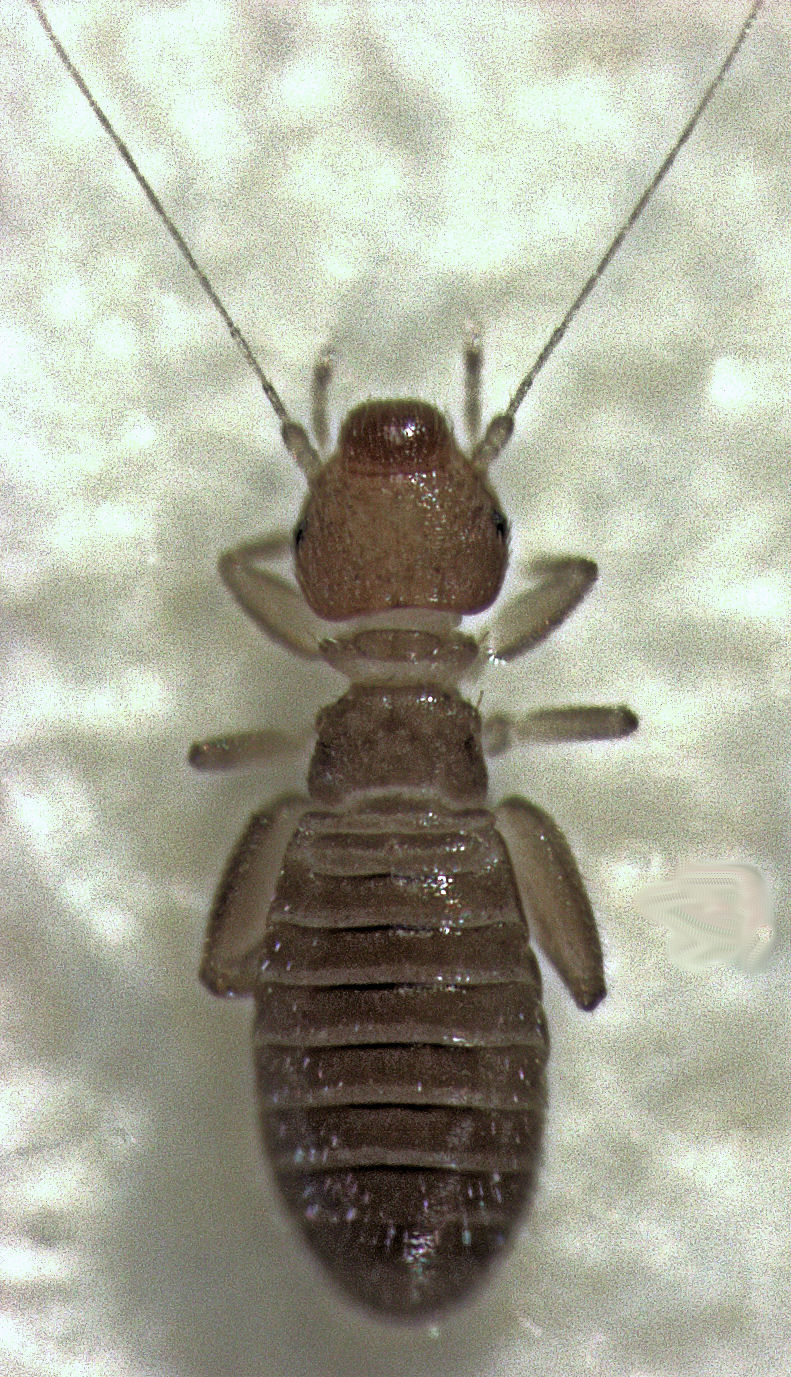
- Liposcelis sp.

Scientific classification
- Kingdom: Animalia
- Phylum: Arthropoda
- Clade: Pancrustacea
- Class: Insecta
- Order: Psocodea
- Suborder: Troctomorpha
- Infraorder: Nanopsocetae
- Family: Liposcelididae

Subfamilies
- Embidopsocinae; Liposcelidinae

= Liposcelididae =

Liposcelididae Temporal range: Cenomanian–Present

Family of booklice

Liposcelididae (historically often referred to as "Liposcelidae") is a family of booklice of the order Psocodea (formerly Psocoptera), belonging to the suborder Troctomorpha. Members of this family are small and flattened, and often wingless. Mesothorax and metathorax fused in wingless forms.

The family contains close to 200 species, arranged in nine genera which make up one smaller and one larger subfamily:

Subfamily Embidopsocinae

- Belapha
- Belaphopsocus
- Belaphotroctes
- Chaetotroctes
- Embidopsocopsis
- Embidopsocus
- Troctulus

Subfamily Liposcelidinae

- Liposcelis
- Troglotroctes

†Cretoscelis Grimaldi and Engel 2006 Burmese amber, Myanmar, Cenomanian
