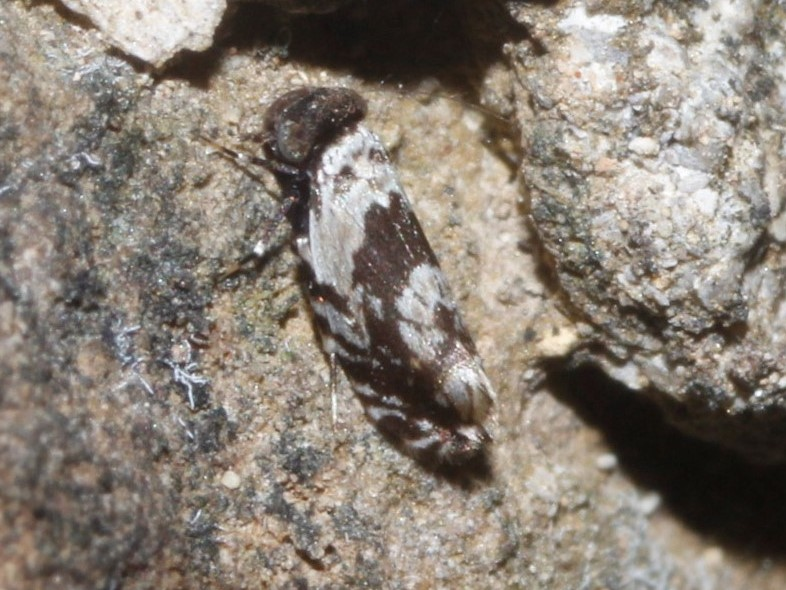
- Lithoseopsis hellmani

Scientific classification
- Domain: Eukaryota
- Kingdom: Animalia
- Phylum: Arthropoda
- Class: Insecta
- Order: Psocodea
- Family: Amphientomidae
- Genus: Lithoseopsis; Mockford, 1993

= Lithoseopsis =

Genus of booklice

Lithoseopsis is a genus of tropical barklice in the family Amphientomidae. There are about 10 described species in Lithoseopsis.

== Species ==
These 10 species belong to the genus Lithoseopsis:

- Lithoseopsis brasiliensis Garcia Aldrete, Da Silva-Neto & Lopes Ferreira, 2018
- Lithoseopsis cervantesi Garcia Aldrete, 2003
- Lithoseopsis chamelensis Garcia Aldrete, 2003
- Lithoseopsis hellmani (Mockford & Gurney, 1956)
- Lithoseopsis humphreysi (New, 1994)
- Lithoseopsis hystrix (Mockford, 1974)
- Lithoseopsis incisa (Smithers, 1989)
- Lithoseopsis insularis Garcia Aldrete, 2003
- Lithoseopsis tuitensis Garcia Aldrete, 2003
- † Lithoseopsis elongata (Mockford, 1969)
