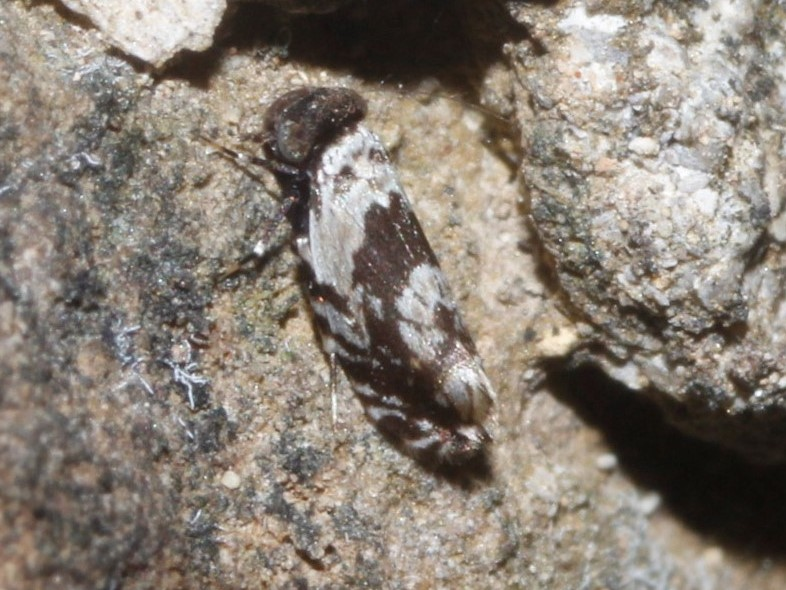

Scientific classification
- Domain: Eukaryota
- Kingdom: Animalia
- Phylum: Arthropoda
- Class: Insecta
- Order: Psocodea
- Family: Amphientomidae
- Genus: Lithoseopsis
- Species: L. hellmani

Binomial name
- Lithoseopsis hellmani (Mockford & Gurney, 1956)

= Lithoseopsis hellmani =

Species of booklouse

Lithoseopsis hellmani is a species of tropical barklouse in the family Amphientomidae. It is found in Central America and North America.
