= Conservation biology of parasites =

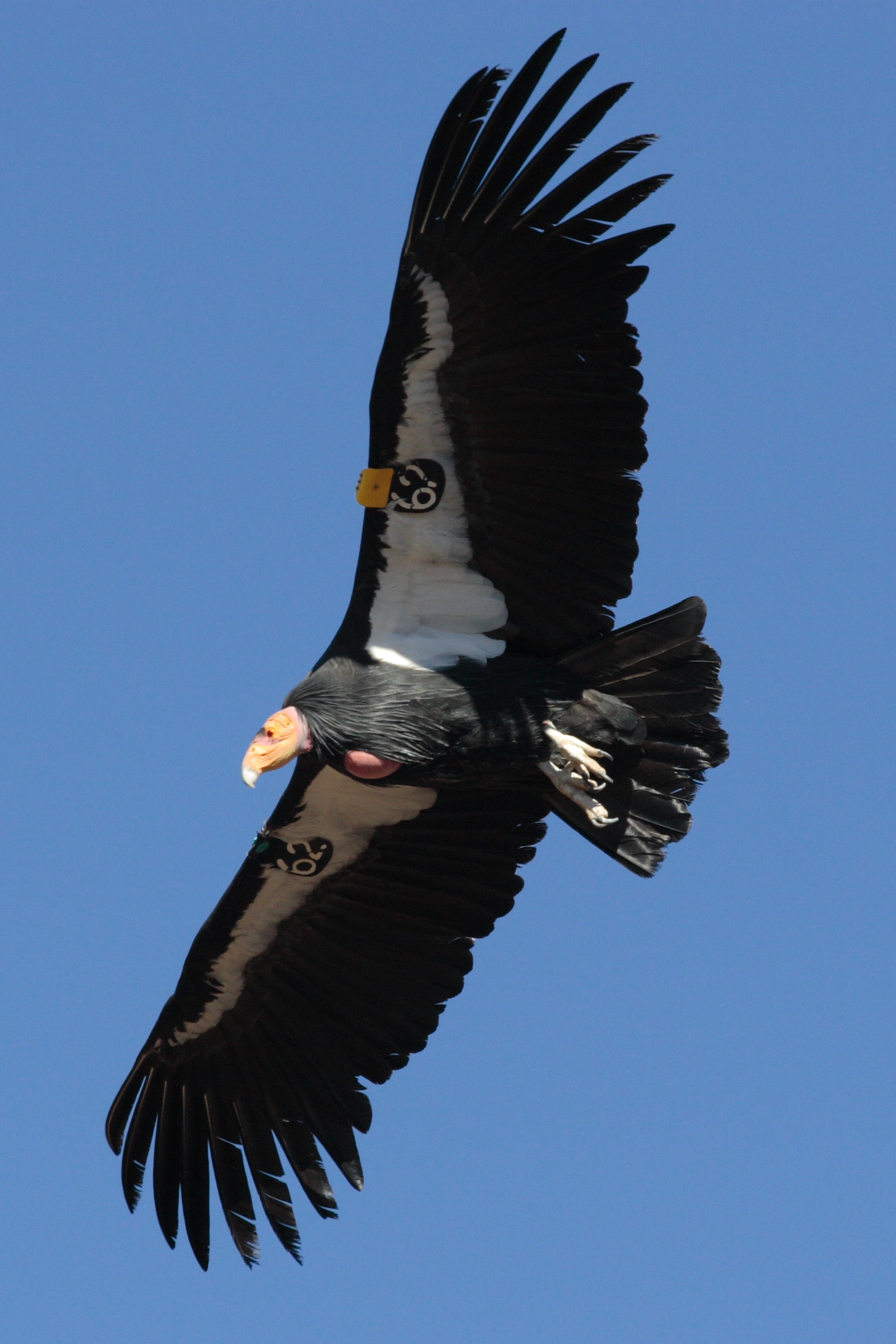
The capture, captive breeding, and reintroduction of California condors into the wild was the most expensive species conservation project in United States history. The bird was saved from extinction but its ectoparasite, the louse Colpocephalum californici, became extinct.

A large proportion of living species on Earth live a parasitic way of life. Parasites have traditionally been seen as targets of eradication efforts, and they have often been overlooked in conservation efforts. In the case of parasites living in the wild – and thus harmless to humans and domesticated animals – this view is changing. The conservation biology of parasites is an emerging and interdisciplinary field that recognizes the integral role parasites play in ecosystems. Parasites are intricately woven into the fabric of ecological communities, with diverse species occupying a range of ecological niches and displaying complex relationships with their hosts.

The rationale for parasite conservation extends beyond their intrinsic value and ecological roles. Parasites offer potential benefits to human health and well-being. Many parasites produce bioactive compounds with pharmaceutical properties, which can be utilized in drug discovery and development. Understanding and conserving parasite biodiversity not only contributes to the preservation of ecosystems but also holds promise for medical advancements and novel therapeutic interventions.

== Parasite role in ecosystems ==
Ranging from microscopic pathogens to larger organisms such as worms and arthropods, parasites exhibit remarkable diversity in their life cycles, transmission strategies, and host relationships. They can be found in virtually every ecosystem on Earth, including terrestrial, freshwater, and marine environments. Parasites often rely on one or multiple host species to complete their life cycle, and their presence can have profound effects on host populations, communities, and even entire ecosystems. One of the fundamental aspects of parasite ecology is their role as a trophic level within the food web. Parasites can occupy various positions within the trophic hierarchy, acting as predators, consumers, or even decomposers. They regulate host populations by influencing host behavior, growth, and reproduction. Furthermore, parasites can indirectly shape community dynamics by mediating interactions between host species and influencing the distribution and abundance of other organisms within the ecosystem.

Despite their ecological significance, parasites have historically received less attention in conservation efforts compared to other groups of organisms. However, in recent years, there has been a growing recognition of the importance of parasite conservation. Ecologists and conservation biologists have emphasized the need for research to understand the ecological roles of parasites, as well as the threats they face and the potential consequences of their decline or extinction. In order for us to accurately understand the impact that parasites have ecologically, being able to identify distinct species is crucial. There is a shortage of experienced parasite taxonomists, which makes it difficult to properly identify parasite species in ecosytems, as well as successfully estimate their numbers in populations. Integrating parasite conservation into broader conservation frameworks is crucial for maintaining the integrity and functionality of ecosystems.

== Conservation approaches ==
Conservation approaches for animal parasites encompass a range of strategies tailored to their unique characteristics and conservation requirements. Assessing the conservation status of parasites poses challenges, as traditional criteria such as those developed by the IUCN may not adequately capture the specific threats and vulnerabilities of these organisms. Efforts often focus on conserving host species, recognizing that protecting the host also benefits associated parasites. This includes habitat conservation, management of host populations, and minimizing anthropogenic impacts.

Nuances arise in parasite conservation when considering translocating species or implementing captive breeding programs. It is essential to consider the potential effects on parasite populations and ensure that appropriate measures are in place to safeguard their survival. In situ conservation, which involves the preservation and management of parasites within their natural habitats, is a key approach. Additionally, ex situ conservation methods, such as maintaining parasite populations in controlled environments, can serve as a safety net for critically endangered species.

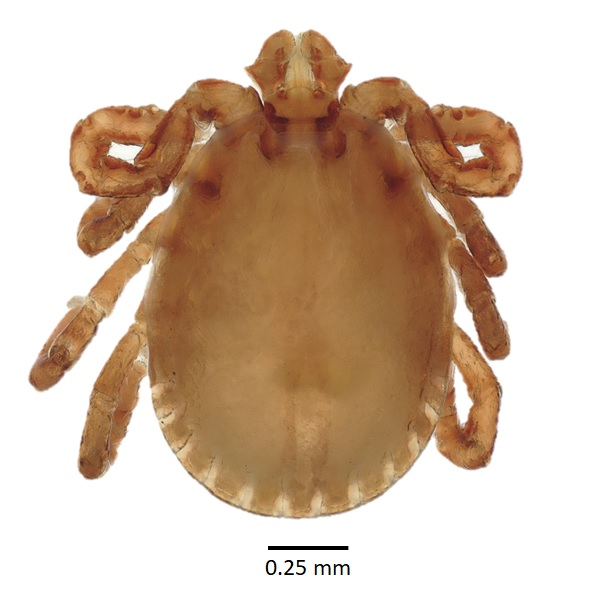
Ryukyu rabbit tick

The world's first conservation program for a globally threatened parasite was launched in 2022 to save the Ryukyu rabbit tick (Haemaphysalis pentalagi). This program involves both in-situ monitoring and recovery efforts for wild populations as well as ex-situ captive breeding of an insurance population. The program is supported by the Ministry of the Environment (Japan), Hokkaido University, Mohamed Bin Zayed Species Conservation Fund, and the IUCN SSC parasite specialist group.

== Endangered parasite species ==
A note published in 1990 pointed out that the captive breeding and reintroduction program to save the black-footed ferret would cause the loss of its specific parasites and demanded "equal rights for parasites". A paper in 1992 warned that not only the loss of certain host species from the wild, but host population bottlenecks or the fragmentation of host populations would predictably lead to the extinction of host-specific parasites. The paper also noted that parasites exert selective pressures upon their host populations that increase host genetic diversity. At first, this view met with open skepticism. However, it became clear that the co-extinction of hosts and their specific parasites is likely to increase the current estimates of extinction rates significantly. A decade later, a study focusing on highly host-specific groups such as fig wasps, parasites, butterflies, and myrmecophil butterflies estimated the number of parasites put at risk by the endangered status of the host at about 6300. Other authors argued that host-specific parasite faunae have an unexpected advantage for conservation scientists. Their genealogies and population genetic patterns may help to illuminate their hosts' evolutionary and demographic history. Recently, scientists suggested that rich parasite faunae are inevitably needed for healthy ecosystem functioning and also that parasites and mutualists are the most endangered species on Earth. Even vets have started to argue about the conservational values of parasite species. A recent study on parasites of coral reef fish suggested that extinction of a coral reef fish species would eventually result in the coextinction of at least ten species of parasites. Although this number might seem high, the study included only large parasites such as parasitic worms and crustaceans, but not microparasites such as Myxosporea and Microsporidia.

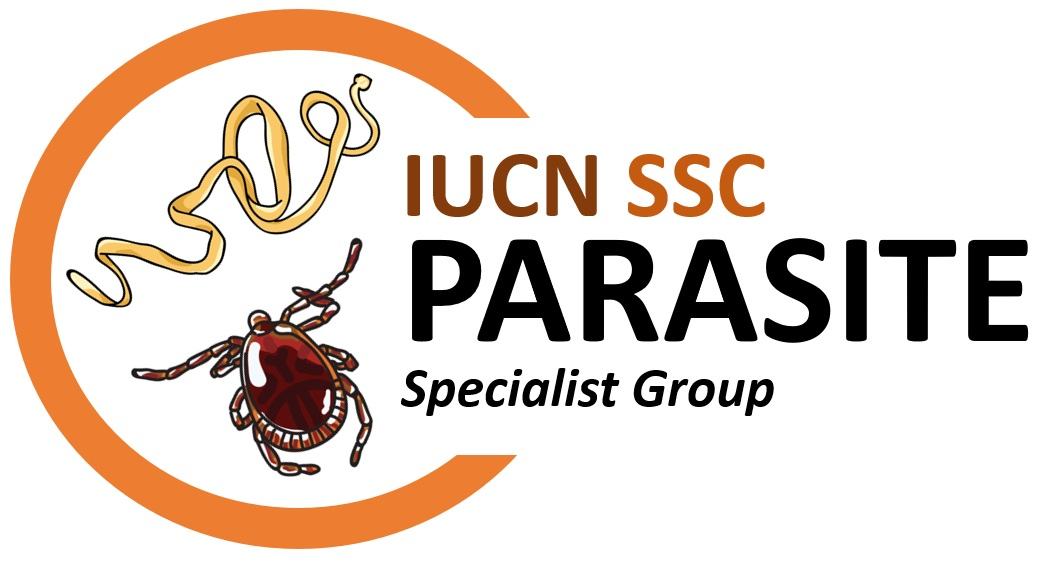
IUCN SSC parasite specialist group logo

In 2023, the IUCN established the parasite specialist group to lead global efforts to assess and conserve threatened parasite species. The group is co-chaired by Mackenzie L. Kwak of Hokkaido University (Japan) and Skylar Hopkins of North Carolina State University (USA). The logo of the IUCN parasite specialist group features two endangered parasites, the Ryukyu rabbit tick (Haemaphysalis pentalagi) from Japan, and the Devil's tapeworm (Dasyurotaenia robusta) from Australia. These species were selected to represent the two major groups of parasites: ectoparasites (external) and endoparasites (internal); and to provide representation of species from both the northern hemisphere and southern hemisphere.

== Examples of extinct or endangered parasites ==
- Acutifrons caracarensis, parasite of the extinct Guadalupe caracara (Caracara lutosa), Guadalupe Island, Mexico.
- Archaeocroton sphenodoni, parasite of the tuatara (Sphenodon punctatus), New Zealand.
- Coloceras hemiphagae, parasite of the extinct Norfolk Island pigeon (Hemiphaga novaeseelandiae spadicea), Norfolk Island, New Zealand.
- Coloceras restinctus, parasite of the extinct Norfolk Island pigeon (Hemiphaga novaeseelandiae spadicea), Norfolk Island, New Zealand.
- Colpocephalum californici, parasite of the California condor (Gymnogyps californianus), western North America. The host was saved by a captive breeding and repatriation program, but the parasite was driven to extinction, deliberately killed whenever it was found during the program to ensure condor survival.
- Columbicola extinctus, parasite of the extinct passenger pigeon (Ectopistes migratorius), eastern North America. However, recent taxonomic studies show that it is conspecific with the lice living on band-tailed pigeon (Patagioenas fasciata), thus it is not extinct.
- Felicola isidoroi, parasite of the endangered Iberian lynx. Similarly to C. californici, it is thought extinct after conservation efforts deloused captive lynxes.
- Haemaphysalis pentalagi, commonly known as the Ryukyu rabbit tick, is a host-specific ectoparasite of the Amami rabbit (Pentalagus furnessi) from Amamioshima, Japan.
- Halarachne americana, the Caribbean monk seal nasal mite, is extinct alongside its host.
- Longimenopon dominicanum, parasite of the extinct Guadalupe storm petrel (Oceanodroma macrodactyla), Guadalupe Island, Mexico.
- Philopteroides xenicus, parasite of the extinct bushwren (Xenicus longipes), New Zealand.
- Psittacobrosus bechsteini, parasite of the extinct Cuban red macaw (Ara tricolor), Cuba.
- Rallicola piageti, parasite of the possibly extinct New Caledonian rail (Cabalus lafresnayanus), New Caledonia.
- Rallicola extinctus, parasite of the extinct huia (Heteralocha acutirostris), New Zealand.

Some species in the list above are taken from Mey (2005)

== See also ==
- Conservation-induced extinction
