= Ernst Mayr =

German-American evolutionary biologist (1904–2005)

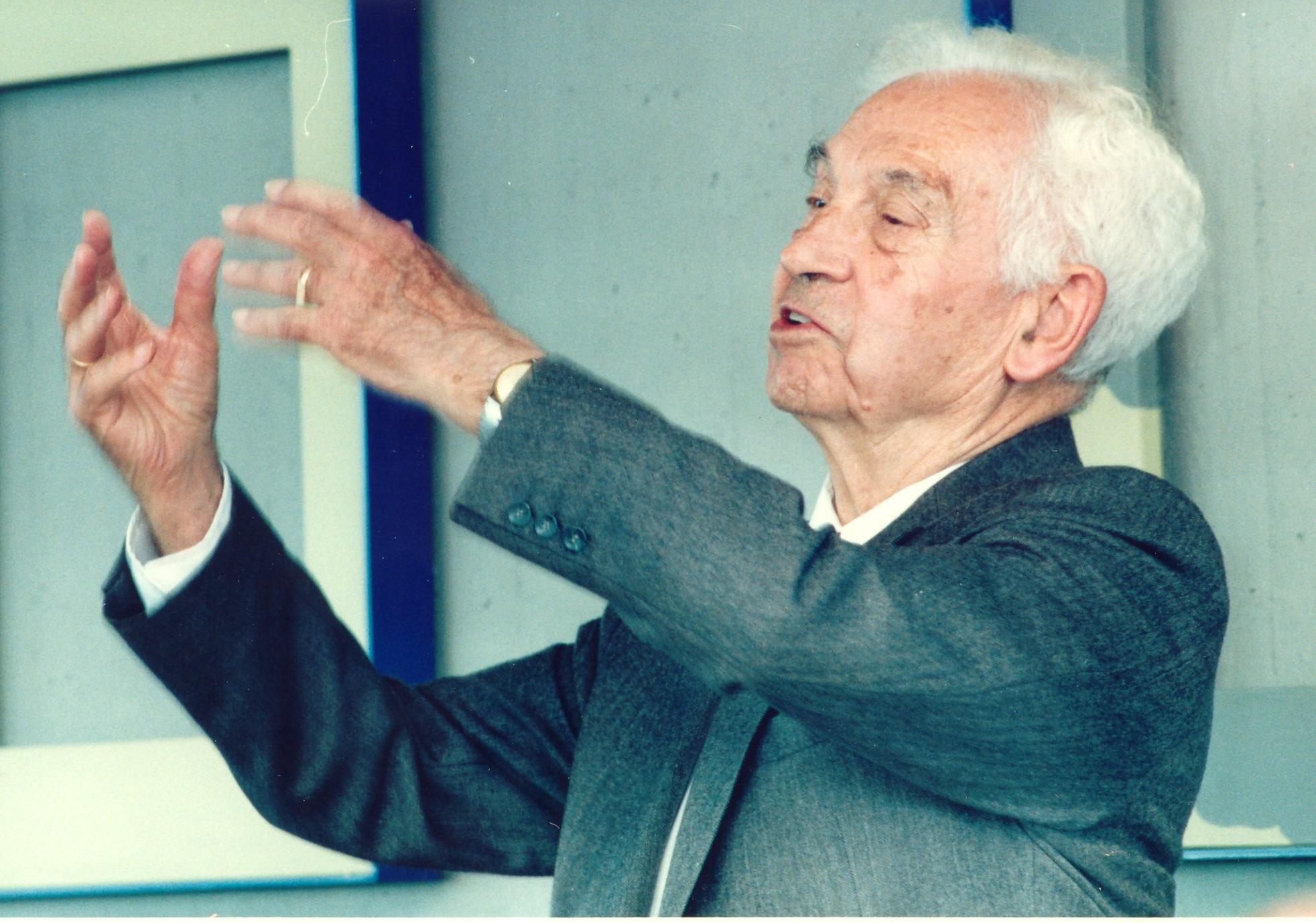
- Mayr in 1994
- Born: Ernst Walter Mayr; 5 July 1904; Kempten, Bavaria, German Empire
- Died: 3 February 2005 (aged 100); Bedford, Massachusetts, U.S.
- Citizenship: Germany; US
- Education: University of Greifswald; Humboldt University of Berlin
- Spouse: Margarete "Gretel" Simon (m. 1935; died 1990)
- Children: 2 daughters
- Parents: Otto Mayr (father); Helene Pusinelli Mayr (mother)
- Awards: Leidy Award (1946); Darwin-Wallace Medal (Silver, 1958); Daniel Giraud Elliot Medal (1967); National Medal of Science (1969); Linnean Medal (1977); Balzan Prize (1983); Darwin Medal (1984); International Prize for Biology (1994); Crafoord Prize (1999)
- Scientific career
- Fields: Systematics; evolutionary biology; ornithology; philosophy of biology

Ernst Walter Mayr (/maɪər/ MYRE; German: [ɛʁnst ˈmaɪɐ]; 5 July 1904 – 3 February 2005) was a German-American evolutionary biologist. He was also a renowned taxonomist, tropical explorer, ornithologist, philosopher of biology, and historian of science. His work contributed to the conceptual revolution that led to the modern evolutionary synthesis of Mendelian genetics, systematics, and Darwinian evolution, and to the development of the biological species concept.

Although Charles Darwin and others posited that multiple species could evolve from a single common ancestor, the mechanism by which this occurred was not understood, creating the species problem. Ernst Mayr approached the problem with a new definition for species. In his book Systematics and the Origin of Species (1942) he wrote that a species is not just a group of morphologically similar individuals, but a group that can breed only among themselves, excluding all others. When populations within a species become isolated by geography, feeding strategy, mate choice, or other means, they may start to differ from other populations through genetic drift and natural selection, and over time may evolve into new species. The most significant and rapid genetic reorganization occurs in extremely small populations that have been isolated (as on islands).

His theory of peripatric speciation (a more precise form of allopatric speciation which he advanced), based on his work on birds, is still considered a leading mode of speciation, and was the theoretical underpinning for the theory of punctuated equilibrium, proposed by Niles Eldredge and Stephen Jay Gould. Mayr is sometimes credited with inventing modern philosophy of biology, particularly the part related to evolutionary biology, which he distinguished from physics due to its introduction of (natural) history into science.

== Biography ==
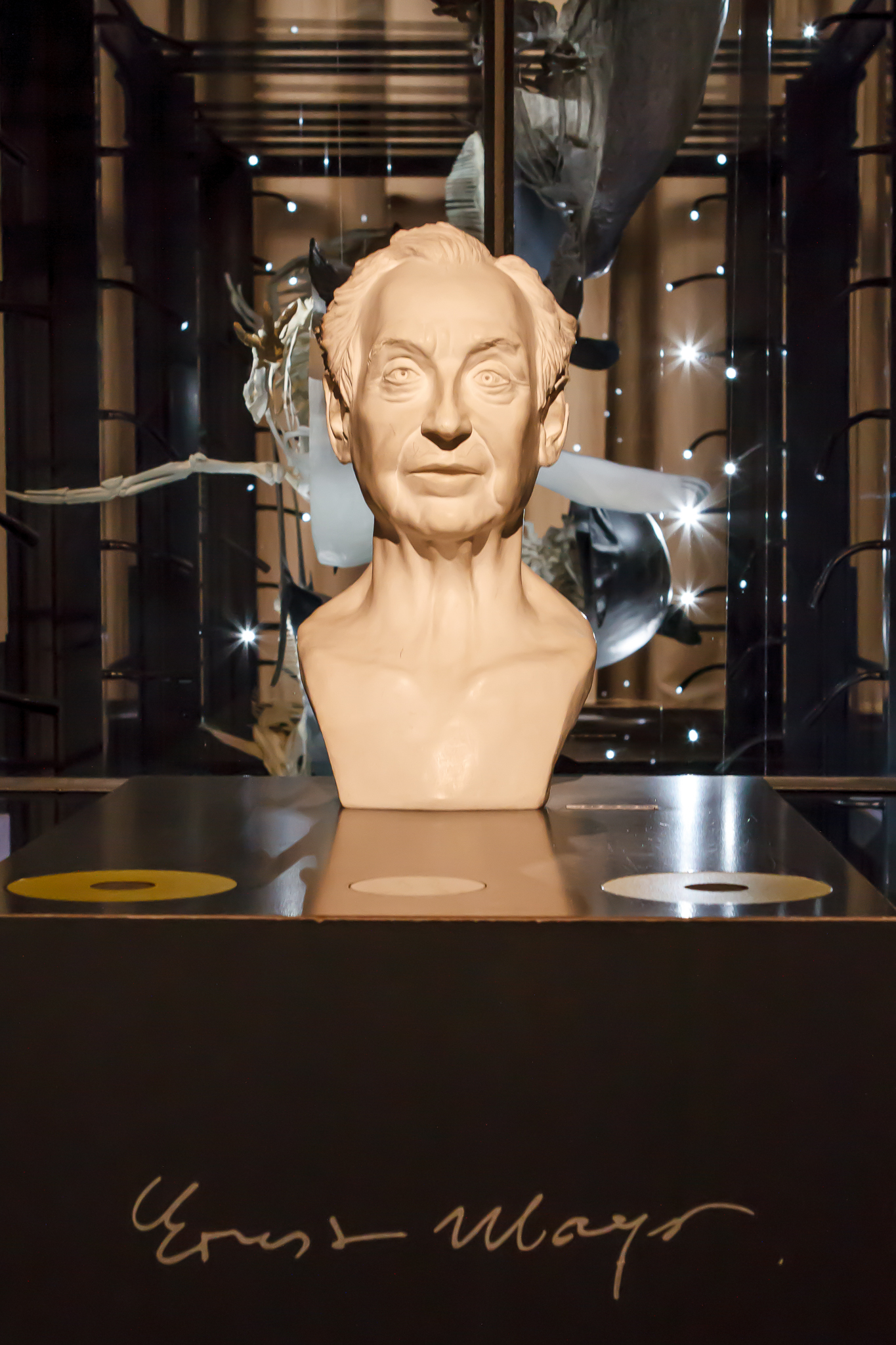
Bust of Mayr in Berlin's Natural History Museum

=== Early life and studies ===
Mayr was the second son of Helene Pusinelli and Otto Mayr. His father was a district prosecuting attorney at Würzburg but took an interest in natural history and took the children out on field trips. Mayr learnt all the local birds in Würzburg from his elder brother Otto. He also had access to a natural history magazine for amateurs, Kosmos. His father died just before he was thirteen. The family then moved to Dresden, where he studied at the Staatsgymnasium in Dresden-Neustadt and completed his high school education. In April 1922, while still in high school, he joined the newly founded Saxony Ornithologists' Association. There he met Rudolf Zimmermann, who became his ornithological mentor. In February 1923, Mayr passed his high school examination (Abitur) and his mother rewarded him with a pair of binoculars.

On 23 March 1923 on one of the lakes of Moritzburg, the Frauenteich, he spotted what he identified as a red-crested pochard. The species had not been seen in Saxony since 1845 and the local club argued about the identity. Raimund Schelcher (1891–1979) of the club then suggested that Mayr visit his classmate Erwin Stresemann on his way to Greifswald, where Mayr was to begin his medical studies. After a tough interrogation, Stresemann accepted and published the sighting as authentic. Stresemann was very impressed and suggested that, between semesters, Mayr could work as a volunteer in the ornithological section of the museum. Mayr wrote about this event, "It was as if someone had given me the key to heaven." He entered the University of Greifswald in 1923 and, according to Mayr himself, "took the medical curriculum (to satisfy a family tradition) but after only a year, he decided to leave medicine and enrolled at the Faculty of Biological Sciences." Mayr was endlessly interested in ornithology and "chose Greifswald at the Baltic for my studies for no other reason than that ... it was situated in the ornithologically most interesting area." Although he planned ostensibly to become a physician, he was "first and foremost an ornithologist." During the first semester break Stresemann gave him a test to identify treecreepers and Mayr was able to identify most of the specimens correctly. Stresemann declared that Mayr "was a born systematist". In 1925, Stresemann suggested that he give up his medical studies, in fact he should leave the faculty of medicine and enrol into the faculty of Biology and then join the Berlin Museum with the prospect of bird-collecting trips to the tropics, on the condition that he completed his doctoral studies in 16 months. Mayr completed his doctorate in ornithology at the University of Berlin under Dr. Carl Zimmer, who was a full professor (Ordentlicher Professor), on 24 June 1926 at the age of 21. On 1 July he accepted the position offered to him at the museum for a monthly salary of 330.54 Reichsmark.

At the International Zoological Congress at Budapest in 1927, Mayr was introduced by Stresemann to banker and naturalist Walter Rothschild, who asked him to undertake an expedition to New Guinea on behalf of himself and the American Museum of Natural History (AMNH) in New York. In New Guinea, Mayr collected several thousand bird skins (he named 38 new bird species during his lifetime) and, in the process also named 38 new orchid species. During his stay in New Guinea, he was invited to accompany the Whitney South Sea Expedition to the Solomon Islands. Also, while in New Guinea, he visited the Lutheran missionaries Otto Thiele and Christian Keyser, in the Finschhafen district; there, while in conversation with his hosts, he uncovered the discrepancies in Hermann Detzner's popular book Four Years among Cannibals: New Guinea, in which Detzner claimed to have seen the interior, discovered several species of flora and fauna, while remaining only steps ahead of the Australian patrols sent to capture him. He returned to Germany in 1930.

=== Move to the United States ===
Mayr moved to the United States in 1931 to take up a curatorial position at the American Museum of Natural History, where he produced numerous publications on bird taxonomy, naming 26 new species and 445 new subspecies of birds. Additionally, Mayr played the important role of brokering and acquiring the Walter Rothschild collection of bird skins, which was being sold in order to pay off a blackmailer.

After Mayr was appointed at the American Museum of Natural History, he influenced American ornithological research by mentoring young birdwatchers, such as those of the Bronx County Bird Club. Mayr was surprised at the differences between American and German birding societies. He noted that the German society was "far more scientific, far more interested in life histories and breeding bird species, as well as in reports on recent literature."

=== Modern Synthesis ===
While in New York, Mayr regularly attended seminars at Columbia University, assimilating the latest findings in biology and incorporating them into his thought. The long defunct Jesup Lectures in Columbia's Department of Zoology started up again in 1936 with Theodosius Dobzhansky presenting findings that would shortly afterwards form the nucleus of his magnum opus, Genetics and the Origin of Species. The Jesup Lectures brought Dobzhansky and Mayr together, an event that would catalyse the climax of the Modern Synthesis of Darwinian evolution and Mendelian heredity.

When Dobzhansky permanently moved from the California Institute of Technology to Columbia in 1940, Mayr and Dobzhansky became close friends, with their consonant personalities enabling efficient exchange of ideas that enhanced both individuals' thinking. In 1942, Mayr published Systematics and the Origin of Species, his first book and a seminal work in the Synthesis. Mayr also partook in the establishment of the Society for the Study of Evolution and its scientific journal Evolution, which served as an academic forum for evolutionary biologists working in the research programme of the Modern Synthesis. Mayr developed a conceptual framework for examining intraspecific variation that he coined "population thinking". He opposed biological typology and essentialism, emphasising that individual variation was the basis on which natural selection could act.

=== At the Linnean Society of New York ===
Mayr organized a monthly seminar under the auspices of the Linnean Society of New York. Under the influence of J.A. Allen, Frank Chapman, and Jonathan Dwight, the society concentrated on taxonomy and later became a clearing house for bird banding and sight records.

Mayr encouraged his Linnean Society seminar participants to take up a specific research project of their own. Under Mayr's influence one of them, Joseph Hickey, went on to write A Guide to Birdwatching (1943). Hickey remembered later, "Mayr was our age and invited on all our field trips. The heckling of this German foreigner was tremendous, but he gave tit for tat, and any modern picture of Dr E. Mayr as a very formal person does not square with my memory of the 1930s. He held his own." A group of eight young birdwatchers from The Bronx later became the Bronx County Bird Club, led by Ludlow Griscom. "Everyone should have a problem" was the way one Bronx County Bird Club member recalled Mayr's refrain. Mayr said of his own involvement with the local birdwatchers: "In those early years in New York when I was a stranger in a big city, it was the companionship and later friendship which I was offered in the Linnean Society that was the most important thing in my life."

=== Later life and influence ===
Mayr also greatly influenced the American ornithologist Margaret Morse Nice. Mayr encouraged her to correspond with European ornithologists and helped her in her landmark study on song sparrows. Nice wrote to Joseph Grinnell in 1932, trying to get foreign literature reviewed in the Condor: "Too many American ornithologists have despised the study of the living bird; the magazines and books that deal with the subject abound in careless statements, anthropomorphic interpretations, repetition of ancient errors, and sweeping conclusions from a pitiful array of facts. ... in Europe the study of the living bird is taken seriously. We could learn a great deal from their writing." Mayr ensured that Nice could publish her two-volume Studies in the Life History of the Song Sparrow. He found her a publisher, and her book was reviewed by Aldo Leopold, Joseph Grinnell, and Jean Delacour. Nice dedicated her book to "My Friend Ernst Mayr."

Mayr joined the faculty of Harvard University in 1953, where he also served as director of the Museum of Comparative Zoology from 1961 to 1970.

The Scientific American magazine engaged Mayr to make a specific ornithological excursion to the islands off the coast of Venezuela in 1961. Hosted by the Phelps family, this trip deeply influenced Mayr's conceptual thinking about geographical bird distributions. Mayr worked closely with the vast specimens housed in the William Phelps Ornithological Collection, which remains one of the most extensive databases of Neotropical birds in South America.

He retired in 1975 as emeritus professor of zoology, showered with honors. Following his retirement, he went on to publish more than 200 articles, in a variety of journals—more than some reputable scientists publish in their entire careers; 14 of his 25 books were published after he was 65. Even as a centenarian, he continued to write books.

On his 100th birthday, he was interviewed by Scientific American magazine.

=== Death and legacy ===
Mayr died on 3 February 2005 in his retirement home in Bedford, Massachusetts, after a short illness. He had married fellow German Margarete "Gretel" Simon in May 1935 (they had met at a party in Manhattan in 1932), and she assisted Mayr in some of his work.

Margarete died in 1990. He was survived by two daughters (Christa Menzel and Susanne Harrison), five grandchildren and 10 great-grandchildren.

The awards that Mayr received include the National Medal of Science, the Balzan Prize, the Sarton Medal of the History of Science Society, the International Prize for Biology, the Loye and Alden Miller Research Award, and the Lewis Thomas Prize for Writing about Science. In 1939 he was elected a Corresponding Member of the Royal Australasian Ornithologists Union. He was awarded the 1946 Leidy Award from the Academy of Natural Sciences of Philadelphia. He was awarded the Linnean Society of London's prestigious Darwin-Wallace Medal in 1958 and the Linnaean Society of New York's inaugural Eisenmann Medal in 1983. For his work, Animal Species and Evolution, he was awarded the Daniel Giraud Elliot Medal from the National Academy of Sciences in 1967. Mayr was elected a Foreign Member of the Royal Society (ForMemRS) in 1988. In 1995 he received the Benjamin Franklin Medal for Distinguished Achievement in the Sciences of the American Philosophical Society, of which he was already a member. In 1995, Harvard University renamed the Library of the Museum of Comparative Zoology the Ernst Mayr Library, in his honor. Mayr never won a Nobel Prize, but he noted that there is no prize for evolutionary biology and that Darwin would not have received one, either. (In fact, there is no Nobel Prize for biology.) Mayr did win a 1999 Crafoord Prize. It honors basic research in fields that do not qualify for Nobel Prizes and is administered by the same organization as the Nobel Prize. In 2001, Mayr received the Golden Plate Award of the American Academy of Achievement. Since winning Balzan Prize, Crafoord Prize and the International Prize for Biology, are usually regarded as a "Triple Crown in Biology," he won this crown too.

Mayr was co-author of six global reviews of bird species new to science (listed below).

Mayr said he was an atheist in regards to "the idea of a personal God" because "there is nothing that supports [it]".

== Ideas ==
=== Beanbag genetics ===
As a traditionally-trained biologist, Mayr was often highly critical of early mathematical approaches to evolution, such as those of J.B.S. Haldane, and famously called such approaches "beanbag genetics" in 1959. He maintained that factors such as reproductive isolation had to be taken into account. In a similar fashion, Mayr was also quite critical of molecular evolution studies such as those of Carl Woese. Current molecular studies in evolution and speciation indicate that although allopatric speciation is the norm, there are numerous cases of sympatric speciation in groups with greater mobility, such as birds. The precise mechanisms of sympatric speciation are usually a form of microallopatry enabled by variations in niche occupancy among individuals within a population.

=== Units of selection ===
In many of his writings, Mayr rejected reductionism in evolutionary biology, arguing that evolutionary pressures act on the whole organism, not on single genes, and that genes can have different effects depending on the other genes present. He advocated a study of the whole genome, rather than of only isolated genes. Mayr insisted that the entire genome should be considered as the target of selection (thus genome evolution) rather than individual genes:

The idea that a few people have about the gene being the target of selection is completely impractical; a gene is never visible to natural selection, and in the genotype, it is always in the context with other genes, and the interaction with those other genes make a particular gene either more favorable or less favorable. In fact, Dobzhansky, for instance, worked quite a bit on so-called lethal chromosomes which are highly successful in one combination, and lethal in another. Therefore people like Dawkins in England who still think the gene is the target of selection are evidently wrong. In the 30s and 40s, it was widely accepted that genes were the target of selection, because that was the only way they could be made accessible to mathematics, but now we know that it is really the whole genotype of the individual, not the gene. Except for that slight revision, the basic Darwinian theory hasn't changed in the last 50 years.

— Ernst Mayr, Edge

Mayr rejected the idea of a gene-centered view of evolution and starkly but politely criticised Richard Dawkins's ideas:

The funny thing is if in England, you ask a man in the street who the greatest living Darwinian is, he will say Richard Dawkins. And indeed, Dawkins has done a marvelous job of popularizing Darwinism. But Dawkins' basic theory of the gene being the object of evolution is totally non-Darwinian. I would not call him the greatest Darwinian.

— Ernst Mayr, Edge

=== Species concepts ===
After articulating the biological species concept in 1942, Mayr played a central role in the species problem debate over what was the best species concept. He staunchly defended the biological species concept against the many definitions of "species" that others proposed.

=== Teleonomy ===
Mayr argued that the seeming goal-directedness of many biological process did not require vitalistic explanations or cosmic teleology invoking backwards causation. He popularised the term teleonomy to refer to programmatic biological processes like organismal growth and development and emphasised that the genetic programmes encoding these processes were heavily selected for and stabilised by natural selection to give the appearance of being goal-directed but required no supernatural explanations.

=== Reductionism ===
Mayr was staunchly anti-reductionist in his philosophy of science. He was an opponent of attempts at reducing biology to physics and chemistry. While agreeing that biological processes were ultimately the result of physical and chemical laws, Mayr argued that evolutionary biology had a historical dimension to it that could never be reduced to the physical sciences, and that reductionism could only be insightful when examining proximate causes of biological phenomena. He believed biological systems had emergent properties whose meaning was entirely lost when trying to reduce and analyse them at more fundamental scales.

=== Scientific method ===
Mayr was an outspoken defender of the scientific method and was known to critique sharply science on the edge. As a notable example, in 1995, he criticized the Search for Extra-Terrestrial Intelligence (SETI), as conducted by fellow Harvard professor Paul Horowitz, as being a waste of university and student resources for its inability to address and answer a scientific question. Over 60 eminent scientists, led by Carl Edward Sagan, rebutted the criticism.

=== Racism ===
Mayr disliked racism, and considered population thinking to render it biologically invalid. He laid the blame for scientific racism at the feet of typological thinking, which he opposed and contrasted with population thinking. Understanding that every individual being unique, Mayr stated that while it was inarguable that biological variation was geographically distributed in such a way that biological races did exist in humans, one's race was not a useful predictor of an individual's attributes. He was a strong proponent of civic equality.

=== Social Darwinism ===
Mayr was a strong critic of Social Darwinism and argued that the ideas of Herbert Spencer were substantially divergent from Darwin's. Mayr believed that it was inaccurate to associate Spencer with Darwinism, pointing out not only that Spencer's theory of evolution preceded Darwin's but that it was based primarily on neo-Lamarckian inheritance and orthogenesis and thus conflicted with Darwin's. For this reason, Mayr preferred the term "Social Spencerism" when referring to Social Darwinism. Mayr argued this incorrect association of Spencer with Darwin was damaging and led to resistance of acceptance of Darwinism in the social sciences, which undermined their credibility.

=== Lysenkoism ===
Mayr was an outspoken critic of Lysenkoism, saying "Lysenkoism is as wrong as is racism", and extended his critique of Lysenkoism to other opposition to scientific findings motivated by ideological leftism. In his book The Growth of Biological Thought, Mayr asserted that much of contemporary hostility to sociobiology was politically motivated and stemmed from the same ideological roots as Lysenkoism.

=== Hominid Classification ===
Before Mayr, Human taxonomy was a confusing an uncertain field, often times every individual fossil found of a hominid with minor differences from previously known specimens would be classified as a unique species. In 1950 Mayr entered the field and found a "bewildering diversity of names", he complained that by the criteria used to designate species of archaic humans was akin to calling modern ethnic groups separate species. Mayr did not believe multiple species of humans existed at the same time on earth and thus created a more conservative taxonomy by consolidating fossil hominids into three groups based on age instead of morphology, Homo. transvaalensis the most archaic, Homo. erectus for the various primitive taxa from across Afro-Eurasia, and Homo. sapiens for all specimens younger then erectus such as modern humans and neanderthals. Mayr later accepted Australopithecus as a replacement of transvaalensis, otherwise Mayr's more conservative taxonomy has been accepted since he proposed it.

== Currently recognised taxa named in his honour ==
- Bismarck black myzomela (Myzomela psammelaena ernstmayri) Meise, 1929 - a subspecies of bird, a honeyeater, family Meliphagidae, confined to several small islands to the west of the Admiralty Islands, in western Oceania, northeast of New Guinea.
- Mayr's forest rail (Rallicula mayri) (Hartert, 1930) - a species of bird found in New Guinea.
- Mayr's honeyeater (Ptiloprora mayri) Hartert, 1930 - a species of bird found in New Guinea.
- Mayr's swiftlet (Aerodramus orientalis) (Mayr, 1935) - a species of bird found in New Ireland and Guadalcanal.
- Ernst Mayr's water rat (Leptomys ernstmayri) Rümmler, 1932 - a species of rodent, of the family Muridae, from the Foja Mountains of Papua Province, Indonesia, and Central Cordillera, Adelbert Range, and Huon Peninsula of Papua New Guinea.
- a roundworm - Poikilolaimus ernstmayri Sudhaus & Koch, 2004 - a new species of nematode, family Rhabditidae, associated with termites of the genus Reticulitermes, in Corsica.
- New Ireland rail (Gallirallus ernstmayri) † (Kirchman & Steadman, 2006) - a relatively large, probably flightless, extinct rail, family Rallidae, known from subfossil remains found on prehistoric archeological sites, in caves on New Ireland, in the Bismarck Archipelago, western Oceania.)
- Star Mountains worm-eating snake (Toxicocalamus ernstmayri) O'Shea, Parker & Kaiser, 2015 - a 1.2 m, rare and secretive, venomous snake from the family Elapidae, believed to feed exclusively of earthworms, particularly the giant earthworms of the Megascolecidae. The etymology reads: The species name ernstmayri is a patronym honoring the German-American ornithologist, systematist, and evolutionary thinker Ernst Mayr (1904–2005). There are several connections linking Ernst Mayr to this new species of Toxicocalamus, which make him, and this snake, the ideal candidates for a patronym. First, Mayr himself visited New Guinea, and during the late 1920s he spent over 2 years conducting fieldwork in an area now part of PNG, as a member of a joint Rothschild–AMNH expedition focusing on birds of paradise (Aves, Passeriformes, Paradisaeidae), during which he collected many new bird and orchid species. Second, the holotype of T. ernstmayri has been housed in the MCZ collection, mislabeled as Micropechis ikaheka, after having arrived and been accessioned in June 1975, the month and year that Mayr retired. Third, the true identity of this specimen was recognized by one of us (MOS) during a visit to the MCZ in May 2014, undertaken with the financial support of an Ernst Mayr Travel Grant from Harvard University, awarded to enable examination of the Toxicocalamus holdings at the MCZ and the AMNH, the two U.S. institutions where Mayr worked. Finally, 2015, the publication year of this description, marks the decennial of Mayr's passing at age 100, and naming a New Guinea snake after him seems a suitable tribute.
- an assassin bug - Bagauda ernstmayri Kulkarni & Ghate, 2016 - a species of cavernicolous, thread-legged assassin bug, known only from Satara, in the Western Ghats of Maharashtra State, India.
- a genus of pseudoscorpions - Ernstmayria Curcic et al., 2006 (Neobisiidae)
- a species of spider - Cebrennus mayri Jäger, 2000
- a species of damselfly - Palaiargia ernstmayri Lieftinck, 1972
- a species of bird lice - Anaticola ernstmayri Eichler, 1954 (Philopteridae)
- a species of earwig - Irdex ernstmayri Günther, 1930

== Summary of Darwin's theory ==
Darwin's theory of evolution is based on key facts and the inferences drawn from them, which Mayr summarised as follows:

- Every species is fertile enough that if all offspring survived to reproduce, the population would grow (fact).
- Despite periodic fluctuations, populations remain roughly the same size (fact).
- Resources such as food are limited and are relatively stable over time (fact).
- Struggle for survival ensues (inference).
- Individuals in a population vary significantly from one another (fact).
- Much of the variation is heritable (fact).
- Individuals less suited to the environment are less likely to survive and less likely to reproduce; individuals more suited to the environment are more likely to survive and more likely to reproduce and leave their heritable traits to future generations, which produces the process of natural selection (fact).
- This slowly effected process results in populations changing to adapt to their environments, and ultimately, these variations accumulate over time to form new species (inference).

In relation to the publication of Darwin's Origins of Species, Mayr identified philosophical implications of evolution:

- Evolving world, not a static one.
- Implausibility of creationism.
- Refutation that the universe has purpose.
- Defeating the justifications for a human-centric world.
- Materialistic processes explain the impression of design.
- Population thinking replaces essentialism.

== Bibliography ==
=== Books ===
- Mayr, Ernst (1999) [1942]. Systematics and the Origin of Species. New York: Columbia University Press. ISBN 978-0-674-86250-0 – via Internet Archive.
- Mayr, Ernst (1945). Birds of the Southwest Pacific: A Field Guide to the Birds of the Area Between Samoa, New Caledonia, and Micronesia. New York: Macmillan – via Internet Archive.
- Mayr, Ernst (1963). Animal Species and Evolution. Cambridge: Belknap Press of Harvard University Press. ISBN 978-0-674-03750-2
- Mayr, Ernst (1969). Principles of Systematic Zoology (1st ed.). New York: McGraw-Hill – via Internet Archive.
- Mayr, Ernst (1970). Populations, Species, and Evolution. Cambridge: Belknap Press of Harvard University Press. ISBN 978-0-674-69013-4.
- Mayr, Ernst (1976). Evolution and the Diversity of Life. Cambridge: Belknap Press of Harvard University Press. ISBN 978-0-674-27105-0.
- Mayr, Ernst; William B. Provine, eds. (1980). The Evolutionary Synthesis: Perspectives on the Unification of Biology. Harvard University Press. ISBN 0-674-27225-0 – via Internet Archive.
- Mayr, Ernst (1982). The Growth of Biological Thought. Cambridge (Mass.): Belknap P. of Harvard U.P. ISBN 978-0-674-36446-2.
- Mayr, Ernst (1988). Toward a New Philosophy of Biology. Cambridge: Harvard University Press. ISBN 978-0-674-89666-6.
- Mayr, Ernst; Ashlock, Peter D. (1991). Principles of Systematic Zoology (2nd ed.). New York: McGraw-Hill. ISBN 978-0-07-041144-9 – via Internet Archive.
- Mayr, Ernst (1991). One Long Argument. Cambridge: Harvard University Press. ISBN 978-0-674-63906-5 – via Internet Archive.
- Mayr, Ernst (1997). This Is Biology. Cambridge: Belknap Press of Harvard University Press. ISBN 978-0-674-88469-4.
- Mayr, Ernst; Diamond, Jared (2001). The Birds of Northern Melanesia. Oxford: Oxford University Press. ISBN 978-0-19-514170-2.
- Mayr, Ernst (2001). What Evolution Is. New York: Basic Books. ISBN 978-0-465-04426-9.
- Mayr, Ernst (2004). What Makes Biology Unique?. Cambridge: Cambridge University Press. ISBN 978-0-521-84114-6 – via Internet Archive.

=== Global reviews of species new to science ===
- Zimmer, J. T.; Mayr, E. (1943). "New Species of Birds Described from 1938 to 1941". The Auk. 60 (2): 249–262. doi:10.2307/4079651. JSTOR 4079651.
- Mayr, E. (1957). "New species of birds described from 1941 to 1955". Journal of Ornithology. 98 (1): 22–08. Bibcode:1957JOrn...98...22M. doi:10.1007/BF01677166. S2CID 45014054.
- Mayr, E. (1971). "New species of birds described from 1956 to 1965". Journal of Ornithology. 112 (3): 302–316. Bibcode:1971JOrn..112..302M. doi:10.1007/BF01640689. S2CID 245710.
- Mayr, E.; Vuilleumier, F. (1983). "New species of birds described from 1966 to 1975". Journal of Ornithology. 124 (3): 217. Bibcode:1983JOrn..124..217M. doi:10.1007/BF01640607. S2CID 24273749.
- Vuilleumier, F.; Mayr, E. (1987). "New species of birds described from 1976 to 1980". Journal für Ornithologie. 128 (2): 137. Bibcode:1987JOrn..128..137V. doi:10.1007/BF01661691. S2CID 27239055.
- Vuilleumier, François; LeCroy, Mary; Mayr, Ernst (1992). "New species of birds described from 1981 to 1990". Bulletin of the British Ornithologists' Club. 112A: 26.

=== Other notable publications ===
- 1923 "Die Kolbenente (Nyroca rufina) auf dem Durchzuge in Sachsen". Ornithologische Monatsberichte 31:135–136
- 1923 "Der Zwergfliegenschnäpper bei Greifswald". Ornithologische Monatsberichte 31:136
- 1926 "Die Ausbreitung des Girlitz (Serinus canaria serinus L.) Ein Beitrag zur Tiergeographie". J. für Ornithologie 74:571–671
- 1927 "Die Schneefinken (Gattungen Montifringilla und Leucosticte)" J. für Ornithologie 75:596–619
- 1929 with W Meise. Zeitschriftenverzeichnis des Museums für Naturkunde Mitteilungen aus dem Zoologischen Museum in Berlin 14:1–187
- 1930 (by Ernst Hartert) "List of birds collected by Ernst Mayr". Ornithologische Monatsberichte 36:27–128
- 1930 "My Dutch New Guinea Expedition". 1928. Ornithologische Monatsberichte 36:20–26
- 1931 Die Vögel des Saruwaged und Herzoggebirges (NO Neuginea) Mitteilungen aus dem Zoologischen Museum in Berlin 17:639–723
- 1931 "Birds collected during the Whitney South Sea Expedition. XII Notes on Halcyon chloris and some of its subspecies". American Museum Novitates no 469
- 1932 "A tenderfoot explorer in New Guinea" Natural History 32:83–97
- 1935 "Bernard Altum and the territory theory". Proceedings of the Linnaean Society of New York 45, 46:24–38
- 1938 Birds of the Crane Pacific expedition, Ernst Mayr and Sidney Camras, Zoological Series of the Field Museum of Natural History, Volume XX, No. 34.
- 1940 "Speciation phenomena in birds". American Naturalist 74:249–278
- 1941 "Borders and subdivision of the Polynesian region as based on our knowledge of the distribution of birds". Proceedings of the 6th Pacific Scientific Congress 4:191–195
- 1941 "The origin and history of the bird fauna of Polynesia". Proceedings of the 6th Pacific Scientific Congress 4:197–216
- 1943 "A journey to the Solomons". Natural History 52:30–37,48
- 1944 "Wallace's Line in the light of recent zoogeographics studies". Quarterly Review of Biology 19:1–14
- 1944 "The birds of Timor and Sumba". Bulletin of the American Museum of Natural History 83:123–194
- 1944 "Timor and the colonization of Australia by birds". Emu 44:113–130
- 1946 "History of the North American bird fauna" Wilson Bulletin 58:3–41
- 1946 "The naturalist in Leidy's time and today". Proceedings of the Academy of Natural Sciences of Philadelphia 98:271–276
- 1947 "Ecological factors in speciation". Evolution 1:263–288
- 1948 "The new Sanford Hall". Natural History 57:248–254
- 1950 The role of the antennae in the mating behavior of female Drosophila. Evolution 4:149–154
- 1951 Introduction and Conclusion. Pages 85,255–258 in The problem of land connections across the South Atlantic with special reference to the Mesozoic. Bulletin of the American Museum of Natural History 99:79–258
- 1951 with Dean Amadon, "A classification of recent birds". American Museum Novitates no. 1496
- 1953 with E G Linsley and R L Usinger. Methods and Principles of Systematica Zoology. McGraw-Hill, New York.
- 1954 "Changes in genetic environment and evolution". Pages 157–180 in Evolution as a Process (J Huxley, A C Hardy and E B Ford Eds) Allen and Unwin. London
- 1955 "Karl Jordan's contribution to current concepts in systematics and evolution". Transactions of the Royal Entomological Society of London 107:45–66
- 1956 with C B Rosen. "Geographic variation and hybridization in populations of Bahama snails (Cerion)". American Museum Novitates no 1806.
- 1957 "Species concepts and definitions". Pages 371–388 in The Species Problem (E. Mayr ed). AAAS, Washington DC.
- 1959 "The emergence of evolutionary novelties". Pages 349–380 in The Evolution of Life: Evolution after Darwin, vol 1 (S. Tax, ed) University of Chicago.
- 1959 "Darwin and the evolutionary theory in Biology". Pages 1–10 in Evolution and Anthropology: A Centennial Appraisal (B J Meggers, Ed) The Anthropological Society of Washington, Washington DC.
- 1959 "Agassiz, Darwin, and Evolution". Harvard Library Bulletin. 13:165–194
- 1961 "Cause and effect in biology: Kinds of causes, predictability, and teleology are viewed by a practicing biologist". Science 134:1501–1506
- 1962 "Accident or design: The paradox of evolution". Pages 1–14 in The Evolution of Living Organisms (G W Leeper, Ed) Melbourne University Press.
- 1964 Introduction, Bibliography and Subject Pages vii–xxviii, 491–513 in On the Origin of Species by Means of Natural Selection, or the Preservation of Favoured Races in the Struggle for Life, by Charles Darwin. A Facsimile of the First Edition. Harvard University Press.
- 1965 Comments. In Proceedings of the Boston Colloguium for the Philosophy of Science, 1962–1964. Boston Studies in the Philosophy of Science 2:151–156
- 1967 with William H. Phelps Jr., The Origin of the Bird Fauna of the South Venezuelan Highlands. Bulletin of the American Museum of Natural History, 1967.
- 1969 Discussion: Footnotes on the philosophy of biology. Philosophy of Science 36:197–202
- 1972 Continental drift and the history of the Australian bird fauna. Emu 72:26–28
- 1972 Geography and ecology as faunal determinants. Pages 549–561 in Proceedings XVth International Ornithological Congress (K H Voous, Ed) E J Brill, Leiden, The Netherlands.
- 1972 Lamarck revisited. Journal of the History of Biology. 5:55–94
- 1974 Teleological and teleonomic: A new analysis. Boston studies in the Philosophy of Science 14:91–117
- 1978 Tenure: A sacred cow? Science 199:1293
- 1980 How I became a Darwinian, Pages 413–423 in The Evolutionary Synthesis (E Mayr and W Provine, Eds) Harvard University Press, Cambridge, Massachusetts.
- 1980 with W B Provine, Eds. The Evolutionary Synthesis. Harvard University Press.
- 1981 Evolutionary biology. Pages 147–162 in The Joys of Research (W. Shripshire Jr, Ed.) Smithsonian Institution Press.
- 1984 Evolution and ethics. Pages 35–46 in Darwin, Mars and Freud: Their influence on Moral Theory (A L Caplan and B Jennings, Eds.) Plenum Press, New York.
- 1985. Darwin's five theories of evolution. In D. Kohn, ed., The Darwinian Heritage, Princeton NJ: Princeton University Press, pp. 755–772.
- 1985. How biology differs from the physical sciences. In D. J. Depew and B H Weber, eds., Evolution at a Crossroads: The New Biology and the New Philosophy of Science, Cambridge MA: The MIT Press, pp. 43–63.
- 1988. The why and how of species. Biology and Philosophy 3:431–441
- 1992. The idea of teleology. Journal of the History of Ideas 53:117–135
- 1994. with W.J. Bock. Provisional classifications v. standard avian sequences: heuristics and communication in ornithology. Ibis 136:12–18
- 1996. What is a species, and what is not? Philosophy of Science 63 (June): 262–277.
- 1996. The autonomy of biology: the position of biology among the sciences. Quarterly Review of Biology 71:97–106
- 1997. The objects of selection Proc. Natl. Acad. Sci. USA 94 (March): 2091–94.
- 1999. Darwin's influence on modern thought Crafoord Prize lecture, September 23, 1999.
- 2000. Biology in the Twenty-First Century Bioscience 50 (Oct. 2000): 895–897.
- 2001. Mayr, E. (2001), "The philosophical foundations of Darwinism" (PDF), Proceedings of the American Philosophical Society, 145 (4): 488–495, PMID 11894859, archived from the original (PDF) on 2008-04-14
- 2002. with Walter J Bock. Classifications and other ordering systems. Zeitschrift Zool. Syst. Evolut-Forsch. 40:1–25

== See also ==
- American philosophy
- Biosemiotics
- Evolution
- List of American philosophers
- List of centenarians (scientists and mathematicians)
- Species Problem
- Philosophy of biology
- Proximate and ultimate causation
