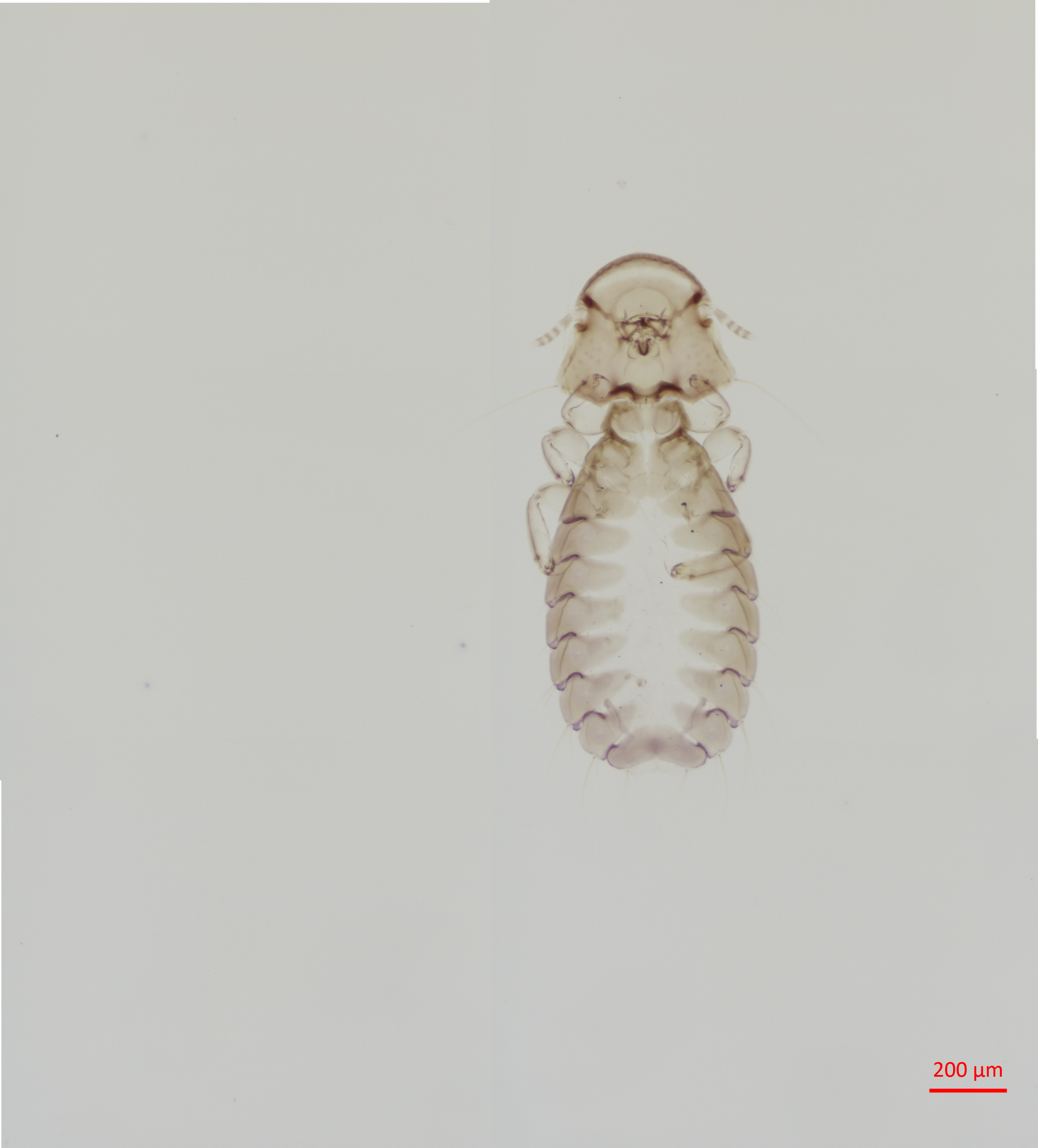
- Holotype specimen held at the Natural History Museum, London

Scientific classification
- Domain: Eukaryota
- Kingdom: Animalia
- Phylum: Arthropoda
- Class: Insecta
- Order: Psocodea
- Family: Philopteridae
- Genus: Campanulotes
- Species: C. elegans

Binomial name
- Campanulotes elegans (Tendeiro, 1978)

Synonyms
- Campanulotes flavus elegans (Tendeiro, 1978)

= Campanulotes elegans =

Species of louse

Campanulotes elegans is a species of lice in the disputed, probably paraphyletic, family Philopteridae, the chewing lice, or in the family Goniodidae.

It is a parasite on Phaps elegans, the brush bronzewing, a species of bird in the pigeon family endemic to Australia.
