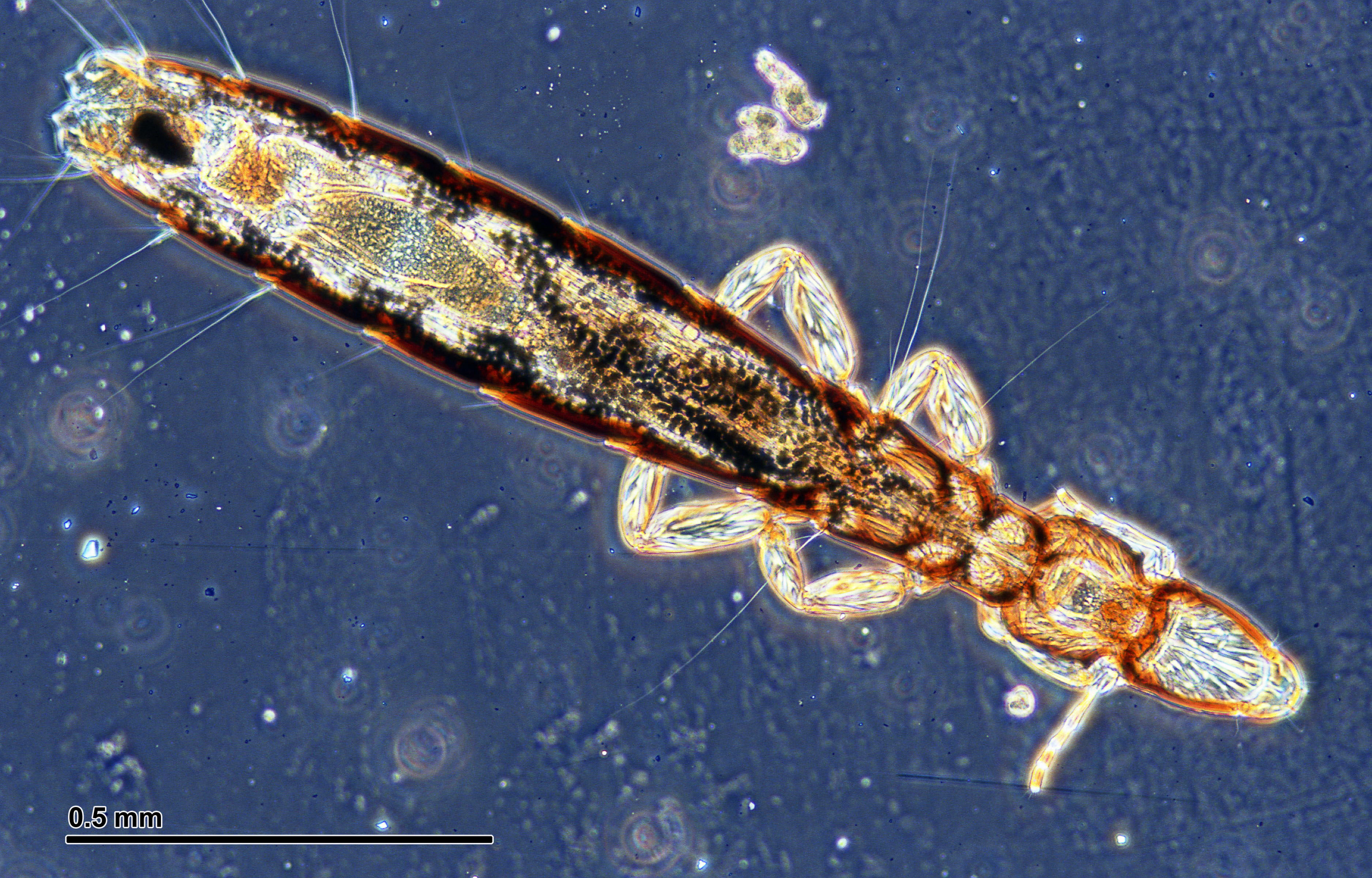

Scientific classification
- Kingdom: Animalia
- Phylum: Arthropoda
- Class: Insecta
- Order: Psocodea
- Infraorder: Phthiraptera
- Family: Philopteridae
- Genus: Columbicola
- Species: C. columbae

Binomial name
- Columbicola columbae (Linnaeus, 1758)

= Columbicola columbae =

Species of lice

Columbicola columbae, also known as the slender pigeon louse, is a species of lice in the genus Columbicola. It is very host-specific, feeding primarily on only 4 different species of birds. C. columbae are ectoparasites, usually feeding only on the superficial layer of the skin.
