= Saemundssonia laticaudata =

Scientific classification
- Domain: Eukaryota
- Kingdom: Animalia
- Phylum: Arthropoda
- Class: Insecta
- Order: Psocodea
- Family: Philopteridae
- Genus: Saemundssonia
- Species: S. laticaudata

Binomial name
- Saemundssonia laticaudata {Rudow, 1869)

Species of louse

Saemundssonia laticaudata is an insect species first described in 1869. It is part of the Saemundssonia genus and the Philopteridae family. It is a parasite of the Greater crested tern.
