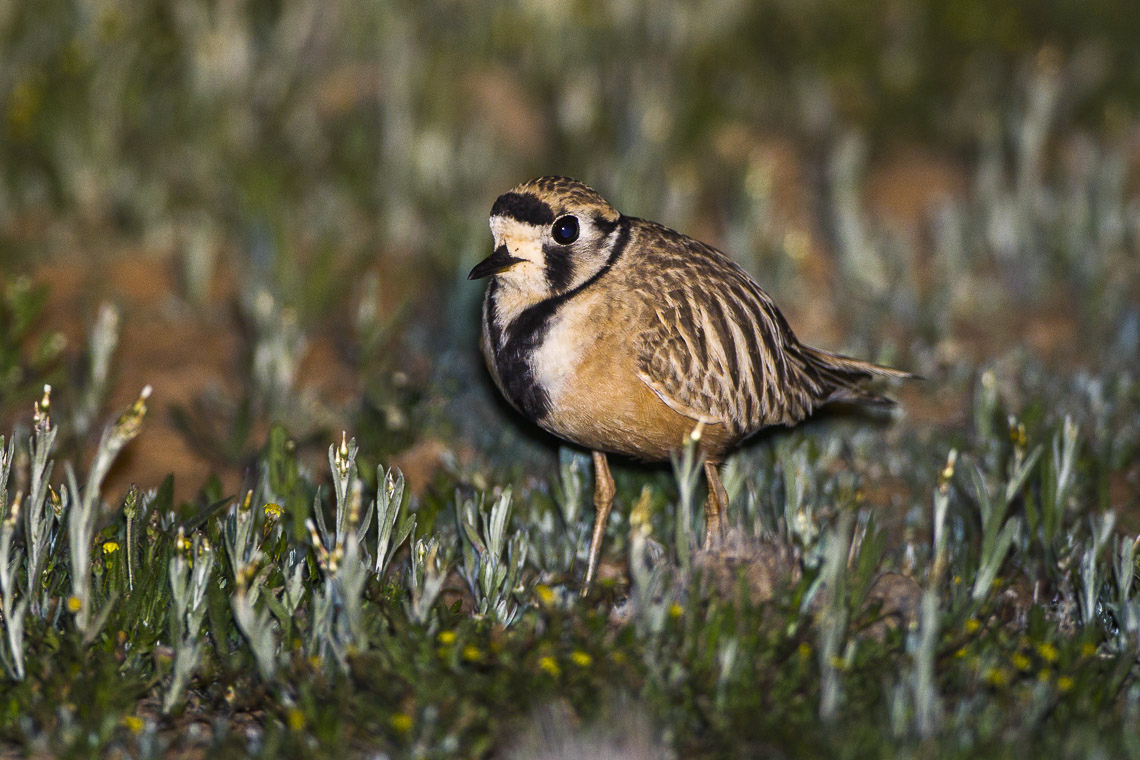

Conservation status
- Least Concern (IUCN 3.1)

Scientific classification
- Kingdom: Animalia
- Phylum: Chordata
- Class: Aves
- Order: Charadriiformes
- Family: Charadriidae
- Genus: Peltohyas; Sharpe, 1896
- Species: P. australis

Binomial name
- Peltohyas australis (Gould, 1841)
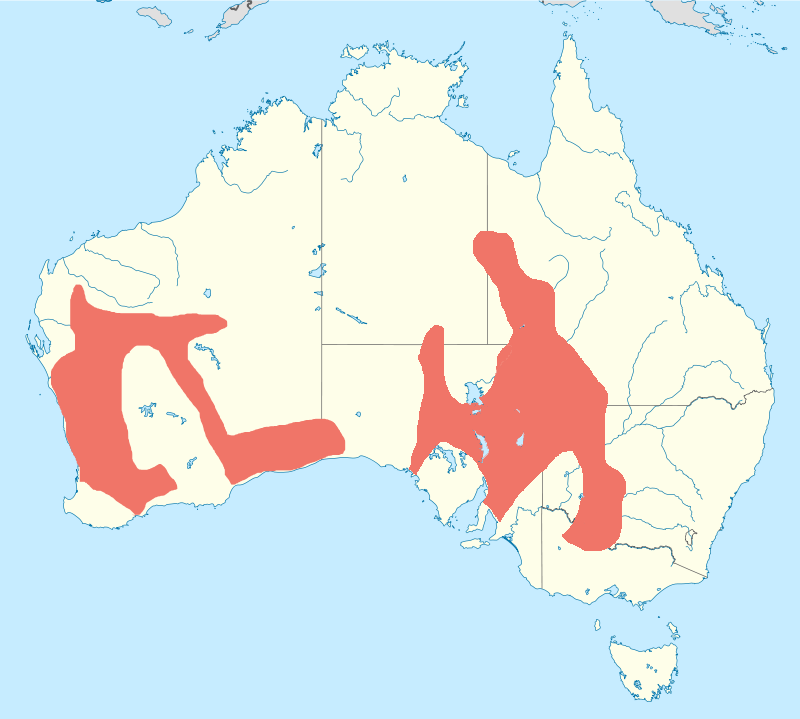
- Distribution of inland dotterel

Synonyms
- Charadrius australis

= Inland dotterel =

Species of bird

The inland dotterel or inland plover (Peltohyas australis) is an endemic bird of the arid Australian interior. It forms loose flocks in sparsely vegetated gibber plain and claypans in the day where it loafs in the shade and eats shoots of shrubs. It is most often encountered at night when it forages on roads for insects. The relative remoteness of its habitat means that it is not well studied. The most detailed observations of the species were made by the South African arid-zone ornithology specialist Gordon Maclean in the 1970s. Alternate English names include Australian plover, inland plover, desert plover and prairie plover.

== Description ==
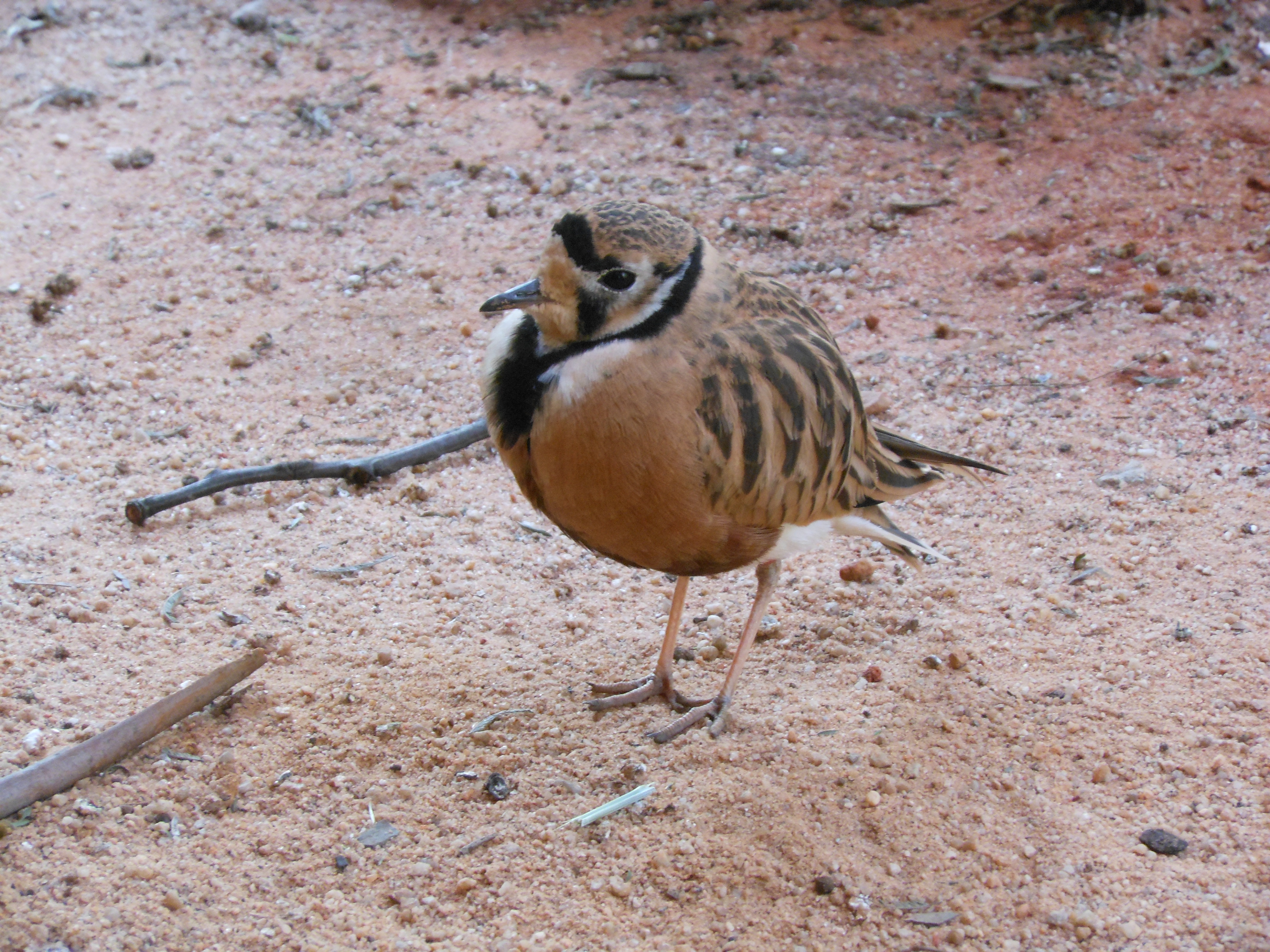
Captive bird photographed at Healesville Sanctuary, Victoria, Australia

The inland dotterel is a medium-sized plover with a distinctive cryptic plumage. Males and females are similarly sized: 19–23 cm (7.5–9 in) in length, a wingspan of 43–47 cm (17–19 in) a weight of 80–90 g (2.8–3.2 oz), and a short bill 1.7 cm (0.67 in).

It is unlikely to be confused with any other species when found in its normal habitat. Its upperparts are a rich sandy buff, mottled with dark brown. The black band across the crown extending down through the eye is unique. The face, ear coverts and neck are white, as is the vent. A broad black Y-shaped band extends from the hindneck down the sides of the neck across the breast to the centre of the belly. Below the band the breast, flanks and belly are sandy buff. The legs are a pale buff colour, with the feet noticeably darker. The eye is dark brown. It has a short dark bill. Males and females have similar plumage. Maclean observed that the birds moulted into a paler, less bold non-breeding plumage. Immature birds lack the distinct black markings on the head, neck and breast of the adults. It calls infrequently, most often a short quiet quick or guttural kroot or krrr when taking flight. The precocial young have short dense downy feathers, pinkish-buff or cream on the upperparts with a heavy pattern of dark brown blotches. The underparts are off white. The bill and legs are pale yellow.

== Taxonomy and systematics ==
The inland dotterel was first documented in 1840 after Captain Charles Sturt collected an immature bird on one of his expeditions to the Australian interior and sent it to John Gould. Gould initially named it Eudromias australis (from the Greek eu, good, and dromos, runner, and australis, of the southern continent).

The inland dotterel is one of over 60 shorebird species in the family Charadriidae, although it is rarely seen near water. Its taxonomic position continues to cause debate. The initial scientific name Eudromias australis supposed a generic relationship to the Eurasian dotterel (E. morinellus) that does not exist. Some modern authors place it in Charadrius, most closely related to the oriental plover (C. veredus) on mtDNA and protein allozyme evidence. Most authorities currently recognize the monotypic genera Peltohyas for the inland dotterel. Baker supported Peltohyas and placed the inland dotterel in a clade with other Australasian endemic genera (which also coincidentally consist a single species) the red-kneed dotterel (Erythrogons cinctus) and the wrybill (Anaryhnchus frontalis) of New Zealand. The Australian ornithologist Gregory M. Mathews proposed the subspecies C. australis whitlocki for birds in western Australia based on supposedly darker plumage, but the validity of this has been disputed.

== Distribution ==
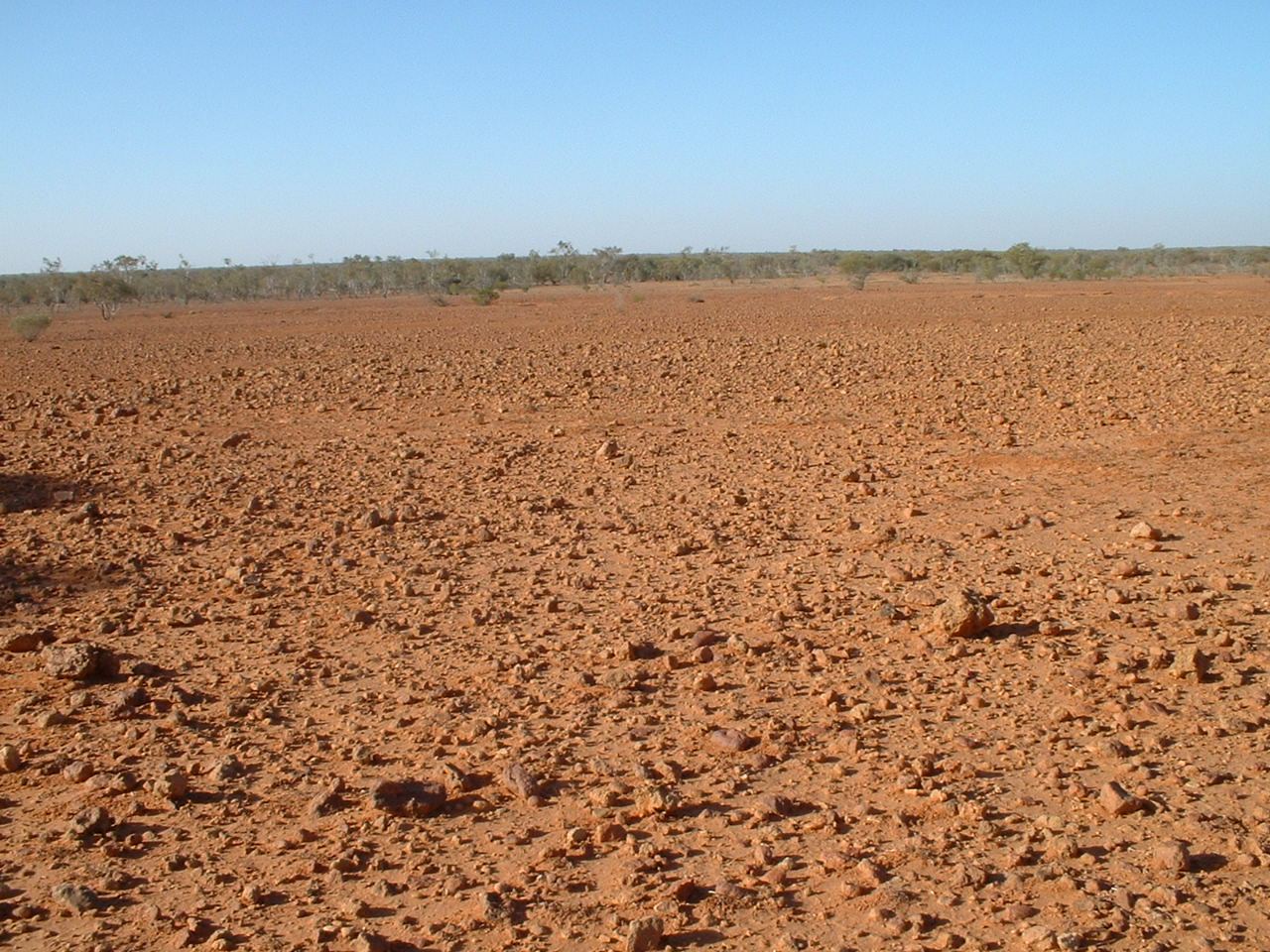
Gibber plains, Sturt National Park

The inland dotterel occurs widely in the arid south-east and south-west of Australia. Its distribution corresponds to areas below the 100mm summer rainfall isohyet. It can be found in suitable habitat within this range in all the mainland states.

== Habitat ==
Inland dotterels prefer sparsely vegetated habitat with low cover of 200–400 mm (7.9–15.7 in) saltbush, bluebush or samphire to provide food and shelter. It is most often seen in gibber plains, clay pans and gravel flats. It is believed to have benefited from land clearance for agriculture after European settlement. Movements are not well known – there appear to be seasonal movements south in the spring and north in the summer and there seems to be some movement beyond its normal range when excessive rains or severe drought makes habitat unsuitable. Vagrant birds have been observed as far as Sydney, NSW.

== Behaviour and ecology ==
Typically in the day the birds associate in loose flocks of 10-20 birds, occasionally hundreds of birds. They are generally inactive in daytime, although they will forage on plants. At dusk the flock disperses and night sees most activity with individual birds hunting a variety of insect prey. It is during this activity that they are often encountered on outback roads. They tolerate high temperatures but will seek cover if the temperature exceeds 40 C (104 F). When approached they prefer to run away rather than fly.

=== Food ===
During the day the fleshy tips of desert shrubs are eaten. Inland dotterel have supraorbital salt glands, and it is thought these glands enable them to remove the salt content of the plants and hence use herbivory to source water. They have occasionally been observed drinking with large flocks gathering at stock tanks and clay-pans. At night the diet is insectivorous and spiders, grasshoppers, beetles, ants and earwigs have been recorded in gut contents.

=== Breeding ===
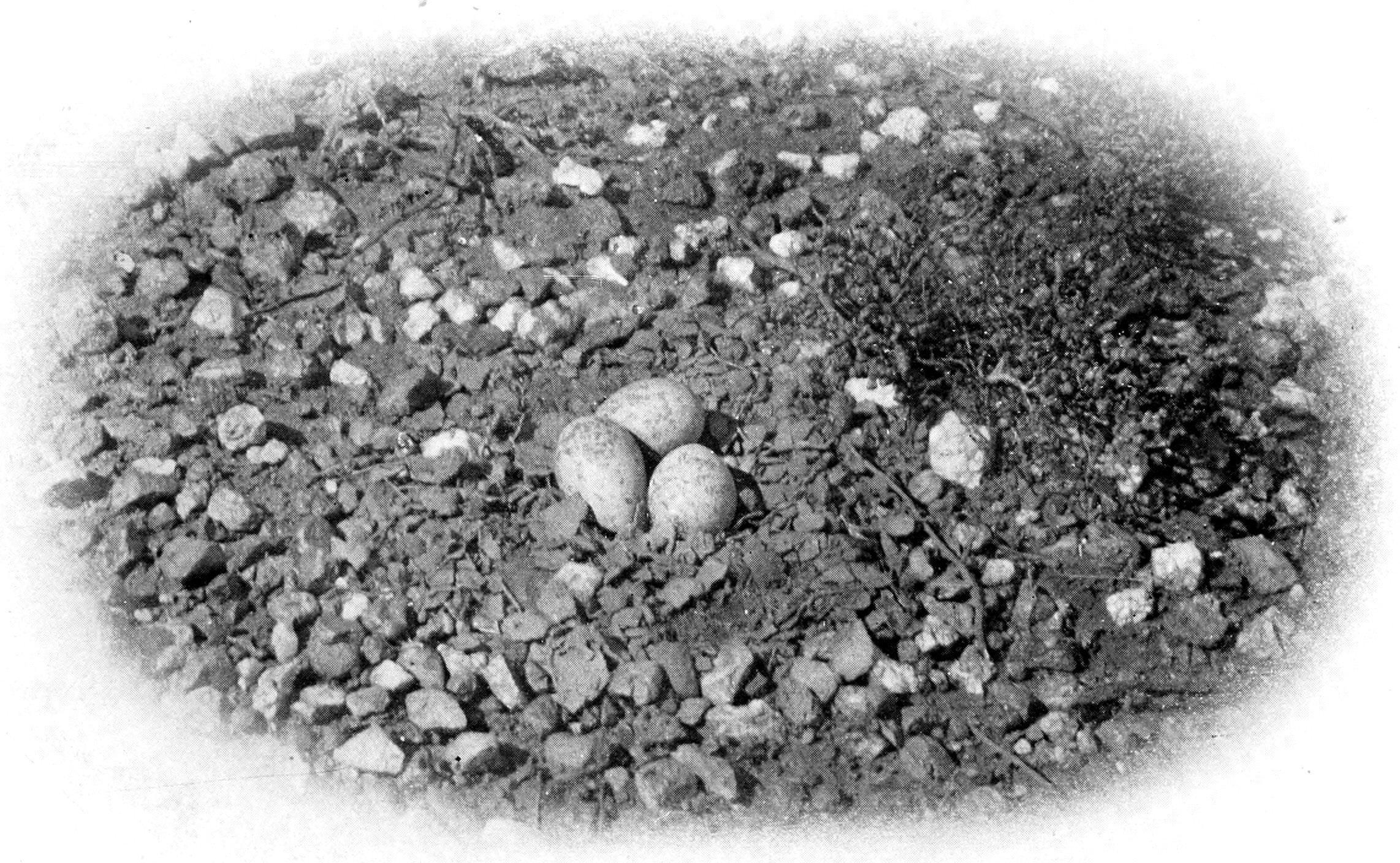
Photo of nest site with eggs by Whitlock, East Murchison, 1909.

Inland dotterels form monogamous pairs when breeding, and both birds care for the young. May breed solitarily or in small colonies of up to six nests. Believed to breed at any time of the year if conditions are suitable, but generally breeding not well known, much data restricted to captive pairs. The nest is a shallow depression in bare ground, formed by the birds or taking advantage of a suitable natural depression. A clutch of three eggs is laid. The eggs are oval medium brown coloured with an irregular pattern of dark brown blotches, 3.7 cm x 2.7 cm.

=== Threats ===
In the inland dotterel's sparse desert habitat there are few significant threats. Foxes (Vulpes vulpes) have been observed predating eggs and young. Black falcon (Falco subniger) and nankeen kestrel (Falco cenchroides) have been observed attacking adults.

=== Parasites ===
Two parasitic lice have been recorded on inland dotterel, Austromenopon sp. and Quadraceps neoaustralis.

== Conservation ==
While there are no reliable estimates, it is believed the across its range the population is relatively large and stable. The conservation classification at the IUCN is least concern. It is not listed in any Australian Federal or State acts, but is listed as vulnerable on the Victorian governments advisory list of threatened vertebrate fauna.
