= Halipeurus pelagicus =

Scientific classification
- Domain: Eukaryota
- Kingdom: Animalia
- Phylum: Arthropoda
- Class: Insecta
- Order: Psocodea
- Family: Philopteridae
- Genus: Halipeurus
- Species: H. pelagicus

Binomial name
- Halipeurus pelagicus (Denny, 1842)

Species of louse

Halipeurus pelagicus is a species of phtilopterid louse found on seabirds including the European storm petrel, but it is not found on the Wilson's storm petrel.
