= Population thinking =

Conceptual framework in evolutionary biology

Population thinking is a concept in evolutionary biology coined by Ernst Mayr as part of his contributions to the modern evolutionary synthesis. It represents a framework by which biological variation in nature is examined.

== Concept ==
Population thinking stresses that variation is inherent to populations of any organism and is the object to be studied. It is tied to the neo-Darwinian framework of the individual as the unit of selection, and asserts that statistics such as mean values of a given trait are mathematical abstractions that real biological phenomena like natural selection do not act upon, instead acting upon the real traits of every one specific individual organism separately. It stands in opposition to biological typology and essentialism, which treat variation in a species as a deviation from a species' essence.

== Impact ==
The limited permeation of population thinking into human genetics has been interpreted as a cause of the persistence of typological racial views in the field.

== Criticism ==
Joeri Witteveen has criticised Mayr's population thinking concept, arguing that it conflated two separate conceptual distinctions made by George Gaylord Simpson and Theodosius Dobzhansky in their respective fields. Simpson, a palaeontologist, had articulated a methodology by which intraspecific variation could be assessed in the fossil record and apply statistical rigour to taxonomy of fossil species, which prior to Simpson had been highly arbitrary and based on how distinct or similar it was to that species' type specimen and a vague rule of thumb that specimens that differ in a given metric by more than 15% are different species. Dobzhansky, a geneticist, had critiqued what he considered the typological concepts of a phenotypic 'racial type' and 'wild type' towards which natural selection drove populations of organisms. Mayr, in Witteveen's view, meshed separate concepts together in order to rhetorically promote the modern synthesis.
