= Colpocephalum californici =

Scientific classification
- Kingdom: Animalia
- Phylum: Arthropoda
- Clade: Pancrustacea
- Class: Insecta
- Order: Psocodea
- Infraorder: Phthiraptera
- Family: Menoponidae
- Genus: Colpocephalum
- Species: †C. californici

Binomial name
- †Colpocephalum californici Price & Beer, 1963

Extinct species of louse

Colpocephalum californici, the California condor louse, is an extinct species of chewing louse which parasitized the California condor (Gymnogyps californianus). In an example of coextinction, it became extinct when the remaining, Critically Endangered California condors were deloused and treated with pesticides during a captive breeding program.

== Taxonomic history ==
This species was described in 1963 by Roger D. Price and James R. Beer. They based their description on nine lice (four females, five males), all collected from California condors. The holotype was collected from a California condor in the National Zoological Park, and it was deposited in the National Museum of Natural History. The authors wrote in their description: "Since the California condor now is very rare, these nine lice may well represent all that will ever be found."

Price and Beer placed the California condor louse in the megalops-group alongside C. megalops, C. foetens and C. trichosum.

== Description ==
=== Male ===
The male had two pairs of spine-like setae on the anterior margin of its head, as well as four to eight mid-dorsal head setae. The temple width was 0.50–0.53 millimetres (0.020–0.021 in) and its prothorax width was 0.34–0.40 millimetres (0.013–0.016 in).

=== Female ===
The female had at most four mid-dorsal head setae. Its I and II abdominal segments were only a bit longer than its III segment. The lateral tergocentral setae on segments II and III were not longer than the median setae.

== Biology ==
This louse was reportedly not harmful to its hosts.

== Extinction ==
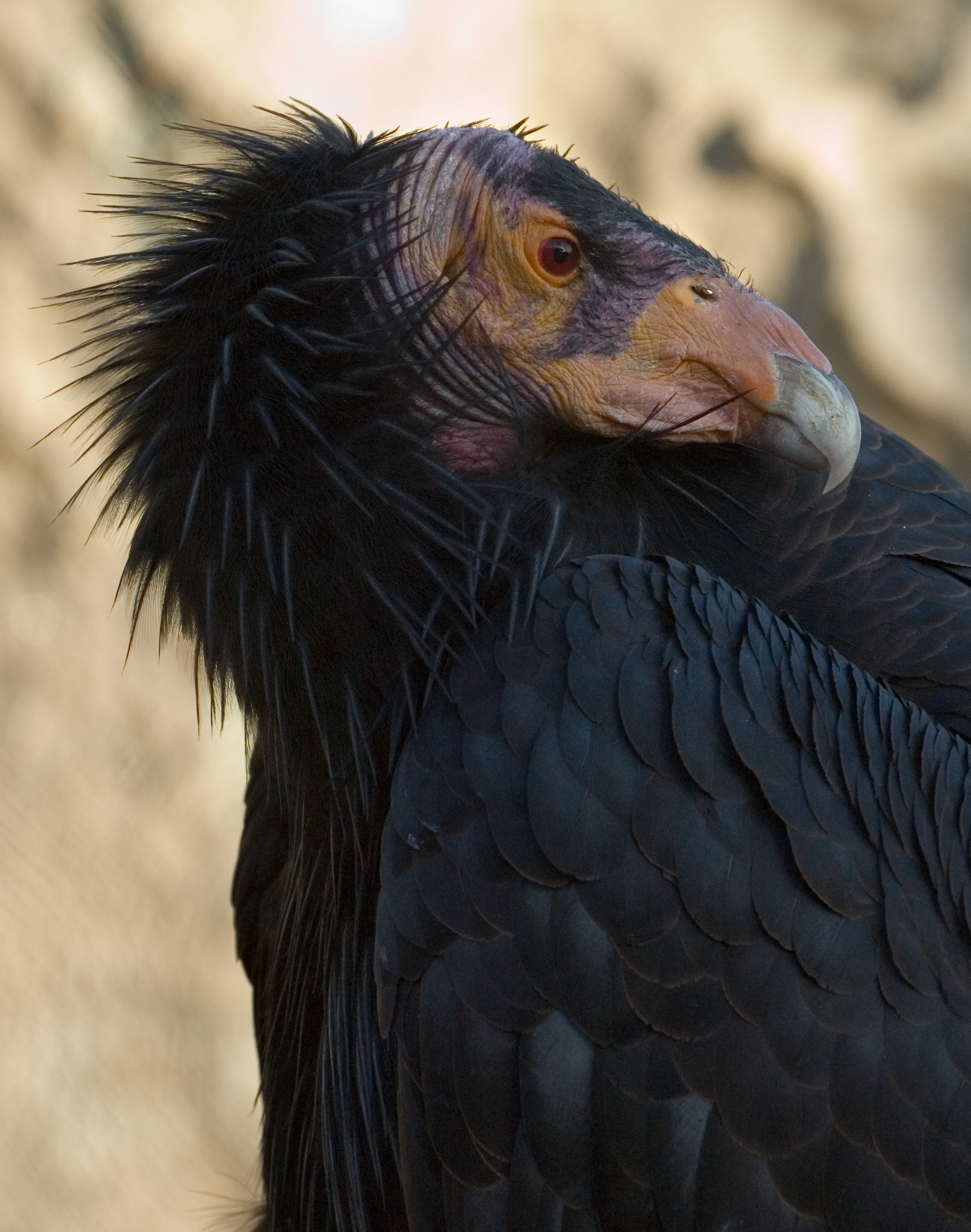
California condor

In the 1980s, all California condors were brought to the Los Angeles Zoo and the San Diego Zoo's Wild Animal Park for a captive breeding program. Conservationists treated all the condors with a pesticide to kill their lice, and so C. californici is now presumed extinct. This species' extinction is an instance of conservation-induced extinction. Conservation biology of parasites is essential as often the parasites are overlooked and the host species is prioritized.

People were expressing concern about the loss of the California condor louse by the 1990s. One 1990 letter to the journal Nature began, "In the attempt to save certain species from extinction, for example the California condor, the black-footed ferret and so on, how much attention is being given to the natural parasites?" Another letter to Nature closed with "There may be conflicts in conservation needs, forcing us to bid farewell to the gorilla louse or the lice of the Californian condor while retaining their hosts. If so, we should do so in the full knowledge of what is being lost." The C. californici extinction is an often-discussed example when emphasizing the importance of parasite conservation both in academic works and elsewhere. One 2011 paper in the Annual Review of Entomology called this a "poignant example" of the loss of biodiversity, and noted that the role this species played in its host's ecology was not fully understood. It has also been pointed out that studying the genetics of C. californici could have provided information about the California condor's evolutionary history. Biologists have also wondered if the California condors remained parasite-free or if generalist parasites, which might cause worse health impacts, later replaced them.
