= Coloceras =

Scientific classification
- Kingdom: Animalia
- Phylum: Arthropoda
- Clade: Pancrustacea
- Class: Insecta
- Order: Psocodea
- Infraorder: Phthiraptera
- Family: Philopteridae
- Genus: Coloceras; Taschenberg, 1882

Genus of lice

Coloceras is a genus of insects in the family Philopteridae.

== Species ==
- Coloceras absimile
- Coloceras aduncum
- Coloceras aegypticum
- Coloceras aethiopicum
- Coloceras alloceratum
- Coloceras apicaudae
- Coloceras aplopeliae
- Coloceras benoiti
- Coloceras brelihi
- Coloceras britannicum
- Coloceras bychovskyi
- Coloceras carrikeri
- Coloceras castroi
- Coloceras chinense
- Coloceras clayae
- Coloceras clypeatum
- Coloceras damicorne
- Coloceras doreyanus
- Coloceras elbeli
- Coloceras emersoni
- Coloceras fasciatum
- Coloceras fradei
- Coloceras funebreae
- Coloceras furcatum
- Coloceras geopeliae
- Coloceras grande
- Coloceras guinea
- Coloceras harrisoni
- Coloceras hemiphagae
- Coloceras hilli
- Coloceras hoogstraali
- Coloceras indicum
- Coloceras israelensis
- Coloceras laticlypeatus
- Coloceras lativentris
- Coloceras liviae
- Coloceras menadense
- Coloceras museihalense
- Coloceras neoindicum
- Coloceras nitens
- Coloceras novaeseelandiae
- Coloceras orientalis
- Coloceras piageti
- Coloceras piriformis
- Coloceras procerum
- Coloceras pugioclavatus
- Coloceras quadraticus
- Coloceras restinctus
- Coloceras santhomae
- Coloceras savoi
- Coloceras setosum
- Coloceras stephanii
- Coloceras streptopeliae
- Coloceras taschenbergi
- Coloceras uchidai
- Coloceras unchalli
