= Campanulotes =

Scientific classification
- Domain: Eukaryota
- Kingdom: Animalia
- Phylum: Arthropoda
- Class: Insecta
- Order: Psocodea
- Family: Philopteridae
- Genus: Campanulotes; Kéler 1939

Species
- Campanulotes bidentatus; Campanulotes campanulatus; Campanulotes defectus; Campanulotes durdeni; Campanulotes elegans; Campanulotes flavus; Campanulotes frenatus; Campanulotes sp. Saussurites JDW-2010

Synonyms
- Nitzschielloides

Genus of lice

Campanulotes is a genus of lice in the disputed, probably paraphyletic, family Philopteridae, the chewing lice, or in the family Goniodidae.

It is mostly a genus of parasites on birds.

Some species in the genus may have been cases of coextinction. The species Campanulotes defectus was thought to have been unique to the passenger pigeon (Ectopistes migratorius), an extinct bird from North America, but is now believed to have been a case of a contaminated specimen, as the species is considered to be the still-extant Campanulotes flavus of Australia.

Known species of ectoparasites of the common rock dove include Campanulotes bidentatus compar.
