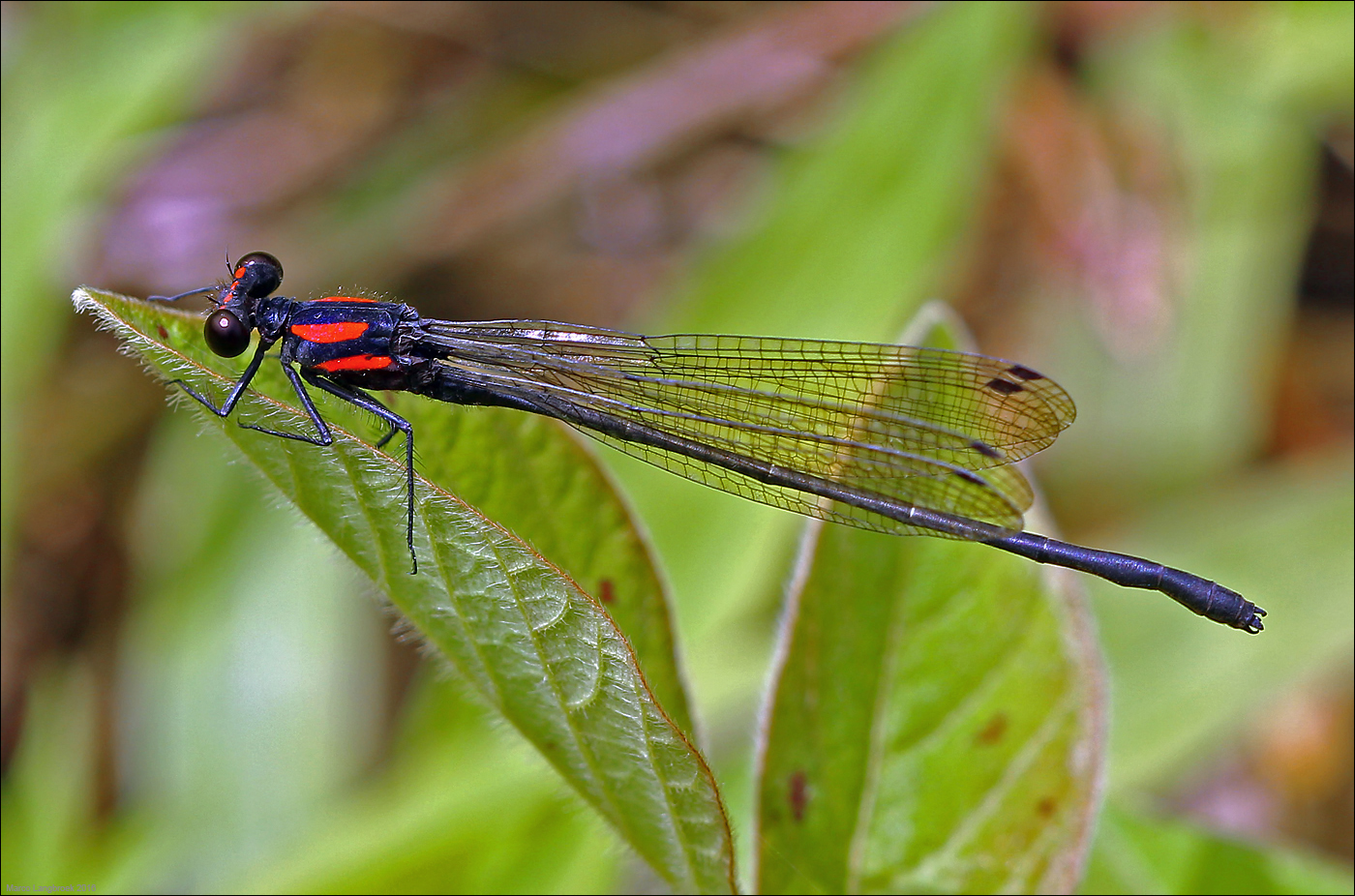
- Male photographed near Syoubri, Mokwam, Arfak Mountains, New Guinea.

Scientific classification
- Kingdom: Animalia
- Phylum: Arthropoda
- Clade: Pancrustacea
- Class: Insecta
- Order: Odonata
- Suborder: Zygoptera
- Family: Platycnemididae
- Genus: Palaiargia
- Species: P. ernstmayri

Binomial name
- Palaiargia ernstmayri Lieftinck, 1972

= Palaiargia ernstmayri =

Species of damselfly

Palaiargia ernstmayri is a species of broad-winged damselfly in the family Platycnemididae. The species is endemic to the Arfak Mountains of New Guinea, with only four observations to date.

== Taxonomy and systematics ==
The scientific name of the species was first published in 1972 by Lieftinck. Lieftinck based the species on specimens in museum collections collected in 1928 at the village of Siwi by Ernst Mayr, and in 1957 at the village of Sururai by Hardy. The species has been reported only twice more, by S. Lamberts near Mokwam in 2011 and by Marco Langbroek near Syoubri in 2016.

== Description ==
Males of the species are almost completely dark, with two striking red stripes on the breast and red spots between the eyes. The lower abdomen appendages are hook-shaped.
