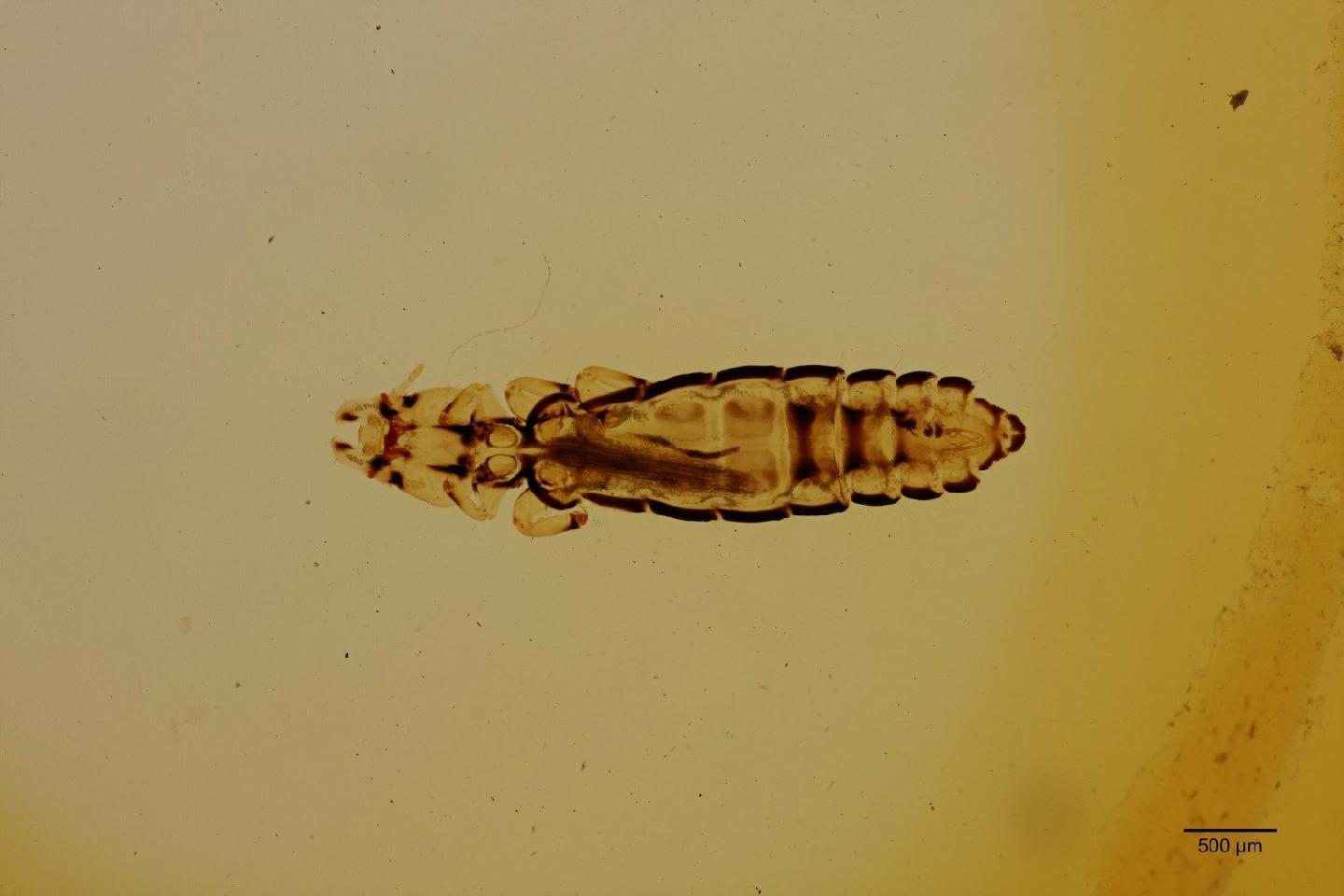
- Acidoproctus kelloggi paratype

Scientific classification
- Domain: Eukaryota
- Kingdom: Animalia
- Phylum: Arthropoda
- Class: Insecta
- Order: Psocodea
- Family: Philopteridae
- Genus: Acidoproctus; Piaget, 1878

Type species
- Acidoproctus marginatus Piaget (= A. rostratus), by subsequent designation

Species
- Acidoproctus emersoni Timmermann, 1962; Acidoproctus fuligulae Eichler, 1948; Acidoproctus gottwaldhirschi Eichler, 1958; Acidoproctus granthami Arnold, 2006; Acidoproctus hilli (Harrison, 1915); Acidoproctus maximus Piaget, 1878; Acidoproctus moschatae (Linnaeus, 1758); Acidoproctus rostratus (Rudow, 1866); Acidoproctus taschenbergi Hopkins, 1938

Synonyms
- Akidoproctus Piaget, 1880; Heteroproctus Harrison, 1915

= Acidoproctus =

Genus of lice

Acidoproctus is a genus of lice, in the family Philopteridae. They are known to be distributed across Asia and Australasia. There are two species in New Zealand.

== Taxonomy ==
Acidoproctus was erected by Édouard Piaget in 1878. The type species is Acidoproctus rostratus (Rudow, 1866b).

The genus contains at least the species:

- Acidoproctus rostratus (Rudow, 1866b).
- Acidoproctus emersoni Timmermann, 1962. hosts: Dendrocygna species.
- Acidoproctus gottwaldhirschi Eichler, 1958. host: blue duck. Endemic to New Zealand.
