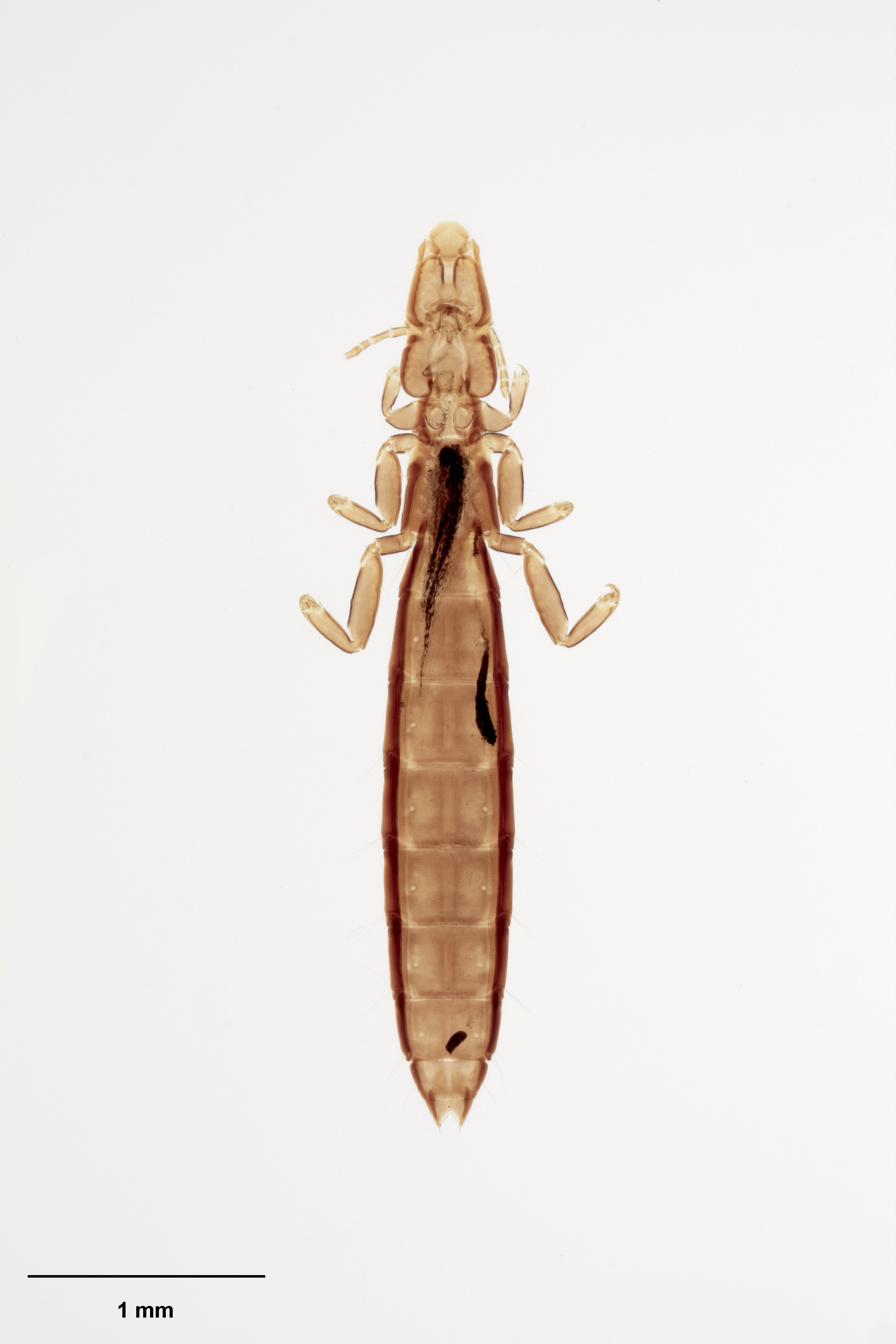
- Halipeurus pelagodromae

Scientific classification
- Domain: Eukaryota
- Kingdom: Animalia
- Phylum: Arthropoda
- Class: Insecta
- Order: Psocodea
- Family: Philopteridae
- Genus: Halipeurus; Thompson, 1936

Synonyms
- Anamias Timmermann, 1965; Synnautes Thompson, 1936

= Halipeurus =

Genus of insects

Halipeurus is a genus of parasitic bird lice in the family Philopteridae.

The genus has an almost cosmopolitan distribution.

== Species ==
The following species are recognised in the genus Halipeurus:

- Halipeurus abnormis (Piaget, 1885)
- Halipeurus angusticeps (Piaget, 1880)
- Halipeurus atlanticus Palma, 2011
- Halipeurus attenuatus Edwards, 1961
- Halipeurus bulweriae Timmermann, 1960
- Halipeurus confusus Palma, 2011
- Halipeurus consimilis Timmermann, 1960
- Halipeurus diversus (Kellogg, 1896)
- Halipeurus fallacis Timmermann, 1960
- Halipeurus falsus Eichler, 1949
- Halipeurus forficulatus Edwards, 1961
- Halipeurus gravis Timmermann, 1961
- Halipeurus heraldicus Timmermann, 1960
- Halipeurus kermadecensis (Johnston & Harrison, 1912)
- Halipeurus leucophryna Timmermann, 1960
- Halipeurus marquesanus (Ferris, 1932)
- Halipeurus mirabilis Thompson, 1940
- Halipeurus mundae Edwards, 1961
- Halipeurus nesofregettae Timmermann, 1961
- Halipeurus noctivagus Timmermann, 1960
- Halipeurus pelagicus (Denny, 1842)
- Halipeurus pelagodromae Palma, 2011
- Halipeurus placodus Edwards, 1961
- Halipeurus priapulud Timmermann, 1961
- Halipeurus pricei Palma, 2011
- Halipeurus procellariae (Fabricius, 1775)
- Halipeurus raphanus Timmermann, 1961
- Halipeurus sawadai Nakagawa, 1959
- Halipeurus spadix Timmermann, 1961
- Halipeurus theresae Timmermann, 1969
- Halipeurus thompsoni Edwards, 1961
- Halipeurus turtur Edwards, 1961
- Halipeurus vincesmithi Palma, 2011
