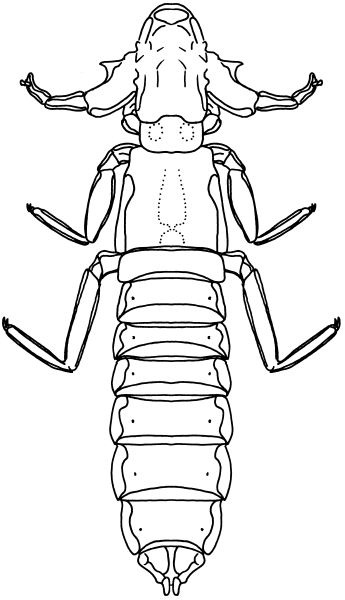
- Harrisoniella hopkinsi

Scientific classification
- Kingdom: Animalia
- Phylum: Arthropoda
- Clade: Pancrustacea
- Class: Insecta
- Order: Psocodea
- Infraorder: Phthiraptera
- Family: Philopteridae
- Genus: Harrisoniella
- Species: H. hopkinsi

Binomial name
- Harrisoniella hopkinsi Eichler, 1952

= Harrisoniella hopkinsi =

Species of louse

Harrisoniella hopkinsi is a species of phtilopterid louse that lives on and eats the feathers of albatrosses. The species was first described by W. Eichler in 1952.

This species is dark brown with an elongated head, and extremely large – H. hopkinsi is one of the largest feather lice, with males reaching up to 9 millimetres (0.35 in) long. They live mostly on the wing feathers, but are quite able to move if disturbed or if their host bird should die. There are usually fewer than half a dozen adult specimens found on a single host bird; low compared with other species of feather lice, which may number in the hundreds. Harrisoniella hopkinsi has been found on the feathers of the wandering albatross (Diomedea exulans) and the southern royal albatross (Diomedea epomophora).
