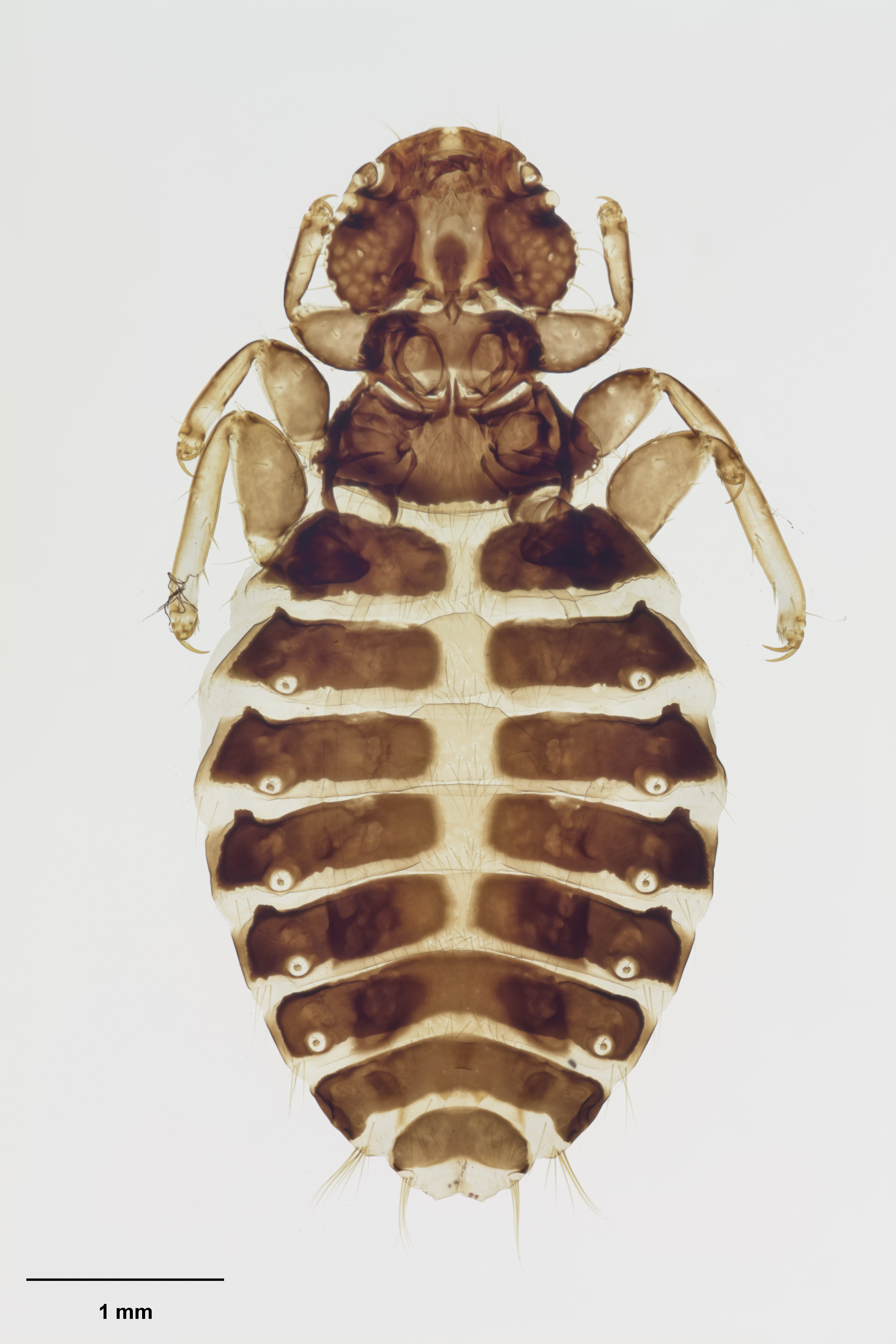
- Nesiotinus demersus MA 1374863

Scientific classification
- Domain: Eukaryota
- Kingdom: Animalia
- Phylum: Arthropoda
- Class: Insecta
- Order: Psocodea
- Family: Philopteridae
- Genus: Nesiotinus; Kellog, 1903

Type species
- Nesiotinus demersus Kellog, 1903

= Nesiotinus =

Genus of lice

Nesiotinus is a genus of lice belonging to the family Philopteridae. The genus was first described in 1903 by Vernon Lyman Kellogg, and the type species is Nesiotinus demersus.

The species of this genus are found infesting King Penguins.

== Species ==
Species:

- Nesiotinus demersus Kellogg, 1903
- Nesiotinus kerguelensis Mey, 2010
