= Columbicola =

Scientific classification
- Kingdom: Animalia
- Phylum: Arthropoda
- Clade: Pancrustacea
- Class: Insecta
- Order: Psocodea
- Infraorder: Phthiraptera
- Family: Philopteridae
- Genus: Columbicola; Ewing, 1929

Genus of lice

Columbicola is a genus of lice belonging to the family Philopteridae.

The species of this genus are found in Europe, Northern America, Southeastern Asia and Australia.

== Species ==
Species:

- Columbicola adamsi Clayton & Price, 1999
- Columbicola altamimiae Clayton & Price, 1999
- Columbicola asukae Gustafsson, Tsurumi & Bush, 2015
- Columbicola columbae (Linnaeus, 1758)
- Columbicola extinctus Malcomson, 1937
