= Saemundssonia =

Scientific classification
- Domain: Eukaryota
- Kingdom: Animalia
- Phylum: Arthropoda
- Class: Insecta
- Order: Psocodea
- Family: Philopteridae
- Genus: Saemundssonia; Timmermann, 1956

Species
- around 100 described species and subspecies

Genus of lice

Saemundssonia is a genus of chewing lice belonging to the family Philopteridae. These lice are parasitic on aquatic birds, especially on members of the order Charadriiformes, but also on Anseriformes, Gruiformes, Pelecaniformes and Procellariiformes. Members of this genus have a broad triangular head bearing a frontal plate with a dark backwards-pointing projection.

== Species ==
Species include:

- S. acutipecta
- S. boschi
- S. calva
- S. celidoxa
- S. fraterculae
- S. grylle
- S. insolita
- S. laticaudata
- S. merguli
- S. montereyi
- S. wumisuzume
