= Naubates =

Scientific classification
- Domain: Eukaryota
- Kingdom: Animalia
- Phylum: Arthropoda
- Class: Insecta
- Order: Psocodea
- Family: Philopteridae
- Genus: Naubates; Bedford, 1930

Genus of insects

Naubates is a genus of lice belonging to the family Philopteridae.

The species of this genus are found in Australia and New Zealand.

Species:

- Naubates clypeatus (Giebel, 1874)
- Naubates damma Timmermann, 1961
