= Philopteroides xenicus =

Scientific classification
- Kingdom: Animalia
- Phylum: Arthropoda
- Clade: Pancrustacea
- Class: Insecta
- Order: Psocodea
- Infraorder: Phthiraptera
- Family: Philopteridae
- Genus: Philopteroides
- Species: P. xenicus

Binomial name
- Philopteroides xenicus Mey, 2004

Extinct avian parasitic louse species

Philopteroides xenicus, also known as the bushwren louse, is an extinct avian parasitic louse species of the genus Philopteroides. It was known to have lived on the bushwren, so it went co-extinct with the bushwren in the mid 1900s.
