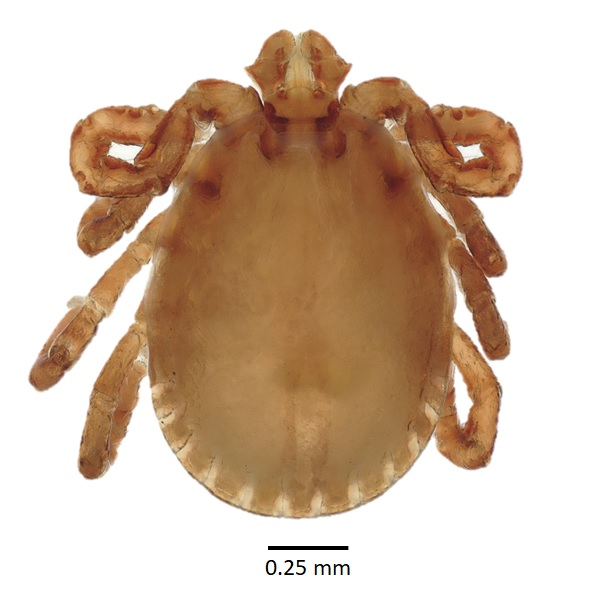

Scientific classification
- Kingdom: Animalia
- Phylum: Arthropoda
- Subphylum: Chelicerata
- Class: Arachnida
- Order: Ixodida
- Family: Ixodidae
- Genus: Haemaphysalis
- Species: H. pentalagi

Binomial name
- Haemaphysalis pentalagi Pospelova-Shtrom, 1935

= Haemaphysalis pentalagi =

Species of tick

Haemaphysalis pentalagi, the Ryukyu rabbit tick, is an endangered species endemic to Japan where it is only known from Amami Ōshima, an island in the Ryukyu archipelago. It is a host specific parasite of the Amami rabbit (Pentalagus furnessi) which is endemic to the islands of Amami Ōshima and Tokunoshima. Due to its host-specific relationship with the endangered Amami rabbit, it is considered a co-endangered species.

The Ryukyu rabbit tick was originally described and named in 1935 based on a single male specimen. Full descriptions of the male, female, nymphal and larval stages were published in April 1970 in the Journal of Parasitology by Harry Hoogstraal and Noboru Yamagutit.

The Ryukyu rabbit tick is the subject of the first dedicated conservation program for a globally threatened parasite which began in 2022. This program involves both in-situ monitoring of wild populations of this tick and ex-situ captive breeding of an insurance population in the event that the species becomes extinct in the wild.
