= Harrisoniella =

Scientific classification
- Domain: Eukaryota
- Kingdom: Animalia
- Phylum: Arthropoda
- Class: Insecta
- Order: Psocodea
- Family: Philopteridae
- Genus: Harrisoniella; Bedford, 1929

Genus of insects

Harrisoniella is a genus of insects belonging to the family Philopteridae.

The species of this genus are found in Australia and Southernmost America.

Species:

- Harrisoniella copei Timmermann, 1969
- Harrisoniella densa (Kellogg, 1896)
- Harrisoniella ferox (Giebel, 1867)
- Harrisoniella hopkinsi Eichler, 1952
