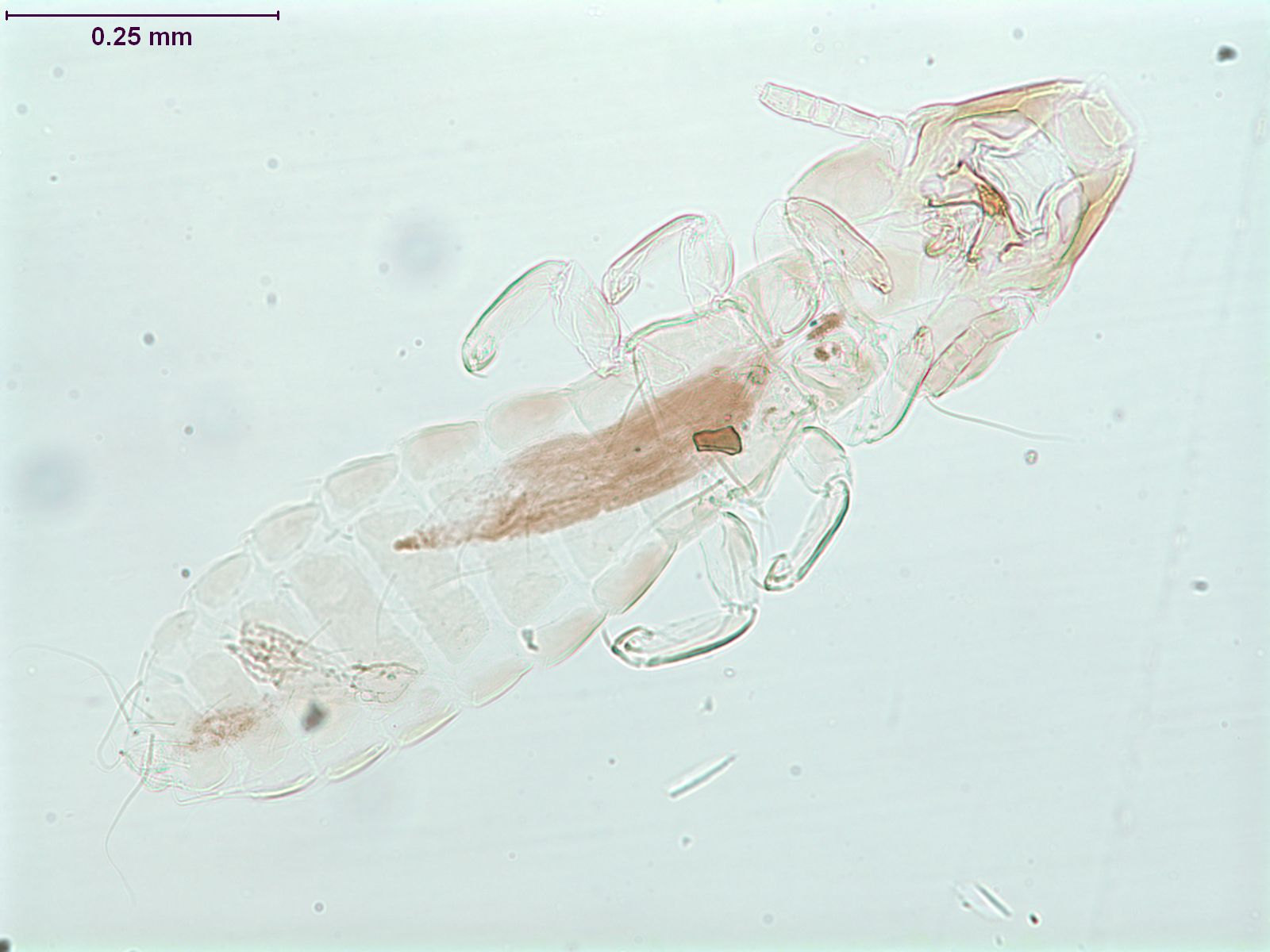
- Q. separatus

Scientific classification
- Kingdom: Animalia
- Phylum: Arthropoda
- Class: Insecta
- Order: Psocodea
- Infraorder: Phthiraptera
- Family: Philopteridae
- Genus: Quadraceps; T. Clay & R. Meinertzhagen, 1939

Type species
- Philopterus (Nirmus) vanelli Denny, 1842

= Quadraceps =

Genus of lice

Quadraceps is a genus of louse. They are ectoparasites of birds in the order Charadriiformes, and the genus was circumscribed in 1939 by Theresa Clay and Richard Meinertzhagen. Infestation is believed to increase the rate of nest desertion, lowers the success rate of baby birds hatching, reduces the number of birds in the clutch, and cause birds to attract fewer mates. All in all, the survival of the nestlings is lowered drastically.

== Species ==
Species include:

- Quadraceps charadrii (Linnaeus, 1758)
- Quadraceps hopkinsi Timmermann, 1952
- Quadraceps neoaustralis Emerson & Price, 1986
- Quadraceps separatus (Kellogg & Kuwana, 1902)
