= Coloceras restinctus =

Scientific classification
- Kingdom: Animalia
- Phylum: Arthropoda
- Clade: Pancrustacea
- Class: Insecta
- Order: Psocodea
- Infraorder: Phthiraptera
- Family: Philopteridae
- Genus: Coloceras
- Species: C. restinctus

Binomial name
- Coloceras restinctus (Tendeiro, 1972)

Synonyms
- Patellinirmus restinctus Tendeiro, 1972

Species of louse

Coloceras restinctus is a species of feather louse.
