= Anaticola =

Scientific classification
- Domain: Eukaryota
- Kingdom: Animalia
- Phylum: Arthropoda
- Class: Insecta
- Order: Psocodea
- Family: Philopteridae
- Genus: Anaticola; Clay, 1935

Genus of lice

Anaticola is a genus of lice belonging to the family Philopteridae, which was first described in 1935 by Theresa Clay.

The species of this genus are found in Europe and New Zealand.

Species:

- Anaticola angustolimbatus (Giebel, 1866)
- Anaticola anseris (Linnaeus, 1758)
- Anaticola asymmetricus (Rudow, 1869)
- Anaticola australis (Rudow, 1869)
- Anaticola beieri Eichler, 1954
- Anaticola branderi Eichler & Hackman, 1973
- Anaticola breviceps (Piaget, 1888)
- Anaticola buccinator Eichler, 1980
- Anaticola cairinensis (Monteiro de Barros, 1933)
- Anaticola candidus (Rudow, 1869)
- Anaticola chaetodens Eichler, 1954
- Anaticola clangulae (O.Fabricius, 1780)
- Anaticola coloratus (Piaget, 1880)
- Anaticola constrictus (Kellogg, 1896)
- Anaticola crassicornis (Scopoli, 1763)
- Anaticola cygnopsis (Rudow, 1869)
- Anaticola delacouri Eichler, 1954
- Anaticola dissonus Tandan & Brelih, 1971
- Anaticola ernstmayri Eichler, 1954
- Anaticola gambensis (Piaget, 1885)
- Anaticola jamesi T.Clay, 1974
- Anaticola klockenhoffi Eichler, 1980
- Anaticola magnificus Ansari, 1955
- Anaticola marginella (Piaget, 1885)
- Anaticola megaceros (T.H.Johnston & L.Harrison, 1912)
- Anaticola mergiserrati (de Geer, 1778)
- Anaticola parviceps (Piaget, 1880)
- Anaticola phoenicopteri (Coinde, 1859)
- Anaticola pseudofuligulae Eichler & Vasjukova, 1980
- Anaticola rheinwaldi Eichler & Vasjukova, 1980
- Anaticola tadornae (Denny, 1842)
- Anaticola tamarae Eichler, 1981
- Anaticola thoracicus (Piaget, 1880)
- Anaticola tordae (T.Muller, 1927)
