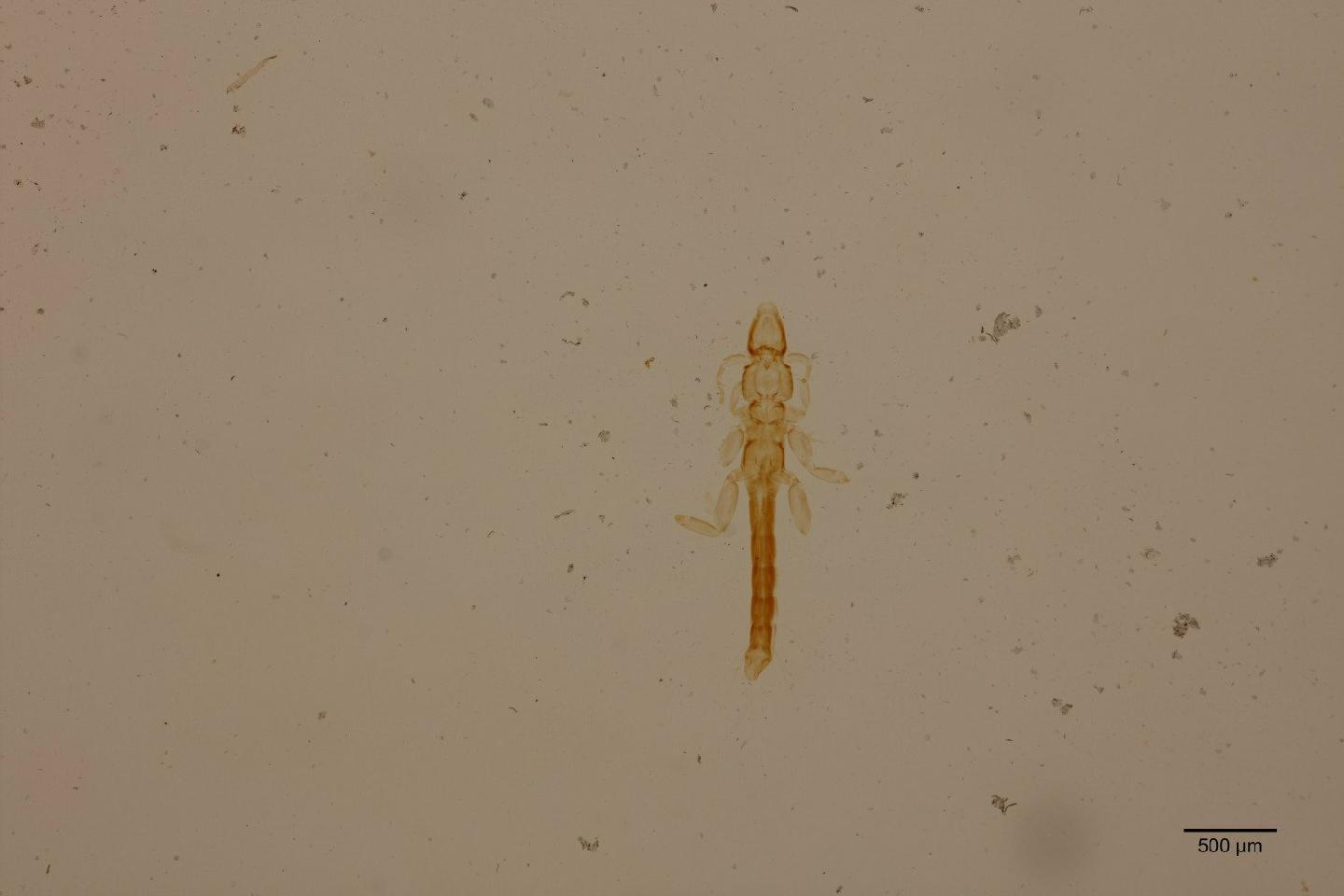

Scientific classification
- Kingdom: Animalia
- Phylum: Arthropoda
- Clade: Pancrustacea
- Class: Insecta
- Order: Psocodea
- Infraorder: Phthiraptera
- Family: Philopteridae
- Genus: Columbicola
- Species: C. extinctus

Binomial name
- Columbicola extinctus Malcomson, 1937

= Columbicola extinctus =

Species of louse

Columbicola extinctus, also known as the passenger pigeon chewing louse, is a species of philopterid louse. It was once believed to have become extinct with its only known host, the passenger pigeon (Ectopistes migratorius), prior to its rediscovery living on band-tailed pigeons (Patagioenas fasciata).

== Taxonomy ==
The generic name Columbicola comes from the Latin words columba, "dove", and -cola, "inhabitant", in reference to the genus's primary hosts.

Columbicola extinctus was originally described by Richard O. Malcomson in 1937. It was originally believed to have only lived on the passenger pigeon, which had been extinct for 23 years by the time of its discovery. Malcomson believed that Columbicola extinctus had become extinct with its host and gave it the specific name extinctus to mark this fact. However, by 1999 Columbicola extinctus had been rediscovered living on the band-tailed pigeon, which, along with the other species of Patagioenas, are the passenger pigeon's closest living relatives in North America.

== Description ==
Like other members of the genus Columbicola, the insect is a long, slender louse that shows marked sexual dimorphism in the antennae, as the male's are much longer than those of the female in the third segment. It is between 2.15 and 2.47 mm (0.085 and 0.097 in) long overall. The male's head is between 0.52 and 0.59 mm (0.020 and 0.023 in) long and broadens to form a slight shoulder at the anterior plate. The female's head is slightly larger at 0.53 to 0.64 mm (0.021 to 0.025 in). The thorax has two very long setae on each side.

== Distribution ==
While the precise range of Columbicola extinctus is not known, it is only known to live on one extant host, the band-tailed pigeon, and has been found on individuals across its range. The band-tailed pigeon lives along the Pacific coast of North America from southern British Columbia to northern Baja California. It is also found in the southern Rocky Mountains of Utah and Colorado south down the center of the continent through Central America and into South America. While its other known host, the passenger pigeon, was extant, the louse could also be found in eastern North America from southern Canada south to the Gulf Coast and northern Florida; due to the passenger pigeon's extinction, the louse is now extirpated from the eastern side of the continent.

== Ecology ==
Columbicola extinctus feeds on the feathers and skin debris of their host. Their elongated shape allow them to conceal themselves between feather shafts and therefore avoid dislodgement while its host is preening or in flight. They spend their entire life on a host pigeon, and can only be transferred from one pigeon to another when the pigeons come in contact. These lice lay their eggs in parts of the body inaccessible to preening, such as the interior of feather shafts. Columbicola extinctus is an exopterygote and is born as a miniature version of the adult that is known as nymph. The nymphs molt three times before reaching the final adult form, usually within a month of hatching.
