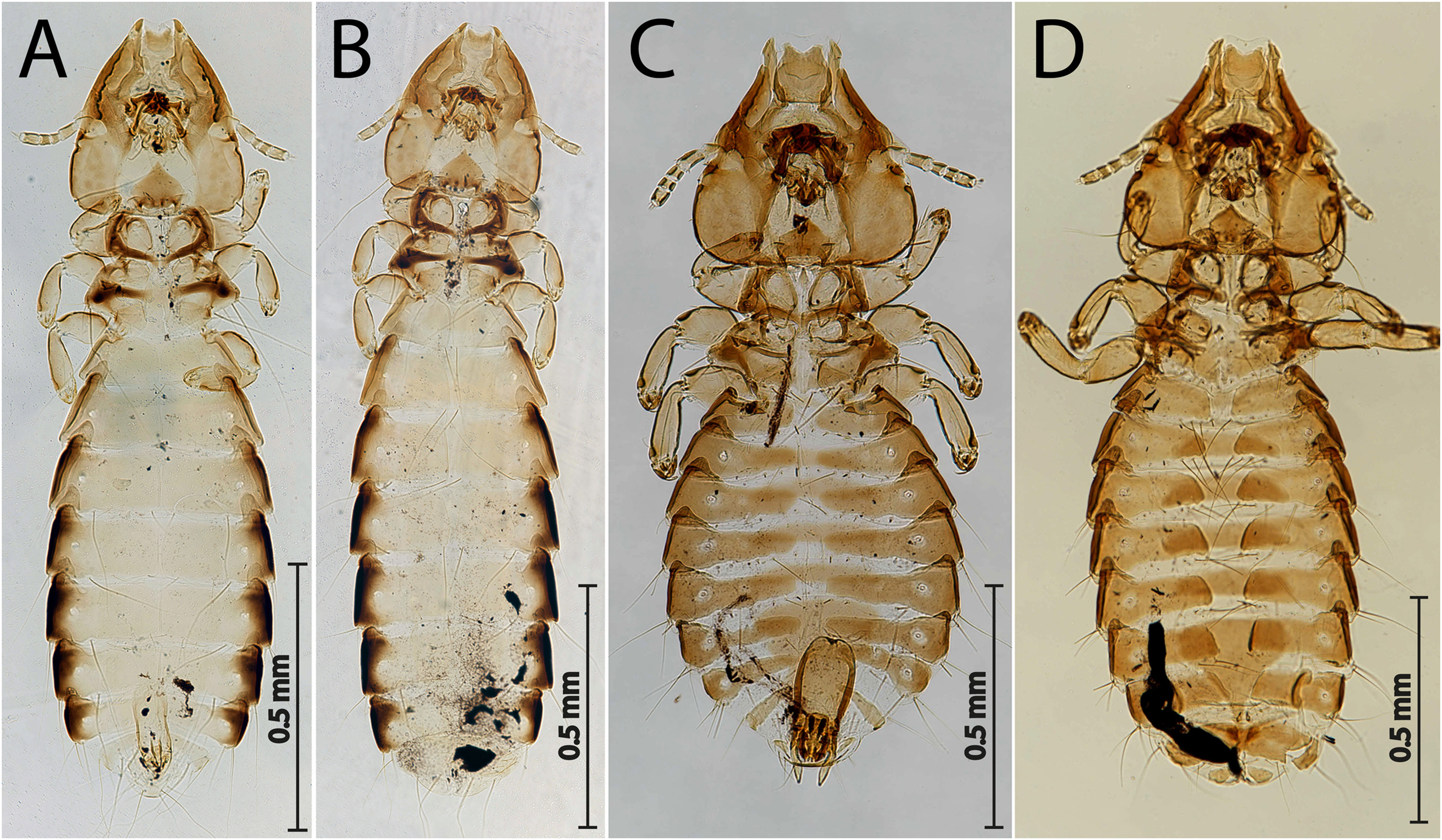
- Guimaraesiella tovornikae and Sturnidoecus sp., parasites of birds

Scientific classification
- Kingdom: Animalia
- Phylum: Arthropoda
- Clade: Pancrustacea
- Class: Insecta
- Order: Psocodea
- Suborder: Troctomorpha
- Infraorder: Phthiraptera
- Parvorder: Ischnocera
- Family: Philopteridae; Nitzsch, 1818

Type genus
- Philopterus Nitzsch, 1818

Genera
- Numerous, see text

= Philopteridae =

Family of lice

Philopteridae is a family of feather lice. They are parasitic on birds, primarily consuming downy feathers.

Philopteridae is a highly diverse family with more than 2,700 described species, and constitutes 30% of the order Psocodea, half of all described Phthiraptera (lice), and the majority of parvorder Ischnocera. Most bird groups are infested with members of this family. Different species show convergent morphology, converging on one of a few forms, depending on which area of the host they hide in.

== Classification ==
The family Philopteridae belongs to the parvorder Ischnocera, of the larger infraorder Phthiraptera, which includes all lice. It was named as a family by Christian Ludwig Nitzsch in 1818. A cladogram showing the position of Philopteridae within Phthiraptera and Psocodea is shown below:

- Psocodea
  - - Troctomorpha
      - - - Phthiraptera
            - - Philopteridae
              - - - Anoplura
                  - Rhynchophthirina
                - Trichodectidae
            - Amblycera
          - Liposcelididae
        - - Pachytroctidae
          - Sphaeropsocidae
      - Amphientometae
    - Psocomorpha
      - - - Homilopsocidea
          - Caeciliusetae
        - - - Psocetae
            - Epipsocetae
          - Philotarsetae
      - Archipsocetae
  - Trogiomorpha
    - - Atropetae
      - Psyllipsocetae
    - Prionoglaridetae (paraphyletic)

Over 2,700 species of Philopteridae have been described, making up 30% of species described in the order Psocodea, around half of species described in infraorder Phthiraptera (and therefore half of all lice species), and the majority of species described in the parvorder Ischnocera. They likely evolved from a generalist species parasitizing water birds. The diversification of the family followed adaptive radiation of their water bird hosts, with the origin of the family estimated to have occurred around 49 million years ago. Individual species within the family show convergent morphology, with many showing specialization in inhabiting different parts of the body.

== Characteristics ==
All chewing lice, including Philopteridae, are wingless insects with flattened bodies and shortened front legs. Philopteridae specifically have mandibles that move in the horizontal plane and exposed antennae. All species of Philopteridae exclusively parasitize birds, with the exception of Trichophilopterus babakotophilus, which parasitizes lemurs.

Species within Philopteridae have undergone convergent evolution, with different adaptations in response preening behaviors by their bird hosts. To evade preening, many species have converged on three main forms, each corresponding to hiding in a different location on the host. These are the wing form, which is long and slender, allowing lice to hide between wing feathers; the head louse form, with a triangular grooved head to attach to head feathers; and the body louse form, with a plump abdomen with round head margin to hide in the downy feathers on the body of the bird.

Members of Philopteridae almost exclusively consume downy feathers, as opposed to Amblycera bird lice, which additionally consume skin debris and other secretions.

=== Life cycle ===
All lice are hemimetabolous, with three instars as developmental phases. Most individuals remain on a single host across the entire life cycle, with transfers between hosts occurring rarely and requiring close contact between hosts. The details of timing of the stages in the life cycle have only been characterized for a few species. For those lice which it has been determined, the eggs hatch in 5-7 days, and each instar takes somewhere between 6 and 14 days.

Philopteridae rarely move around their host, remaining immobile for large parts of their lives, and are less likely than other bird lice to abandon their host upon death.

== Ecology ==
Most extant bird groups are infested with Philopteridae, with a notable exception being hummingbirds.

== Effects ==
Heavy infestation by Philopteridae can cause restlessness and debility. While not ordinarily responsible for deaths of their hosts, they sometimes cause the death of chicks. Chickens infested heavily with Lipeurus will scratch intensely, breaking skin and causing themselves to bleed.

== Genera ==
Species inhabiting the same part of the host tend to show similar morphology, even if not closely related – they show convergent evolution - making morphological classification of the family difficult. Because of this, there is not yet a recognized subdivision of the family into subfamilies or tribes.

Notable genera with articles are listed below.

- Acidoproctus
- Anaticola
- Brueelia
- Campanulotes
- Columbicola
  - Columbicola extinctus
- Coloceras
  - Coloceras hemiphagae
  - Coloceras restinctus
- Halipeurus
- Harrisoniella
  - Harrisoniella hopkinsi
- Naubates
- Nesiotinus
- Quadraceps
- Rallicola Johnston & Harrison, 1911
  - Rallicola extinctus
- Saemundssonia
- Strigiphilus
  - Strigiphilus garylarsoni
