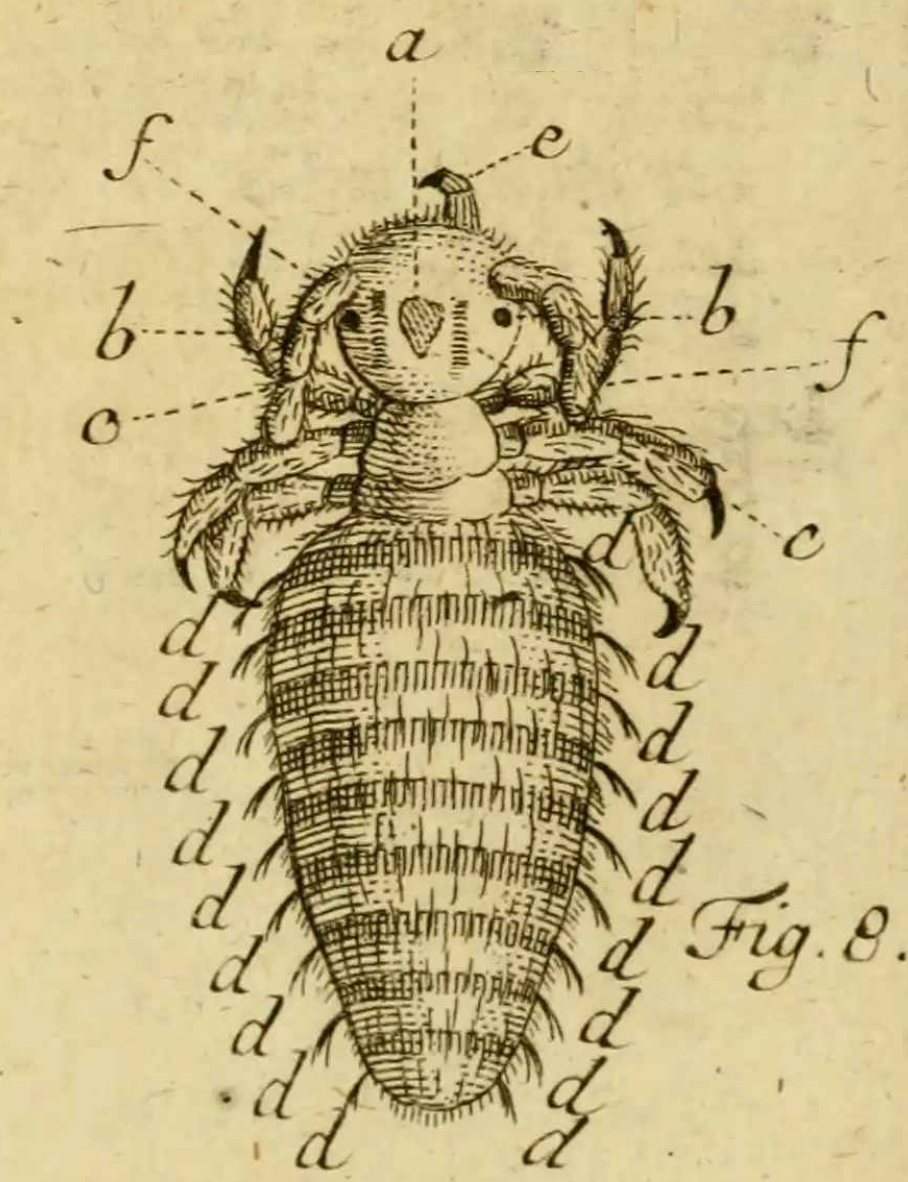

Scientific classification
- Kingdom: Animalia
- Phylum: Arthropoda
- Clade: Pancrustacea
- Class: Insecta
- Order: Psocodea
- Infraorder: Phthiraptera
- Family: Trichodectidae
- Genus: Bovicola
- Species: B. ovis

Binomial name
- Bovicola ovis (Schrank, 1781)

= Bovicola ovis =

Species of louse

Bovicola ovis, the sheep body louse, is a chewing louse that afflicts sheep across the world. It belongs to the order Phthiraptera, the parvorder Trichodectera, and the genus Bovicola. It spreads from sheep to sheep via direct contact of fleeces, and lives on their skin and wool. It does not pierce the skin to drink blood; rather, it feeds on hair and oil secretions, loose skin flakes, and epidermal debris at the base of the wool. As obligate parasites, lice do not survive long anywhere other than a sheep body. They generally have a reddish-brown head and a pale cream-colored or yellow-colored body. Adults gain brown stripes swathed across their body. Lice are small, measuring just 1.5 to 2 millimeters (0.06 to 0.08 inches) across as adults.

Infested sheep are irritated by the lice and will attempt to scratch their itching fleece, damaging it. While infested sheep will not generally be at risk of severe health complications, an infestation reduces both wool yield and value.

== Classification ==
Franz von Paula Schrank identified the louse and classified it as Pediculus ovis in 1781. Later scientific literature divided chewing or biting lice from sucking lice, and the species was known as Trichodectes ovis and later Damalinia ovis. Further analysis by Chris Lyal in 1985 reclassified various species within the genus Damalinia as members of Bovicola, including B. ovis.

== History and habitat ==
Sheep body lice have existed for a long time, and have a cosmopolitan distribution across the entire Earth, wherever sheep are found. Archaeological excavations in Essex found a watering hole from the era of Roman Britain with a well-preserved Bovicola ovis specimen, suggesting close proximity to a structure that cleaned and/or processed fleeces and wool. Bovicola ovis has been found preserved even in hostile locations such as chilly Greenland during the era of Norse settlements in Greenland (c. 990–1350).

They exist across the world today, although estimates on how common they are cover a wide range. One 2010 publication suggested that between 35% and 70% of sheep-holding properties in Australia had sheep body lice. A 2020 study of sheep in Oromia, Ethiopia found that 42% of examined sheep were infested.

More locally, lice prefer to live on the wooly sides and back of a sheep, and avoid the belly.

== Biology ==
Sheep body lice are chewing lice, also known as biting lice. They are small, measuring just 1.5 to 2 millimeters (0.06 to 0.08 inches) as adults. Females are larger than males. Sheep body lice are obligate parasites of sheep and cannot live anywhere else for long. They feed on hair and lipid secretions, dandruff or scurf (loose skin flakes), and other debris at the corneum of the sheep's skin. As they age, brown stripes appear on their abdomen.

== Growth, development, and reproduction ==
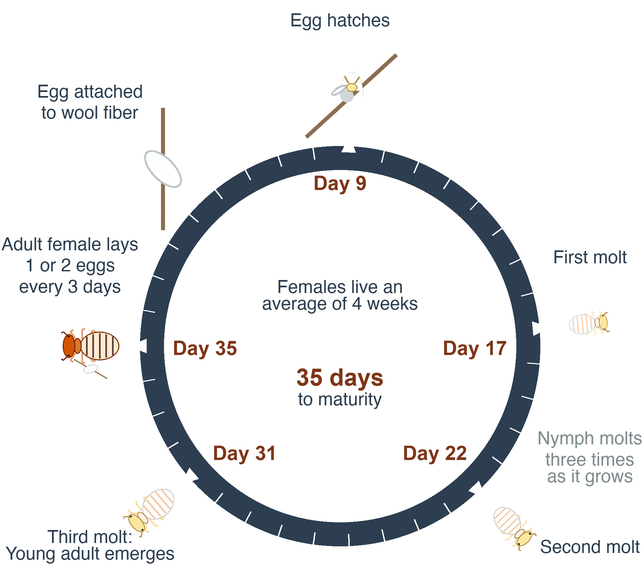
Lifecycle of Bovicola ovis, the sheep body louse

The average lifespan of Bovicola ovis is about forty-two days. A new louse spends around nine days in an egg (or nit). Gender balance is roughly equal. After hatching, there are three instar forms of the nymph as the organism molts and grows. During the nymph stage, the transverse stripes on the abdomen do not yet exist, and the nymphs are pale yellow or cream. The instars last around 7, 5, and 9 days, although this can vary. Upon adulthood, lice promptly seek out mating within hours. Females will wait 3–4 days to begin to lay eggs. Unlike some other lice (such as Bovicola bovis), mating between males and females is required to produce fertile eggs; females are not parthenogenetic. (Note: Sources conflict; one textbook admits that parthenogenetic behavior has not been directly observed, but suggests it might be happening anyway.) B. ovis females will lay around 1 or 2 eggs every three days. After one to three weeks, females become infertile and die. Males generally live longer. The eggs hatch and the cycle repeats.

Lice populations are affected by seasons and temperature. A 1998 American study found that they were the highest in the spring, and lowest in the summer; this finding was on unsheared sheep protected from rain, so is independent of human shearing practices and rainfall. Too much water is harmful to their health. If completely submerged in water, B. ovis will die within an hour. In a heavily moist environment, such as a wet fleece with humidity at 90% or above – such as might happen during prolonged, heavy rainfall – B. ovis will die after 6 hours.

One estimate suggested that a population of 5,000 B. ovis lice on a sheep could increase to 500,000 over the course of 20 weeks, if conditions are favorable.

== Effects ==
The effects of B. ovis on its host are negative, but not life-threatening.

=== Host sheep's health ===
The presence of the louse causes sheep to become itchy, triggering pruritic behavior where the sheep attempts to rub, scratch, or bite their irritable fleece. This behavior is the main part of what causes damage to the wool; it is not solely the lice directly.

=== Economic effects ===
An infestation of body lice can reduce both the amount and the quality of wool. One estimate suggested a loss of perhaps 1 kg per head, while another suggested a decline in greasy wool production of 15–30%, depending on severity. Heavily infested wool becomes matted and yellow, which sells for less and is more likely to be lost or destroyed in processing. Lice can also reduce the value of sheepskins sold for sheep leather, as the skin can become lumpy and discolored. The lumps are known as "cockle".

A 2015 study suggested that the existence of sheep body lice cost the Australian sheep industry 81 million Australian dollars annually.

== Spread and control ==
Lice spread near-exclusively from sheep-to-sheep close contact. (Note: Rarely, Bovicola ovis can survive on goats for a few weeks, but they are not believed likely to re-infest sheep, even in a mixed sheep–goat environment. Infested sheep wool caught on fences or other fleece-height structures are hypothetically possible to host lice, but lice don't survive long in such a scenario, dropping out within hours, rendering this an unlikely method of spread.) An uninfected flock will stay lice-free without outside intervention. A single infested sheep will slowly infest the rest of the flock, given time. Animal husbandry practices that pack sheep in even more tightly than natural flocks – such as crowded pens – will result in faster spread. Heavily infested sheep also spread faster, while a mild infestation may take many contacts before spreading to a new sheep. Lambs are more susceptible to becoming infested from contact than adult sheep.

It is recommended that when a holder acquires sheep that they promptly shear and treat the newcomers before allowing them to mix with the rest of the flock. Similarly, when agisting unknown sheep on a property that already contains a flock known to be uninfected, they should either be kept separate, or sheared and treated before mixing with each other. Defective fencing can also cause a clean flock to become infested if a lousy stray sheep comes on the property to mix, or a held sheep briefly escapes to explore, meets lousy sheep, then returns. Another potential avenue of spread are rent-a-ram agreements, where a ewe-only flock has rams from an unknown flock brought in to service them.

If a flock is already infested, the general recommendation to cure it is to wait for the next sheep shearing, then apply "backliners" (chemicals) that kill the lice. While lice spread more easily when sheep wool is shorter, chemical treatments are more effective on shorn sheep, and the very act of shearing will kill a large number of lice. This is not fully reliable, as incorrect use of backliners and underdosing have led to selection for chemical-resistant strains of lice. If a backliner treatment was properly applied yet failed anyway, this can mean that a different chemical should be tried the next shearing.

Increasing resistance to insect growth regulators among lice resulted in a collapse in their use; one study found that 93% of anti-lice treatments in Australia used them in 2003, but this fell to 51% in 2011 and a mere 3% in 2018. Ivermectin has been tried as an experiment, but cleared only 81% of the lice in an evaluation in Ethiopia, an insufficient amount compared to a desired 98%+. Examples of recommended products include the organophosphate temefos, spinosad, and neonicotinoids.

Attempting to treat sheep without shearing them is sometimes done as a stopgap to mitigate damage to fleeces, but is unlikely to fully destroy an infestation, so is not recommended. Additionally, some insecticides cause environmental damage as effluent and runoff. Chemical treatments also mandate withholding periods where the wool cannot be sold nor can the sheep be slaughtered for meat. Waiting to apply the treatment post-shearing means that a much smaller amount of chemicals are required to treat the remaining wool. This minimizes residues released into the environment, increases confidence that all the lice are dead, and makes it unlikely the withholding period will matter given that there's a delay before the sheep is shorn again anyway.

== Other kinds of sheep lice ==
Bovicola ovis is the most prominent and economically significant variety of lice that live on sheep, but sheep are hosts to other species of louse. The sheep foot louse, Linognathus pedalis, is found on the legs and feet, while the sheep face louse, Linognathus ovillus, mainly lives on or close to the face. Both of these are sucking lice (Anoplura) that feed on blood. They are also bluish in color, unlike B. ovis. More rarely, lice that live on goats can infest other small ruminants like sheep or alpacas; these include Linognathus africanus and Bovicola caprae.
