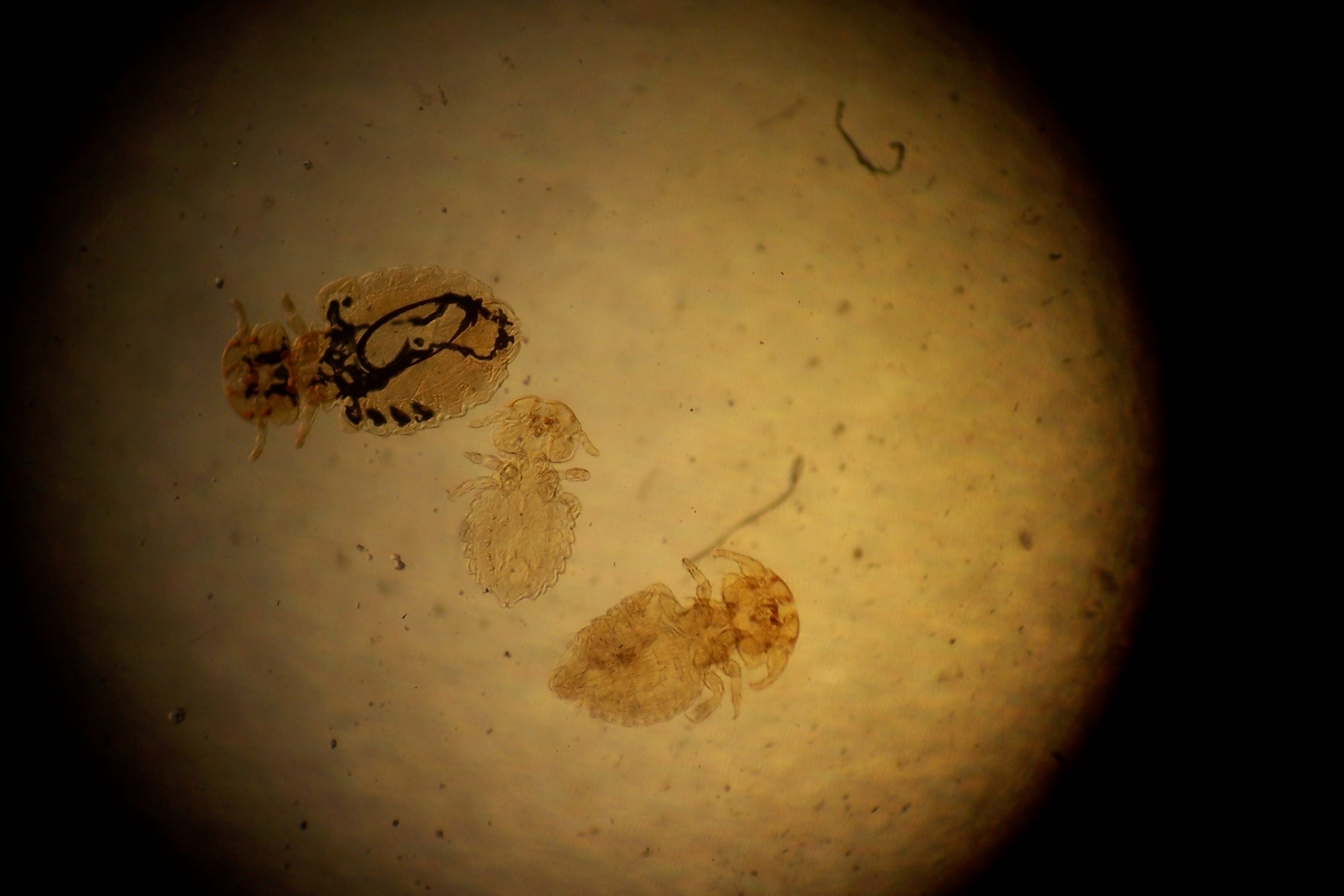

Scientific classification
- Kingdom: Animalia
- Phylum: Arthropoda
- Clade: Pancrustacea
- Class: Insecta
- Order: Psocodea
- Infraorder: Phthiraptera
- Family: Trichodectidae
- Genus: Trichodectes
- Species: T. canis

Binomial name
- Trichodectes canis (De Geer, 1818)

= Trichodectes canis =

Species of louse

Trichodectes canis, also known as canine chewing louse, is a chewing louse found on domesticated dogs and wild canids throughout the world. T. canis is a well-known vector for the dog tapeworm, Dipylidium caninum. T. canis usually does not present any major problems to the host, however, can be very irritating in heavy infestations. In North America and most developed countries, T. canis infestation of domesticated dogs is very uncommon as long as they are properly cared for and healthy. Poorly taken care of dogs are more prone to getting a lice infestation.

== Description ==
Trichodectes canis is a louse of the suborder Mallophaga, or chewing lice. T. canis is a small, flat-bodied louse. Males are typically smaller than females, with body lengths ranging from 1.60 to 1.68 mm in males and 1.75 to 1.82 mm in females. Females also differ from males in the fact that they possess a special organ that is located from underneath the end of the abdomen. This organ, when seen from above, resembles two bowed appendages on either side of the genital region. This organ serves two purposes – in helping to glue the eggs to hosts' fur, and to grasp fur in order to remain on the host. As a member of the genus Trichodectes, T. canis usually have antennae with three segments and a single claw at each tarsus. The mouthparts of the T. canis include a pair of mandibles lacking the maxillary palps. In addition, T. canis possess a pair of degenerate eyes and hair-like appendages from their antennae that function for perception. Other physical features include being ectothermic, possessing bilateral symmetry, and polymorphic.

== Distribution and habitat ==
Trichodectes canis, known for their ability to tolerate extremes in temperature, are found in many different regions worldwide. T. canis was originally found on domesticated dogs in the Czech Republic in the 1950s. However, this louse has been found on wild canines as well – on gray wolves in Canada (1934), and coyotes in Texas and Kansas (1959). In addition to the domestic dog, T. canis is known to inhabit C. lupus, C. aureus, C. latrans, Dusicyonculpaeus, Cerdocyonthous, Vulpesbengalensis and Viverracivetta as well. T. canis is understood to have been brought to Australia with the domesticated dog. T. canis is said to be a major ectoparasite of domesticated dogs in colder regions such as Scandinavia because the environment is too harsh to foster the growth of other ectoparasites such as ticks or fleas.

Trichodectes canis lives in temperate, terrestrial, and tropical habitats, both urban and suburban. T. canis lives all stages of life on the host. Therefore, T. canis is known as a permanent parasite. T. canis is known to live on domesticated dogs, but also several other hosts:

- C. lupus
- C. aureus
- C. latrans
- Dusicyonculpaeus
- Cerdocyonthous
- Vulpesbengalensis
- Viverracivetta

It has also been noted that T. canis is more likely to choose hosts who are older, younger, or otherwise unhealthy. T. canis is known to prefer to inhabit the back, neck, and head of the host. Transmission of T. canis to domesticated cats or humans is not expected to occur.

== Development ==
After laying the nits (eggs), the female glues each to a single hair on the host. After five to eight days, the nits hatch from the egg as the larva push the covering of the nit open (the operculum) when parting from the egg. Females lay up to 100 nits at a time. There are three molts that occur, each nymph resembling the adult but with increasing size. The third nymph then becomes a mature adult. The life cycle of T. canis occurs within three to five weeks, occurring entirely on the host. The longevity of T. canis is unknown, however, females are thought to live longer than males.

== Reproduction ==
Currently, little is known regarding the mating systems for Trichodectes canis. Mating is believed to ensue year-round. The male initiates the mating process by positioning himself under the female and lifting his genitals up towards the female. T. canis has no parental involvement.

== Behavior ==
Although Trichodectes canis is a permanent parasite, males may be more mobile than females in regards to leaving the host. T. canis exhibits high preference for hosts within the canine species, however, appears to have no real preference for different species of canines. When inhabiting hosts that are unhealthy or live in the wilderness, T. canis is able to build up large populations. However, domesticated dogs do not usually build up these large infestations. T. canis has several adaptations that better suit it to being a permanent parasite. The females' modified legs, mandibles, and abdominal appendages allow them to grip to fur easily. T. canis tend to move much slower than human lice, and may appear almost motionless.

== Feeding ==
Trichodectes canis survives by consuming flakes of skin and fluids produced by their canine hosts' skin. T. canis' modified mouthparts including mandibles with no maxillary palps are used to scrape the hosts' skin to feed.

== Role in the ecosystem ==
Trichodectes canis may cause the host to become stressed, resulting in an increased risk of contracting infectious diseases. T. canis causes stress by creating wounds on the surface of the hosts' skin. The host also experiences hair loss as a result of increased host grooming in response to the itching feelings of the lice feeding. These problems may be magnified by colder environments. T. canis is also a known intermediate host for Dipylidium caninum, or canine tapeworm. Dipylidium caninum is spread by the consumption of T. canis. Should a human accidentally consume the louse, they may contract the tapeworm as well, although most cases are asymptomatic.

== Treatment of Trichodectes canis infections ==
Infestations of Trichodectes canis are treated according to typical lice infestations in dogs. Imidacloprid and selamectin administered is effective, as well as topical permethrin. Treatment of domesticated dogs is usually very successful, as T. canis has no environmental involvement.

== Notes ==
- Murthy, Rachana. "Trichodectes Canis". University of Michigan Animal Diversity Web.
- "Lice". CAPC Vet. June 2011.
- Bádr, Vladimír; Štefan, Petr; Preisler, Jiří (2005-05-10). "Trichodectes canis (De Geer, 1778) (Phthiraptera, Ischnocera), a new ectoparasite of the raccoon dog (Nyctereutes procyonoides) in the Czech Republic" (PDF). European Journal of Wildlife Research. 51 (2): 133–135. Bibcode:2005EJWR...51..133B. doi:10.1007/s10344-005-0084-1. ISSN 1612-4642. S2CID 44626239. Archived from the original on 2018-04-17.
