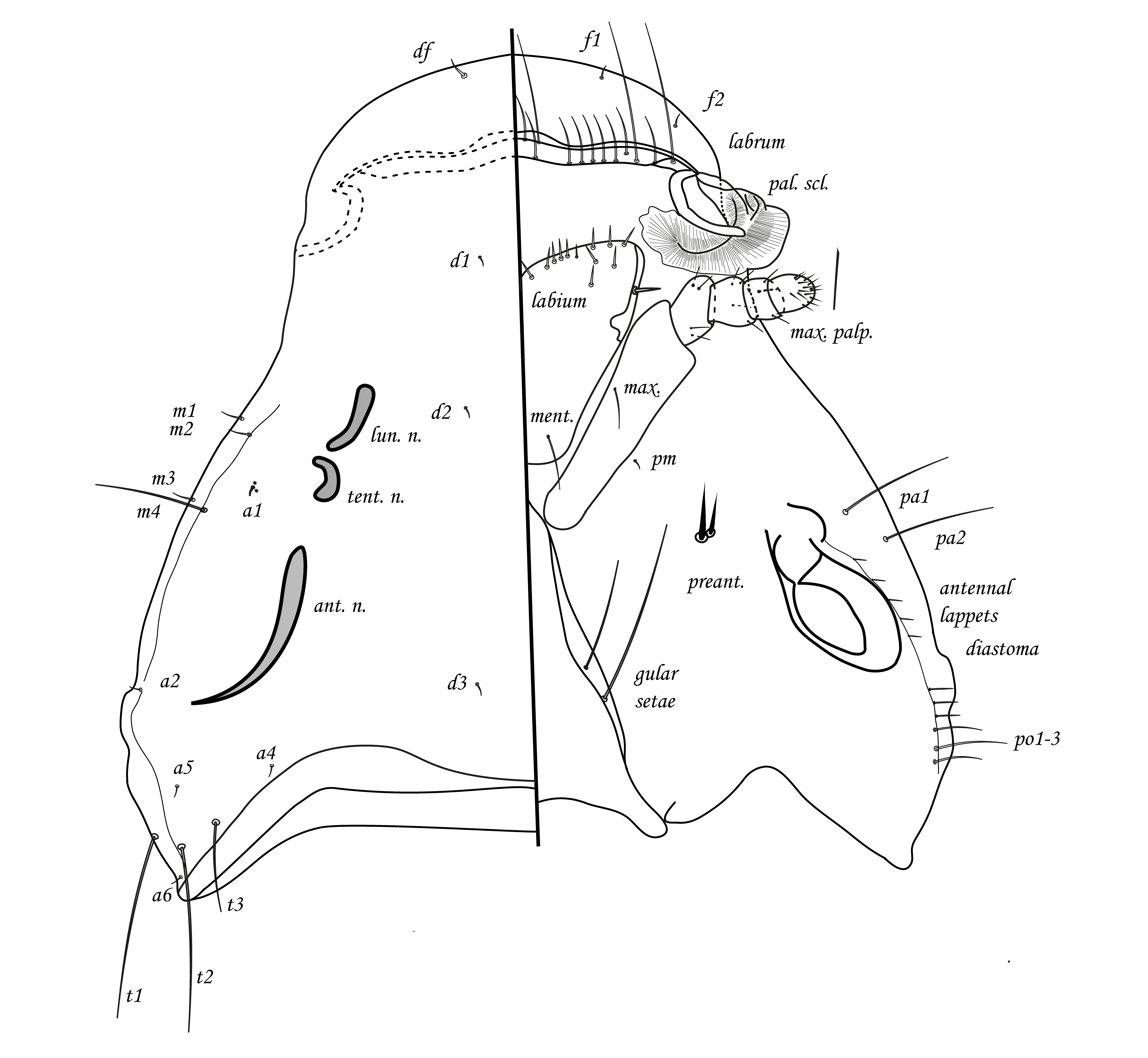
- Head of Ricinus vaderi

Scientific classification
- Kingdom: Animalia
- Phylum: Arthropoda
- Clade: Pancrustacea
- Class: Insecta
- Order: Psocodea
- Infraorder: Phthiraptera
- Family: Ricinidae
- Genus: Ricinus
- Species: R. vaderi

Binomial name
- Ricinus vaderi Valan, 2016

= Ricinus vaderi =

Ricinus

Species of louse

Ricinus vaderi is a species of chewing lice which parasitises the calandra lark (Melanocorypha calandra) in Azerbaijan. It is a member of Ricinus, the largest genus of chewing lice found parasitizing Passeriformes.

The species name is derived from Darth Vader, a fictional character in the Star Wars series. According to Miroslav Valan, Oldrich Sychra and Ivan Literak, the first author's fiancée noticed a similarity between the head of the R. vaderi and Darth Vader's helmet.

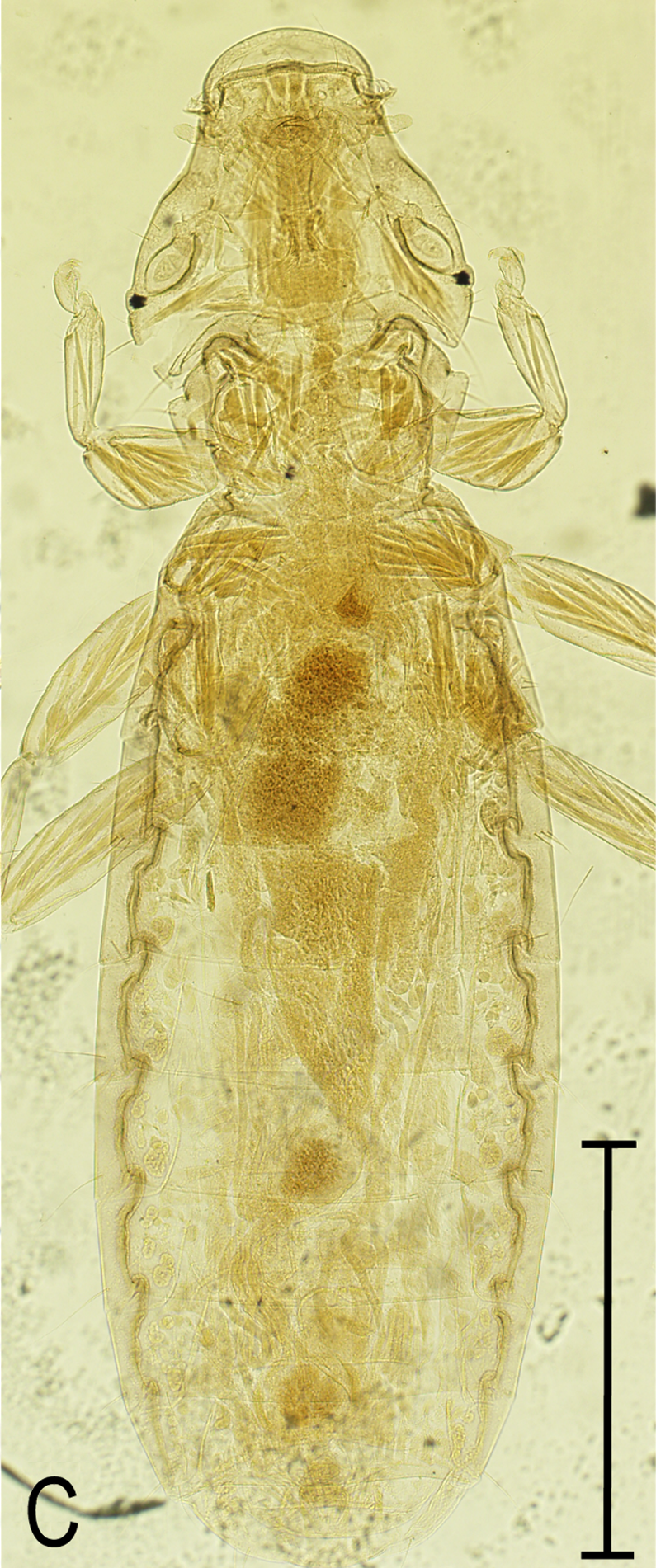
Ricinus vaderi
