= Bird louse =

Common name for several species of louse

A bird louse is any chewing louse (small, biting insects) of order Phthiraptera which parasitizes warm-blooded animals, especially birds. Bird lice may feed on feathers, skin, or blood. They have no wings, and their biting mouth parts distinguish them from true lice, which suck blood.

Almost all domestic birds are hosts for at least one species of bird louse. Chickens and other poultry are attacked by many kinds of bird lice. Bird lice usually do not cause much harm to a bird unless it is unusually infested as in the case of birds with damaged bills which cannot preen themselves properly. A blood-consuming louse that infests Galápagos Hawks is more numerous on hawks without territories, possibly because those individuals spend more time looking for food and less time preening than hawks with territories.

In such cases, their irritation may cause the bird to damage itself by scratching. In extreme cases, the infestation may even interfere with egg production and the fattening of poultry. Unlike true lice, bird lice do not carry infectious diseases. Having coevolved with their specific host(s), phylogenetic relationships among bird lice are sometimes of use when trying to determine phylogenetic relationships among birds.

Earlier all chewing lice were considered to form the paraphyletic order Mallophaga while the sucking lice were thought to form the order Anoplura. However, reclassification (Clay, 1970) has combined these orders into the order Phthiraptera. The bird lice belong to two suborders, Amblycera and Ischnocera, although some members of these suborders do not parasitize birds and are therefore not bird lice.

The families which parasitize birds are:

- Suborder Amblycera
  - Family Menoponidae – birds, including poultry.
  - Family Laemobothriidae – water birds and hawks.
  - Family Ricinidae – hummingbirds and passerines.
- Suborder Ischnocera
  - Family Philopteridae – birds, including poultry.
