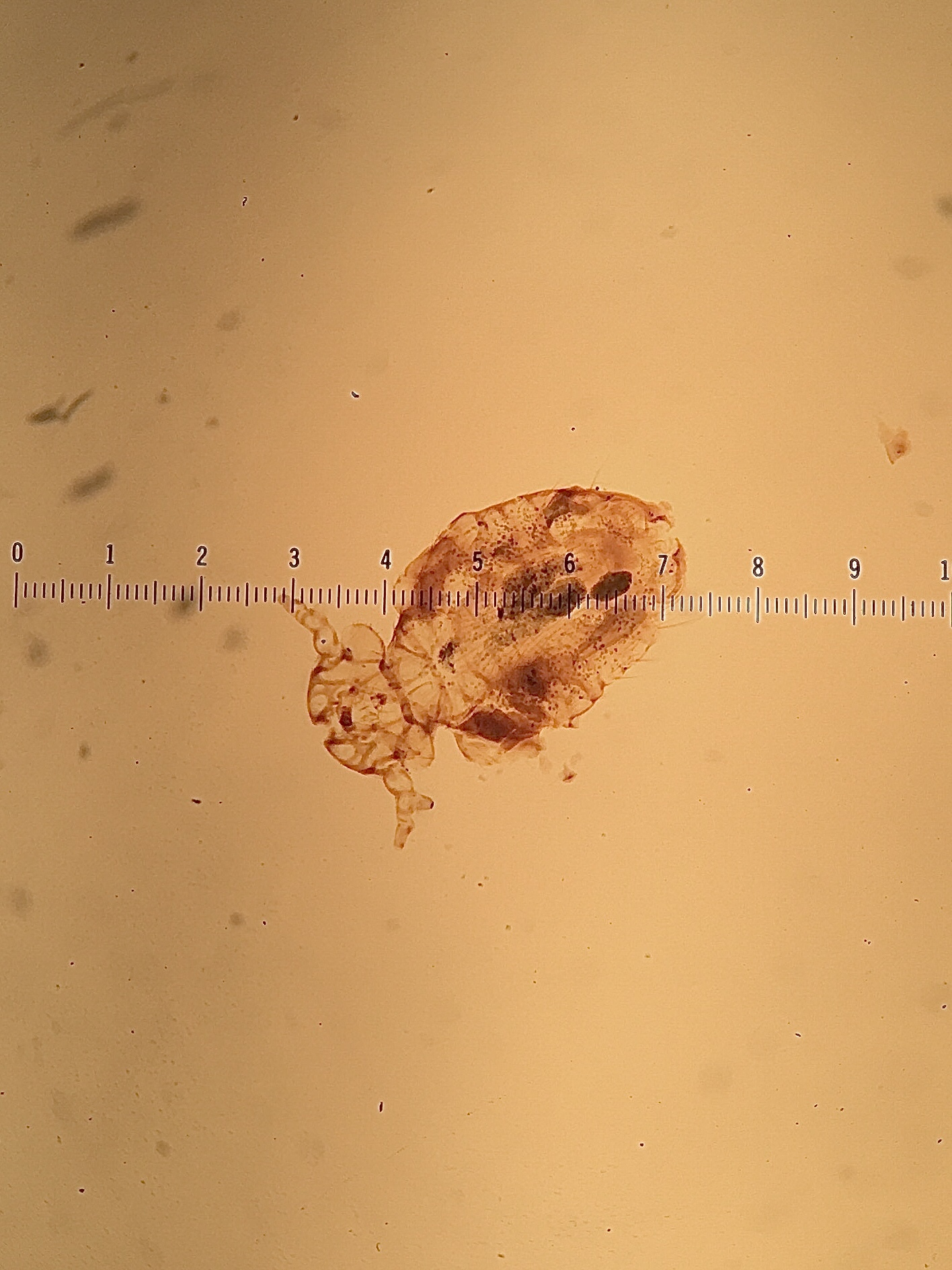

Scientific classification
- Kingdom: Animalia
- Phylum: Arthropoda
- Clade: Pancrustacea
- Class: Insecta
- Order: Psocodea
- Infraorder: Phthiraptera
- Family: Trichodectidae
- Genus: Geomydoecus; Ewing, 1929

Type species
- Trichodectes geomydis Osborn, 1891

Synonyms
- Thaelerius Hellenthal & Price, 1994; Jamespattonius Hellenthal & Price, 1994

= Geomydoecus =

Genus of lice

Geomydoecus is a genus of lice in the suborder Ischnocera. They are parasites of gophers (Geomyidae). Species include:

- Subgenus Geomydoecus Ewing, 1929
  - G. fulvescens Price & Emerson, 1971
  - G. heaneyi Timm & Price, 1980
  - G. geomydis (Osborn, 1891)
  - G. idahoensis Price & Emerson, 1971
  - G. oregonus Price & Emerson, 1971
  - G. pattoni Price & Hellenthal, 1979
  - G. veracruzensis Price & Emerson, 1971
- Subgenus Thaelerius Price & Emerson, 1972
  - G. jamesbeeri Price & Emerson, 1972
