= Geomydoecus oregonus =

Scientific classification
- Kingdom: Animalia
- Phylum: Arthropoda
- Class: Insecta
- Order: Psocodea
- Infraorder: Phthiraptera
- Family: Trichodectidae
- Genus: Geomydoecus
- Subgenus: Geomydoecus
- Species: G. oregonus

Binomial name
- Geomydoecus oregonus Price & Emerson, 1971

Species of louse

Geomydoecus oregonus is a species of louse in the family Trichodectidae. It is known to affect the Camas pocket gopher (Thomomys bulbivorus). This species is only known to inhabit Oregon, the same area as its host species.
