= Bovicola bovis =

Scientific classification
- Kingdom: Animalia
- Phylum: Arthropoda
- Clade: Pancrustacea
- Class: Insecta
- Order: Psocodea
- Infraorder: Phthiraptera
- Family: Trichodectidae
- Genus: Bovicola
- Species: B. bovis

Binomial name
- Bovicola bovis (Linnaeus, 1758)

Species of louse

Bovicola bovis (also called Damalinia bovis and the red louse) is a cattle-biting louse found all over the world. It is a common pest of cattle of all types and sizes. They are one of many lice in the order Phthiraptera, but are divided from their blood sucking cousins in the sub-order Anoplura by the fact that they feed only by chewing. This makes B. bovis a member of the sub-order Mallophaga.

== Biology ==
These lice are composed of three major body regions: the head, thorax, and abdomen. The head of these lice is a dark red color while the rest of the body is yellowish-white. The abdomen has dark transverse bands that run horizontally across each segment along with sparse amounts of setae (hair-like structures). On average, these lice can span from 1-2mm in length as adults. They are dorso-ventrally flattened for ease of travel through the hairs of the host. B. bovis have one tarsal claw at the ends of their legs. They also have clubbed, filiform antennae that extend out the sides of their heads. These antennae commonly have three segments. These lice chew on their hosts, which means that they have mandibles for feeding. They do, however, lack the maxillae that are common to most insects that chew their food. These lice have spiracles located on the edges of each segment of the abdomen to allow the lice to breathe.

== Habitat and diet ==
Bovicola bovis parasitize cattle of any age and size and have not been documented on alternative vertebrates. The common places on the cattle that the louse can be found are the head, neck, back, and the rear end. These lice are obligate parasites, meaning they require the host to survive. Without the host providing both food and shelter, the louse would die.

Bovicola bovis is found in temperate climates worldwide. It is most abundant in North America because of the amounts of cattle present. The louse is also mostly found in the winter and early spring because that is when the hair of the host is longest and the cattle have not started shedding yet.

Whilst on the host, the louse feeds upon the hair, skin, and secretions that are present. B. bovis does not feed on blood. This is part of the reason that these lice are able to survive and thrive off of the cattle. This form of parasitism is minimally invasive and ensures the host and its parasite can co-exist.

== Growth, development and reproduction ==
The average lifespan of B. bovis is about forty-two days. The life of the louse is hemimetabolous, meaning the young of the louse resemble the adult and have the same habitat, behavior, and diet. The louse spends eight days in its egg, or nit, that had been laid on the host. Upon hatching, the louse begins to develop and feed upon the host. The louse goes through three nymph instars before becoming fully mature. Maturation from hatching to adulthood takes about two to three weeks. Once the louse is mature, it begins to look for a mate. Upon mating, the louse becomes fertilized and can lay eggs. B. bovis will lay one egg every two days. This can happen for about two weeks until the louse becomes too old and soon after it loses fertility and the ability to lay eggs, it dies. The eggs hatch and the cycle repeats.

== Effect ==
The effects of B. bovis on its host are negative, but do not usually result in major consequences. Only a few rare cases have resulting in significant health effects to the cattle. There are no known cases of the louse transmitting any kind of disease causing agent.

=== Host health ===
The presence of the louse causes the host to lick itself excessively thus causing abrasions and hair loss. The licking from the cattle and the presence of the louse both cause these health problems to occur. In more extreme cases, anemia can result from the presence of the louse. The presence of the louse can also result in reduced milk production and poor weight gain.

=== Economic effect ===
The two major industries that B. bovis affects are the beef industry and the dairy industry. The main reason that these two industries are the ones affected is that the louse causes reduction in weight gain and milk production. The products of the cattle are also of lower quality than they would be without presence of the louse. Because the louse is so prominent in North America, very much of the cattle are affected and must be carefully treated and looked after.

== Control ==
There is no current means of long term control for the B. bovis louse. One method of control attempted is through the use of the fungus Metarhizium anisopliae. This fungus is used to prevent the louse from multiplying to levels that cause major health problems.
