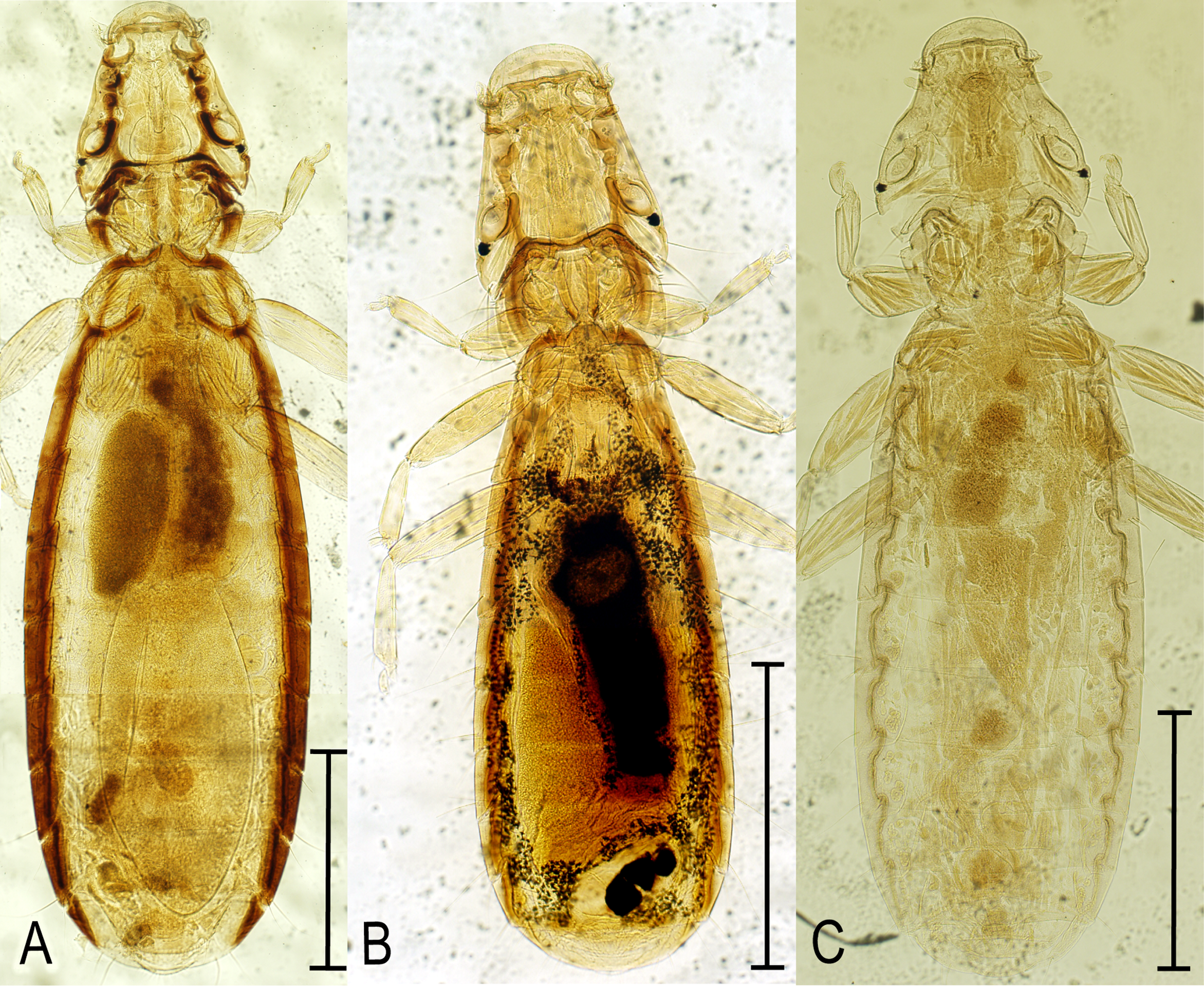
- Ricinus ivanovi, Ricinus tugarinovi and Ricinus vaderi

Scientific classification
- Kingdom: Animalia
- Phylum: Arthropoda
- Clade: Pancrustacea
- Class: Insecta
- Order: Psocodea
- Infraorder: Phthiraptera
- Family: Ricinidae
- Genus: Ricinus; De Geer, 1778

= Ricinus (insect) =

Genus of lice

Ricinus is a genus of chewing lice which parasitise birds. It is the largest-bodied genus of chewing lice found parasitizing Passeriformes.
