= Felicola isidoroi =

Iberian lynx louse

Scientific classification
- Kingdom: Animalia
- Phylum: Arthropoda
- Class: Insecta
- Order: Psocodea
- Infraorder: Phthiraptera
- Family: Trichodectidae
- Genus: Felicola
- Species: †F. isidoroi

Binomial name
- †Felicola isidoroi Perez & Palma, 2001

Species of louse

Felicola isidoroi, the Iberian lynx louse, is an extinct species of trichodectid chewing louse.

== Extinction ==
It is known only from a single specimen, a male. In an example of conservation-induced extinction, it likely died out when the last survivors of its host species, the Iberian lynx, were taken into captivity and de-loused. The specimen is slightly larger than males of most of the remaining species within the subgenus Lorisicola. The female has never been seen. The type specimen is in the collection of the Museo Nacional de Ciencias Naturales in Madrid.

== See also ==
- Colpocephalum californici
- Conservation biology of parasites
- Conservation-induced extinction
