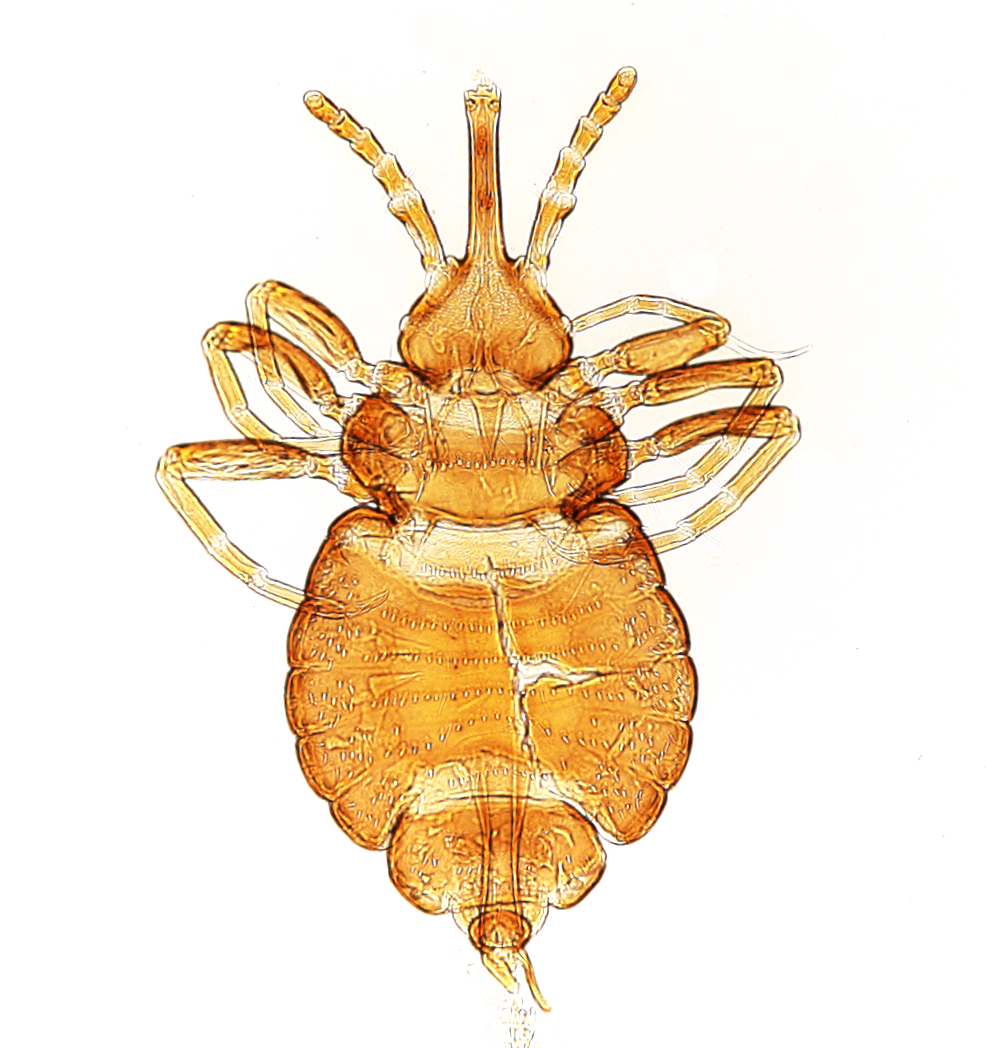

Scientific classification
- Kingdom: Animalia
- Phylum: Arthropoda
- Class: Insecta
- Order: Psocodea
- Infraorder: Phthiraptera
- Family: Haematomyzidae
- Genus: Haematomyzus
- Species: H. elephantis

Binomial name
- Haematomyzus elephantis Piaget, 1896

= Haematomyzus elephantis =

Species of louse

Haematomyzus elephantis is a species of louse that is an ectoparasite of elephants. The species was first described from a specimen obtained from a captive African elephant at Rotterdam Zoo by Édouard Piaget in 1896. Specimens identified under the same name were subsequently recorded from Asian elephants, African elephants and warthogs in the wild.

Early descriptions of the louse noted that they were remarkably similar to the bird lice in spite of differences in the length of the snout, an adaptation for dealing with the thick skin of their hosts, but they were subsequently separated into a different group, the Rhynchophthirina.

The species was first described from an African elephant in captivity. It was subsequently recorded from captive Sri Lankan elephants and a Sumatran elephant. Many of the early descriptions are based on captive hosts and it is unclear whether the parasites came from the wild or if they jumped host from other animals in the zoo. A related species obtained from warthogs in Kenya was described as a new species Haematomyzus hopkinsi by Theresa Clay in 1963. Captive Sri Lankan elephants were examined and found to have high lice prevalence. The African forest elephant has not been examined, but the lice from the African savanna elephant and the Asian elephant are expected to be separate species as the hosts themselves diverged 8.4 million years ago and the lice being wingless are incapable of wide dispersal. Morphologically they appear very similar but molecular phylogenetic studies made in 2023 of specimens from the wild indicate the presence of cryptic species. There are well-marked differences in the mitochondrial DNA sequences between those taken from African savanna and Asian elephants, indicating the need for further study.
