= Conservation-induced extinction =

Termination of a species caused by conservation of a different species

Conservation-induced extinction is where efforts to save endangered species lead to the extinction of other species. This mostly threatens the parasite and pathogen species that are highly host-specific to critically endangered hosts. When the last individuals of a host species are captured for the purpose of captive breeding and reintroduction programs, they typically undergo anti-parasitic treatments to increase survival and reproductive success. This practice may unintentionally result in the extinction of the species antagonistic to the target species, such as certain parasites. It has been proposed that the parasites should be reintroduced to the endangered population. A few cases of conservation-induced extinction have occurred in parasitic lice.

== Examples ==
Extinct species	Host species	Notes
Colpocephalum californici (California condor louse)	California condor	The parasite most probably became extinct when the last individuals of its only host species were captured for a captive-breeding program; all parasites found were deliberately killed in an attempt to assist the host's survival.
Felicola isidoroi (Iberian lynx louse)	Iberian lynx	As with Colpocephalum californici, likely became extinct when the last individuals of its host species were taken into captivity and deloused to assist survival.
Linognathus petasmatus	Scimitar-horned oryx	The host specificity of this parasite is uncertain. Either it was specific to the scimitar-horned oryx and became extinct during captive breeding of the host, or – alternatively – it may be specific to the addax and possibly still surviving in the wild.
Rallicola guami	Guam rail	The only known host species of this parasite exists exclusively in captivity and kept under veterinary control. Little information about the fate of the parasite, likely extinct.
Rallicola pilgrimi	Little spotted kiwi	The parasite most probably became extinct when the last individuals of its only host species were captured and, after routine veterinary antiparasitic treatments, re-introduced into predator-free islands.

== Erroneous example ==
The trichodectid louse of the black-footed ferret has been mentioned in the literature several times as a parasite that became extinct during the captive breeding program of the host. However, this parasite most probably never existed as a separate species from Neotrichodectes minutus.

== Species threatened by conservation-induced extinction ==
Stephanocircus domrowi, the goblin flea, is a critically endangered insect endemic to the Australian state of Victoria. It is host specific, and lives only with the co-endangered Leadbeater's possum. Most conservation efforts of the possum include cleaning its body of parasites to increase chances of survival for the host. Combined with the small size of possum population in the wild, the flea is now a critically endangered species. There has been proposals for its conservation, but none have been carried out.

== See also ==
- Perverse incentive, the general phenomenon of a solution to a problem making the problem worse
- Conservation biology of parasites
