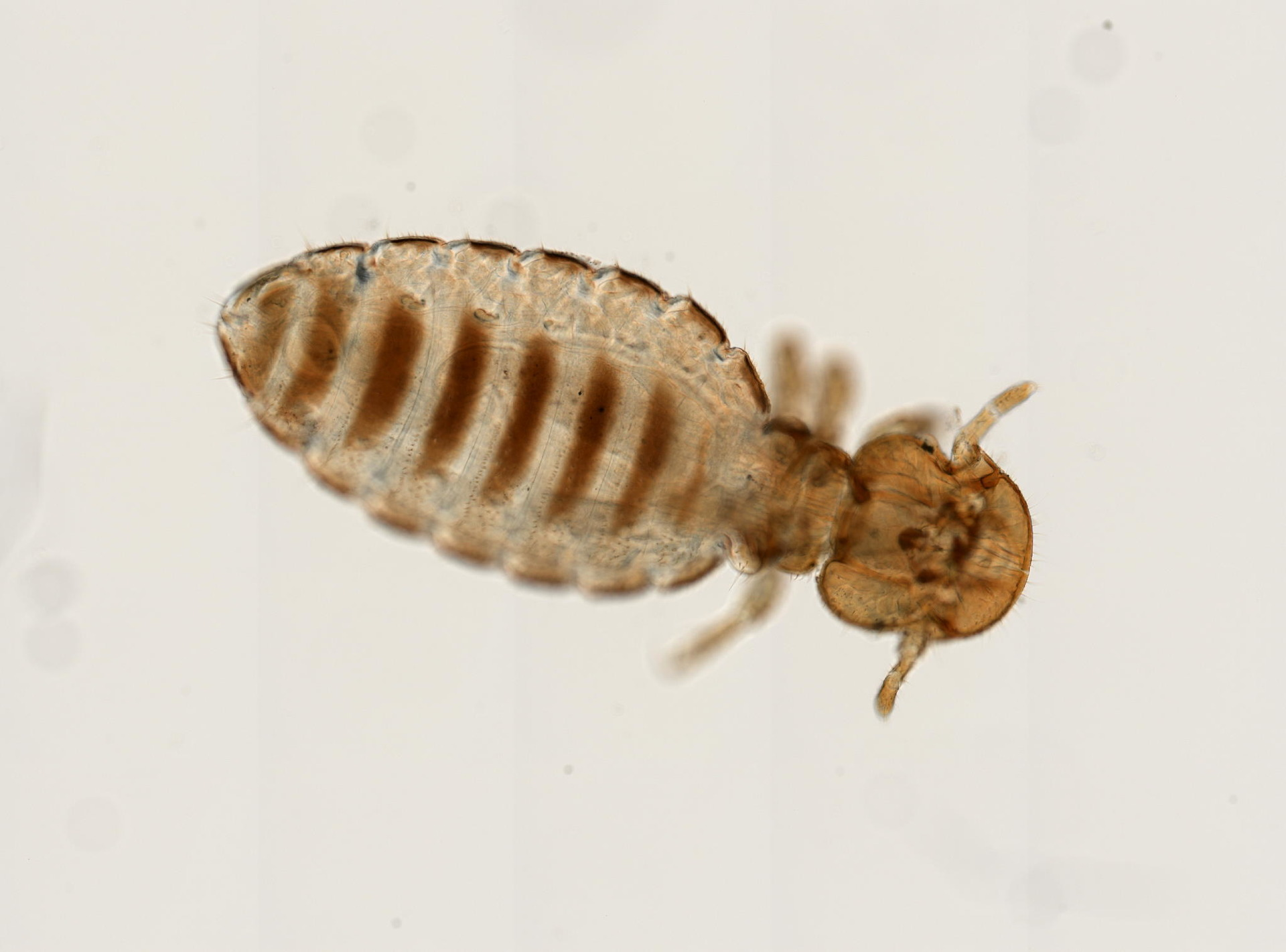
- Trichodectes canis under a microscope

Scientific classification
- Kingdom: Animalia
- Phylum: Arthropoda
- Class: Insecta
- Order: Psocodea
- Infraorder: Phthiraptera
- Family: Trichodectidae
- Genus: Trichodectes; Nitzsch, 1818

= Trichodectes =

Genus of lice

Trichodectes is a genus of louse belonging to the family Trichodectidae. It was described in 1818 by Christian Ludwig Nitzsch, and it has a cosmopolitan distribution. Species are frequently found living on small mammals such as badgers and skunks, and some on domesticated animals like dogs. They range from 1 mm (0.039 in) to 2 mm (0.079 in) and have broad bodies.

== Species ==
This is a list of the currently accepted species in the genus Trichodectes:

- Trichodectes baculus (Schömmer, 1913)
- Trichodectes canis (De Geer, 1778)
- Trichodectes carnivorus (Springholz-Schmidt, 1935)
- Trichodectes emersoni (Hopkins, 1960)
- Trichodectes ermineae (Hopkins, 1941)
- Trichodectes euarctidos (Hopkins, 1954)
- Trichodectes galictidis (Werneck, 1934)
- Trichodectes kuntzi (Emerson, 1964)
- Trichodectes melis (Fabricius, 1805)
- Trichodectes mustelae (Schrank, 1803)
- Trichodectes pinguis (Burmeister, 1838)
- Trichodectes tigris (Ponton, 1870)
- Trichodectes vosseleri (Stobbe, 1913)
