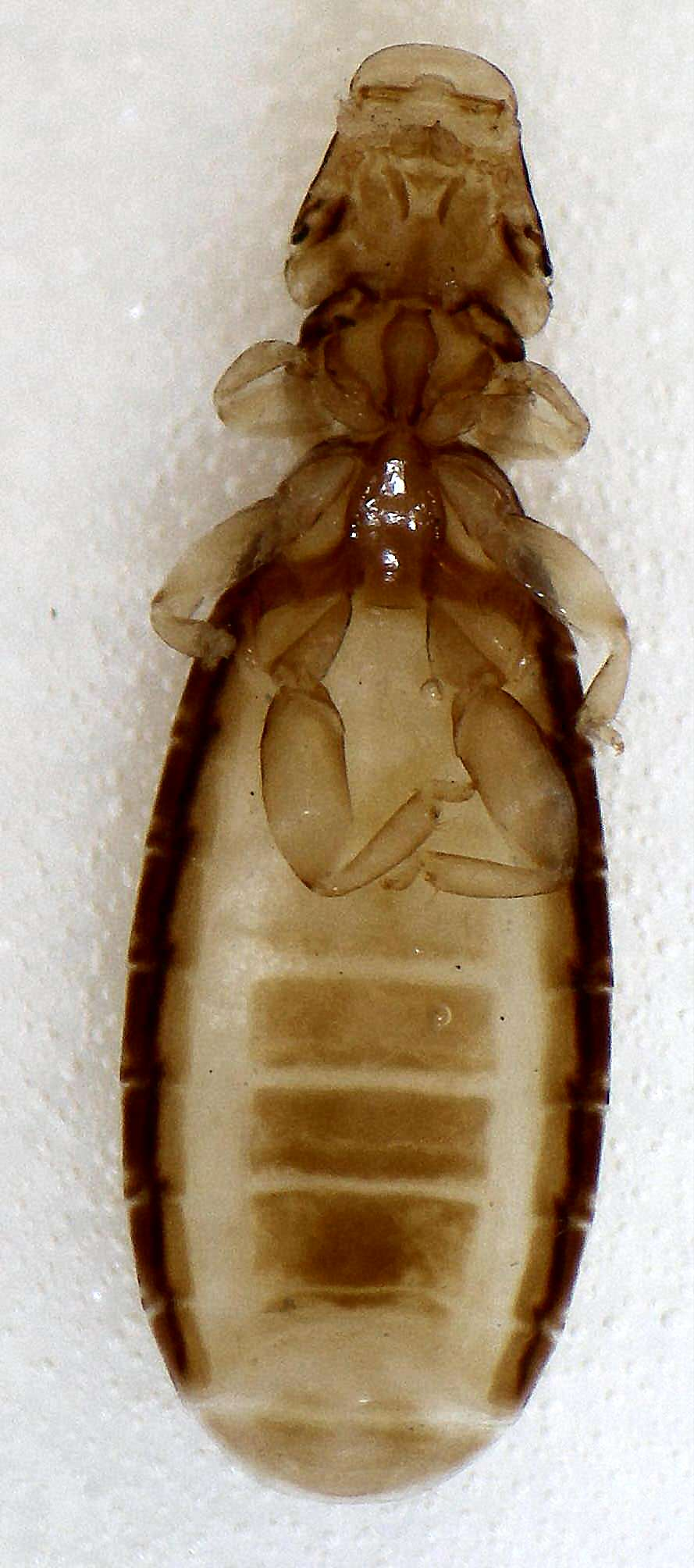
- Ricinus bombycillae

Scientific classification
- Kingdom: Animalia
- Phylum: Arthropoda
- Clade: Pancrustacea
- Class: Insecta
- Order: Psocodea
- Suborder: Troctomorpha
- Infraorder: Phthiraptera
- Parvorder: Amblycera
- Family: Ricinidae

Genera
- Ricinus; Trochiliphagus; Trochiloecetes

= Ricinidae =

Family of lice

The Ricinidae are a family of a larger group Amblycera of the chewing lice. All species are relatively large bodied (relative to host size) avian ectoparasites. They typically exhibit low prevalence (proportion of infested hosts) and low intensity (number of parasites per infested hosts). They feed on host blood which is atypical in chewing lice. Two or three genera are recognized. They exhibit strongly female-biased sex-ratios, especially in low-intensity infestations.

The genus Ricinus (65 species) parasitize small or medium-sized Passeriformes. (Note that Ricinus is also a valid genus name in plant taxonomy.)

The genus Trochiliphagus (13 species) is very similar to the former one, considered to be identical with that by some authors, but infest hummingbirds.

The genus Trochiloecetes (30 species) also parasitize hummingbirds, but – unlike the former genera – their infestations are usually restricted to the head and neck of the host.

The latter two genera constitute the most important members of hummingbirds' parasite fauna, although their ecology is poorly understood.
