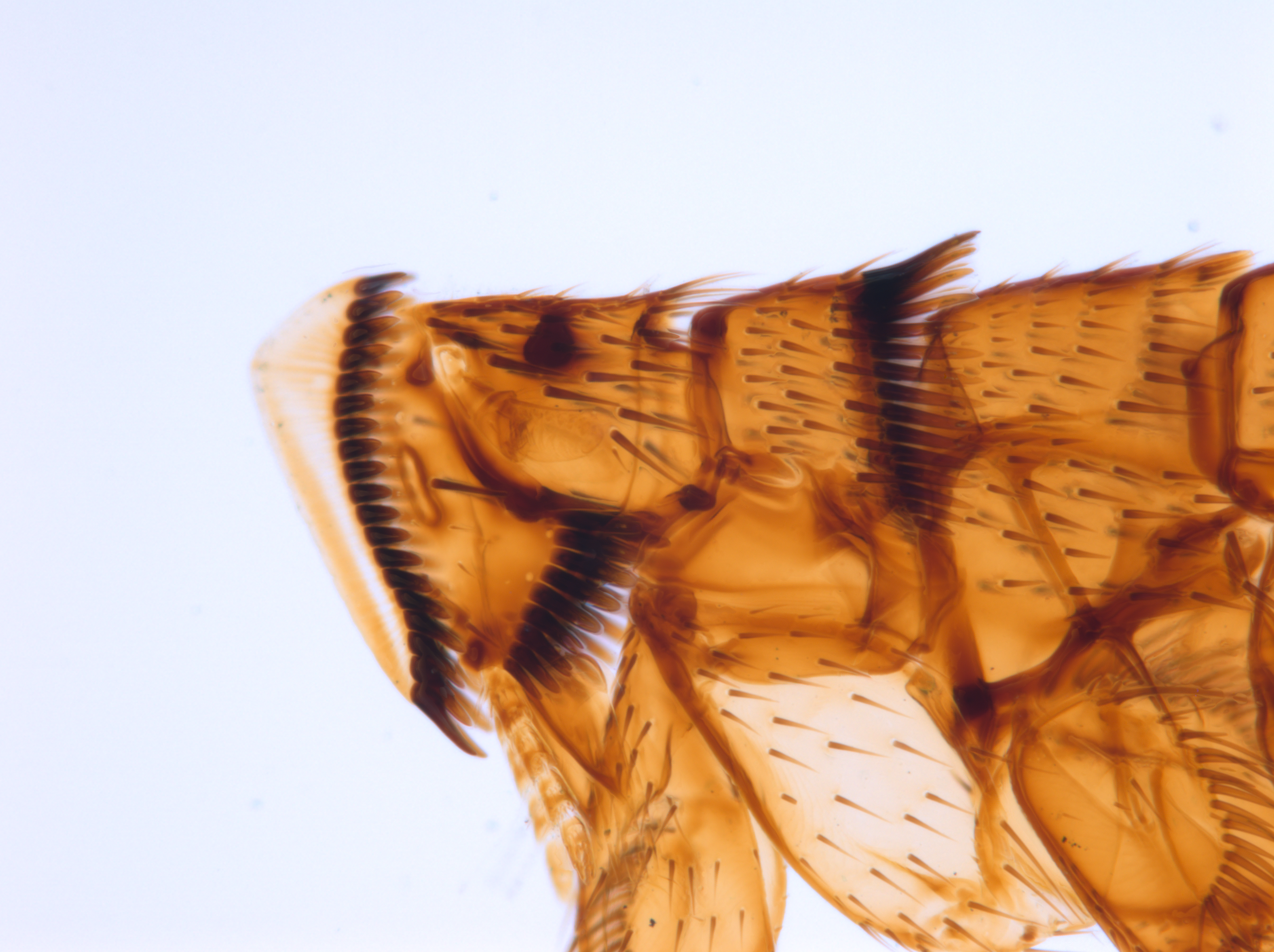
- Anterior section of Stephanocircus domrowi

Scientific classification
- Kingdom: Animalia
- Phylum: Arthropoda
- Clade: Pancrustacea
- Class: Insecta
- Order: Siphonaptera
- Family: Stephanocircidae
- Genus: Stephanocircus
- Species: S. domrowi

Binomial name
- Stephanocircus domrowi Traub & Dunnet, 1973

= Stephanocircus domrowi =

Species of flea

Stephanocircus domrowi, the goblin flea, is a critically endangered insect endemic to the Australian state of Victoria. It is host specific, and lives only with the co-endangered Leadbeater's possum. Although it has been suggested as a good candidate species for conservation, there is presently no work directed towards its conservation. The key threat factor driving the decline of the Leadbeater's possum, and by extension the co-endangered goblin flea, is logging in the mountain ash forests of the Victorian central highlands. To avoid extinction, a number of conservation steps will need to be taken including amalgamating the goblin flea into the captive breeding program for its host at Healesville Sanctuary.

== See also ==
- Conservation-induced extinction
