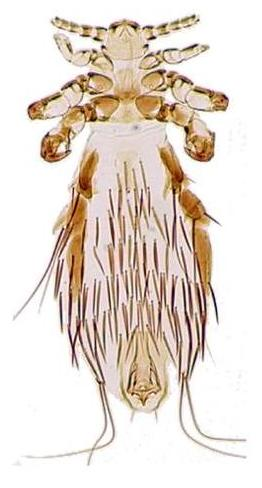

Scientific classification
- Domain: Eukaryota
- Kingdom: Animalia
- Phylum: Arthropoda
- Class: Insecta
- Order: Psocodea
- Family: Polyplacidae
- Genus: Fahrenholzia
- Species: F. pinnata

Binomial name
- Fahrenholzia pinnata Kellogg and Ferris, 1915

= Fahrenholzia pinnata =

Species of louse

Fahrenholzia pinnata is a species of louse. Its typical host is a rodent.
