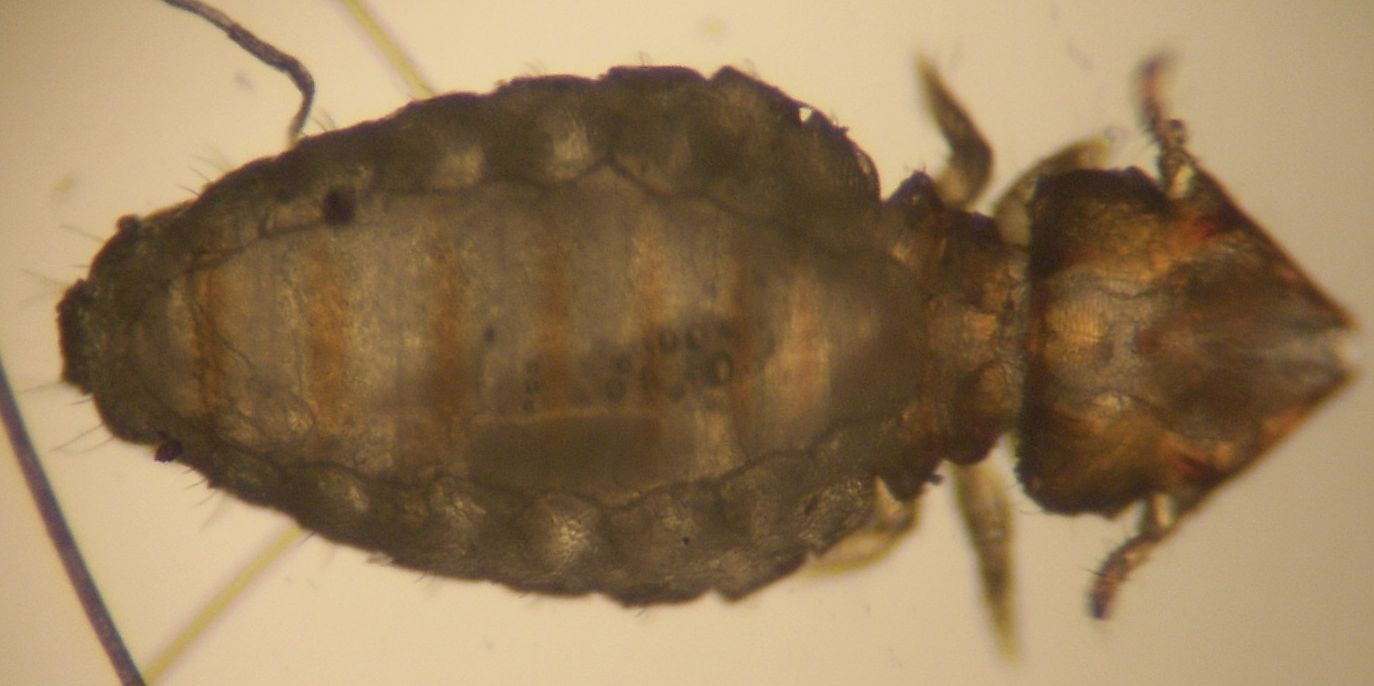
- Felicola subrostris

Scientific classification
- Kingdom: Animalia
- Phylum: Arthropoda
- Class: Insecta
- Order: Psocodea
- Infraorder: Phthiraptera
- Family: Trichodectidae
- Genus: Felicola; Ewing, 1929

Type species
- Trichodectes subrostratus Burmeister, 1838

= Felicola =

Genus of booklice

Felicola is a genus of parasitic lice in the family Trichodectidae. There are at least 50 described species in Felicola.

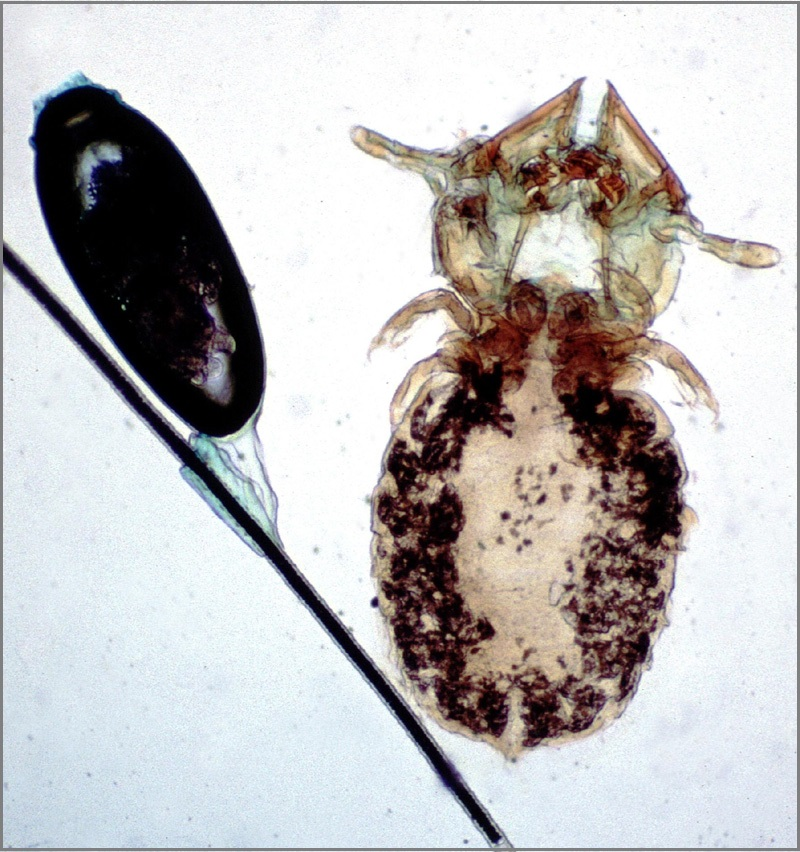
Adult Felicola louse and egg

== Species ==
These 56 species belong to the genus Felicola:

- Felicola acuticeps (Neumann, L. G., 1902)^{c g}
- Felicola acutirostris (Stobbe, 1913)^{c g}
- Felicola africanus (Emerson & R. D. Price, 1966)^{c g}
- Felicola americanus Emerson & R. D. Price, 1983^{c g}
- Felicola aspidorhynchus (Werneck, 1948)^{c g}
- Felicola bedfordi Hopkins, G. H. E., 1942^{c g}
- Felicola bengalensis (Werneck, 1948)^{c g}
- Felicola braziliensis Emerson & R. D. Price, 1983^{c g}
- Felicola caffra (Bedford, G. A. H., 1919)^{c g}
- Felicola calogaleus (Bedford, G. A. H., 1928)^{c g}
- Felicola congoensis (Emerson & R. D. Price, 1967)^{c g}
- Felicola cooleyi (Bedford, G. A. H., 1929)^{c g}
- Felicola cynictis (Bedford, G. A. H., 1928)^{c g}
- Felicola decipiens Hopkins, G. H. E., 1941^{c g}
- Felicola fahrenholzi (Werneck, 1948)^{c g}
- Felicola felis (Werneck, 1934)^{c g}
- Felicola fennecus (Emerson & R. D. Price, 1981)^{c g}
- Felicola genettae (Fresca, 1924)^{c g}
- Felicola guinlei (Werneck, 1948)^{c g}
- Felicola helogale Bedford, G. A. H., 1932^{c g}
- Felicola helogaloidis (Werneck, 1948)^{c g}
- Felicola hercynianus Kéler, 1957^{c g}
- Felicola hopkinsi Bedford, G. A. H., 1936^{c g}
- Felicola inaequalis (Piaget, 1880)^{c g}
- Felicola juccii (Conci, 1942)^{c g}
- Felicola laticeps (Werneck, 1942)^{c g}
- Felicola lenicornis (Werneck, 1948)^{c g}
- Felicola liberiae Emerson & R. D. Price, 1972^{c g}
- Felicola macrurus Werneck, 1948^{c g}
- Felicola malaysianus (Werneck, 1948)^{c g}
- Felicola minimus Werneck, 1948^{c g}
- Felicola mjoebergi (Stobbe, 1913)^{c g}
- Felicola mungos (Stobbe, 1913)^{c g}
- Felicola neoafricanus (Emerson & R. D. Price, 1968)^{c g}
- Felicola neofelis Emerson & R. D. Price, 1983^{c g}
- Felicola occidentalis (Emerson, 1980)^{c g}
- Felicola oncae Timm & R. D. Price, 1994^{c g}
- Felicola paralaticeps (Werneck, 1948)^{c g}
- Felicola philippinensis (Emerson, 1965)^{c g}
- Felicola pygidialis Werneck, 1948^{c g}
- Felicola quadraticeps (Chapman, B. L., 1897)^{c g}
- Felicola rahmi Emerson & Stojanovich, 1966^{c g}
- Felicola robertsi Hopkins, G. H. E., 1944^{c g}
- Felicola rohani Werneck, 1956^{c g}
- Felicola setosus Bedford, G. A. H., 1932^{c g}
- Felicola siamensis Emerson, 1964^{c g}
- Felicola similis Emerson & R. D. Price, 1983^{c g}
- Felicola spenceri Hopkins, G. H. E., 1960^{c g}
- Felicola subrostratus (Burmeister, 1838)^{c g b} (cat biting louse)
- Felicola sudamericanus Emerson & R. D. Price, 1983^{c g}
- Felicola sumatrensis (Werneck, 1948)^{c g}
- Felicola viverriculae (Stobbe, 1913)^{c g}
- Felicola vulpis (Denny, 1842)^{c g}
- Felicola wernecki Hopkins, G. H. E., 1941^{c g}
- Felicola zeylonicus Bedford, G. A. H., 1936^{c g}
- †Felicola isidoroi Perez & Palma, 2001^{c g}

Data sources: i = ITIS, c = Catalogue of Life, g = GBIF, b = Bugguide.net
