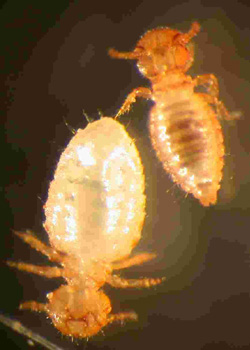
- Damalinia limbata (Sheep Lice)

Scientific classification
- Domain: Eukaryota
- Kingdom: Animalia
- Phylum: Arthropoda
- Class: Insecta
- Order: Psocodea
- Infraorder: Phthiraptera
- Family: Trichodectidae
- Genus: Damalinia; Mjöberg, 1910

Species
- see text

Synonyms
- Cervicola Kéler, 1934; Tragulicola Lyal, 1985

= Damalinia =

Genus of lice

Damalinia is a genus of lice belonging to the family Trichodectidae.

Species:

- Damalinia adenota (Bedford, 1936)
- Damalinia appendiculata (Piaget, 1880)
- Damalinia baxi Hopkins, 1947
- Damalinia chorleyi (Hopkins, 1941)
- Damalinia crenelata Plaget, 1880
- Damalinia dimorpha (Bedford, 1939)
- Damalinia fahrenholzi (Eichler, 1949)
- Damalinia harrisoni (Cummings, 1916)
- Damalinia hilli (Bedford, 1934)
- Damalinia neotheileri Emerson & Price, 1971
- Damalinia orientalis (Emerson & Price, 1982)
- Damalinia ornata Werneck, 1957
- Damalinia pelea (Bedford, 1934)
- Damalinia semitheileri Emerson & Price, 1971
- Damalinia theileri Bedford, 1928
- Damalinia thompsoni (Bedford, 1936)
