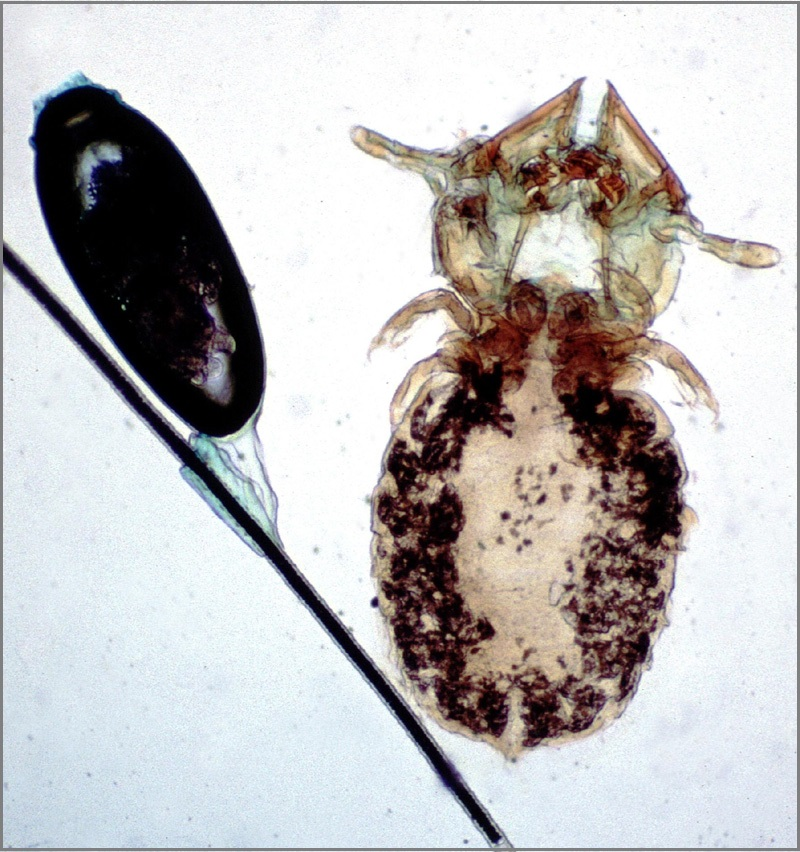
- Felicola sp. with egg

Scientific classification
- Kingdom: Animalia
- Phylum: Arthropoda
- Clade: Pancrustacea
- Class: Insecta
- Order: Psocodea
- Infraorder: Phthiraptera
- Parvorder: Trichodectera

Families
- Trichodectoidea (superfamily); Bovicolidae; Dasyonygidae; Trichodectidae

= Trichodectera =

Parvorder of lice

Trichodectera is a parvorder of lice from the infraorder Phthiraptera that are parasites of mammals. It contains the large family Trichodectidae, plus a few minor families.

Trichodectidae was previously classified as belonging to Ischnocera, but phylogenetic studies had found that group to be paraphyletic. In 2021, de Moya et al. proposed that Trichodectidae be split off from Ischnocera and to be put into a newly created grouping called Trichodectera.

Below is a cladogram showing the position of Trichodectera within Phthiraptera:

- Phthiraptera
  - - Ischnocera
      Philopteridae
    - - - Anoplura
        - Rhynchophthirina
      - Trichodectera
        Trichodectidae
  - Amblycera
