= Bovicola =

Scientific classification
- Domain: Eukaryota
- Kingdom: Animalia
- Phylum: Arthropoda
- Class: Insecta
- Order: Psocodea
- Family: Trichodectidae
- Genus: Bovicola; Ewing, 1929

Genus of lice

Bovicola is a genus of lice belonging to the family Trichodectidae.

The genus has cosmopolitan distribution.

Species:

- Bovicola alpinus Kéler, 1942
- Bovicola bovis (Linnaeus, 1758)
- Bovicola breviceps (Rudow, 1866)
- Bovicola caprae (Gurlt, 1843)
- Bovicola concavifrons (G.H.E.Hopkins, 1960)
- Bovicola crassipes (Rudow, 1866)
- Bovicola hemitragi (Cummings, 1916)
- Bovicola jellisoni Emerson, 1962
- Bovicola limbatus (Gervais, 1844)
- Bovicola longicornis (Nitzsch, 1818)
- Bovicola multispinosus Emerson & R.D.Price, 1979
- Bovicola oreamnidis (G.H.E.Hopkins, 1960)
- Bovicola ovis (Schrank, 1781)
- Bovicola sedecimdecembrii Eichler, 1946
- Bovicola tarandi (Mjoberg, 1910)
- Bovicola tibialis (Piaget, 1880)
