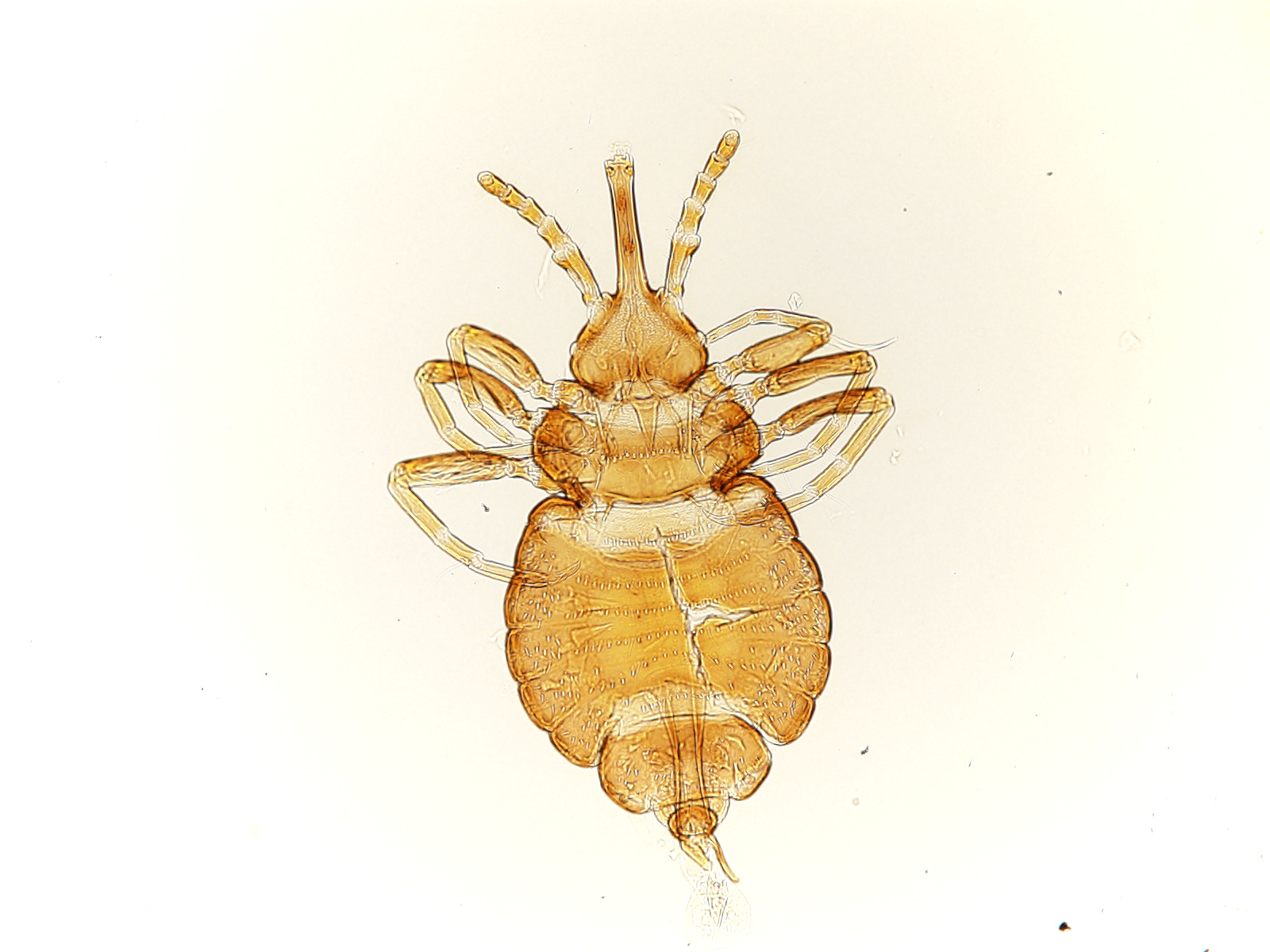
- Haematomyzus elephantis

Scientific classification
- Kingdom: Animalia
- Phylum: Arthropoda
- Clade: Pancrustacea
- Class: Insecta
- Order: Psocodea
- Suborder: Troctomorpha
- Infraorder: Phthiraptera
- Parvorder: Rhynchophthirina; Ferris, 1931
- Family: Haematomyzidae; Enderlein, 1904
- Genus: Haematomyzus; Piaget, 1869

Type species
- Haematomyzus elephantis Piaget, 1869

Species
- H. elephantis Piaget, 1869; H. hopkinsi Clay, 1963; H. porci Emerson & Price, 1988

Synonyms
- Idolocoris Walker, 1872; Phantasmocoris White, 1872

= Haematomyzus =

Genus of lice

Haematomyzus is a monotypic genus of lice with 3 species. The genus is placed in its own family Haematomyzidae, itself monotypic within the parvorder Rhynchophthirina (previously ranked as a superfamily). These unusual lice are ectoparasites of elephants and warthogs. Their mouthparts are elongated to form a drill-like structure that allows them to penetrate the thick skin of their host.

== Taxonomy ==
The three species, Haematomyzus elephantis (elephant louse), Haematomyzus hopkinsi (warthog louse) and Haematomyzus porci (red river hog louse) belong to a single family, the Haematomyzidae, itself the only family within Rhynchophthirina. Rhychophthirina is a parvorder within the infraorder Phthiraptera. A molecular phylogenetic study using subunit rRNA sequences suggests a placement of the Rhychophthirina as a sister group of the Anoplura.

Below is a cladogram showing the position of Rhychophthirina within Phthiraptera:

- Phthiraptera
  - - Ischnocera
      Philopteridae
    - - - Anoplura
        - Rhynchophthirina
      - Trichodectera
        Trichodectidae
  - Amblycera

== Host records ==
H. elephantis is known from both the African and Asian Elephant in captivity but the species found in the wild are thought to have coevolved with their hosts and further study is required.

== Notes ==
The first spelling of "Rhyncophthirina" by Ferris was a lapse, and in subsequent use of the term he spelled it "Rhynchophthirina" adding the second "h". Ordinal names are not covered by the International Code of Nomenclature and thus the name and spelling comes down to a matter of personal preference. The majority of phthirapterists spell the suborder as "Rhynchophthirina" as did Hopkins and Clay, 1952, and Price et al., 2003.
