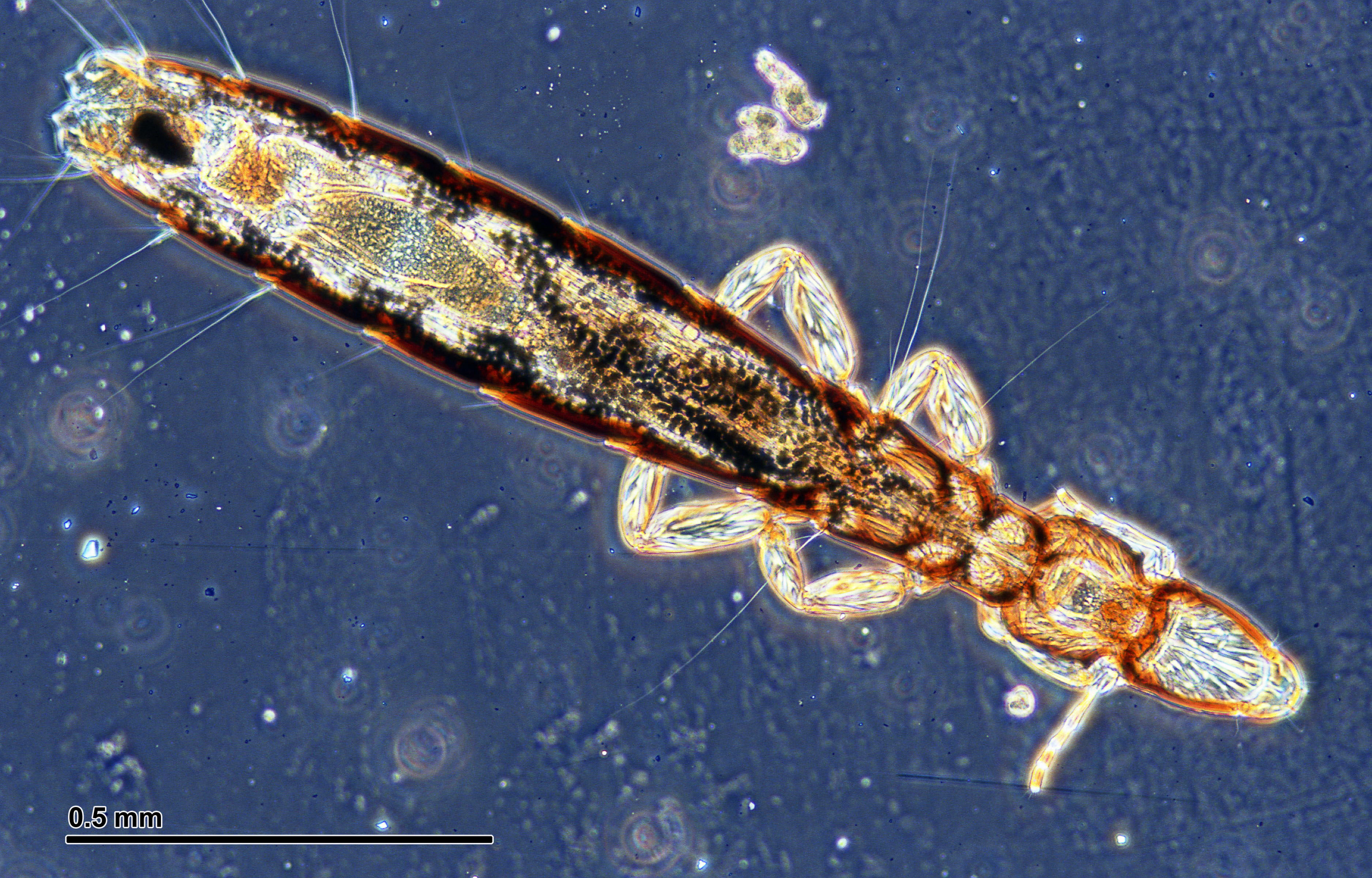
- Columbicola columbae under a microscope

Scientific classification
- Kingdom: Animalia
- Phylum: Arthropoda
- Clade: Pancrustacea
- Class: Insecta
- Order: Psocodea
- Suborder: Troctomorpha
- Infraorder: Phthiraptera
- Parvorder: Ischnocera; Kellogg, 1896

Families
- Philopteroidea (superfamily); Goniodidae; Heptapsogasteridae; Lipeuridae; Philopteridae; Trichophilopteridae

= Ischnocera =

Parvorder of lice

Ischnocera is a large parvorder of lice from the infraorder Phthiraptera. The parvorder consists of chewing lice, which feed on the feathers and skin debris of birds. Many species of Ischnocera have evolved an elongated body shape, which allows them to conceal themselves within plumage to avoid being dislodged during preening or flight. Species in Ischnocera spend their entire lives living on a host and attach themselves to hippoboscid flies to help move across individual birds. Ischnocera contain the large family Philopteridae, along with a few other minor families. Ischnocera are distributed globally, with around 3,800 species identified. These lice are very host-specific, and each species rarely parasitizes outside of its preferred bird species. Birds infested by ischnoceran species can experience discomfort and damage to reproductive systems.

== Classification ==
Ischnocera previously included the mammalian parasitic lice Trichodectera, but phylogenetic studies had found the grouping to be paraphyletic, specifically in regard to the two major families Philopteridae and Trichodectidae. To resolve this, de Moya et al. proposed retaining the majority of the species (including Philopteridae) within Ischnocera, and then moving Trichodectidae to their own grouping called Trichodectera.

Below is a cladogram showing the position of Ischnocera within Phthiraptera:

- Phthiraptera
  - - Ischnocera (chewing lice of birds)
      Philopteridae
    - (lice of mammals)
      - - Anoplura (sucking lice of mammals)
        - Rhynchophthirina (drilling lice of elephants and warthogs)
      - Trichodectera
        Trichodectidae (chewing lice of mammals)
  - Amblycera (chewing lice of birds)

== Characteristics ==
Ischnoceran lice are characterized by pulvinus-like mandibles thickened at the base, and two tarsal claws on each of their legs. Like all chewing lice, they are wingless with dorsoventrally flattened bodies. They are permanent ectoparasites that live all of their lives on a host bird. They do not have ocelli, and their antennae are broken into three to five segments. The length of adults ranges from 0.3 to 12 mm depending on the species. Their heads are typically broad and triangular-shaped, with hook-like structures on the surface. The postclypeus region is broad, with vertical stripes of thin cuticles. The head also contains repeating ridges, which is used to help strengthen the exoskeleton. Unlike their close taxonomic relative Amblycera, Ischnocera lack maxillary palps used to manipulate food. Their color is typically brown, but some species can be black or white, and their rostra are elongated significantly. Their abdomens are usually divided into eight segments, with the males characterized by having a large anterior plate, and the females having a continuous plate across their backs. Younger members of the Ischnocera's evolutionary lineage have paired structures called mycetomes. Species of Ischnocera are very host-specific, with some birds receiving their classification based on the individual species of lice they are hosting.

=== Lifecycle ===
Ischnoceran lice can survive several weeks living off of their hosts. Their lifecycle consists of a simple metamorphosis, with three separate stages. Adult female lice lay eggs (also referred to as "nits") on the bodies of their host, where they develop and hatch within 4-15 days. This is followed by the nymph stage for around 3-8 days, before finishing development in adults. After the lice are sufficiently fed, the males use their antennae to touch the heads of females to signal they are ready to mate. When the adult females lay eggs, they typically do so in batches of 200 to 300 that are glued onto the feathers of their hosts to repeat the cycle. The glue is a cement-like material that is excreted from the louse's oviducts. Ischnocera are unable to move from the feathers to the skin of their hosts due to their specialized anatomy. To move across individual birds, ischnocerans "hitchhike" on hippoboscid flies that land on the current host. This is done to avoid competition from other lice by finding a new host on which to feed.

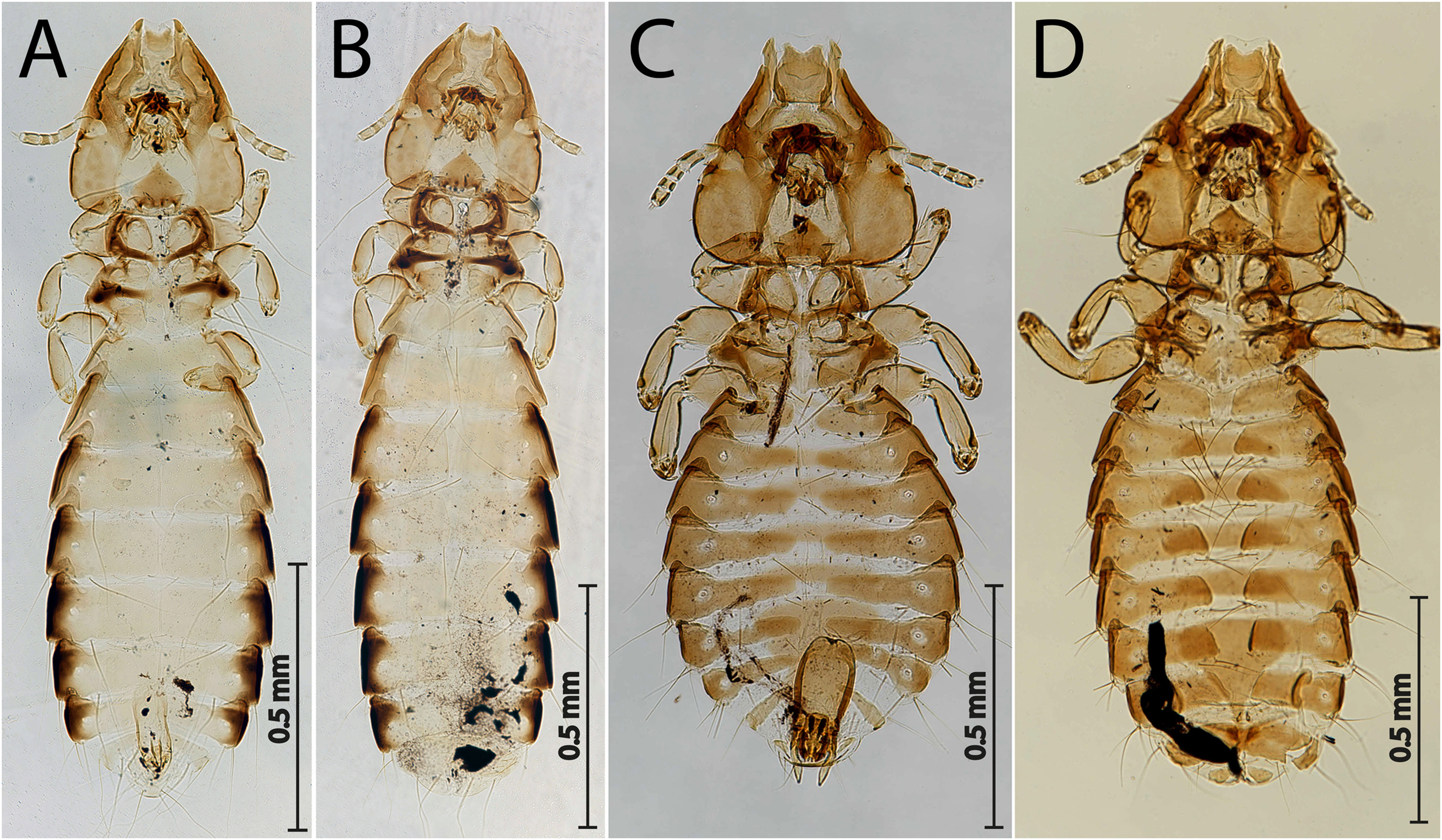
Guimaraesiella tovornikae (A - male, B - female) on the Eurasian blackcap, and Sturnidoecus (C - male, D - female) on the common blackbird

=== Distribution ===
Ischnocera are distributed globally, with 3,800 different species across all the continents except Antarctica. The majority of species identified reside in Europe, North America, and the Neotropical realm. They are found in areas where birds suffer from malnutrition and overcrowding, as well, due to the ease of moving across individuals.

== Feeding ==
Ischnocerans primarily feed on the feathers and skin debris of different species of birds. They are highly host specific, and usually do not deviate from their chosen species. They do not consume the blood of their hosts, and are found within the feathers to avoid being dislodged. The lice have specific areas of the bird on which they prefer to feed and typically do not move away from that area. Preferred areas of the birds are the head, neck, and the croup. Birds in humid regions are more prone to being infested by Ischnocera, with the trend continuing regardless of the species. Species such as the Columbicola columbae feed mostly on the feather's barbules, as well as keratin-rich skin near the wing and tail feathers. The lice also tend to feed on oils secreted by the bird. Members of the Ischnocera contain endosymbiotic bacteria that aid in the digestion of the debris and feathers of their hosts.

== Effects ==
Ischnocera can cause significant irritation and damage to the feathers of their hosts. Infestations can cause damage to egg production and growth in poultry. The lice can cause preening and scratching in hosts, along with the loss of feathers, potentially resulting in bald spots. Birds with poor hygiene and weak immune systems are vulnerable to infestations due to a reduced ability to fight them. Bald patches in birds can result in decreased insulation and disease susceptibility. Self-grooming by the bird can help dislodge some of the infestation, although it is usually not enough to remove them entirely. The ability to remove the lice largely depends on the size of the bird's beak. If a bird has a damaged beak, it can become significantly more susceptible to infestations. Some birds use an oil they secrete from their uropygial gland and spread it across their bodies to make the lice's ability to attach themselves more difficult. Flight performance, lifespan, and sexual selection are negatively affected in infested birds. The host's metabolic rate and overall body mass are lowered during an infestation. The lice can serve as vectors carrying bacterial diseases to the birds. Infested birds show nervousness and discomfort, especially while they are nesting. Spraying the infested bird with pesticides can help kill the lice.

== Families ==
Ischnocera comprises these families:

- Philopteroidea Nitzsch, 1938 (superfamily)
  - Goniodidae Mjoberg, 1910
  - Heptapsogasteridae Carriker, 1936
  - Lipeuridae Mjoberg, 1910
  - Philopteridae Nitzsch, 1818
  - Trichophilopteridae Mjoberg, 1919

== Sources ==
- Allaby, Michael (2020), A Dictionary of Zoology (5th ed.), Oxford: Oxford University Press, ISBN 9780198845089, OCLC 1159542028
- Resh, Vincent (2009), T. Cardé, Ring (ed.), Encyclopedia of Insects (2nd ed.), Amsterdam: Elsevier/Academic Press, ISBN 9780080920900, OCLC 500570904
- Taylor, M. A.; Coop, R. L.; Wall, R.L. (2013), Veterinary Parasitology (3rd ed.), John Wiley & Sons, ISBN 9781118687116, OCLC 833764955
- Kumar, Prabhat; Tandan, Bhup (1971), The species of Ardeicola (Phthiraptera: Ischnocera) parasitic on the Ciconiidae, vol. 26, London: British Museum, ISBN 9780119813388, OCLC 532718
- Lucius, Richard (January 4, 2017), The Biology of Parasites, Wiley, ISBN 9783527698561, OCLC 975277640
- Carro, Maria; Andrés, Maria Jesús (2015), Manual de entomología aplicada [Manual of Applied Entomology] (in Spanish), EDITORIAL SANZ Y TORRES S.L., ISBN 9788415550556, OCLC 935722253
- Samour, Jaime (2016), Avian medicine (3rd ed.), St. Louis: Elsevier, ISBN 9780723438328, OCLC 945101563
