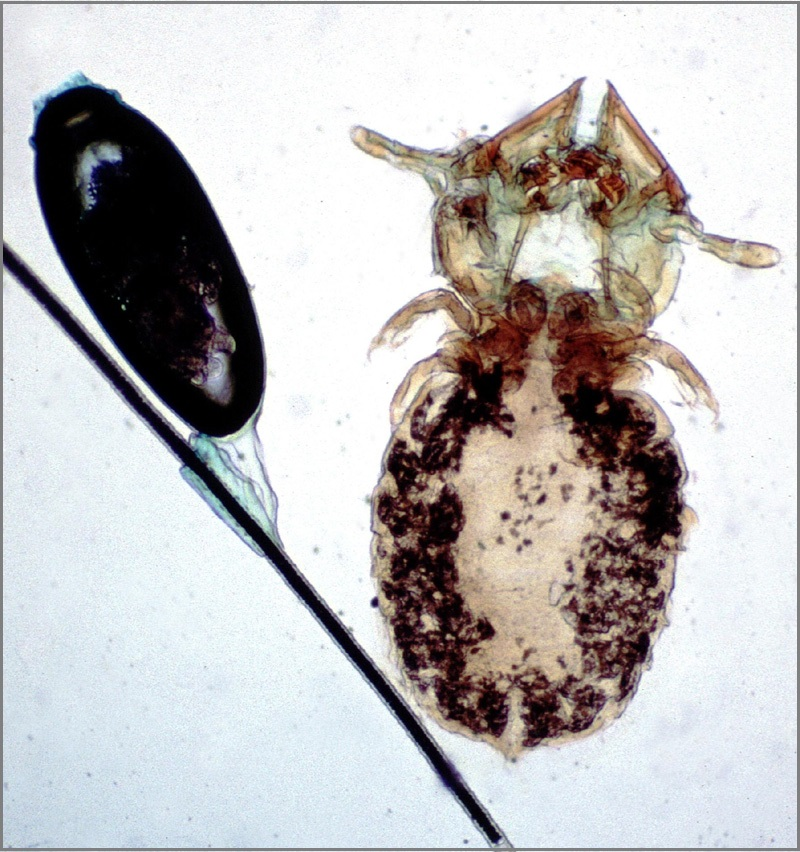
- Felicola sp. with egg

Scientific classification
- Kingdom: Animalia
- Phylum: Arthropoda
- Clade: Pancrustacea
- Class: Insecta
- Order: Psocodea
- Suborder: Troctomorpha
- Infraorder: Phthiraptera
- Parvorder: Trichodectera
- Family: Trichodectidae; Kellogg, 1896

Type genus
- Trichodectes Nitzsch, 1818

= Trichodectidae =

Family of lice

Trichodectidae is a family of louse in the parvorder Trichodectera. Its species are parasites of mammals.

== Classification ==
Trichodectidae was previously classified as belonging to Ischnocera, but phylogenetic studies had found that group to be paraphyletic. In 2021, de Moya et al. proposed that Trichodectidae be split off from Ischnocera and to be put into a newly created grouping called Trichodectera.

Below is a cladogram showing the position of Trichodectidae within Phthiraptera:

- Phthiraptera
  - - Ischnocera
      Philopteridae
    - - - Anoplura
        - Rhynchophthirina
      - Trichodectera
        Trichodectidae
  - Amblycera

== List of genera ==
The following 19 genera are recognized:

- Bovicola Ewing, 1929
- Cebidicola Bedford, 1936
- Damalinia Mjöberg, 1910
- Dasyonyx Bedford, 1932
- Eurytrichodectes Stobbe, 1913
- Eutrichophilus Mjöberg, 1910
- Felicola Ewing, 1929
- Geomydoecus Ewing, 1929
- Lutridia Kéler, 1938
- Neotrichodectes Ewing, 1929
- Paratrichodectes Lyal, 1985
- Procavicola Bedford, 1932
- Procaviphilus Bedford, 1932
- Protelicola Bedford, 1932
- Stachiella Kéler, 1938
- Thomomydoecus Price & Emerson, 1972
- Trichodectes Nitzsch, 1818
- Tricholipeurus Bedford, 1929
- Werneckodectes Conci, 1946
