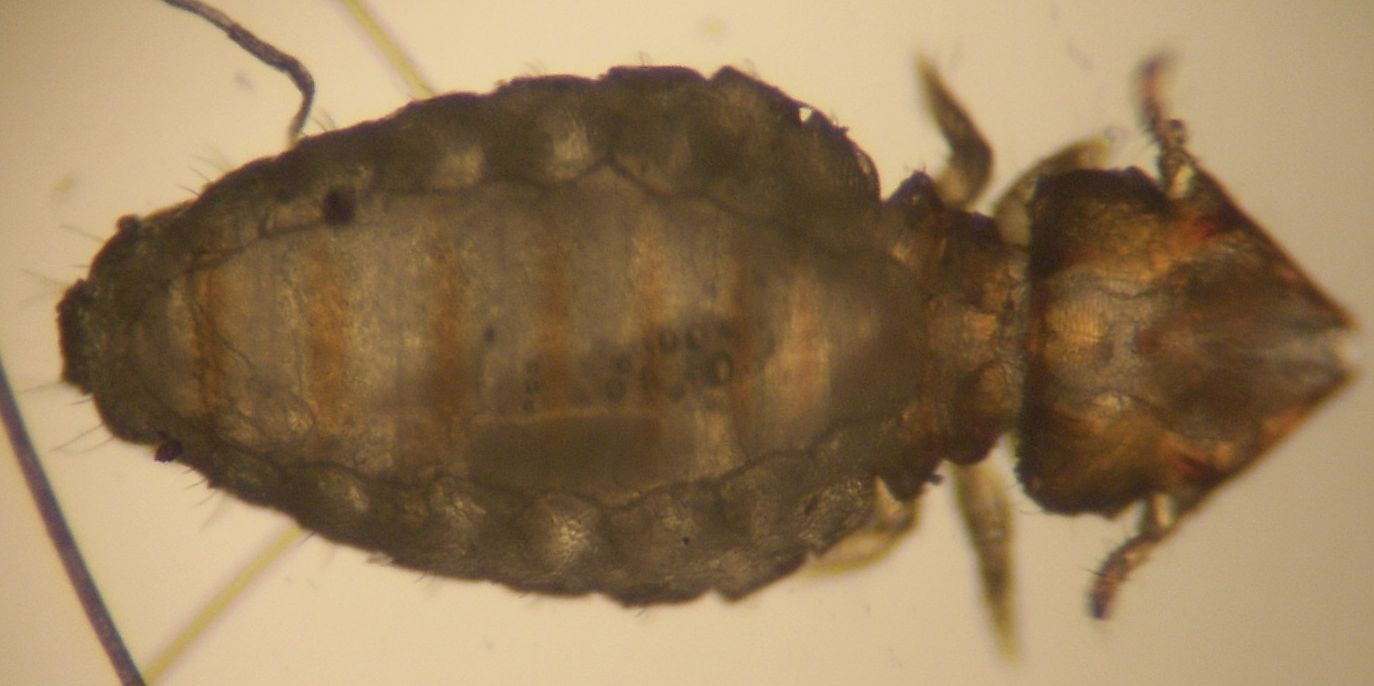
- Felicola subrostratus

Scientific classification
- Kingdom: Animalia
- Phylum: Arthropoda
- Class: Insecta
- Order: Psocodea
- Infraorder: Phthiraptera
- Section: Mallophaga; Nitzsch, 1818

= Mallophaga =

Suborder of lice

The Mallophaga are a possibly paraphyletic section of lice, known as chewing lice, biting lice, or bird lice, containing more than 3000 species. These lice are external parasites that feed mainly on birds, although some species also feed on mammals. They infest both domestic and wild mammals and birds, and cause considerable irritation to their hosts. They have paurometabolis or incomplete metamorphosis.

== Characteristics ==
About 3000 species of Mallophaga are in the world. They are easily identifiable by their heads, which are wider than their prothoraces. Species that feed on birds usually have two claws at the tip of each tarsus, while those that feed on mammals usually have only one claw.

Mallophaga have mandibulate mouthparts which are located on the ventral side of their heads. They use these mouthparts to feed on feathers, hair, and epidermal skin scales. Some species also use these mouthparts to feed on blood, which they obtain by piercing the pulp of young feathers or by gnawing through the skin.

== Lifecycle ==
Mallophaga develop by gradual metamorphosis. Females typically lay 150–300 eggs over an interval of 2–3 weeks. The eggs, commonly known as nits, are oblong and around 1 mm long. The eggs are glued to the hairs or feathers of the host with a secretion from the female accessory glands. The eggs typically hatch several days or up to three weeks from the time they are laid. The nymphs that hatch from the eggs resemble the adults except for their smaller size and lighter color. These nymphs go through three nymphal instars during a 2–3-week period. After these three instars, they are considered adults. Most adult species are light tan to brown in color and are usually 1–4 mm in length, although some livestock species can grow to be 5–7 mm, and some wild bird species can even get to 10 mm.

Mallophaga are often adapted to live on a specific part of their host and typically spend their entire lives on a single host. They can only survive for about three days after their host has died, and they typically use phoresis, which is hitching a ride from a fly, as an attempt to reach a new host. Mallophaga may also use the phoresis to spread to a new host even if the present one is still alive.

== Taxonomy ==
There are three subordinate taxa:

- Amblycera
- Ischnocera
- Rhynchophthirina
