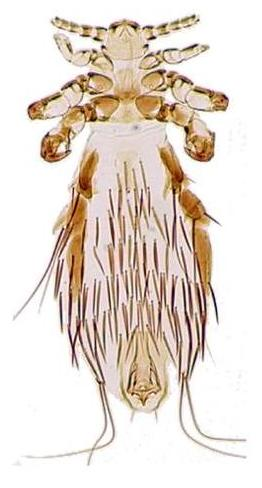
- Light micrograph of Fahrenholzia pinnata

Scientific classification
- Kingdom: Animalia
- Phylum: Arthropoda
- Clade: Pancrustacea
- Class: Insecta
- Order: Psocodea
- Suborder: Troctomorpha
- Infraorder: Phthiraptera; Haeckel, 1896

Parvorders
- Amblycera; Anoplura; Rhynchophthirina; Ischnocera; Trichodectera?

= Louse =

Phthiraptera Temporal range: Cenomanian–present

Infraorder of insects

Louse (pl.: lice) is the common name for any member of the infraorder Phthiraptera, which contains nearly 5,000 species of wingless parasitic insects. Phthiraptera was previously recognized as an order, until a 2021 genetic study determined that they are a highly modified lineage of the order Psocodea, whose members are commonly known as booklice, barklice or barkflies.

Lice are obligate parasites, living externally on warm-blooded hosts, which include most species of bird and mammal, notably excluding monotremes, pangolins, bats, sirenians, tapirs, rhinoceroses, and members of the clade and suborder Whippomorpha (Cetaceans and Hippopotamids). Chewing lice live among the hairs or feathers of their host and feed on skin and debris, whereas sucking lice pierce the host's skin and feed on blood and other secretions. They usually spend their whole life on a single host, cementing their eggs, called nits, to hairs or feathers. The eggs hatch into nymphs, which moult three times before becoming fully grown, a process that takes about four weeks.

Humans host two species of louse—the head louse and the body louse are subspecies of Pediculus humanus; and the pubic louse, Pthirus pubis. Lice are vectors of diseases such as typhus. Lice were ubiquitous in human society until at least the Middle Ages. They appear in folktales, songs such as The Kilkenny Louse House, and novels such as James Joyce's Finnegans Wake.

The body louse has the smallest genome of any known insect; it has been used as a model organism and has been the subject of much research. They commonly feature in the psychiatric disorder delusional parasitosis. A louse was one of the early subjects of microscopy, appearing in Robert Hooke's 1667 book, Micrographia.

The oldest known fossil lice are from the Cretaceous.

== Classification ==
Lice are classified as an infraorder called Phthiraptera, named by Ernst Haeckel in 1896. Phthiraptera was previously recognized as an order, and was considered the sister taxon to the order Psocoptera, which contains booklice, barklice and barkflies, all within the greater group called Psocodea. However, a 2021 genetic study determined that Phthiraptera lice are a highly modified lineage within the Psocoptera group, thus rendering Psocoptera paraphyletic and necessating a classification change. Phthiraptera is now nested within the suborder Troctomorpha, belonging to the now-ranked order Psocodea. Within Psocodea, the Phthiraptera lice are most closely related to family Liposcelididae.

A cladogram showing the position of Phthiraptera within Psocodea is shown below:

- Psocodea
  - - Troctomorpha
      - - - Phthiraptera
            - - Philopteridae
              - - - Anoplura
                  - Rhynchophthirina
                - Trichodectidae
            - Amblycera
          - Liposcelididae
        - - Pachytroctidae
          - Sphaeropsocidae
      - Amphientometae
    - Psocomorpha
      - - - Homilopsocidea
          - Caeciliusetae
        - - - Psocetae
            - Epipsocetae
          - Philotarsetae
      - Archipsocetae
  - Trogiomorpha
    - - Atropetae
      - Psyllipsocetae
    - Prionoglaridetae (paraphyletic)

=== Internal classification ===
Phthiraptera is a monophyletic grouping, united as the members are by a number of derived features, including their parasitism on warm-blooded vertebrates and the combination of their metathoracic ganglia with their abdominal ganglia to form a single ventral nerve junction.

The order has traditionally been divided into two suborders, the sucking lice (Anoplura) and the chewing lice (Mallophaga). However, subsequent classifications indicated that the Mallophaga are paraphyletic, and four suborders were then recognized.

Upon finding that Phthiraptera was nested within Psocoptera in 2021, de Moya et al. reduced the rank of Phthiraptera to infraorder, and the suborders were reduced down to parvorder. Also, based on the paraphyletic nature of one of the parvorders - Ischnocera - they recognised a fifth parvorder Trichodectera, which had been split off from Ischnocera two years earlier. Here are the five proposed parvorders within Phthiraptera:

- Amblycera: primitive chewing lice, widespread on birds, and also occurring on South American and Australian mammals
- Anoplura: sucking lice, occurring on mammals exclusively
- Rhynchophthirina: parasites of elephants and warthogs
- Ischnocera: avian chewing lice, and contains the large family Philopteridae
- Trichodectera: parasitizing mammals, split off from Ischnocera, and contains the family Trichodectidae

=== Evolutionary history ===
The oldest confirmed fossil louse is Archimenopon myanmarensis, an amblyceran from the Cretaceous amber from Myanmar. Another early representative of the group is a bird louse, Megamenopon rasnitsyni, from Eckfelder Maar, Germany, which dates to the Eocene, around 44 million years ago. Saurodectes vrsanskyi from the Early Cretaceous (Aptian) Zaza Formation of Buryatia, Russia, has also been suggested to be a louse, but this is tentative.

Placental mammal lice had a single common ancestor that lived on Afrotheria with this arising from host-switching from an ancient avian host.

== Description ==
Nearly 5,000 species of louse have been identified, about 4,000 being parasitic on birds and 800 on mammals. Lice are present on every continent in all the habitats that their host animals occupy. They are found even in the Antarctic, where penguins carry 15 species of lice (in the genera Austrogonoides and Nesiotinus).

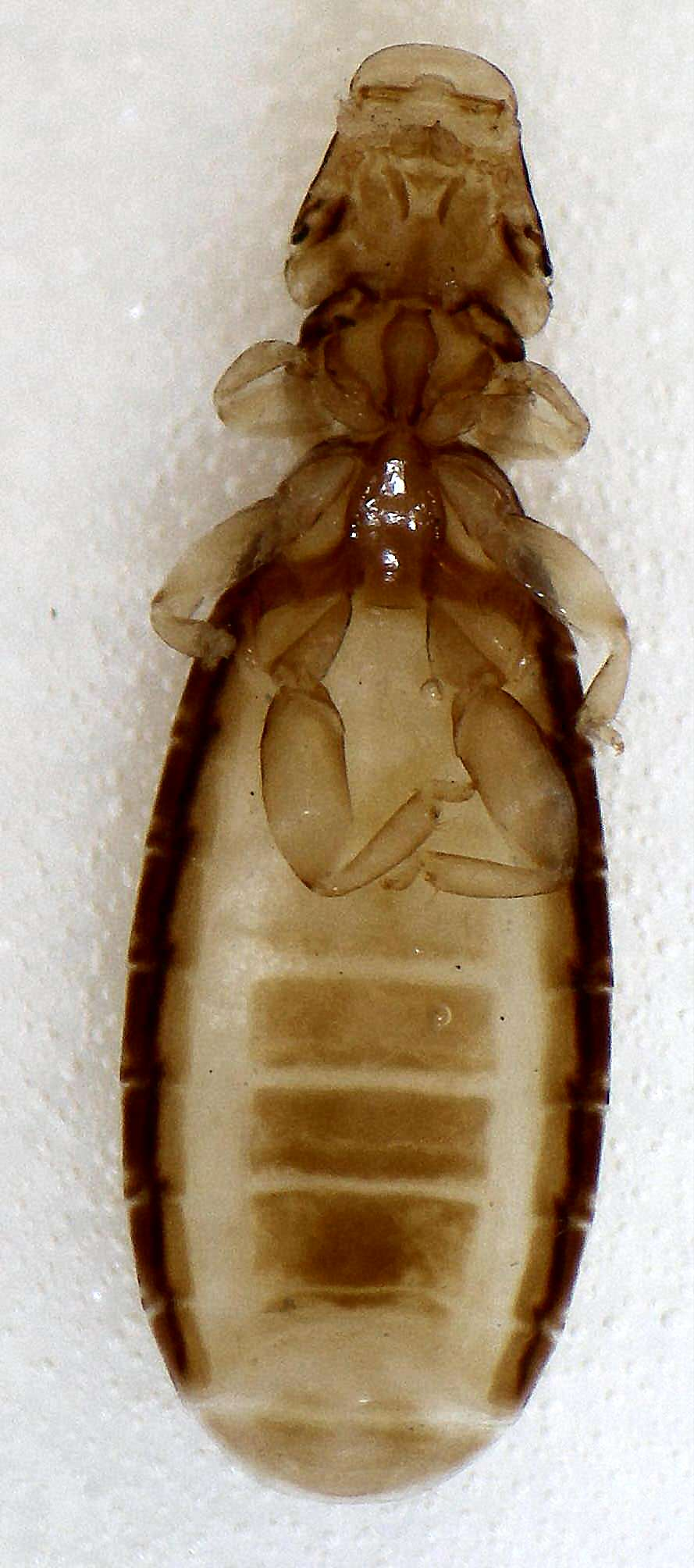
Ricinus bombycillae, an amblyceran louse from a Bohemian waxwing

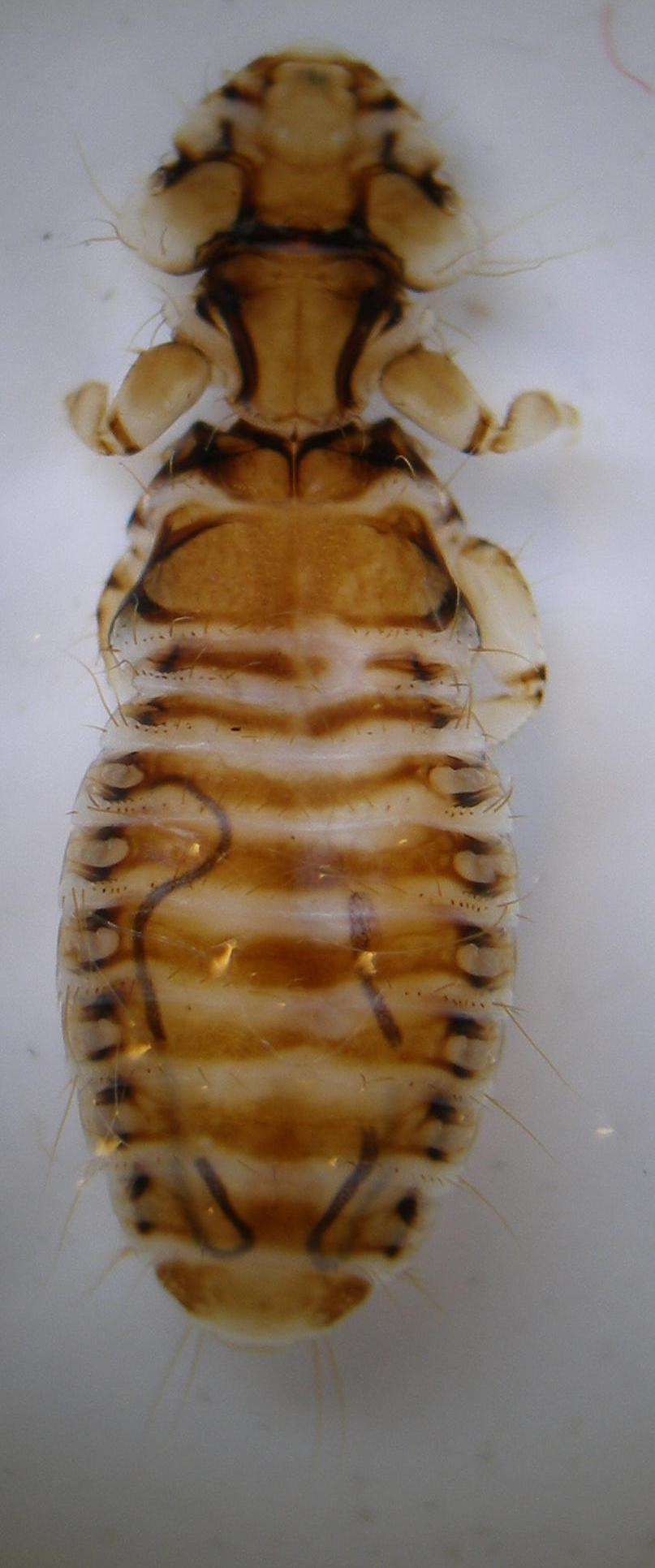
Trinoton anserinum, an amblyceran louse from a mute swan

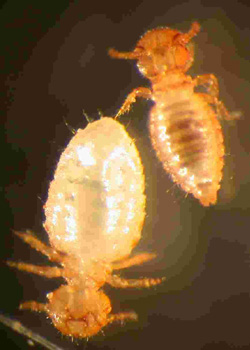
Bovicola limbata, an ischnoceran louse from goats. The species is sexually dimorphic, with the male smaller than the female.

Lice are divided into two groups: sucking lice, which obtain their nourishment from feeding on the sebaceous secretions and body fluids of their host; and chewing lice, which are scavengers, feeding on skin, fragments of feathers or hair, and debris found on the host's body. Many lice are specific to a single species of host and have co-evolved with it. In some cases, they live on only a particular part of the body. Some animals are known to host up to fifteen different species, although one to three is typical for mammals, and two to six for birds. Lice generally cannot survive for long if removed from their host. If their host dies, lice can opportunistically use phoresis to hitch a ride on a fly and attempt to find a new host.

Sucking lice range in length from 0.5 to 5 mm (1/64 to 13/64 in). They have narrow heads and oval, flattened bodies. They have no ocelli, and their compound eyes are reduced in size or absent. Their antennae are short with three to five segments, and their mouthparts, which are retractable into their head, are adapted for piercing and sucking. There is a cibarial pump at the start of the gut; it is powered by muscles attached to the inside of the cuticle of the head. The mouthparts consist of a proboscis which is toothed, and a set of stylets arranged in a cylinder inside the proboscis, containing a salivary canal (ventrally) and a food canal (dorsally). The thoracic segments are fused, the abdominal segments are separate, and there is a single large claw at the tip of each of the six legs.

Chewing lice are also flattened and can be slightly larger than sucking lice, ranging in length from 0.5 to 6 mm (1/64 to 15/64 in). They are similar to sucking lice in form but the head is wider than the thorax and all species have compound eyes. There are no ocelli and the mouthparts are adapted for chewing. The antennae have three to five segments and are slender in the suborder Ischnocera, but club-shaped in the suborder Amblycera. The legs are short and robust, and terminated by one or two claws. Some species of chewing lice house symbiotic bacteria in bacteriocytes in their bodies. These may assist in digestion because if the insect is deprived of them, it will die. Lice are usually cryptically coloured to match the fur or feathers of the host. A louse's colour varies from pale beige to dark grey; however, if feeding on blood, it may become considerably darker.

Female lice are usually more common than males, and some species are parthenogenetic, with young developing from unfertilized eggs. A louse's egg is commonly called a nit. Many lice attach their eggs to their hosts' hair with specialized saliva; the saliva/hair bond is very difficult to sever without specialized products. Lice inhabiting birds, however, may simply leave their eggs in parts of the body inaccessible to preening, such as the interior of feather shafts. Living louse eggs tend to be pale whitish, whereas dead louse eggs are yellower. Lice are exopterygotes, being born as miniature versions of the adult, known as nymphs. The young moult three times before reaching the final adult form, usually within a month after hatching.

Humans host three different kinds of lice: head lice, body lice, and pubic lice. Head lice and body lice are subspecies of Pediculus humanus, and pubic lice are a separate species, Pthirus pubis. Lice infestations can be controlled with lice combs, and medicated shampoos or washes.

== Ecology ==
The average number of lice per host tends to be higher in large-bodied bird species than in small ones. Lice have an aggregated distribution across bird individuals, i.e. most lice live on a few birds, while most birds are relatively free of lice. This pattern is more pronounced in territorial than in colonial—more social—bird species. Host organisms that dive under water to feed on aquatic prey harbour fewer taxa of lice. Bird taxa that are capable of exerting stronger antiparasitic defence—such as stronger T cell immune response or larger uropygial glands—harbour more taxa of Amblyceran lice than others. Reductions in the size of host populations may cause a long-lasting reduction of louse taxonomic richness, for example, birds introduced into New Zealand host fewer species of lice there than in Europe. The extinction of a species results in the extinction of its host-specific lice. Host-switching is a random event that would seem very rarely likely to be successful, but speciation has occurred over evolutionary time-scales so it must be successfully accomplished sometimes.

Lice may reduce host life expectancy if the infestation is heavy, but most seem to have little effect on their host. The habit of dust bathing in domestic hens is probably an attempt by the birds to rid themselves of lice. Lice may transmit microbial diseases and helminth parasites, but most individuals spend their whole life cycle on a single host and are only able to transfer to a new host opportunistically. Ischnoceran lice may reduce the thermoregulation effect of the plumage; thus heavily infested birds lose more heat than others. Lice infestation is a disadvantage in the context of sexual rivalry.

== Reproduction ==
Most louse species reproduce sexually, only a few parthenogenetic species are known. They lay eggs, also called nits. After hatching, they develop through three larval (=nymphal) stages into adults (=imagoes). Their sex ratios are more balanced in more social hosts and more female-biased in less social hosts, presumably due to the stronger isolation among louse subpopulations (living on separate birds) in the latter case. Their sex determination system is paternal genome elimination, i.e., males are functionally haploid. They appear to manipulate offspring sex ratios as predicted by Hamilton's local mate competition hypothesis.

== In human culture ==
=== In social history ===
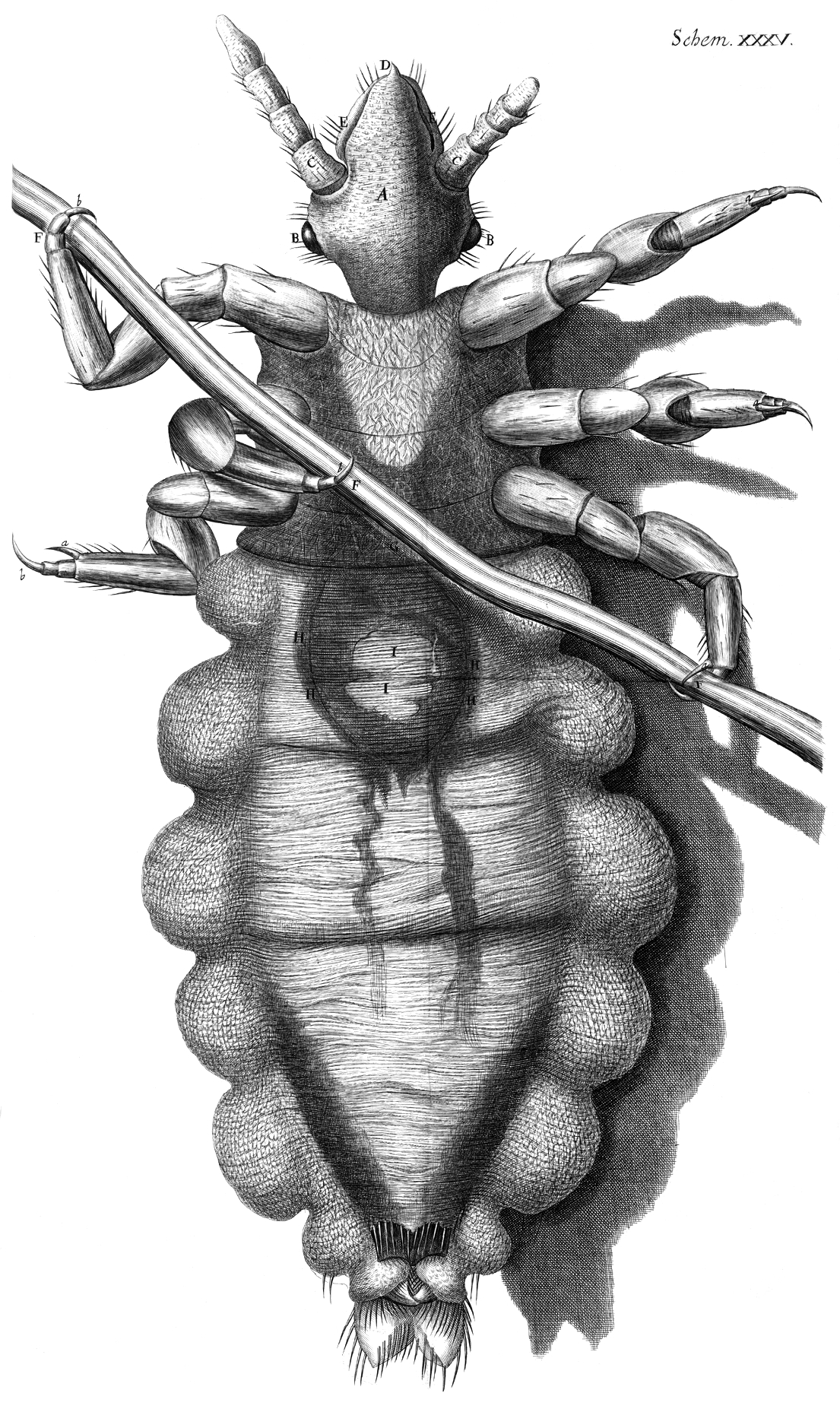
Drawing of a louse clinging to a human hair. Robert Hooke, Micrographia, 1667

Lice have been intimately associated with human society throughout history. In the Middle Ages, they were essentially ubiquitous. At the death of Thomas Becket, Archbishop of Canterbury in 1170, it was recorded that "The vermin boiled over like water in a simmering cauldron, and the onlookers burst into alternate weeping and laughing". The clergy often saw lice and other parasites as a constant reminder of human frailty and weakness. Monks and nuns would purposely ignore grooming themselves and suffer from infestations to express their religious devotion. A mediaeval treatment for lice was an ointment made from pork grease, incense, lead, and aloe.

Robert Hooke's 1667 book, Micrographia: or some physiological descriptions of minute bodies made by magnifying glasses with observations and Inquiries thereupon, illustrated a human louse, drawn as seen down an early microscope.

Margaret Cavendish's satirical The Description of a New World, Called The Blazing-World (1668) has "Lice-men" as "mathematicians", investigating nature by trying to weigh the air like the real scientist Robert Boyle.

In 1935 the Harvard medical researcher Hans Zinsser wrote the book Rats, Lice and History, alleging that both body and head lice transmit typhus between humans. Despite this, the modern view is that only the body louse can transmit the disease.

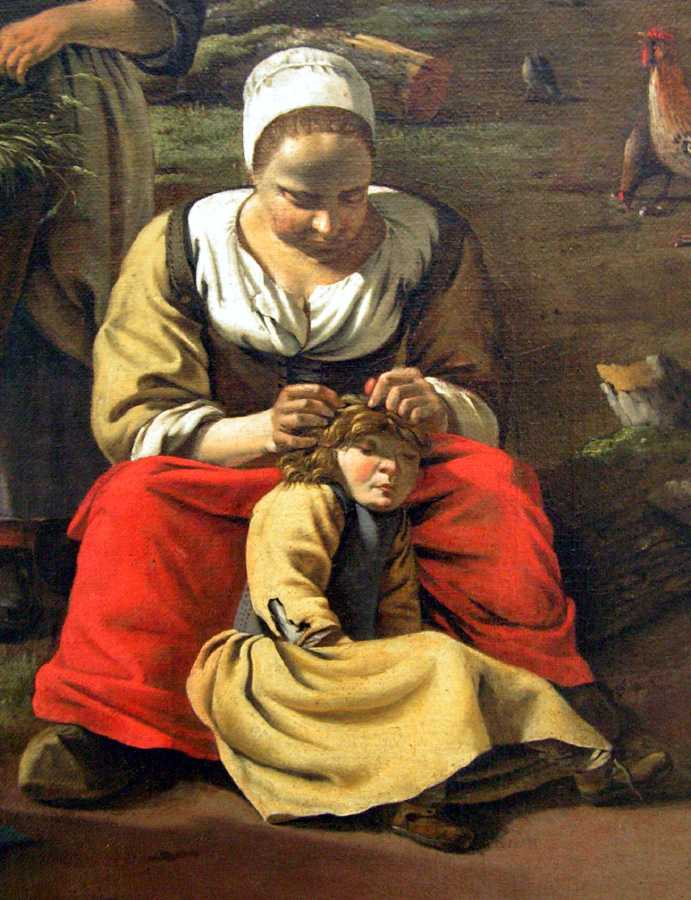
Detail showing delousing from Jan Siberechts' painting Cour de ferme ("Farmyard"), 1662

Soldiers in the trenches of the First World War suffered severely from lice, and the typhus they carried. The Germans boasted that they had lice under effective control, but themselves suffered badly from lice in the Second World War on the Eastern Front, especially in the Battle of Stalingrad. "Delousing" became a euphemism for the extermination of Jews in concentration camps such as Auschwitz under the Nazi regime.

In the psychiatric disorder delusional parasitosis, patients express a persistent irrational fear of animals such as lice and mites, imagining that they are continually infested and complaining of itching, with "an unshakable false belief that live organisms are present in the skin".

=== In literature and folklore ===
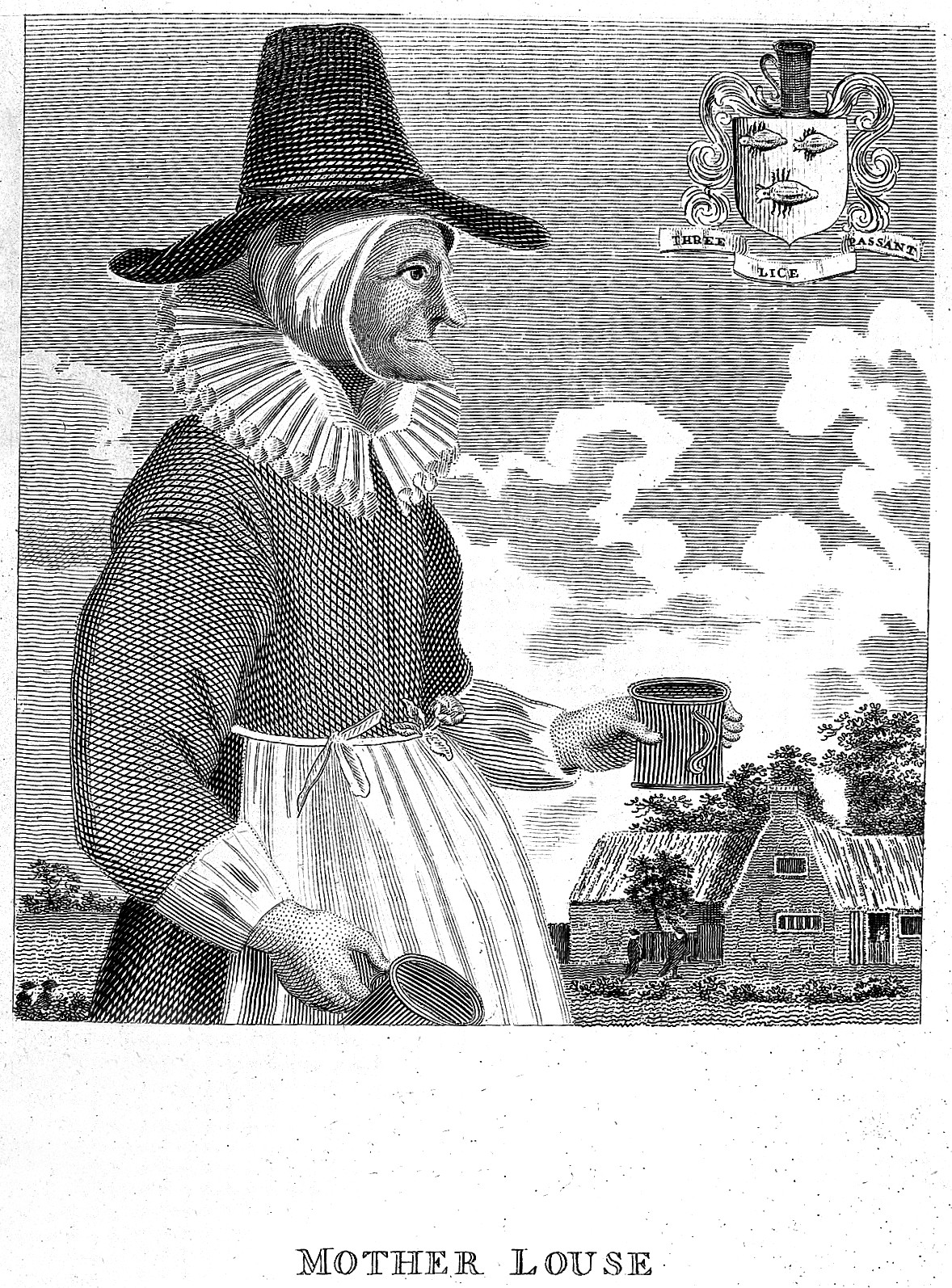
Mother Louse, a notorious alewife in Oxford during the mid-18th century, shown with three lice as a coat of arms. Image by David Loggan.

James Joyce's 1939 book Finnegans Wake has the character Shem the Penman infested with "foxtrotting fleas, the lieabed lice, ... bats in his belfry".

Clifford E. Trafzer's A Chemehuevi Song: The Resilience of a Southern Paiute Tribe retells the story of Sinawavi (Coyote)'s love for Poowavi (Louse). Her eggs are sealed in a basket woven by her mother, who gives it to Coyote, instructing him not to open it before he reaches home. Hearing voices coming from it, however, Coyote opens the basket and the people, the world's first human beings, pour out of it in all directions.

The Irish songwriter John Lyons (b. 1934) wrote the popular song The Kilkenny Louse House. The song contains the lines "Well we went up the stairs and we put out the light, Sure in less than five minutes, I had to show fight. For the fleas and the bugs they collected to march, And over me stomach they formed a great arch". It has been recorded by Christie Purcell (1952), Mary Delaney on From Puck to Appleby (2003), and the Dubliners on Double Dubliners (1972) among others.

Robert Burns dedicated a poem to the louse, inspired by witnessing one on a lady's bonnet in church: "Ye ugly, creepin, blastid wonner, Detested, shunn'd, by saint and sinner, How dare ye set your fit upon her, sae fine lady! Gae somewhere else, and seek your dinner on some poor body." John Milton in Paradise Lost mentioned the biblical plague of lice visited upon pharaoh: "Frogs, lice, and flies must all his palace fill with loathed intrusion, and filled all the land." John Ray recorded a Scottish proverb, "Gie a beggar a bed and he'll repay you with a Louse." In Shakespeare's Troilus and Cressida, Thersites compares Menelaus, brother of Agamemnon, to a louse: "Ask me not what I would be, if I were not Thersites; for I care not to be the louse of a lazar, so I were not Menelaus."

=== In science ===
The human body louse Pediculus humanus humanus has the smallest insect genome known, and this louse can transmit certain diseases that the closely related human head louse (P. h. capitis) cannot. With their simple life history and small genomes, the pair make ideal model organisms to study the molecular mechanisms behind the transmission of pathogens and vector competence.

Lice have been the subject of significant DNA research in the 2000s that led to discoveries on human evolution. The three species of sucking lice that parasitize human beings belong to two genera, Pediculus and Pthirus: head lice (Pediculus humanus capitis), body lice (Pediculus humanus humanus), and pubic lice (Pthirus pubis). Human head and body lice (genus Pediculus) share a common ancestor with chimpanzee lice, while pubic lice (genus Pthirus) share a common ancestor with gorilla lice. Using phylogenetic and cophylogenetic analysis, Reed et al. hypothesized that Pediculus and Pthirus are sister taxa and monophyletic. In other words, the two genera descended from the same common ancestor. The age of divergence between Pediculus and its common ancestor is estimated to be 6-7 million years ago, which matches the age predicted by chimpanzee-hominid divergence. Because parasites rely on their hosts, host–parasite cospeciation events are likely.

Genetic evidence suggests that human ancestors acquired pubic lice from gorillas approximately 3-4 million years ago. Unlike the genus Pediculus, the divergence in Pthirus does not match the age of host divergence that likely occurred 7 million years ago. Reed et al. propose a Pthirus species host-switch around 3-4 million years ago. While it is difficult to determine if a parasite–host switch occurred in evolutionary history, this explanation is the most parsimonious (containing the fewest evolutionary changes).

Additionally, the DNA differences between head lice and body lice provide corroborating evidence that humans used clothing between 80,000 and 170,000 years ago, before leaving Africa. Human head and body lice occupy distinct ecological zones: head lice live and feed on the scalp, while body lice live on clothing and feed on the body. Because body lice require clothing to survive, the divergence of head and body lice from their common ancestor provides an estimate of the date of introduction of clothing in human evolutionary history.

The mitochondrial genome of the human species of the body louse (Pediculus humanus humanus), the head louse (Pediculus humanus capitis) and the pubic louse (Pthirus pubis) fragmented into a number of minichromosomes at least seven million years ago. Analysis of mitochondrial DNA in human body and hair lice reveals that greater genetic diversity existed in African than in non-African lice. Human lice can also shed light on human migratory patterns in prehistory. The dominating theory of anthropologists regarding human migration is the Out of Africa Hypothesis. Genetic diversity accumulates over time, and mutations occur at a relatively constant rate. Because there is more genetic diversity in African lice, the lice and their human hosts must have existed in Africa before anywhere else.

=== Woodlouse ===
The name woodlouse or wood-louse is given to crustaceans of the suborder Oniscidea within the order Isopoda, unrelated to lice. The Oxford English Dictionary's earliest citation of this usage is from 1611.

== See also ==
- Pest (organism)
- Use of DNA in forensic entomology
