= Lemurpediculus robbinsi =

Scientific classification
- Domain: Eukaryota
- Kingdom: Animalia
- Phylum: Arthropoda
- Class: Insecta
- Order: Psocodea
- Family: Polyplacidae
- Genus: Lemurpediculus
- Species: L. robbinsi

Binomial name
- Lemurpediculus robbinsi Durden, Blanco & Seabolt, 2017

Species of louse

Lemurpediculus robbinsi is an ectoparasite of Crossley's dwarf lemur, Cheirogaleus crossleyi A. Grandidier, in Madagascar. Both sexes of the louse species are distinct from the two previously known species of Lemurpediculus, L. verruculosus (Ward) and L. petterorum Paulian.

Crossley's dwarf lemur is endangered, so its obligate parasites must also be considered endangered.

Lemurpediculus robbinsi is not yet known to be a vector of pathogens or parasites to its host.

== Morphology ==
Lemurpediculus robbinsi is morphologically similar to other Lemurpediculus species, but can be taxonomically separated from them based on the shape of the subgenital plate of the female and the shape of the genitalia of the male.
