= Mayor's mouse =

Conservation status
- Vulnerable (IUCN 3.1)

Scientific classification
- Kingdom: Animalia
- Phylum: Chordata
- Class: Mammalia
- Order: Rodentia
- Family: Muridae
- Genus: Mus
- Subgenus: Coelomys
- Species: M. mayori

Binomial name
- Mus mayori (Thomas, 1915)

Subspecies
- Mus mayori mayori Mus mayori pococki
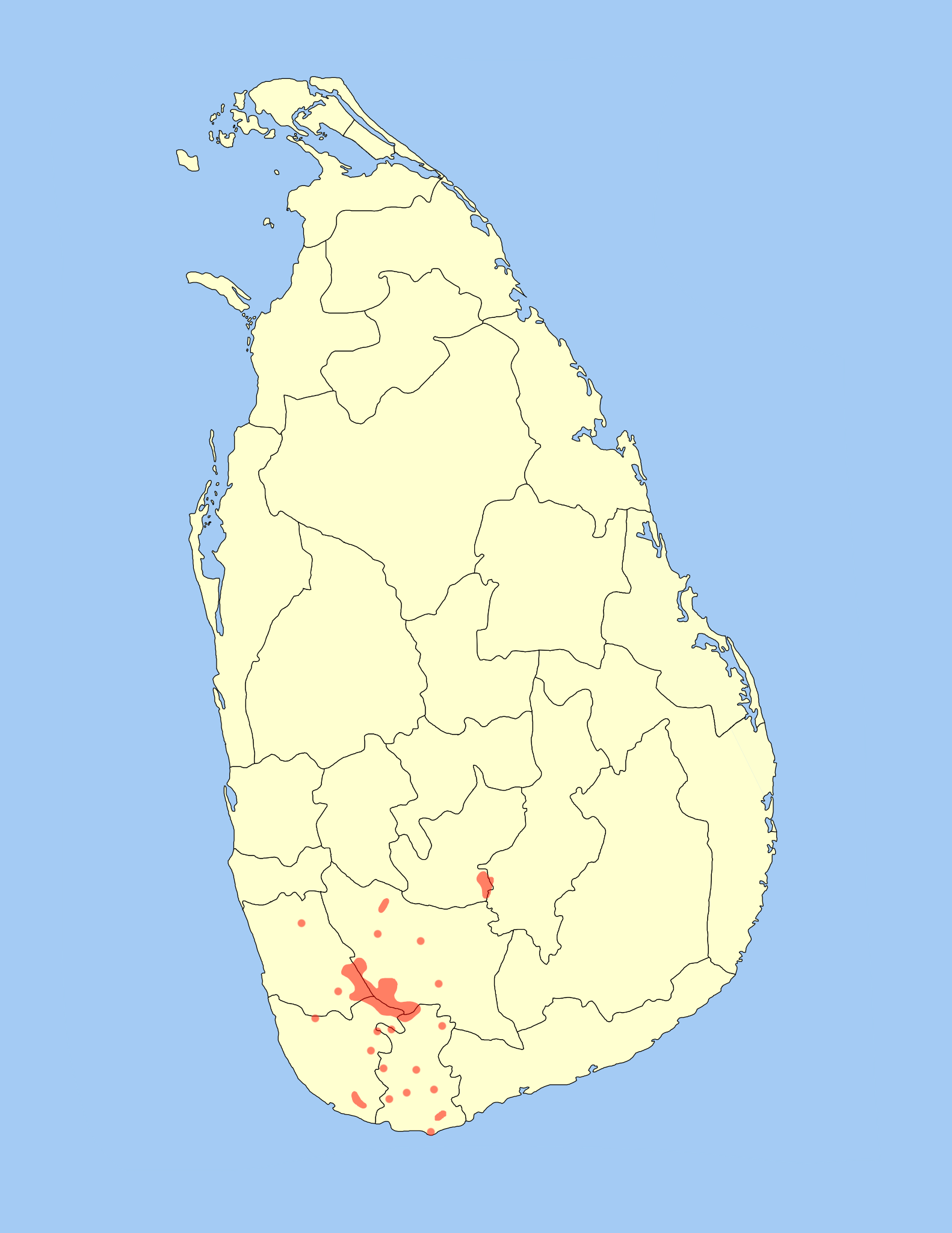

Species of rodent

Mus mayori is a species of rodent in the genus Mus, the mice. Its common names include Mayor's mouse, highland rat, and spiny mouse. It is endemic to Sri Lanka.

This mouse lives in tropical and subtropical forest types and wet grassland habitat. It is fossorial, seeking shelter by digging burrows. It is nocturnal.

This species is widespread in parts of Sri Lanka but it faces a number of threats, including deforestation and domestic cats.

There are two subspecies, M. m. mayori and M. m. pococki. A recent study catalogued the parasites associated with subspecies pococki: a mite of genus Echinolaelaps, a tick of genus Ixodes, and the sucking louse Polyplax spinulosa. A new species of pseudoscorpion was found on the mouse, described, and named Megachernes kanneliyensis. The mouse also carries the native Sri Lankan flea Stivalius phoberus.
