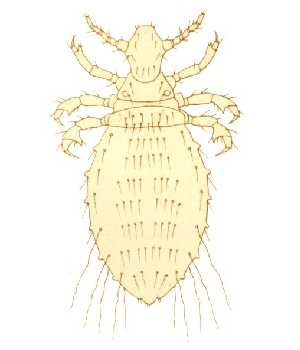

Scientific classification
- Kingdom: Animalia
- Phylum: Arthropoda
- Clade: Pancrustacea
- Class: Insecta
- Order: Psocodea
- Infraorder: Phthiraptera
- Family: Linognathidae
- Genus: Solenopotes
- Species: S. capillatus

Binomial name
- Solenopotes capillatus Enderlein, 1904

= Solenopotes capillatus =

Species of louse

Solenopotes capillatus is known as the little blue cattle louse in the United States and the tubercle-bearing louse in Australia. This louse is the smallest of the sucking lice that occur on cattle and is a relatively immobile species. They are found all around the world in distribution but are restricted mainly to areas with domestic livestock. The little blue cattle louse is most often found on the head of its host, primarily the face and jaw region, but sporadically is found on other body parts. It is relatively immobile so typically will not relocate on its host's body. The louse is spread by direct contact and is considered an ectoparasite.

Symptomatically this louse can cause irritation, restlessness, and possibly a decrease in milk production. The louse is also known to cause alopecia from scratching that can lead to infection. Heavy infestation can cause anemia from blood loss.

The louse's life cycle consists of three instars and for completion of the cycle, from egg to egg, is between 27 and 29 days. The adult louse has a short broad head, broad sensorial on segments 4 and 5 of its antennae. It has a hexagonal shaped sternal plate on the thorax and prominent abdominal spiracles. Its hind and middle legs are the same length while its front tarsal claws smaller.
