= Lemurpediculus verruculosus =

Scientific classification
- Domain: Eukaryota
- Kingdom: Animalia
- Phylum: Arthropoda
- Class: Insecta
- Order: Psocodea
- Family: Polyplacidae
- Genus: Lemurpediculus
- Species: L. verruculosus

Binomial name
- Lemurpediculus verruculosus (Ward, 1951)

Synonyms
- Lemurphthirus verruculosus Ward, 1951

Species of louse

Lemurpediculus verruculosus is an ectoparasite that is found on Microcebus rufus, a mouse lemur of southeastern Madagascar. It is a type of sucking louse that is found on the external ears of the mouse lemur due to the rich peripheral blood supply and sparse fur. The mouse lemur M. rufus is the only known host to this particular sucking louse, and infestations range from light to fairly heavy on the ears. The exact effect these lice have on the host is largely unknown.

Previously, only female L. verruculosus lice were recovered during one of Harry Hoogstraal's collecting expeditions, making the female louse the better-described sex. However, it has been recently discovered that there are three sexes of this ectoparasite: male, female and an instar nymph which is morphologically and reproductively different from either male or female.

== Morphology ==
The general body shape, lack of paratergal plates, sternal and tergal abdominal plates, and wide separation of the leg coxae, are shared by both sexes and the nymph. The total body length is 0.870–0.945 millimetres (0.03–0.04 in), and males and females share a unique feature: a head that is well sclerotised, or hardened, anteriorly with broadly curved anterior margins. They have antennae that are segmented into five parts, with the first segment much larger than the other segments. There are two sutural (fused joint) head setae, four dorsal marginal head setae, two apical head setae, and one each of a dorsal anterior, central, posterior, principal, accessory, ventral, and preantennal head seta. The thorax is barely wider than the head and the forelegs are smaller than the mid and hindlegs. The abdomen is wider than the thorax, and it bears six spiracles on each side. Nymphs have a head that has a broadly rounded anterior margin and lacks a lateral notch anterior to the antennae. Its thorax is slightly wider than its head, with gently convex lateral margins. The most basal segment, or coxae, are subtriangular. Their abdomen has nine rows of two-dorsal central abdominal seta and one fairly long dorsal lateral abdominal seta.
