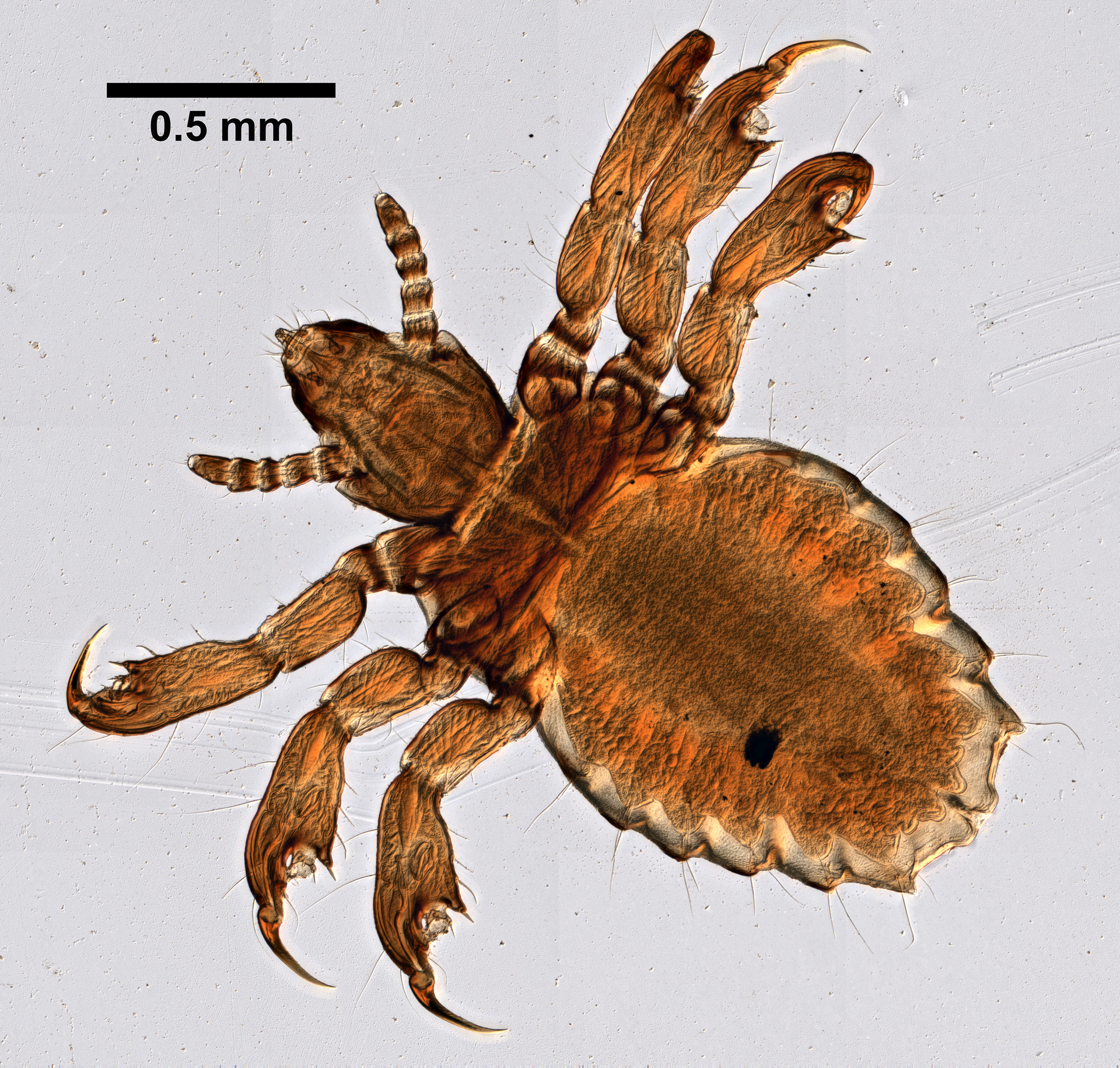

Scientific classification
- Kingdom: Animalia
- Phylum: Arthropoda
- Clade: Pancrustacea
- Class: Insecta
- Order: Psocodea
- Infraorder: Phthiraptera
- Family: Haematopinidae
- Genus: Haematopinus
- Species: H. suis

Binomial name
- Haematopinus suis (Linnaeus, 1758)

Synonyms
- Pediculus suis Linnaeus, 1758

= Haematopinus suis =

Species of louse

Haematopinus suis, the hog louse, is one of the largest members of the louse suborder Anoplura, which consists of sucking lice that commonly afflict a number of mammals. H. suis is found almost solely on the skin surface of swine, and takes several blood meals a day from its host. H. suis has large claws that enable it to grasp a hog's hair and move around its body. It is easily seen without magnification, being 5–6 millimetres (0.20–0.24 in) long. H. suis has a long, narrow head and long mouthparts adapted for sucking blood. It is the only louse found on swine. H. suis infestation is relatively rare in the US; a 2004 study found that about 14% of German swine farms had H. suis infestations. Due to the frequency of feeding, infested swine become severely irritated, often rubbing themselves to the point of injuring their skin and displacing body hair. Particularly afflicted hogs may become almost completely bald and, in young hogs, the resulting stress can arrest growth, a cause of concern for farmers.

== Adult morphology ==
=== Head ===
Haematopinus suis have relatively narrow heads with pointed fronts. The mouthparts of H. suis are contained in the labrum, with teeth at the tip. Within the labrum are four thin, retractable, perforating stylets (the fascicle) used for capillary sucking in the front. Of the stylets that compose the fascicle, two form the food channel, supported by the maxilla. Of the remaining two, one connects the salivary gland to the feeding site, and the other guides the other stylets and is flattened with a serrated tip. The heads have long lateral antennae. A defining feature of H. suis is the lack of maxillary palps typically found on other lice

=== Thorax ===
The thorax of H. suis is primarily for movement. The three pairs of legs are attached at the thorax. Each leg has large claws for grasping the hair of the host.

=== Abdomen ===
The abdomen of H. suis is black when blood-filled, wider than the thorax, and contains lateral spiracles for respiration. A defining characteristic of H. suis is the paratergal plates lining the sides of each segment of the abdomen. These plates almost completely line the abdomen, and are much larger and more prominent than those of other species of lice.

=== Gender differences ===
Female H. suis are larger than their male counterparts. Males also contain an aedeagus, a sperm-transferring organ.

== Eggs ==
Like many insects, H. suis is oviparous and iteroparous, meaning that development of the offspring occurs outside the mother's body (oviparous) and are produced in more than one group across multiple seasons (iteroparous). Female H. suis lay 3–6 eggs per day following a blood meal and mating, eventually laying about 90 eggs. The amber eggs are deposited on the lower half of the swine's side, or the neck, shoulders, flanks, or on the back of the ears. Lice eggs are commonly referred to as "nits". (Note: The term nit has given rise to much confusion. Many entomologists define nits as only hatched or nonviable eggs (dead embryo), while others include any egg, regardless of viability. Here, the broader definition of any egg is used for the term nit.) These nits have small holes for gas exchange, called opercula. Typically, eggs will hatch within 12–14 days, but this varies depending on temperature.

== Development and nymphs ==
The hog louse spends its entire life cycle on its host. The life cycle is completed in about 5 weeks. H. suis are hemimetabolous (gradual metamorphosis). The metamorphosis of hog lice includes 3 nymphal instars. Once hatched, young lice molt and move to tender areas of the body to feed. Nymphs tend to remain concentrated near the head region. After 10 days, the lice are sexually mature and ready to begin another life cycle.

== Lifespan ==
Haematopinus suis is a permanent parasite, meaning it spends its entire life cycle on the swine host. If a hog louse is ever removed from its host, the louse typically survives for only 2–3 days. If a louse remains on its host however, it will survive an average of 35 days.

== Behavior ==
=== Feeding ===
Haematopinus suis feeds only on its host swine's blood. It is classified as a solenophage, because its mouthparts burrow directly into a blood vessel to feed. The mouthparts of the hog louse cut into the hog's skin, and the stylet is then introduced into a blood vessel and begins to extract blood. The teeth of the labrum are used to cut the skin and anchor the louse to the hog, and the stylets move into the tissue, all while secreting saliva that acts as an anticoagulant. Once penetrated, the blood is sucked up the food channel by a mechanism located in the louse's head. The blood enters the digestive tract, where enzymes hemolyse erythrocytes (the blood is essentially disintegrated to keep it in liquid form); the hemolysation may also serve to inhibit disease transmission (i.e. bacterial infection).

=== Position on host ===
Nymphal H. suis spend most of their time in and around the head region of the hog, specifically the ears. As they mature, they move to other areas on the host's body, primarily the abdominal region.

=== Migration ===
Because it is a permanent parasite, the hog louse will only leave its host to move to another host, always swine. The most common migration of lice between hogs is via direct contact (i.e. sexual contact or close proximity). Lice can however, survive off-host for short periods of time, such as in pigs' bedding. Lice eggs are often found in hay and troughs.

== Veterinary relevance ==
Infestations of H. suis are not usually lethal to the hosts, but major economic losses are ascribed to impaired growth, general irritation, and immune responses to the lice. Estimated economic losses due to hog lice infections are from 10 to 50 million dollars a year. H. suis is the vector of swine pox in hogs. It also transmits hog cholera, considered the most important health concern for swine, hog lice being the second.

== Treatment and prevention ==
Because the louse have neither free-living stages nor vectors for infection of H. suis, control is difficult when using insecticides and quarantines. Sows can be treated with avermectin, a common therapy treating arthropods and nematodes, prior to farrowing to keep lice from moving to younger hogs. Pesticides such as amitraz, coumaphos, and fenthion can be used in hay bedding for prevention.
