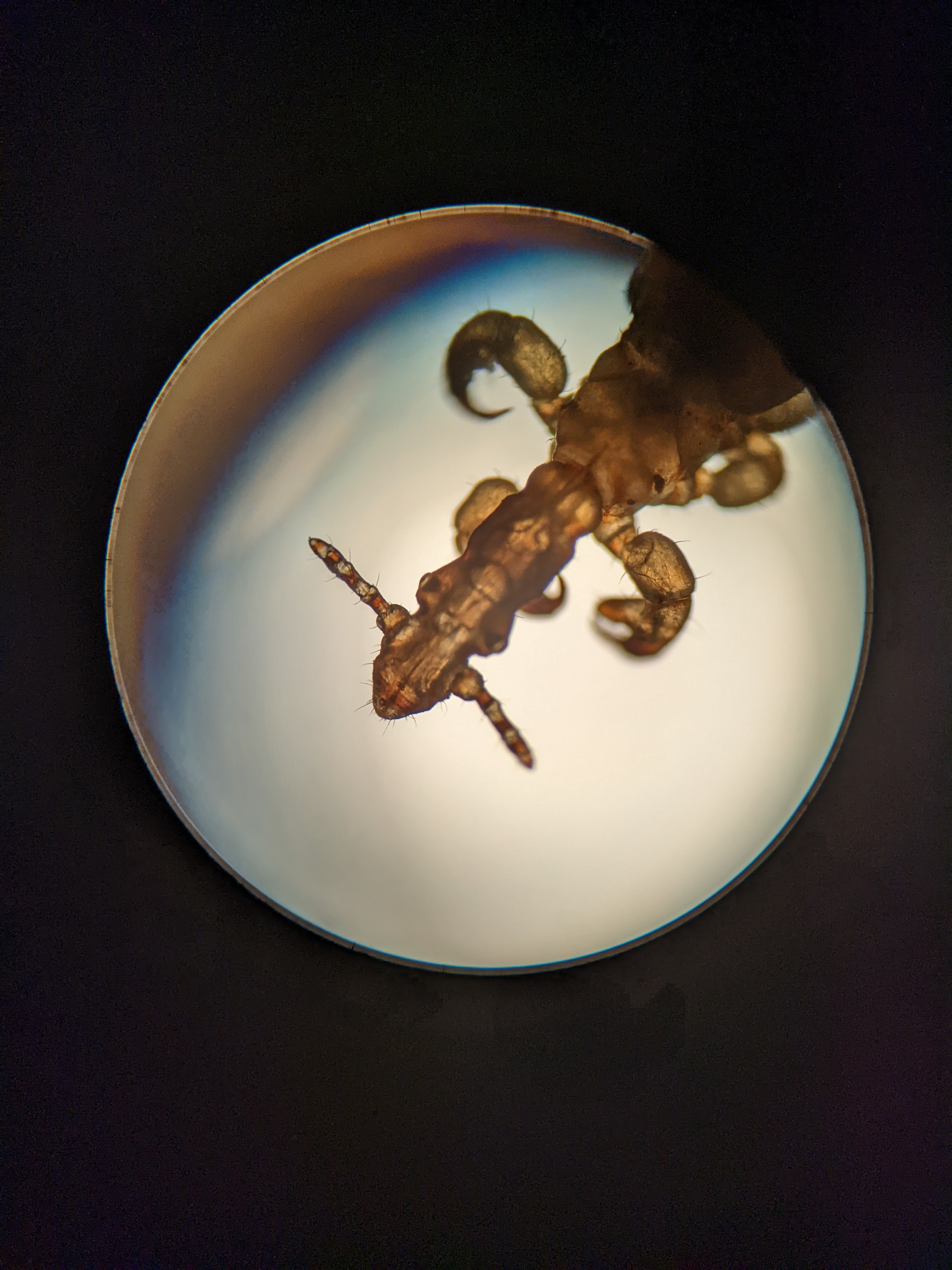
- Pecaroecus javalii head structure

Scientific classification
- Kingdom: Animalia
- Phylum: Arthropoda
- Clade: Pancrustacea
- Class: Insecta
- Order: Psocodea
- Suborder: Troctomorpha
- Infraorder: Phthiraptera
- Parvorder: Anoplura
- Family: Pecaroecidae; Kéler, 1963
- Genus: Pecaroecus; Babcock & Ewing, 1938
- Species: P. javalii

Binomial name
- Pecaroecus javalii Babcock & Ewing, 1938

= Pecaroecus =

Species of louse

Pecaroecus javalii, the giant sucking louse or peccary louse, is a species of sucking louse. It is the only species in the genus Pecaroecus and family Pecaroecidae. This species was first discovered in 1932 by Babcock and Ewing on a one-month-old javelina in west Texas.

== Systematics ==
=== Taxonomy ===
Pecaroecus javalii belongs to the suborder Anoplura and the family Pecaroecidae. Pecaroecus was initially placed in the Haematopinidae family according to the “Ferris” system in 1952 but was later reclassified to the Pecaroecidae family by Kim and Ludwin in 1978 due to differences in many characteristics, including the structure of genitalia. The closest related species is Microthoracius fahrenholz, which is from the Microthoraciidae family, which also infects artiodactyls as well as camelids.

=== Evolution ===
Pecaroecus javalii may have important implications for the understanding of the evolution of sucking lice. The Pecaroecus genus is one of the most basic and generalized genera that parasitize Ferungulata. Some researchers have suggested that Pecaroecus javalii may be very similar to the ancestral form of many sucking lice. Evidence suggests that both Haematopinus and Pecaroecus arose from a common ancestor. Pecaroecus javalii have very basic, primitive features such as eyes and male genitalia that are not fused. Interestingly, it appears Pecaroecus javalii evolved to be able to grasp the coarse hair of Tayassuidae.

== Prevalence ==
Little research has been conducted on the prevalence of Pecaroecus javalii in the environment. However, the few studies that have been done reported a very high prevalence in the populations studied, between 86 and 88% prevalence. Interestingly, male javelina seemed to host significantly more lice than the females studied.

== Anatomy ==
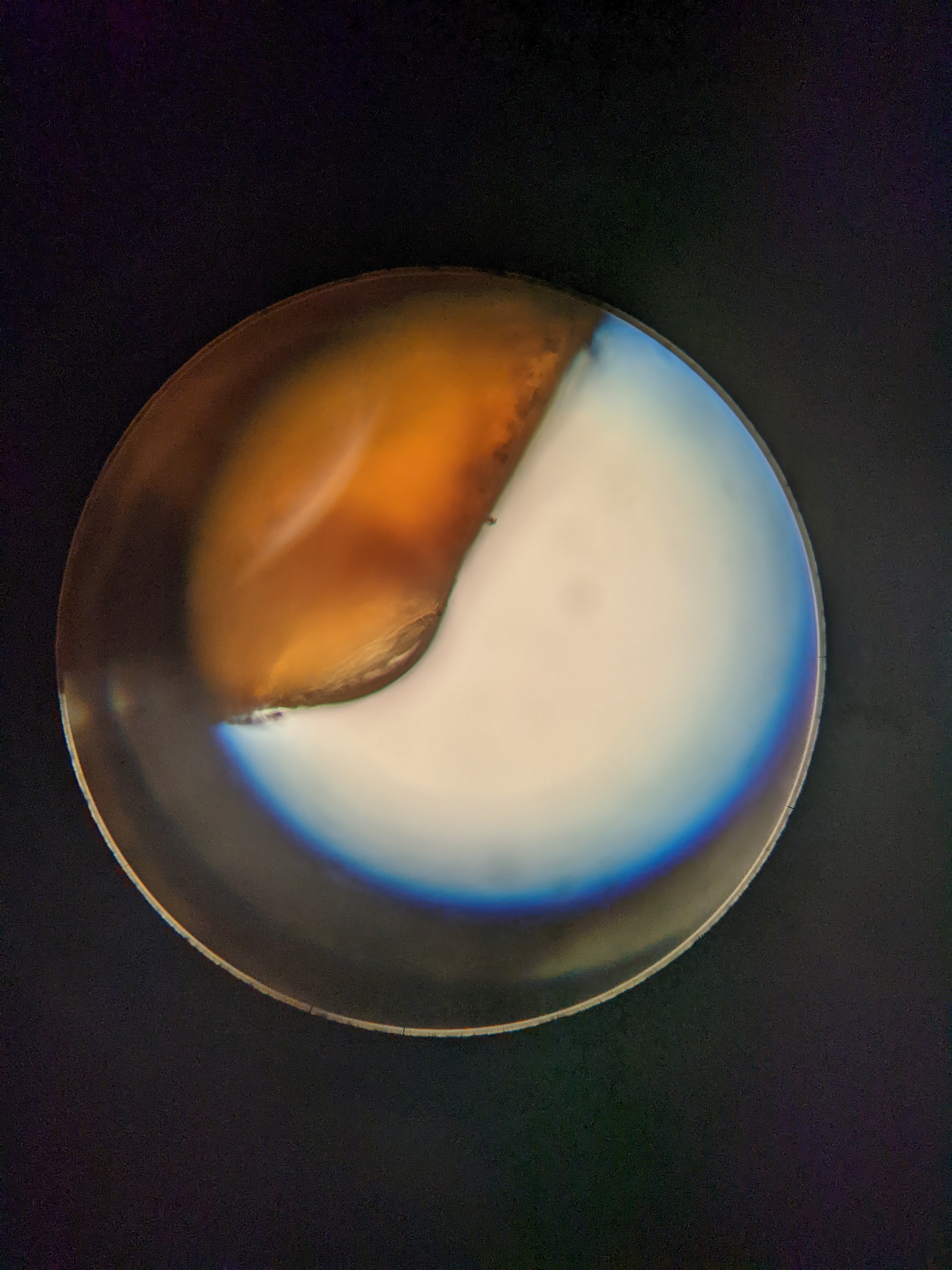
Pecaroecus javalii ocular lens

=== Head ===
The head is characteristically slender, long, and generally the posterior portion is wider than the anterior portion. The antennas are composed of 5 segments. Segment 1 (the proximal-most segment) is much broader than the others. Segment 5 (the distal-most segment) is reduced and smaller than the rest of the antennae segments. The antennae are roughly four times the length of the clypeus plate They have ocular lenses with developed corneas that are prominent on the sides of the head.

=== Thorax ===
The thorax is relatively small, however, it is longer than it is wide. Pecaroecus javalii lack a sternal plate on their thorax, instead, they possess a notal pit as well as a pair of apophyseal pits. They possess spiracles on the dorsal aspect of their thorax.

=== Abdomen ===
The abdomen is composed of 8 segments, each of which has a single row of dorsal setae. Overall, the abdomen is slender and long, similar to the head, and is bilaterally lobed. Spiracles are present on segments 3 and 8. The body has 6 tuberculiform paratergites.

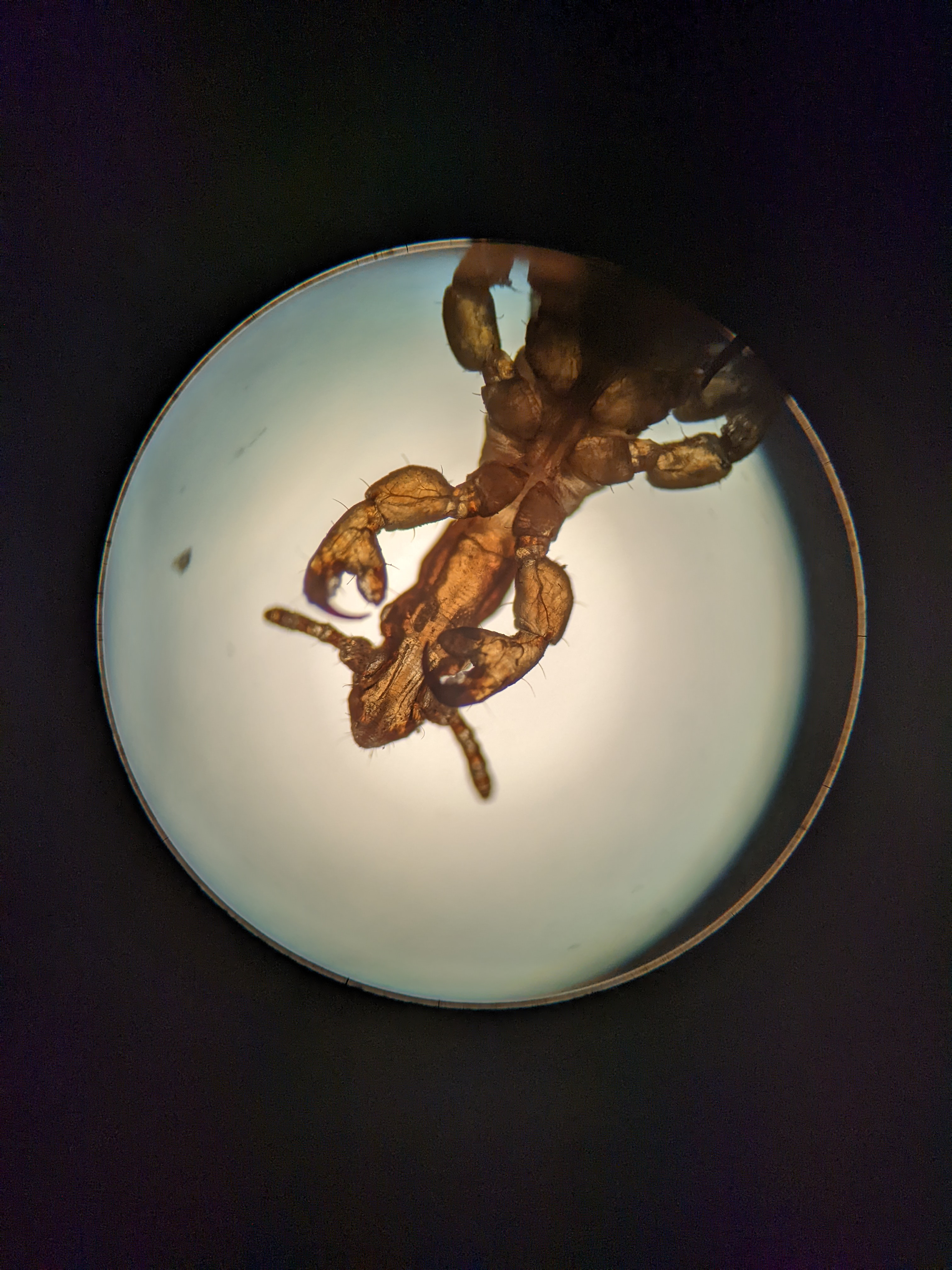
Pecaroecus javalii tibial thumbs

=== Legs ===
The legs of Pecaroecus javalii are long and semicircular. Leg I has a large characteristic tibial thumb that is used to grasp the hair of the host. Legs II and III possess large, toothed claws.

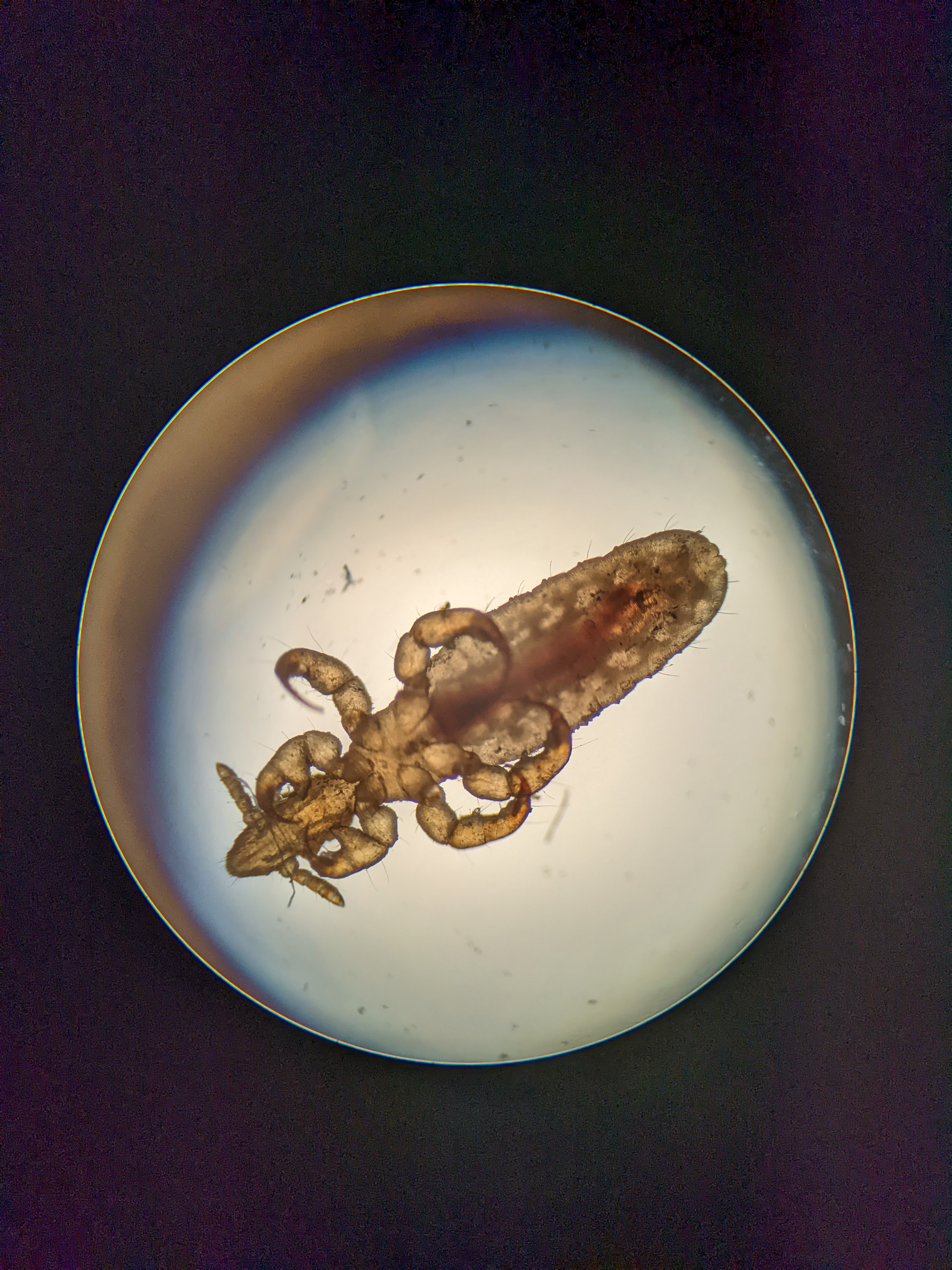
Pecaroecus javalii nymph

=== Nymph ===
The nymph appears like a miniature version of the adult louse and develops and molts on the host. Small spines have been observed in a specific region at the proximal end of the abdomen.

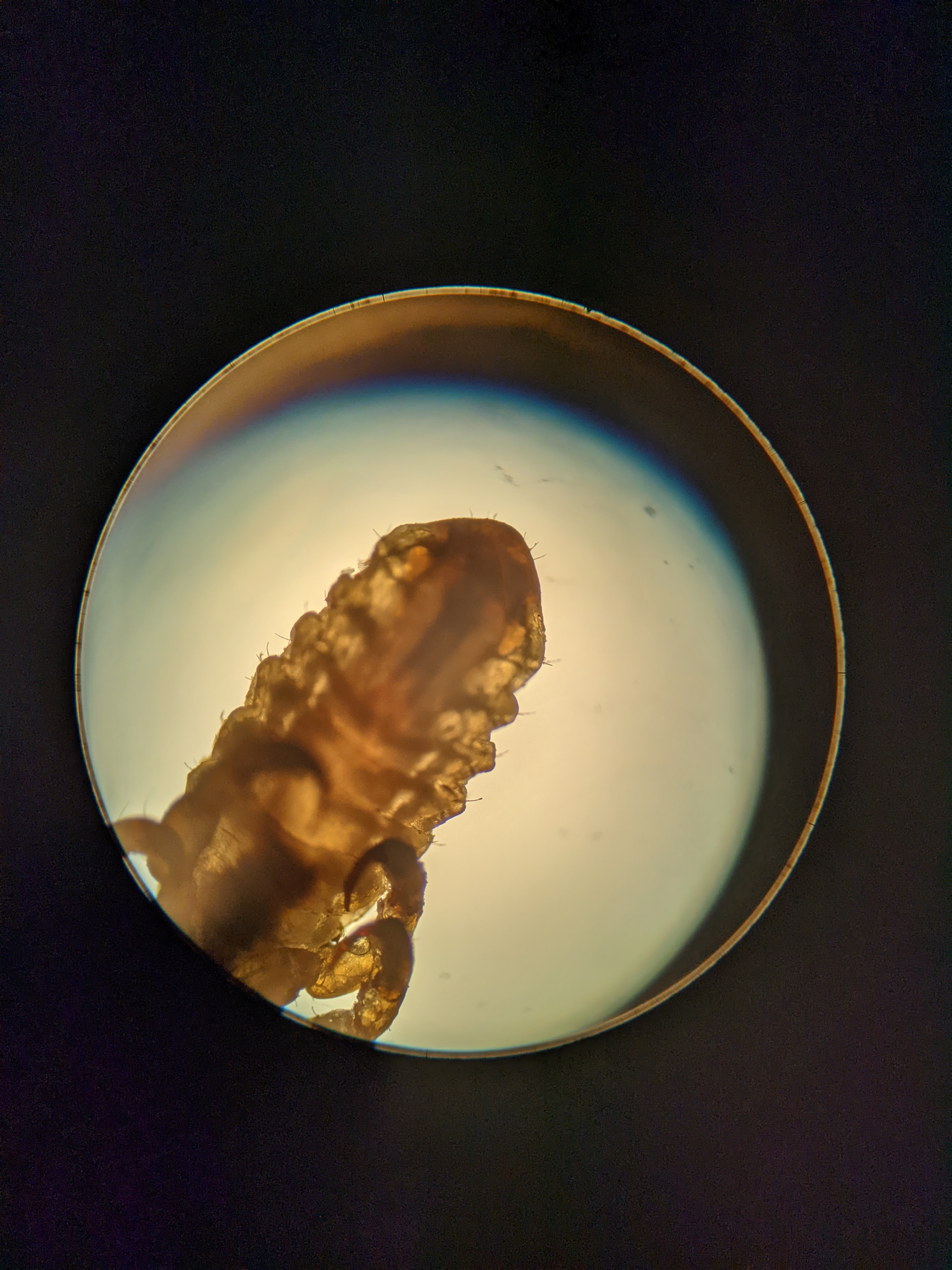
Pecaroecus javalii male anatomy

=== Adult male ===
The male louse has a reported average length of 6.3mm and width of 1.4mm. The male is distinct from the female by possessing parameres that are laterally enlarged, an undeveloped sub genital plate, and a v-shaped pseudo-penis.

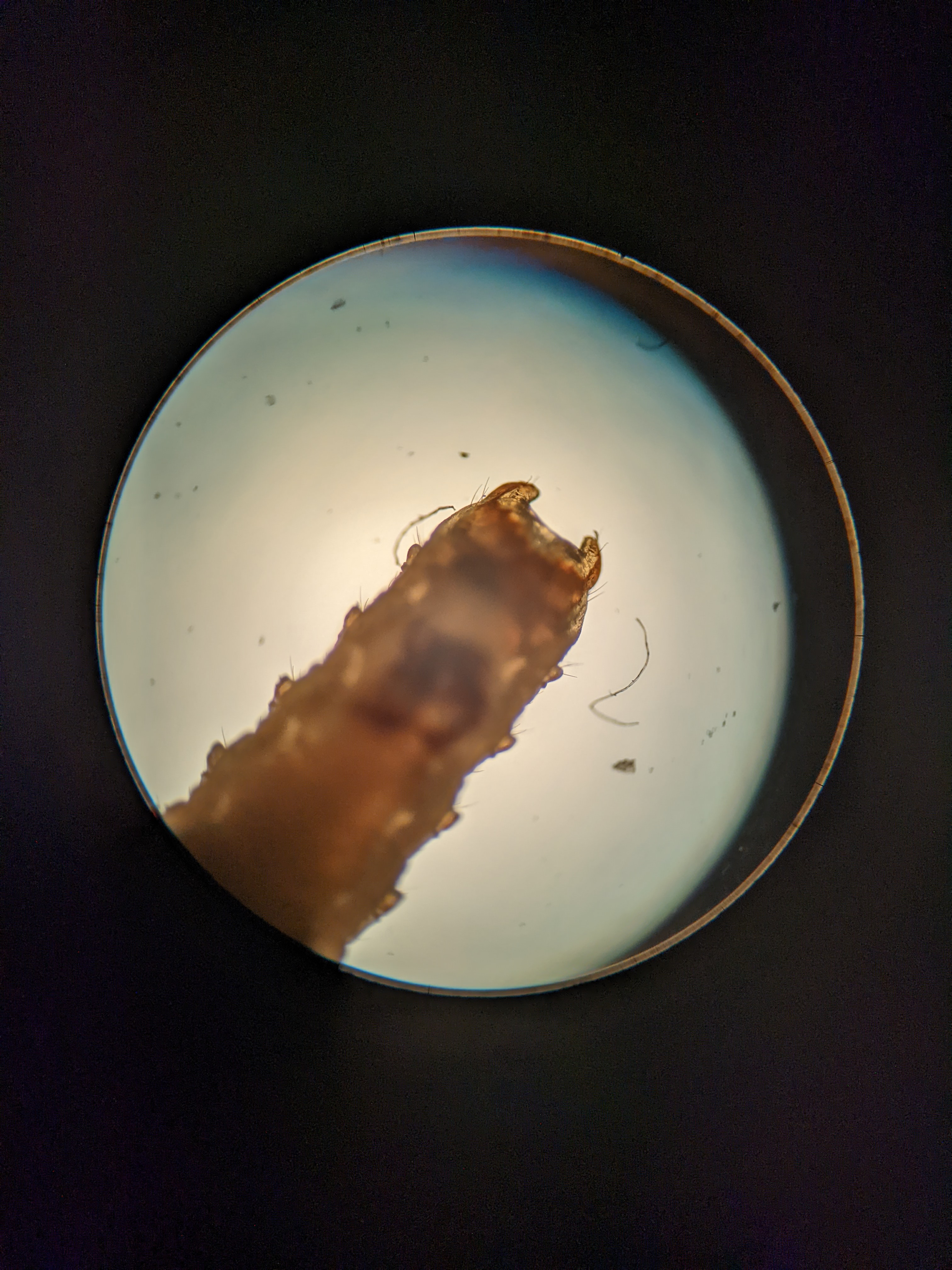
Pecaroecus javalii female anatomy

=== Adult female ===
The female louse has a reported average length of 6.9mm and width of 1.45mm. The female is distinct from the male by possessing a developed trapezoid sub genital plate and pronounced bi-lobed 8th body segment.

== Epidemiology ==
The epidemiology of Pecaroecus javalii is not well known. Most specimens have been collected from the shoulders, eyes, and forequarters of javalina. It is believed the lice concentrate in these areas due to the javalina hair being thicker in these areas. The lice are spread between individuals through direct contact with an infected individual or contact with shared bedding. Direct contact also occurring during birth and lactation, so transmission from a mother to her young is possible.

== Geographical distribution ==
Pecaroecus javalii have been identified on collared peccaries in multiple places in the southeastern United States. These locations include the Davis Mountains (Texas), Trans-Pecos region (Texas), Catron county (New Mexico), Grant county (New Mexico), Luna county (New Mexico), Hidalgo county (New Mexico), and Pima county (Arizona).
