= Hoplopleura hirsuta =

Scientific classification
- Domain: Eukaryota
- Kingdom: Animalia
- Phylum: Arthropoda
- Class: Insecta
- Order: Psocodea
- Family: Hoplopleuridae
- Genus: Hoplopleura
- Species: H. hirsuta

Binomial name
- Hoplopleura hirsuta Ferris, 1916

Species of louse

Hoplopleura hirsuta is a sucking louse that is known from North, Central, and South America. Its main hosts are cotton rats such as Sigmodon hispidus, Sigmodon ochrognathus, Sigmodon peruanus, and Sigmodon arizonae.

== Literature cited ==
- Durden, L.A. and Musser, G.G. 1994. The sucking lice (Insecta, Anoplura) of the world: a taxonomic checklist with records of mammalian hosts and geographical distributions. Bulletin of the American Museum of Natural History 218:1–90.
