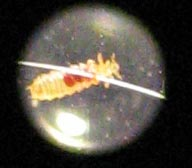

Scientific classification
- Kingdom: Animalia
- Phylum: Arthropoda
- Class: Insecta
- Order: Psocodea
- Infraorder: Phthiraptera
- Family: Polyplacidae
- Genus: Polyplax
- Species: P. spinulosa

Binomial name
- Polyplax spinulosa (Burmeister, 1839)

Synonyms
- Pediculus spinulosus Burmeister, 1839; Haematopinus spinulosus: Denny, 1842; Pediculus denticulatus Nitzsch, 1864; Haematopinus (Polyplax) spinulosus: Neumann, 1909; Polyplax campylopteri Zavaleta, 1945

= Polyplax spinulosa =

Species of louse

Polyplax spinulosa is a sucking louse (Anoplura) from the genus Polyplax. It occurs worldwide and commonly infects its type host, the brown rat (Rattus norvegicus), and related species like the black rat (Rattus rattus), Rattus pyctoris, Rattus nitidus, Rattus argentiventer, Rattus tanezumi, Rattus exulans, and Bandicota indica. It is also occasionally found in other rodents, such as the marsh rice rat (Oryzomys palustris) in North America.

== Literature cited ==
- Durden, L.A. 1988. The spiny rat louse, Polyplax spinulosa, as a parasite of the rice rat, Oryzomys palustris, in North America (subscription required). The Journal of Parasitology 74(5):900–901.
- Durden, L.A. and Musser, G.G. 1994. The sucking lice (Insecta, Anoplura) of the world: a taxonomic checklist with records of mammalian hosts and geographical distributions. Bulletin of the American Museum of Natural History 218:1–90.
