= Haematopinus oliveri =

Conservation status
- Critically Endangered (IUCN 3.1)

Scientific classification
- Kingdom: Animalia
- Phylum: Arthropoda
- Class: Insecta
- Order: Psocodea
- Infraorder: Phthiraptera
- Family: Haematopinidae
- Genus: Haematopinus
- Species: H. oliveri

Binomial name
- Haematopinus oliveri Mishra & Singh, 1978

Species of louse

Haematopinus oliveri, known commonly as the pygmy hog-sucking louse, is a critically endangered species of insect in the suborder Anoplura, the sucking lice. It is an ectoparasite found only on another critically endangered species, the pygmy hog (Porcula salvania). It is endemic to India and can now only be found in parts of north-western Assam.
