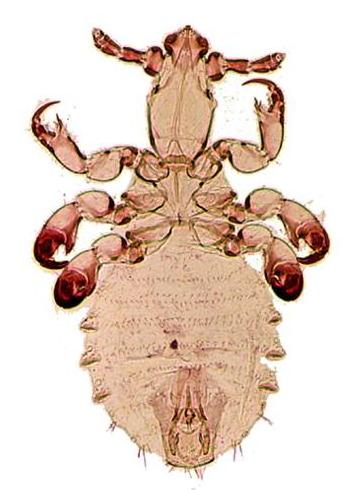
- Pedicinus hamadryas as seen under a light microscope

Scientific classification
- Domain: Eukaryota
- Kingdom: Animalia
- Phylum: Arthropoda
- Class: Insecta
- Order: Psocodea
- Family: Pedicinidae
- Genus: Pedicinus
- Species: P. hamadryas

Binomial name
- Pedicinus hamadryas Mjöberg, 1910

= Pedicinus hamadryas =

Species of louse

Pedicinus hamadryas is a species of sucking louse. Its typical host is the baboon .
