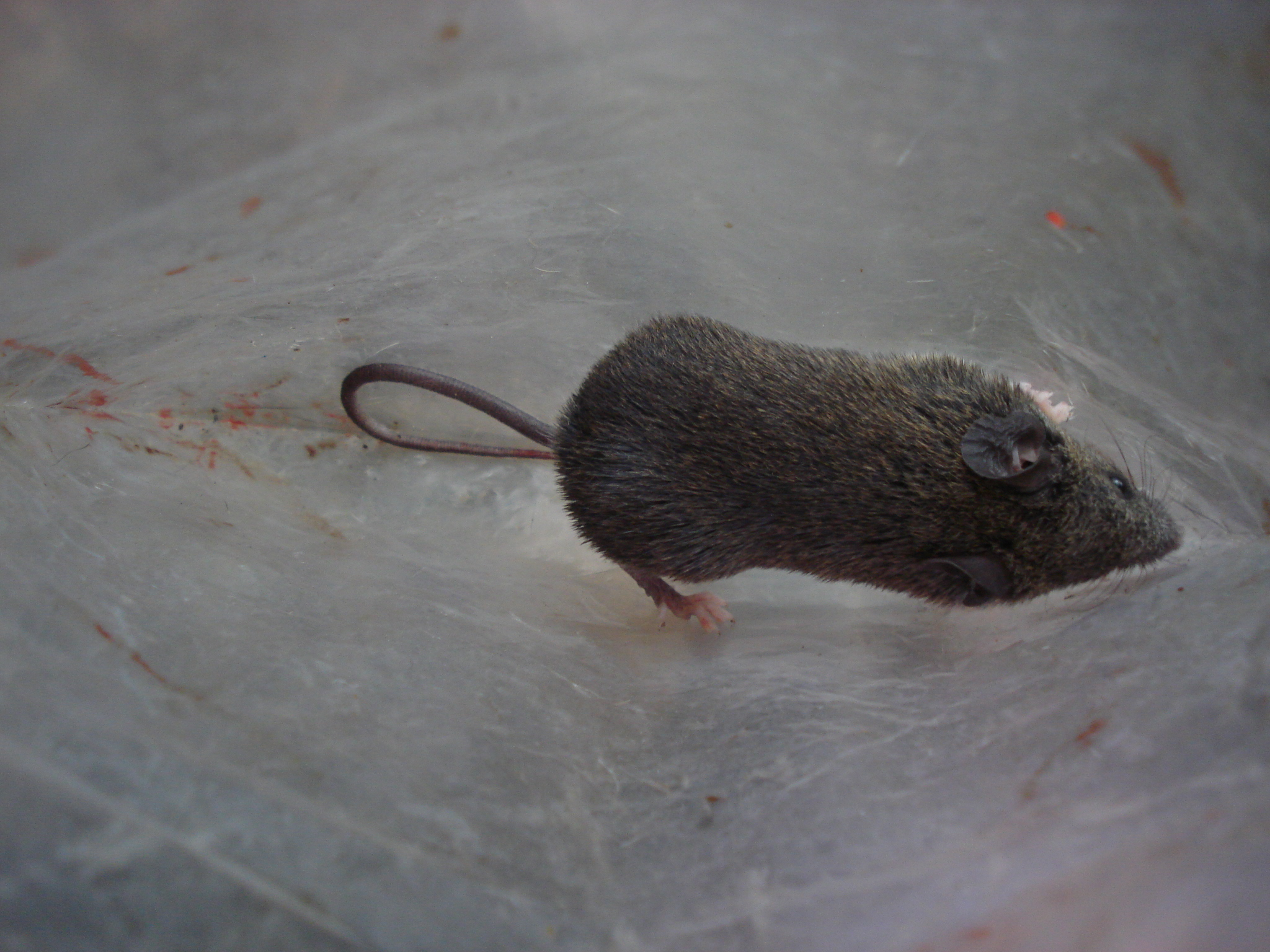
- Gairdner's shrewmouse (Mus pahari)

Scientific classification
- Kingdom: Animalia
- Phylum: Chordata
- Class: Mammalia
- Order: Rodentia
- Family: Muridae
- Genus: Mus
- Subgenus: Coelomys; Thomas, 1915

Type species
- Coelomys mayori Thomas, 1915

Species
- 4, see text

= Mus (Coelomys) =

Subgenus of rodents

The shrewmouse or shrew-like mouse (Coelomys) is a subgenus of the rodent genus Mus, the mice. This subgenus is native to Southeast Asia.

Species:

- Mus crociduroides – Sumatran shrewlike mouse (Western Sumatra)
- Mus mayori – Mayor's mouse (Sri Lanka)
- Mus pahari – Gairdner's shrewmouse, Indochinese shrewlike mouse, Sikkim mouse (Northeastern India to southwestern Cambodia and northern Vietnam)
- Mus vulcani – volcano mouse, Javan shrewlike mouse (Western Java)
