= Hybophthirus =

Scientific classification
- Kingdom: Animalia
- Phylum: Arthropoda
- Clade: Pancrustacea
- Class: Insecta
- Order: Psocodea
- Suborder: Troctomorpha
- Infraorder: Phthiraptera
- Parvorder: Anoplura
- Family: Hybophthiridae; Ewing, 1929
- Genus: Hybophthirus; Enderlein, 1909
- Species: H. notophallus

Binomial name
- Hybophthirus notophallus (Neumann, 1909)

Synonyms
- Haematopinus notophallus; Hybophthirus orycteropodi

Species of insect

Hybophthirus notophallus is a member of the superfamily Anoplura, meaning it is an ectoparasite that feeds on the blood of its mammalian host. It is a highly specialized louse that parasitizes Orycteropus afer, commonly known as the aardvark. This louse is the only species within the genus Hybophthirus and the family Hybophthiridae.

A notable characteristic of Hybophthirus notophallus is the bearing of a structure resembling a claw in addition to the true claw. Because this species is so specialized, it is believed that it has coevolved with its host over a significant period of time.

The species was first discovered in the Gochas village of Namibia. However, it can be found in various other African countries, including South Africa, Tanzania, and Kenya. The species was first described by Gustav Enderlein in 1909.

== Bibliography ==
- Durden i Musser ii, L.A. i G.G. ii (January 19, 1994). The Sucking Lice of the World (PDF). American Museum of Natural History. p. 38.
- Kim i Ludwig ii, K.C. i H.W. ii (1978). "The family classification of Anoplura" (PDF). Systematic Entomology. 3 (3): 265. Bibcode:1978SysEn...3..249K. doi:10.1111/j.1365-3113.1978.tb00120.x.
