= Volcano mouse =

Conservation status
- Least Concern (IUCN 3.1)

Scientific classification
- Kingdom: Animalia
- Phylum: Chordata
- Class: Mammalia
- Order: Rodentia
- Family: Muridae
- Genus: Mus
- Subgenus: Coelomys
- Species: M. vulcani

Binomial name
- Mus vulcani (Robinson & Kloss, 1919)

Species of rodent

The volcano mouse or Javan shrew-like mouse (Mus vulcani) is a species of rodent in the family Muridae endemic to Indonesia.
