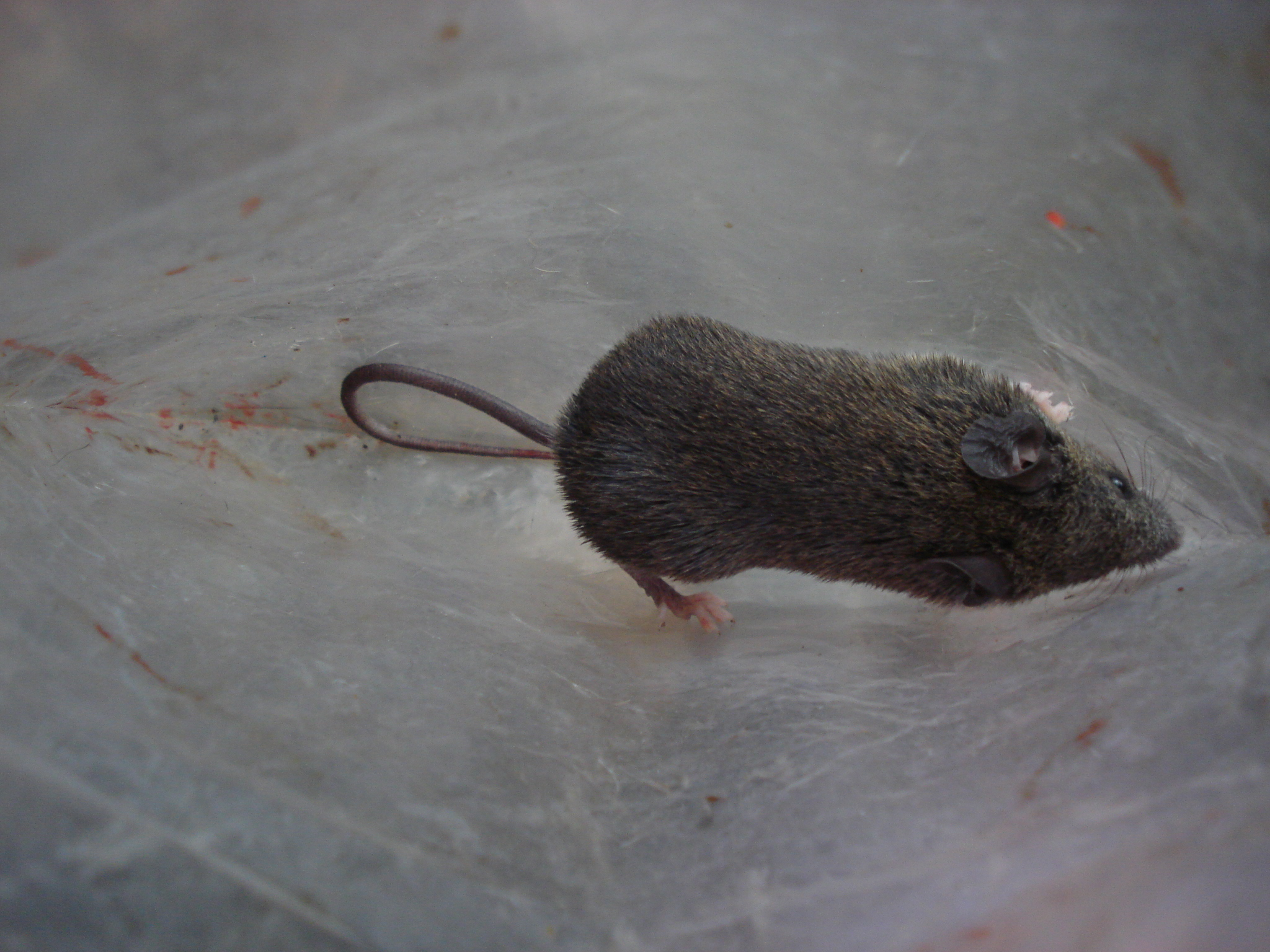

Conservation status
- Least Concern (IUCN 3.1)

Scientific classification
- Kingdom: Animalia
- Phylum: Chordata
- Class: Mammalia
- Order: Rodentia
- Family: Muridae
- Genus: Mus
- Subgenus: Coelomys
- Species: M. pahari

Binomial name
- Mus pahari Thomas, 1916
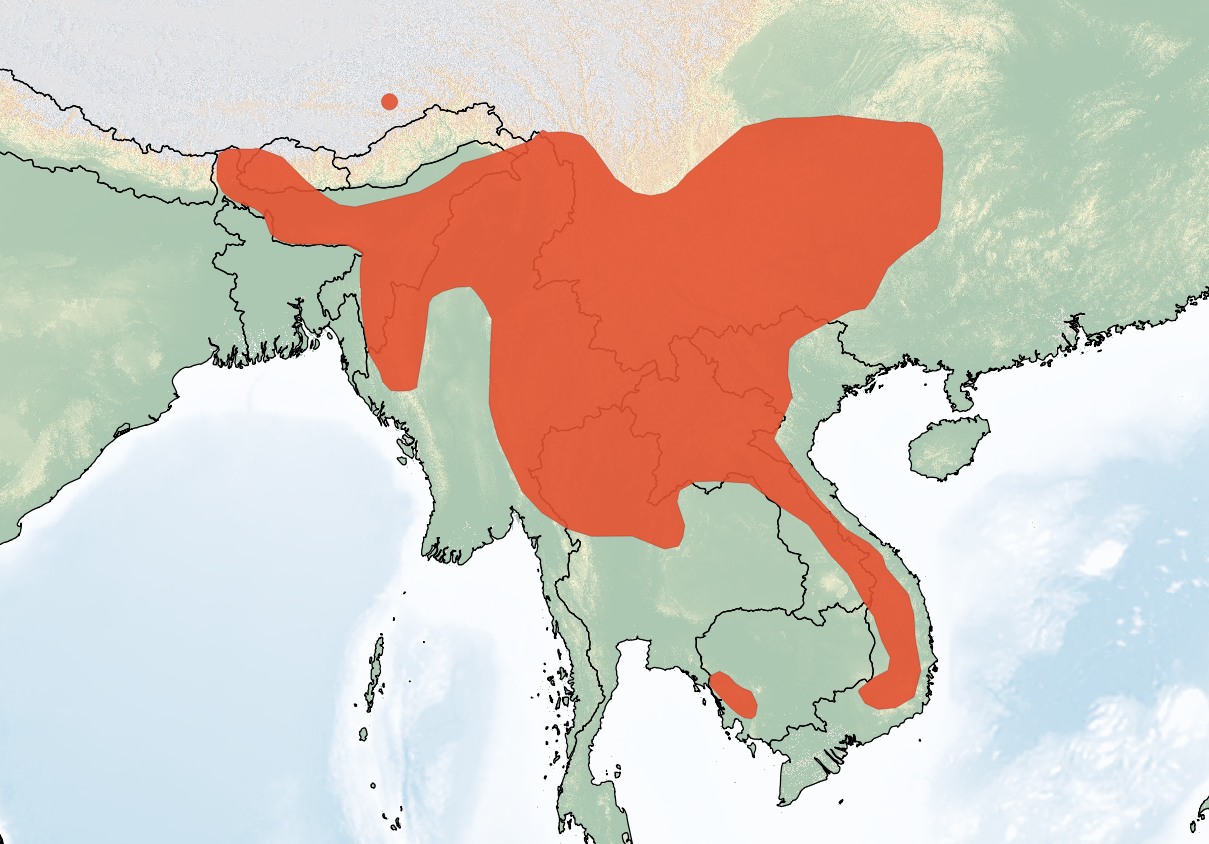

= Gairdner's shrewmouse =

Species of rodent

Gairdner's shrewmouse (Mus pahari) is a species of rodent in the family Muridae found in China, India, Laos, Myanmar, Thailand, and Vietnam.
