= Ratemiidae =

Scientific classification
- Kingdom: Animalia
- Phylum: Arthropoda
- Clade: Pancrustacea
- Class: Insecta
- Order: Psocodea
- Suborder: Troctomorpha
- Infraorder: Phthiraptera
- Parvorder: Anoplura
- Family: Ratemiidae; Kim & Ludwig, 1978

Family of insects

Ratemiidae is a family of lice within Anoplura (sucking lice) that is a parasite of Perissodactyla (horses and other odd toed ungulates). Ratemiidae is capable of transferring diseases such as typhus to their hosts. These lice are found primarily in China.

== Ecology and evolution ==
Ratemiidae are a family of lice (Psocodea) within the super-family Anoplura, which entails the sucking lice. These lice have one genus (Ratemia) that consist of two species both of which are obligate parasites of horses.

== Distribution ==
Ratemiidae is endemic to the Xinjiang province of China.

== Diseases transmission ==
Ratemiidae are capable of transferring the bacteria that causes typhus to their host. This is done when a louse pierces the skin of its host and begins to suction out blood, in the process the louse's saliva is injected, along with the bacteria, into the host.
