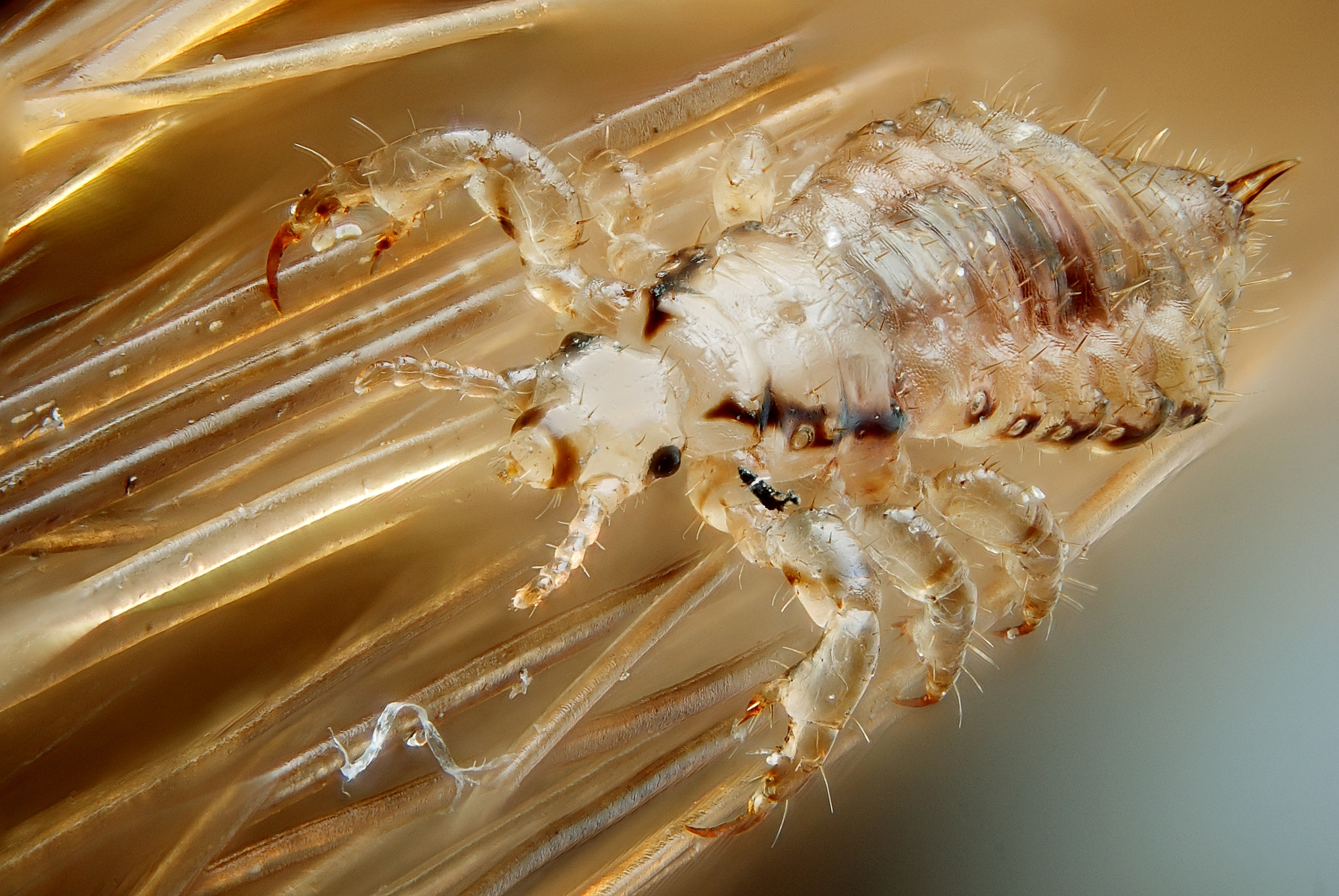
- Head louse, Pediculus humanus capitis

Scientific classification
- Kingdom: Animalia
- Phylum: Arthropoda
- Clade: Pancrustacea
- Class: Insecta
- Order: Psocodea
- Suborder: Troctomorpha
- Infraorder: Phthiraptera
- Parvorder: Anoplura
- Family: Pediculidae; Leach, 1817
- Genus: Pediculus; Linnaeus, 1758

Species
- See text

= Pediculus =

Genus of lice

Pediculus is a genus of sucking lice, the sole genus in the family Pediculidae. Pediculus species are ectoparasites of primates.

Species include:

- Pediculus clavicornis Nitzsch, 1864
- Pediculus humanus Linnaeus, 1758
  - Pediculus humanus humanus Linnaeus, 1758 – the body louse
  - Pediculus humanus capitis De Geer, 1767 – the head louse
- Pediculus mjobergi Ferris, 1916
- Pediculus schaeffi Fahrenholz, 1910

Humans are the hosts of Pediculus humanus. Chimpanzees and bonobos host Pediculus shaeffi. Various New World monkeys in the families Cebidae and Atelidae host Pediculus mjobergi.

The three-gene cladogram (largely reproduced in a later phylogenomic analysis, which included fewer taxa of this genus) is:

- 47.6
  - Polyplax serrata
  - 27.4
    - 16.2
      - 5.9
        - 0.8
          - Pediculus humanus capitis
          - Pediculus humanus humanus
        - Pediculus schaeffi
      - 2.9
        - Pthirus pubis
        - Pthirus gorillae
    - 17.2
      - Pedicinus hamadryas
      - 4.3
        - Pedicinus badii
        - Pedicinus pictus

Labels below nodes are estimated divergence times (Mya).
