= Sumatran shrewlike mouse =

Conservation status
- Data Deficient (IUCN 3.1)

Scientific classification
- Kingdom: Animalia
- Phylum: Chordata
- Class: Mammalia
- Order: Rodentia
- Family: Muridae
- Genus: Mus
- Subgenus: Coelomys
- Species: M. crociduroides

Binomial name
- Mus crociduroides (Robinson & Kloss, 1916)

Species of rodent

The Sumatran shrew-like mouse (Mus crociduroides) is a species of mouse. It is endemic to Indonesia.

This mouse is known only from the mountains of western Sumatra, where it lives in rainforest habitat. It occurs in Kerinci Seblat National Park. Currently there no images of the animal online due to there remote location.
