= Linognathus =

Scientific classification
- Kingdom: Animalia
- Phylum: Arthropoda
- Clade: Pancrustacea
- Class: Insecta
- Order: Psocodea
- Infraorder: Phthiraptera
- Family: Linognathidae
- Genus: Linognathus; Enderlein, 1905

Genus of lice

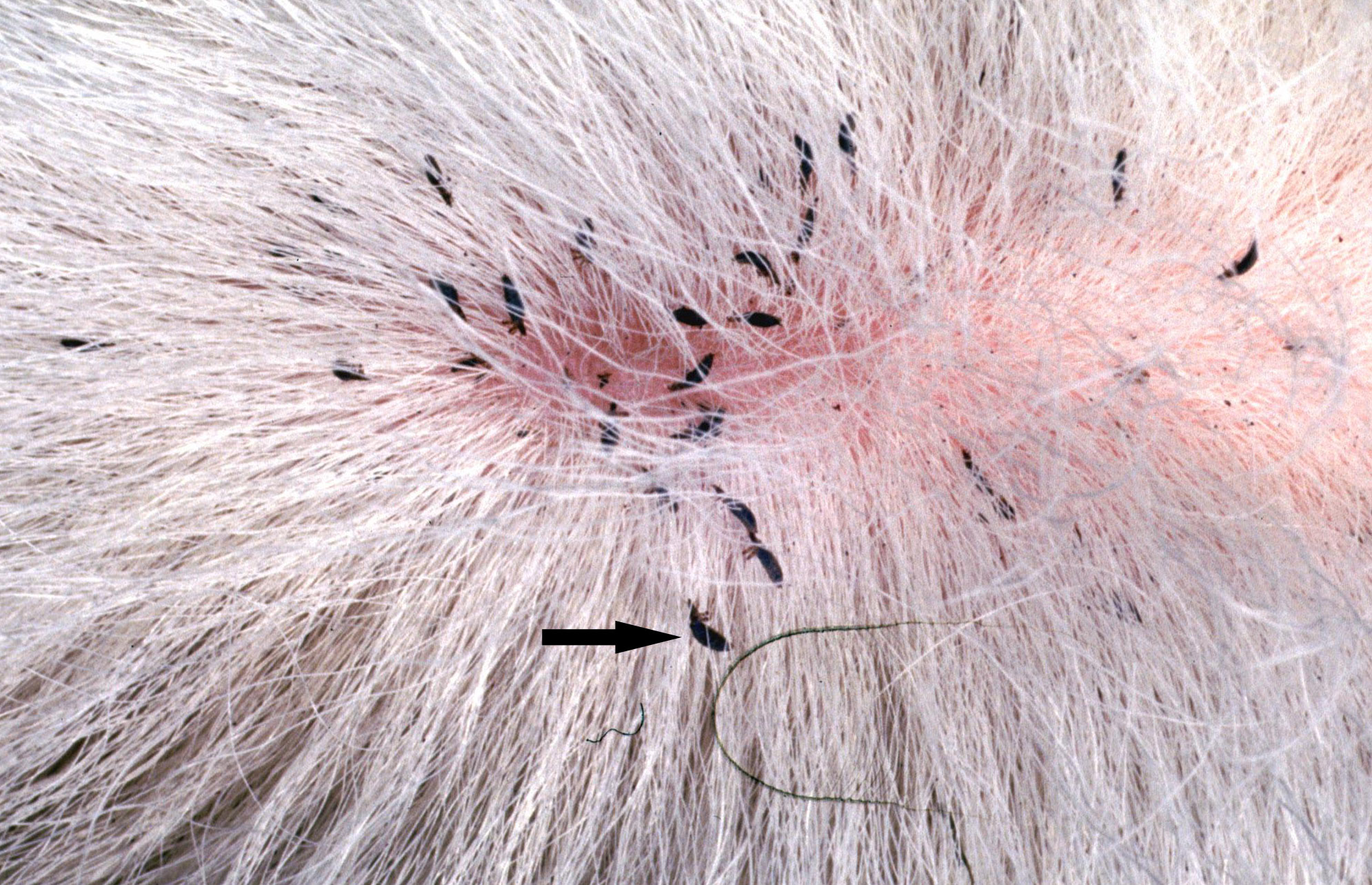
Infestation of a cow with Linognathus lice.

Linognathus is a genus of lice belonging to the family Linognathidae.

The species of this genus are found in Eurasia, Africa and Northern America.

Species:

- Linognathus aepycerus Bedford, 1936
- Linognathus africanus Kellogg & Paine, 1911
