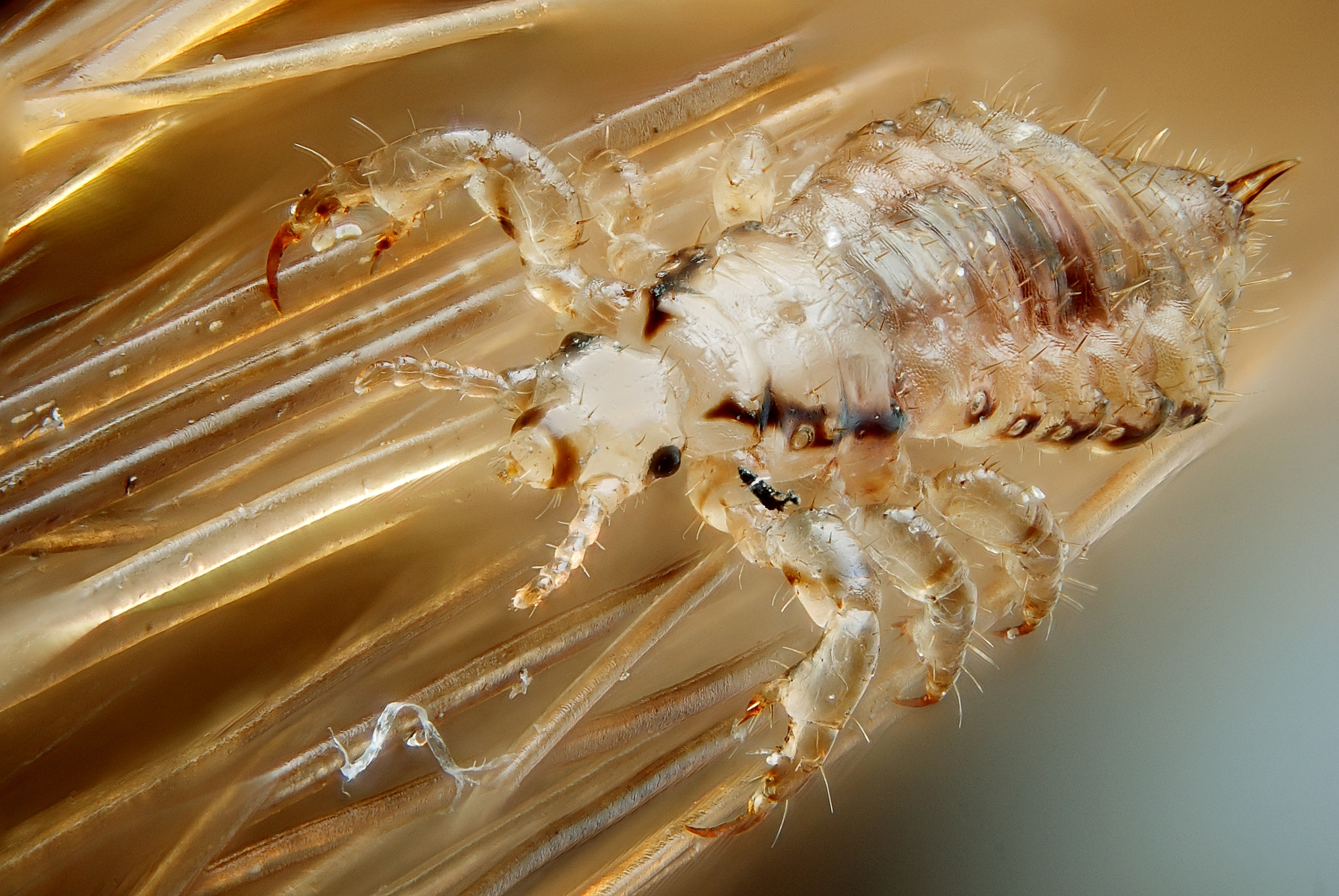
- Head louse, P. humanus capitis

Scientific classification
- Kingdom: Animalia
- Phylum: Arthropoda
- Class: Insecta
- Order: Psocodea
- Infraorder: Phthiraptera
- Family: Pediculidae
- Genus: Pediculus
- Species: P. humanus

Binomial name
- Pediculus humanus Linnaeus, 1758

= Pediculus humanus =

Species of louse

Pediculus humanus is a species of louse that infests humans. It comprises two subspecies:

- Pediculus humanus humanus Linnaeus, 1758 – body louse
- Pediculus humanus capitis De Geer, 1767 – head louse
