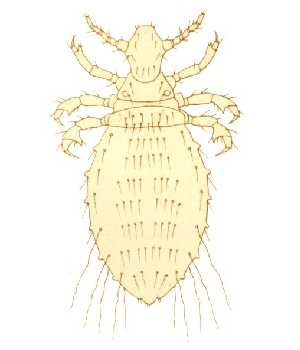
- Solenopotes

Scientific classification
- Domain: Eukaryota
- Kingdom: Animalia
- Phylum: Arthropoda
- Class: Insecta
- Order: Psocodea
- Family: Linognathidae
- Genus: Solenopotes; Enderlein, 1904

= Solenopotes =

Genus of lice

Solenopotes is a genus of lice belonging to the family Linognathidae.

The species of this genus are found in Europe and Northern America.

Species:

- Solenopotes binipilosus (Fahrenholz, 1916)
- Solenopotes burmeisteri (Fahrenholz, 1919)
- Solenopotes capillatus Enderlein, 1904
- Solenopotes capreoli Freund, 1935
- Solenopotes ferrisi (Fahrenholz, 1919)
- Solenopotes hologastrus (Werneck, 1937)
- Solenopotes muntiacus G.B.Thompson, 1938
- Solenopotes natalensis Ledger, 1970
- Solenopotes tarandi (Mjoberg, 1915)
