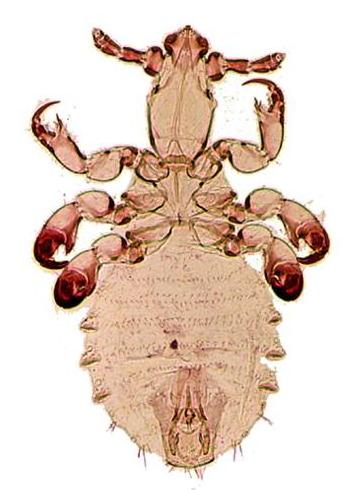
- Pedicinus hamadryas as seen under a light microscope

Scientific classification
- Kingdom: Animalia
- Phylum: Arthropoda
- Clade: Pancrustacea
- Class: Insecta
- Order: Psocodea
- Suborder: Troctomorpha
- Infraorder: Phthiraptera
- Parvorder: Anoplura
- Family: Pedicinidae; Enderlein, 1904
- Genus: Pedicinus; Gervais, 1844

Species
- See text

= Pedicinus =

Genus of lice

Pedicinus is a genus of sucking louse, the only genus in the family Pedicinidae. Species belonging to this genus are found on Old World monkeys and apes of different kinds. Pedicinus, along with its sister genus Pthirus, are believed to have diverged from their common ancestor approximately 22.5-2.5 million years ago.

Pedicinus has been studied on a genetic level by researchers looking for insight into the evolutionary history of their primate hosts.

== Species ==
- Pedicinus albidus - Rudow, 1869
- Pedicinus ancoratus - Ferris, 1934
- Pedicinus badii - Kuhn and Ludwig, 1964
- Pedicinus cercocebi - Kuhn and Ludwig, 1967
- Pedicinus colobi - Fahrenholz, 1917
- Pedicinus cynopitheci - Kuhn and Ludwig, 1967
- Pedicinus eurygaster - Burmeister, 1838
- Pedicinus ferrisi - Kuhn and Ludwig, 1965
- Pedicinus hamadryas - Mjöberg, 1910
- Pedicinus miopitheci - Kuhn and Ludwig, 1970
- Pedicinus obtusus - Rudow, 1869
- Pedicinus patas - Fahrenholz, 1916
- Pedicinus pictus - Ferris, 1934
- Pedicinus veri - Kuhn and Ludwig, 1963

Species data retrieved from Integrated Taxonomic Information System.

== Phylogeny ==
A three-gene phylogeny (largely reproduced in a later phylogenomic analysis, which included fewer taxa of this genus) is:

- 47.6
  - Polyplax serrata
  - 27.4
    - 16.2
      - 5.9
        - 0.8
          - Pediculus humanus capitis
          - Pediculus humanus humanus
        - Pediculus schaeffi
      - 2.9
        - Pthirus pubis
        - Pthirus gorillae
    - 17.2
      - Pedicinus hamadryas
      - 4.3
        - Pedicinus badii
        - Pedicinus pictus

Labels below nodes are estimated divergence times (Mya).
