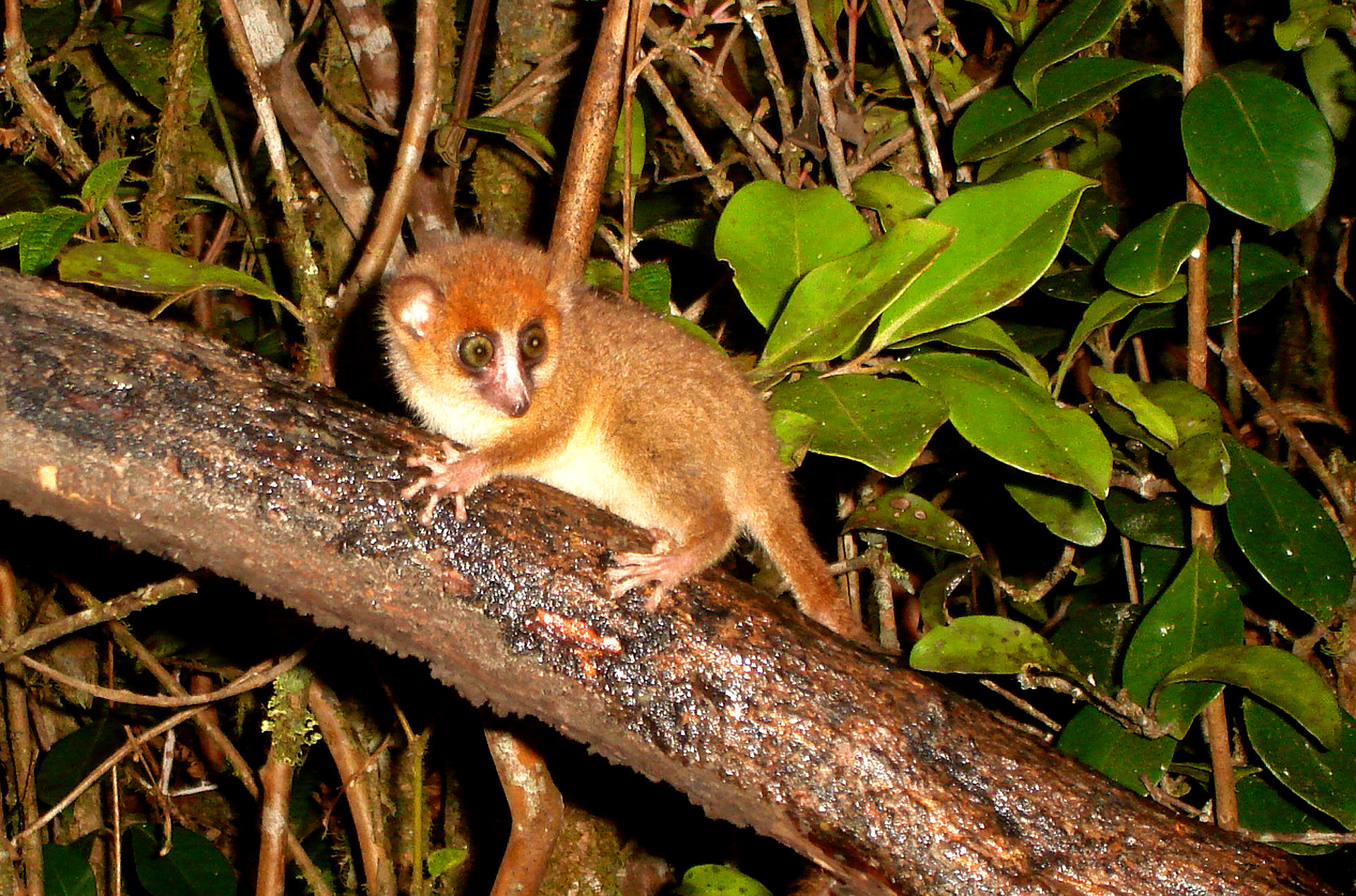

Conservation status
- Vulnerable (IUCN 3.1)
- CITES Appendix I

Scientific classification
- Kingdom: Animalia
- Phylum: Chordata
- Class: Mammalia
- Order: Primates
- Suborder: Strepsirrhini
- Family: Cheirogaleidae
- Genus: Microcebus
- Species: M. rufus

Binomial name
- Microcebus rufus Lesson, 1840
- Distribution of M. rufus

Synonyms
- smithii J.E. Gray, 1842

= Brown mouse lemur =

Species of lemur

The brown mouse lemur (Microcebus rufus) is a small primate, and like the other mouse lemurs can only be found on the island of Madagascar. They are known also as the rufous mouse lemur, eastern rufous mouse lemur, red mouse lemur, or russet mouse lemur. Its dorsal side is brown or reddish-brown, while ventrally it is a whitish-grey.

The mouse lemurs are among the shortest-lived of primates. The brown mouse lemur has a lifespan of 6–8 years in the wild, although it averages 12 years under human care.

It can be found in rainforests in eastern Madagascar. It is a solitary and nocturnal creature.

== Taxonomy ==
Étienne Geoffroy Saint-Hilaire described this species in 1836 when he described the genus Microcebus, and is sometimes incorrectly cited as the author of this species, but he neglected to assign it a specific epithet. René Lesson would later give the animal a proper taxonomic name as Microcebus rufus. Wilson & Reeder's 2005 mammal checklist Mammal Species of the World recognized Geoffroy as the correct taxonomic authority despite the lack of a taxonomic name. The ITIS and American Society of Mammalogists both recognize Lesson as the correct authority.

It was considered a subspecies of the gray mouse lemur (Microcebus murinus) until 1977, when it was recognized as a distinct species.

== Diet ==
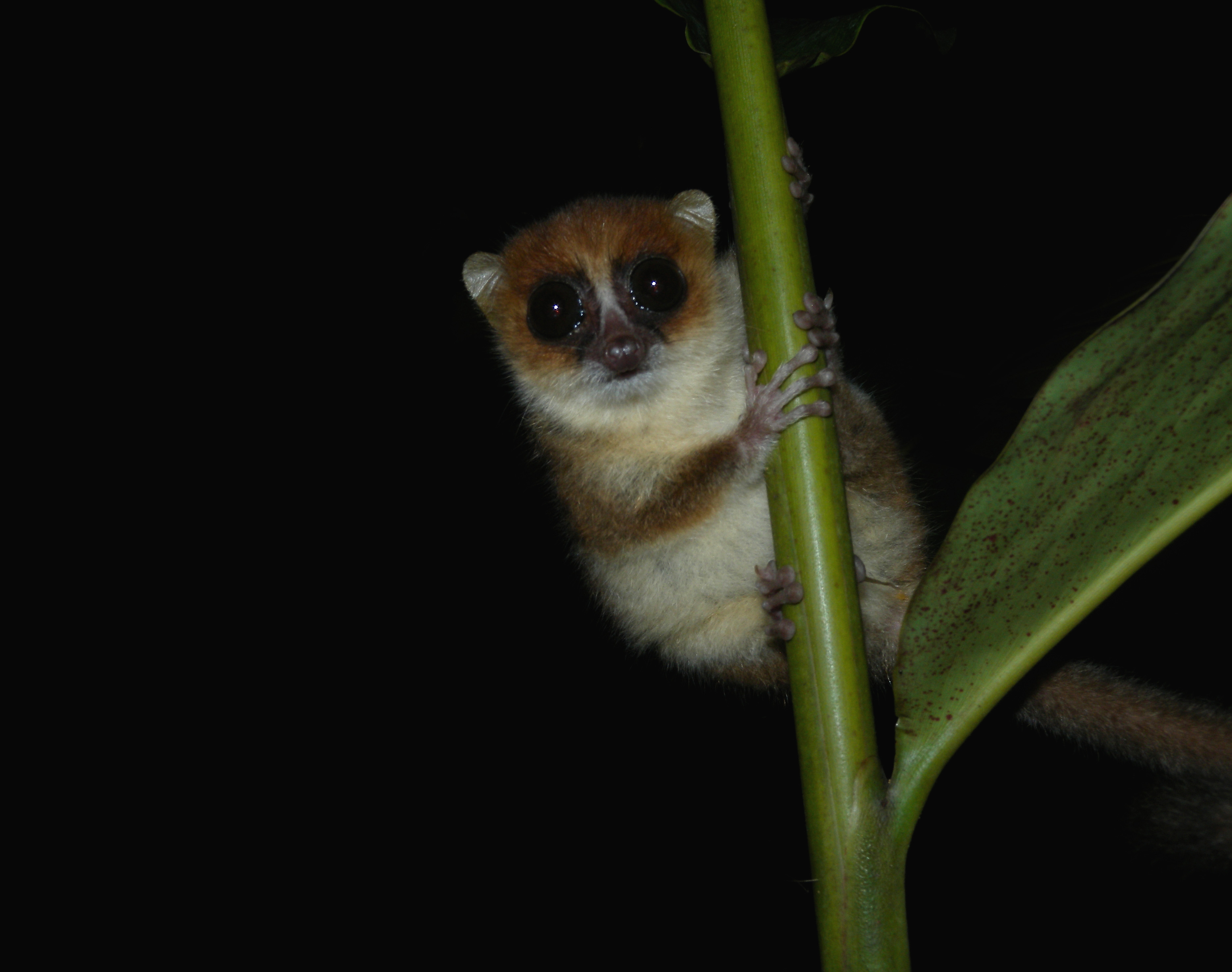
Brown mouse lemur

Brown mouse lemurs are nocturnal creatures, which means they sleep during the day and search for food at night. According to National Geographic, brown mouse lemurs consume "insects, fruit, flowers, and other plants." They are known to be mostly frugivorous primates (primarily fruit eating), but they can be omnivorous as well. The brown mouse lemur is able to store "thirty-five percent of their body weight" in the form of fat. This fat is stored in the lemur's hind legs and tail and is used for energy when food sources are scarce.

== Mating and breeding ==
According to Matthew Esser, "Sexual maturity is reached after one year of age." The brown mouse lemur also has an established mating ritual. A male will use "soft squeak calls and tail-lashing" to signal the female. The female shows that she is willing to mate by "ano-genital rubbing and mouth wiping." When the mating has ended, the female will making a threatening sound. Some of the males who are more dominant will have multiple mates. "Brown mouse lemurs mate between September and October." The offspring are usually born between November and December. There are usually one to three young for each litter; females are capable of having one to two litters each year. In the winter months following their birth, the males of the species leave the areas where they were born.

== Habitat ==
The brown mouse lemur generally makes its home in holes found in trees and nests that are made of leaves. On occasion, brown mouse lemurs make use of bird nests. They tend to create the nests in relatively large groups. These groups are made up of the immature young and the females.

== Threats ==
IUCN red list website states that, "The principal threat to this species is habitat loss due to slash-and-burn agriculture." They are also threatened by natural predators in their habitat. Some of the well-known predators are "fossa (Cryptoprocta ferox), ring tailed mongoose(Galidia elegans), owls (Strigiformes), and Madagascar harrier hawk (Polyboroides radiatus)." Some say that brown mouse lemurs could be influential in spreading the seeds of plants and fruits they eat. As a result of deforestation they are at risk of extinction according to the Convention on International Trade in Endangered Species (CITES).

== See also ==
- Lemurpediculus verruculosus
