= Enderleinellidae =

Scientific classification
- Kingdom: Animalia
- Phylum: Arthropoda
- Clade: Pancrustacea
- Class: Insecta
- Order: Psocodea
- Suborder: Troctomorpha
- Infraorder: Phthiraptera
- Parvorder: Anoplura
- Family: Enderleinellidae; Ewing, 1929

Family of booklice

Enderleinellidae is a family of parasitic lice in the order Psocodea. There are 5 genera and more than 50 described species in Enderleinellidae.

== Genera ==
These five genera belong to the family Enderleinellidae:

- Atopophthirus Kim, 1977
- Enderleinellus Fahrenholz, 1912
- Microphthirus Ferris, 1919
- Phthirunculus Kuhn & Ludwig, 1965
- Werneckia Ferris, 1951
