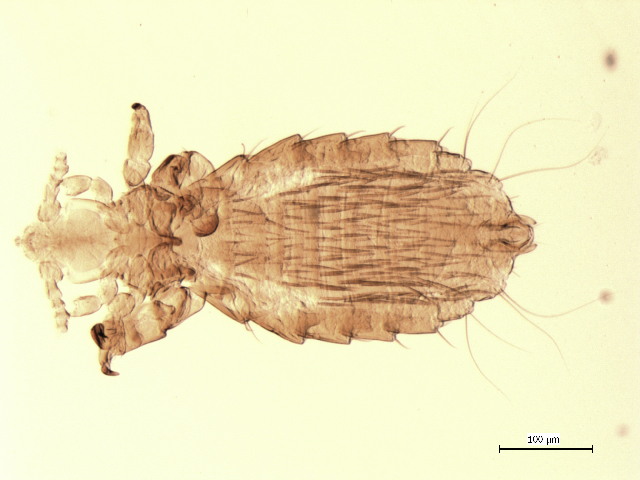
- Hoplopleura acanthopus

Scientific classification
- Kingdom: Animalia
- Phylum: Arthropoda
- Clade: Pancrustacea
- Class: Insecta
- Order: Psocodea
- Suborder: Troctomorpha
- Infraorder: Phthiraptera
- Parvorder: Anoplura
- Family: Hoplopleuridae; Ewing, 1929

= Hoplopleuridae =

Family of booklice

Hoplopleuridae is a family of lice in the order Psocodea. There are about 6 genera and more than 150 described species in Hoplopleuridae.

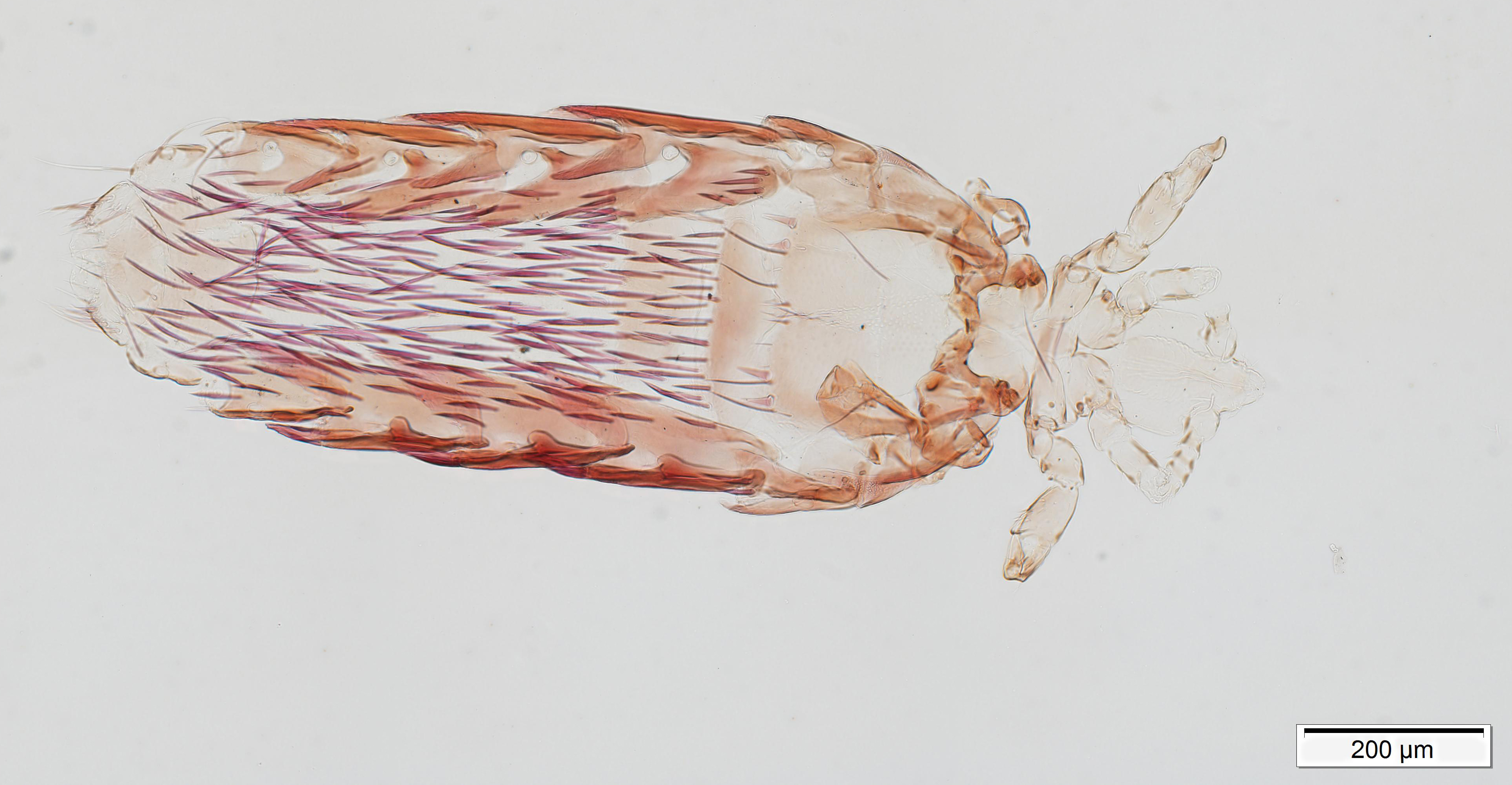
Schizophthirus pleurophaeus

== Genera ==
These six genera belong to the family Hoplopleuridae:

- Ancistroplax Waterston, 1929
- Haematopinoides Osborn, 1891
- Hoplopleura Enderlein, 1904
- Paradoxophthirus Chin, 1989
- Pterophthirus Ewing, 1923
- Schizophthirus Ferris, 1922
