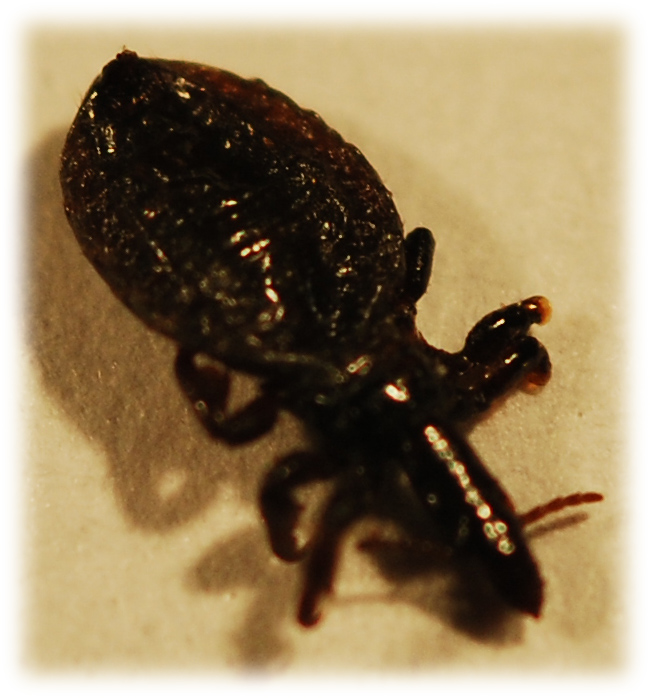
- Haematopinus apri

Scientific classification
- Kingdom: Animalia
- Phylum: Arthropoda
- Clade: Pancrustacea
- Class: Insecta
- Order: Psocodea
- Suborder: Troctomorpha
- Infraorder: Phthiraptera
- Parvorder: Anoplura
- Family: Haematopinidae; Enderlein, 1904
- Genus: Haematopinus; Leach, 1815

Species
- see text

= Haematopinus =

Genus of lice

Haematopinus is a genus of insects in the superfamily Anoplura, the sucking lice. It is the only genus in the family Haematopinidae, known commonly as the ungulate lice. All known species are of importance in veterinary medicine. These lice are some of the most economically important ectoparasites of domestic animals. Species infest many domesticated and wild large mammals, including cattle, horses, donkeys, swine, water buffalo, African buffalo, antelope, zebra, deer, and camels. The species Haematopinus tuberculatus has great importance in the water buffalo breading, since this louse is specific to buffaloes, being the main ectoparasite of the species, with important sanitary and economic burden. The Haematopinus tuberculatus is suspected to be involved in the transmission of diseases, such as anaplasmosis. The parasites are found infesting buffaloes in greater concentrations around the ears, base of horns, side of the neck, around the scrotum or udder, and especially at the tip of the tail.

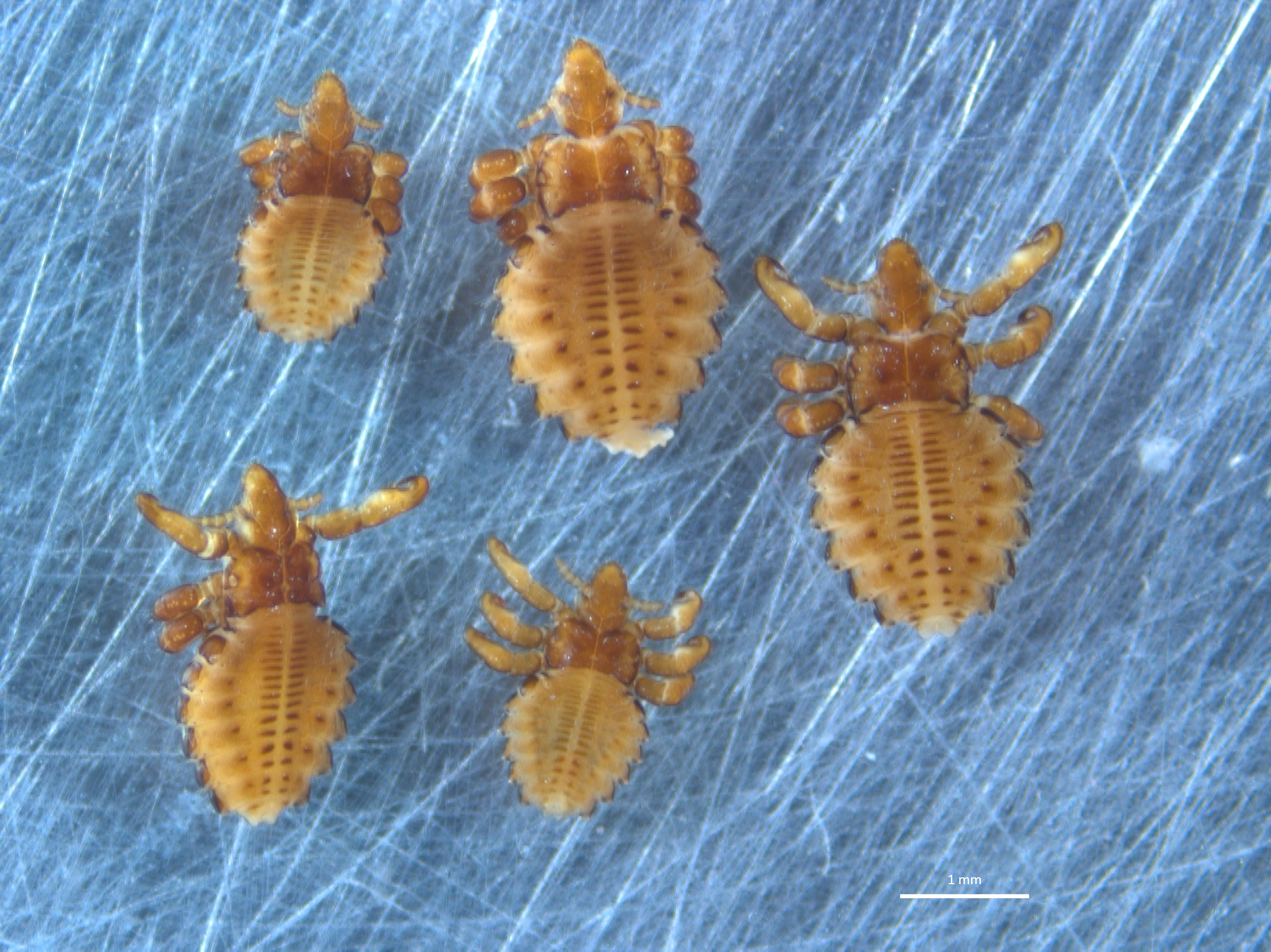
Haematopinus tuberculatus dorsal view

Species include:

- Haematopinus acuticeps
- Haematopinus apri
- Haematopinus asini – horse sucking louse
- Haematopinus breviculus
- Haematopinus bufali
- Haematopinus channabasavannai
- Haematopinus eurysternus – shortnosed cattle louse
- Haematopinus gorgonis
- Haematopinus jeannereti
- Haematopinus latus
- Haematopinus longus
- Haematopinus ludwigi
- Haematopinus meinertzhageni
- Haematopinus nigricantis
- Haematopinus oliveri – pygmy hog sucking louse
- Haematopinus oryx
- Haematopinus phacochoeri
- Haematopinus quadripertusus – cattle tail louse
- Haematopinus suis – hog louse
- Haematopinus taurotragi
- Haematopinus tuberculatus
