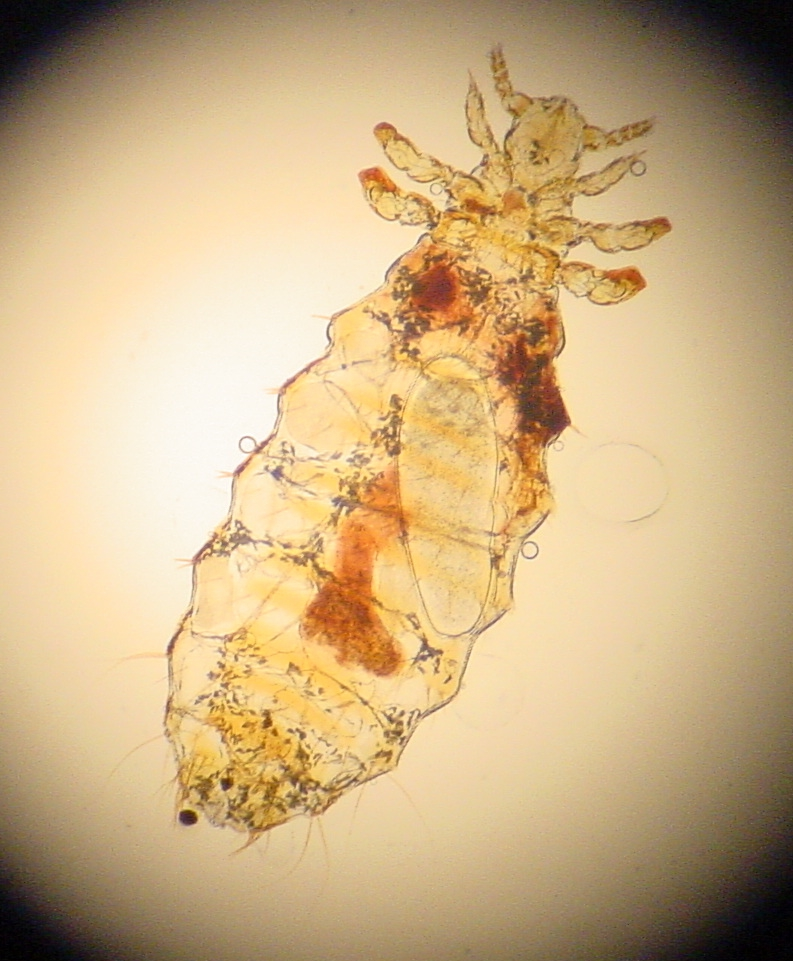
- Linognathus setosus

Scientific classification
- Kingdom: Animalia
- Phylum: Arthropoda
- Clade: Pancrustacea
- Class: Insecta
- Order: Psocodea
- Suborder: Troctomorpha
- Infraorder: Phthiraptera
- Parvorder: Anoplura
- Family: Linognathidae; Webb, 1946

= Linognathidae =

Family of booklice

Linognathidae is a family of lice in the order Psocodea. There are at least 3 genera and 70 described species in Linognathidae.

== Genera ==
These three genera belong to the family Linognathidae:

- Linognathus Enderlein, 1905
- Prolinognathus Ewing, 1929
- Solenopotes Enderlein, 1904
