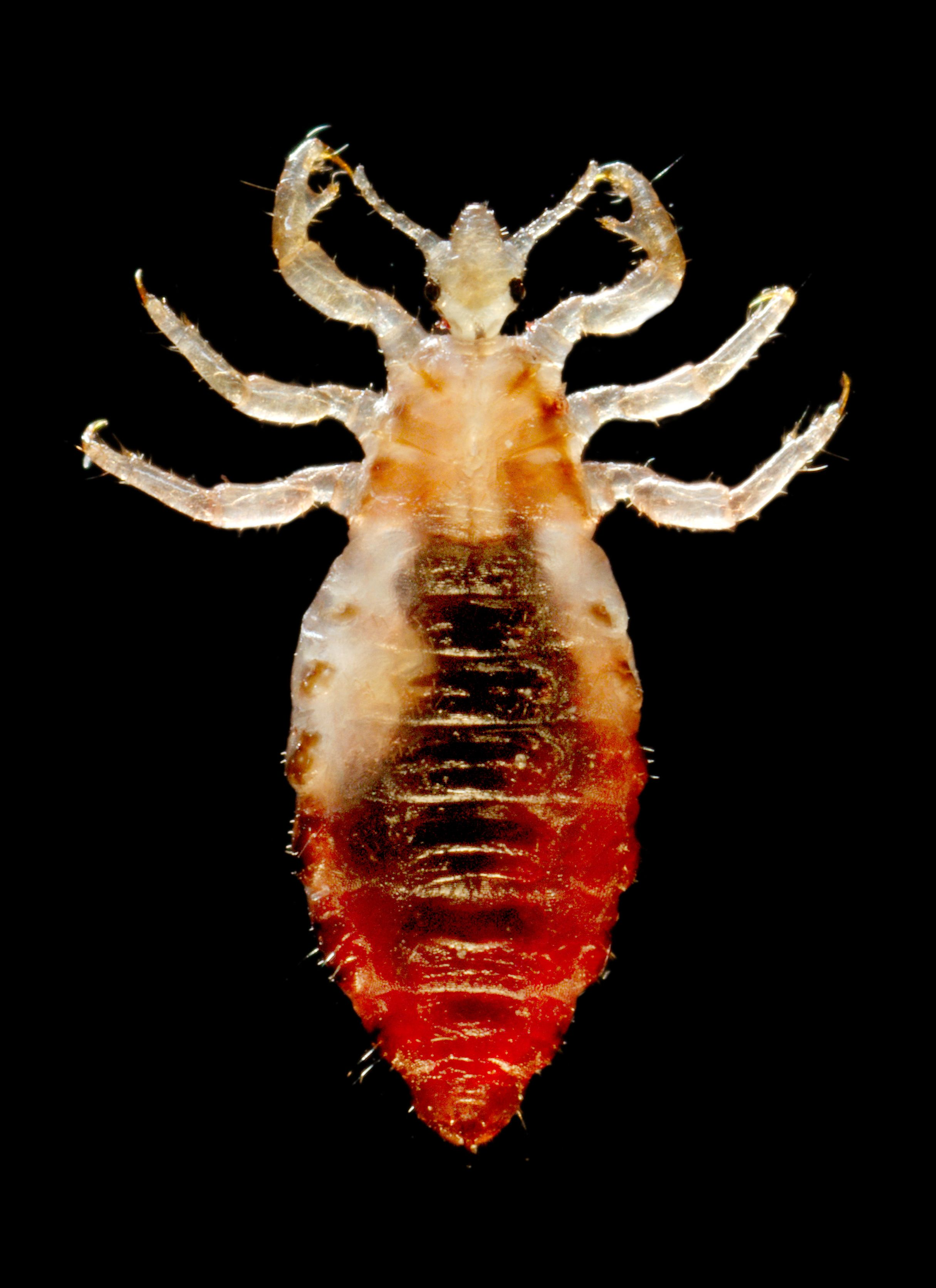

Scientific classification
- Kingdom: Animalia
- Phylum: Arthropoda
- Class: Insecta
- Order: Psocodea
- Infraorder: Phthiraptera
- Family: Pediculidae
- Genus: Pediculus
- Species: P. humanus
- Subspecies: P. h. humanus

Trinomial name
- Pediculus humanus humanus Linnaeus, 1758

= Body louse =

Subspecies of insect

The body louse (Pediculus humanus humanus, also known as Pediculus humanus corporis) or clothing louse, informally called the cootie, is a hematophagic ectoparasite louse that infests humans. It is one of three lice which infest humans, the other two being the head louse, and the crab louse or pubic louse.

Body lice may lay eggs on the host's hairs and clothing, but clothing is where the majority of eggs are usually secured.

Since body lice cannot jump or fly, they spread by direct contact with another person or more rarely by contact with clothing or bed sheets that are infested.

Body lice are disease vectors and can transmit pathogens that cause human diseases such as epidemic typhus, trench fever, and relapsing fever. In developed countries, infestations are only a problem in areas of poverty where there is poor body hygiene, crowded living conditions, and a lack of access to clean clothing. Outbreaks can also occur in situations where large groups of people are forced to live in unsanitary conditions. These types of outbreaks are seen globally in prisons, homeless populations, refugees of war, or when natural disasters occur and proper sanitation is not available.

== Life cycle and morphology ==
Pediculus humanus humanus (the body louse) is indistinguishable in appearance from Pediculus humanus capitis (the head louse), and the two subspecies will interbreed under laboratory conditions. In their natural state, however, they occupy different habitats and do not usually meet. They can feed up to five times a day. Adults can live for about thirty days, but if they are separated from their host they will die within two days. If the conditions are favorable, the body louse can reproduce rapidly. After the final molt, female and male lice will mate immediately. A female louse can lay up to 200–300 eggs during her lifetime.

The life cycle of the body louse consists of three stages: egg, nymph, and adult.

1. Eggs (also called nits, see head louse nits) are attached to the clothes or hairs by the female louse, using a secretion of the accessory glands that holds the egg in place until it hatches, while the nits (empty egg shells) may remain for months on the clothing. They are oval and usually yellow to white in color and at optimal temperature and humidity, the new lice will hatch from the egg within 6 to 9 days after being laid.
2. A nymph is an immature louse that hatches from the egg. Immediately after hatching it starts feeding on the host's blood and then returns to the clothing until the next blood-meal. The nymph will molt three times before the adult louse emerges. The nymph usually takes 9–12 days to develop into an adult louse.
3. The adult body louse is about 2.5–3.5 mm long, and like a nymph it has six legs. It is wingless and is tan to grayish-white in color.

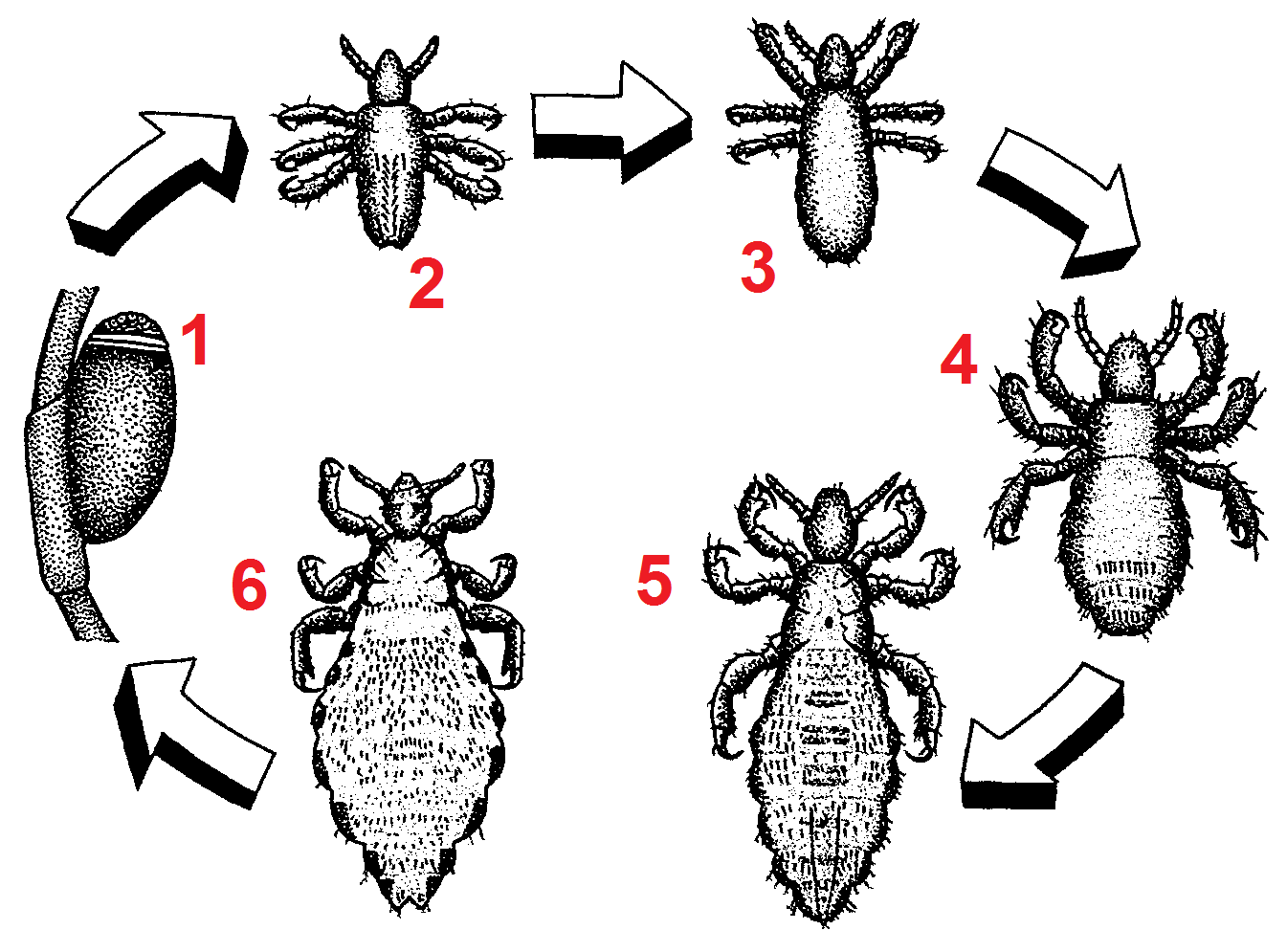
Life cycle of Pediculus humanus capitis, which is similar to the body louse. The location of the body louse eggs differs from that of head louse eggs. The head louse will lay eggs on hair roots, whereas a body louse will lay eggs in articles of clothing. This picture represents the louse from egg to adult and the process of going through three molts to achieve adulthood.

The two P. humanus subspecies are morphologically quite identical. Their heads are short with two antennae that are split into five segments each, compacted thorax, seven segmented abdomen with lateral paratergal plates.

== Origins ==
The body louse, it was thought, diverged from the head louse around 107,000 years ago, and this established the latest date for the adoption of clothing by humans. However, recent transcriptome analyses casts doubt on whether lice provide a means to date the origin of clothes since it has found that "body and head lice were almost genetically identical. Indeed, the phenotypic flexibility associated with the emergence of body lice, is probably a result of regulatory changes, perhaps epigenetic in origin, triggered by environmental signals."

Body lice were first described by Carl Linnaeus in the 10th edition of Systema Naturae. The human body louse had its genome sequenced in 2010, and at that time it had the smallest known insect genome.

The body louse belongs to the phylum Arthropoda, class Insecta, order Psocodea and family Pediculidae. There are roughly 5,000 species of lice described, with 4,000 parasitizing birds and an additional 800 special parasites of mammals worldwide. Lice on mammals originate on a common ancestor that lived on Afrotheria that originally acquired it via host-switching from an ancient avian host.

== Signs and symptoms ==
Since an infestation can include thousands of lice, with each of them biting five times a day, the bites can cause strong itching, especially at the beginning of the infestation, that can result in skin excoriations and secondary infections. If an individual is exposed to a long-term infestation, they may experience apathy, lethargy and fatigue.

== Treatment ==
In principle, body louse infestations can be controlled by periodically changing clothes and bedding. Thereafter, clothes, towels, and bedding should be washed in hot water (at least 50 °C or 122 °F) and dried using a hot cycle. The itching can be treated with topical and systemic corticosteroids and antihistamines. In case of secondary infections, antibiotics can be used to control the bacterial infection. When regular changing of clothes and bedding is not possible, the infested items could be treated with insecticides.

== Diseases caused ==
Unlike other species of lice, body lice can act as vectors of disease. The most important pathogens which are transmitted by them are Rickettsia prowazekii (causes epidemic typhus), Borrelia recurrentis (causes relapsing fever), and Bartonella quintana (causes trench fever).

Epidemic typhus can be treated with one dose of doxycycline, but if left untreated, the fatality rate is 30%. Relapsing fever can be treated with tetracycline and depending on the severity of the disease, if left untreated it has a fatality rate between 10 and 40%. Trench fever can be treated with either doxycycline or gentamicin, if left untreated the fatality rate is less than 1%.

== See also ==
- List of parasites of humans
