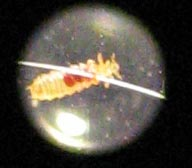
- Polyplax spinulosa

Scientific classification
- Domain: Eukaryota
- Kingdom: Animalia
- Phylum: Arthropoda
- Class: Insecta
- Order: Psocodea
- Family: Polyplacidae
- Genus: Polyplax; Enderlein, 1904

= Polyplax =

Genus of lice

Polyplax is a genus of lice belonging to the family Polyplacidae.

The genus has cosmopolitan distribution.

Species:

- Polyplax abyssinica Ferris, 1923
- Polyplax acomydis Kim, K.C. & Emerson, 1970
- Polyplax alaskensis H.E.Ewing, 1927
- Polyplax antennata Smetana, 1960
- Polyplax arvicanthis G.A.H.Bedford, 1919
- Polyplax asiatica Ferris, 1923
- Polyplax auricularis Kellogg & Ferris, 1915
- Polyplax biseriata Ferris, 1923
- Polyplax blanfordi A.C.Mishra & Dhanda, 1972
- Polyplax borealis Ferris, 1932
- Polyplax brachyrrhyncha Cummings, 1915
- Polyplax brachyuromyis Kim, K.C. & Emerson, 1974
- Polyplax bullimae P.T.Johnson, 1958
- Polyplax bureschi Touleshkov, 1957
- Polyplax calomysci Kim, K.C. & Emerson, 1971
- Polyplax caluri P.T.Johnson, 1960
- Polyplax cannomydis P.T.Johnson, 1959
- Polyplax chinensis Ferris, 1923
- Polyplax cummingsi Ferris, 1916
- Polyplax cutchicus A.C.Mishra & Kaul, 1973
- Polyplax dacnomydi Chin, 1990
- Polyplax dacnomydis Chin, 1990
- Polyplax dentaticornis H.E.Ewing, 1935
- Polyplax deomydis Benoit, 1969
- Polyplax dolichura P.T.Johnson, 1962
- Polyplax ellobii (Sosnina, 1955)
- Polyplax eropepli (H.E.Ewing, 1935)
- Polyplax expressa P.T.Johnson, 1964
- Polyplax gerbilli Ferris, 1923
- Polyplax gracilis Fahrenholz, 1910
- Polyplax grammomydis Werneck, 1953
- Polyplax grammomys Werneck, 1953
- Polyplax guatemalensis Durden & Eckerlin, 2001
- Polyplax hannswrangeli Eichler, 1952
- Polyplax hoogstraali P.T.Johnson, 1960
- Polyplax hopkinsi Paterson & P.M.Thompson, 1953
- Polyplax humae M.A.J.Khan & R.J.Khan, 1985
- Polyplax hurrianicus A.C.Mishra, 1981
- Polyplax indica A.C.Mishra & Kulkarni, 1974
- Polyplax insulsa Ferris, 1923
- Polyplax jonesi Kellogg & Ferris, 1915
- Polyplax kaiseri P.T.Johnson, 1960
- Polyplax kondana A.C.Mishra, 1981
- Polyplax longus (Werneck, 1948)
- Polyplax melasmothrixi Durden & Musser, 1992
- Polyplax meridionalis P.T.Johnson, 1962
- Polyplax miacantha Speiser, 1905
- Polyplax myotomydis P.T.Johnson, 1960
- Polyplax nesomydis Paulian, 1961
- Polyplax opimi Sosnina, 1979
- Polyplax otomydis Cummings, 1912
- Polyplax oxyrrhyncha Cummings, 1915
- Polyplax paradoxa P.T.Johnson, 1960
- Polyplax parataterae Kim, K.C. & Emerson, 1973
- Polyplax phloemydis Cuy, 1982
- Polyplax phloeomydis Cuy, 1982
- Polyplax phthisica Ferris, 1923
- Polyplax plesia P.T.Johnson, 1960
- Polyplax praecisa (L.G.Neumann, 1902)
- Polyplax praomydis G.A.H.Bedford, 1929
- Polyplax pricei Kim & K.C., 1968
- Polyplax qiuae Chin, 1993
- Polyplax reclinata (Nitzsch, 1864)
- Polyplax rhizomydis P.T.Johnson, 1972
- Polyplax roseinnesi Paterson & P.M.Thompson, 1953
- Polyplax serrata (Burmeister, 1839)
- Polyplax sindensis Shafi, Samad & Rehana, 1984
- Polyplax smallwoodae P.T.Johnson, 1960
- Polyplax solivaga P.T.Johnson, 1962
- Polyplax spinigera (Burmeister, 1839)
- Polyplax spinulosa (Burmeister, 1839)
- Polyplax steatomydis Pajot, 1967
- Polyplax stephensi (Christophers & Newstead, 1906)
- Polyplax subtaterae G.A.H.Bedford, 1936
- Polyplax tarsomydis H.E.Ewing, 1935
- Polyplax taterae Ferris, 1923
- Polyplax thamnomydis Pajot, 1966
- Polyplax vacillata P.T.Johnson, 1960
- Polyplax vicina Blagoveschtchensky, 1972
- Polyplax visenda Blagoveschtchensky, 1972
- Polyplax wallacei Durden, 1987
- Polyplax waterstoni G.A.H.Bedford, 1919
- Polyplax werneri (Glinkiewicz, 1907)
