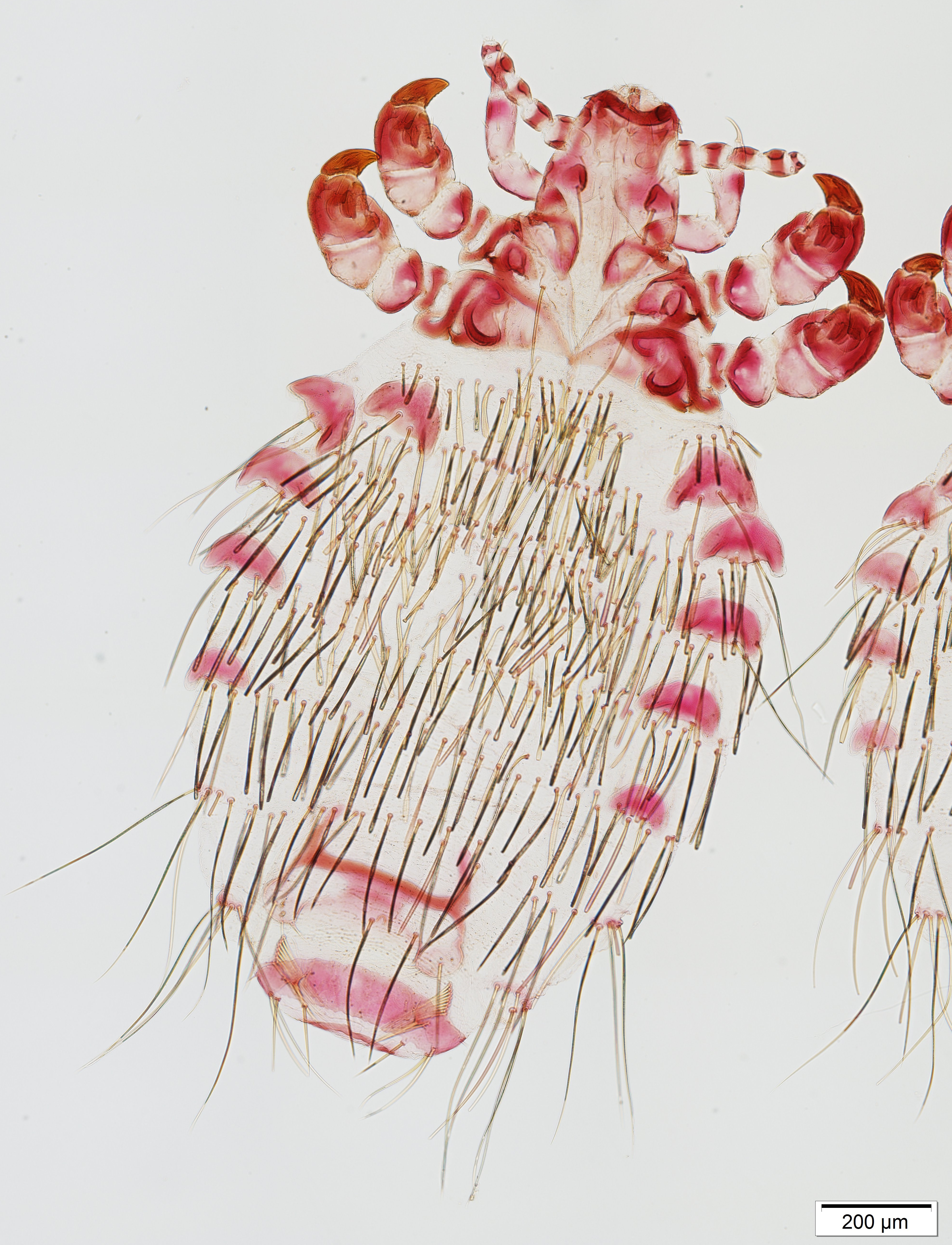
- Eulinognathus denticulatus

Scientific classification
- Kingdom: Animalia
- Phylum: Arthropoda
- Clade: Pancrustacea
- Class: Insecta
- Order: Psocodea
- Suborder: Troctomorpha
- Infraorder: Phthiraptera
- Parvorder: Anoplura
- Family: Polyplacidae; Fahrenholz, 1912

Genera
- See text

= Polyplacidae =

Family of lice

Polyplacidae is a family of lice in the suborder Anoplura, the sucking lice. Lice in this family are known commonly as the spiny rat lice. The family has a cosmopolitan distribution. As of 2010 there were 193 species.

These are small to medium-sized lice. They are usually sexually dimorphic. They have 5-segmented antennae and small, slender, clawed forelegs. Their middle and hindlegs may be almost equal in size, or the hindlegs may be larger.

Lice in this family are parasites of many types of small mammals, including spiny rats, cavies, rabbits, hares, chinchillas, bushbabies, lemurs, squirrels, shrews, pouched rats, treeshrews, hyraxes, and Oriental dormice.

Members of this family are quite variable based on its current description and molecular data suggest that the family is paraphyletic. It requires study and a revision to make the description of the family as a whole more accurate.

Genera include:

- Abrocomaphthirus
- Ctenophthirus
- Cuyana
- Docophthirus
- Eulinognathus
- Fahrenholzia
- Galeophthirus
- Haemodipsus
- Johnsonpthirus
- Lagidiophthirus
- Lemurpediculus
- Lemurphthirus
- Linognathoides
- Mirophthirus
- Neohaematopinus
- Phthirpediculus
- Polyplax
- Proenderleinellus
- Sathrax
- Scipio
- Typhlomyophthirus
