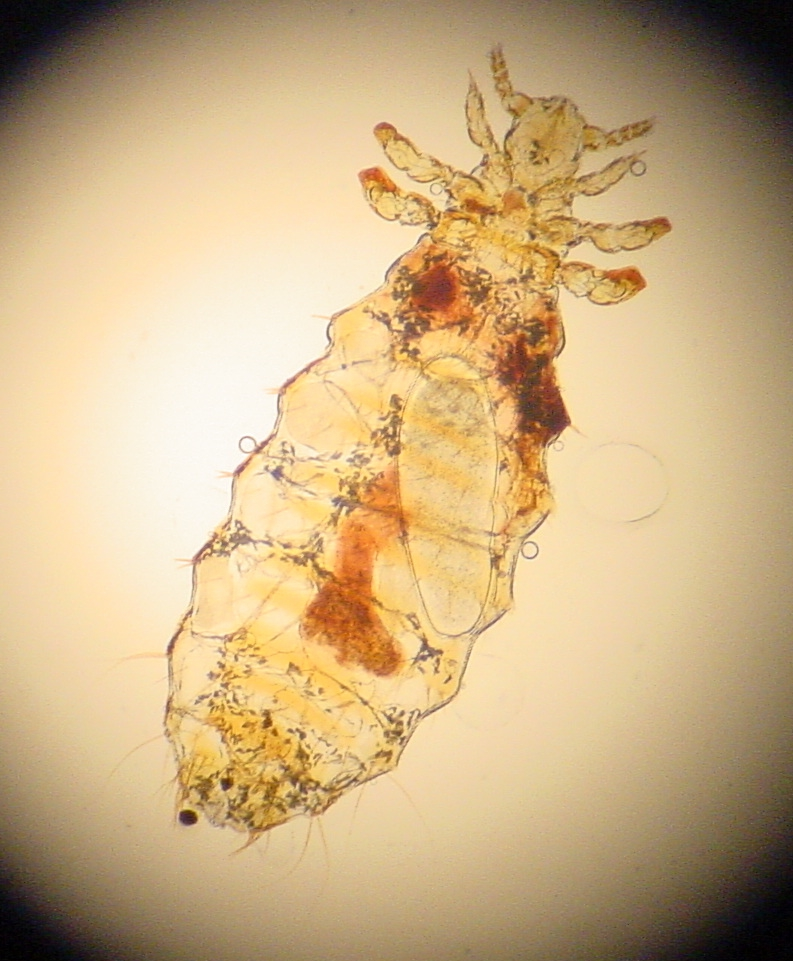
- Linognathus setosus (Linognathidae)

Scientific classification
- Kingdom: Animalia
- Phylum: Arthropoda
- Clade: Pancrustacea
- Class: Insecta
- Order: Psocodea
- Suborder: Troctomorpha
- Infraorder: Phthiraptera
- Parvorder: Anoplura; Leach, 1815

Families
- Echinophthiriidae; Enderleinellidae; Haematopinidae; Hamophthiriidae; Hoplopleuridae; Hybophthiridae; Linognathidae; Microthoraciidae; Neolinognathidae; Pecaroecidae; Pedicinidae; Pediculidae; Polyplacidae; Pthiridae; Ratemiidae

Synonyms
- Siphunculata

= Sucking louse =

Parvorder of insects

Sucking lice (known scientifically as Anoplura) are a parvorder of around 550 species of lice. All sucking lice are blood-feeding ectoparasites of mammals. They can cause localized skin irritations and are vectors of several blood-borne diseases.

At least three species or subspecies of Anoplura are parasites of humans; the human condition of being infested with sucking lice is called pediculosis. Pediculus humanus is divided into two subspecies, Pediculus humanus humanus, or the human body louse, sometimes nicknamed "the seam squirrel" for its habit of laying of eggs in the seams of clothing, and Pediculus humanus capitis, or the human head louse. Pthirus pubis (the human pubic louse) is the cause of the condition known as crabs.

== Classification ==
Sucking lice are classified as a parvorder called Anoplura, named by Leach in 1815. Anoplura belongs to the infraorder Phthiraptera, which contains all lice, and is part of the larger order Psocodea, which also contains booklice, barklice and barkflies.

=== External phylogeny ===
A cladogram showing the position of Anoplura within Phthiraptera and Psocodea is shown below:

- Psocodea
  - - Troctomorpha
      - - - Phthiraptera
            - - Philopteridae
              - - - Anoplura
                  - Rhynchophthirina
                - Trichodectidae
            - Amblycera
          - Liposcelididae
        - - Pachytroctidae
          - Sphaeropsocidae
      - Amphientometae
    - Psocomorpha
      - - - Homilopsocidea
          - Caeciliusetae
        - - - Psocetae
            - Epipsocetae
          - Philotarsetae
      - Archipsocetae
  - Trogiomorpha
    - - Atropetae
      - Psyllipsocetae
    - Prionoglaridetae (paraphyletic)

=== Internal phylogeny ===
A cladogram showing the internal phylogeny of Anoplura is shown below, with paraphyletic groupings noted:

- Anoplura
  - - Echinophthiriidae
    - - - Linognathidae
        - - Hoplopleuridae (paraphyletic)
            - Hoplopleura trispinosa
            - - - - Hoplopleura arizonensis
                  - Hoplopleura hirsuta
                - - - Hoplopleura ferrisi 1 (paraphyletic)
                    - Hoplopleura ferrisi 3 (paraphyletic)
                    - - Hoplopleura ferrisi 2 (paraphyletic)
                      - Hoplopleura reithrodontomydis
                    - Hoplopleura hesperomydis
                  - Hoplopleura onychomydis
                - Hoplopleura sicata
                - - Hoplopleura aitkeni
                  - Pterophthirus imitans
                - - - - Hoplopleura fonsecai
                      - Hoplopleura travassosi
                    - Hoplopleura new sp.
                  - Hoplopleura rimae
                  - Hoplopleura tiptoni
                - Hoplopleura quadridentata
              - Pterophthirus splendica
          - Hoplopleura erratica (Hoplopleuridae)
          - Polyplacidae (paraphyletic)
            Linognathoides
      - Polyplacidae (paraphyletic)
        - - Neohaematopinus sciuri
          - Neohaematopinus neotomae
        - Neohaematopinus sciuropteri
        - Haemodipsus
        - Sathrax
  - - Haematopinidae
    - Polyplacidae (paraphyletic)
      Lemurpediculus
  - - Hoplopleuridae (paraphyletic)
      Ancistroplax
    - - Polyplacidae (paraphyletic)
        Polyplax
      - - - Pediculidae
          - Pthiridae
        - Pedicinidae
  - Polyplacidae (paraphyletic)
    Fahrenhalzia

== Characteristics ==
Sucking lice are typically flattened and wingless, with sharp claws on their legs that are used to attach themselves to hair or human clothing. All sucking lice suck blood through a small proboscis that is usually kept inside of their head. Their color typically ranges between a mixture of yellow and white. There are around 540 different species of Anoplura, and unlike the closely related Mallophaga, sucking lice only parasitize mammals.

Sucking lice bodies are typically oblong, with a flattened body and a head that is rounded in the front and smaller than the thorax. The lice have anywhere from three to five separate thread–like antennae on top of the end of the head that is used to help navigate their surroundings. The head tends to slightly widen next to the antennae. The antennae are composed of three to five equal sized joints that are used to aid in sensing their surrounding. The thorax contains two irregularly shaped triangular plates that help defend the insect's interior. Most sucking lice are no more than two millimeters in length.

=== Life cycle ===
All sucking lice undergo a process of slow metamorphosis, with three life stages of egg, nymph and adult. The entire process of Anoplura's growth occurs whilst on their host; however, they are able to survive for small periods of time in outside environments. Once a female louse matures, they will lay large amounts of small eggs (also known as nits) on the individual hairs of hosts. Nits are usually between 0.3 and 0.8 millimeters long, and are often pale in color or nearly transparent.

== Feeding method ==
Sucking lice live exclusively on the outside of their hosts, making them considered ectoparasites. The louse's proboscis consists of two distinct tubes, with the upper being called a rostrum, and the lower being called a stylet. The lice will use their upper mouth piece to latch onto the skin with teeth–like structures, maintaining a firm hold during their feeding. The lower mouth piece consists of two stylets, also known as stabbers. After the rostrum obtains a firm hold, the stylets will penetrate the skin with the serrated edges in a saw–like fashion. The louse will then regurgitate saliva through the proboscis inside of the body, before proceeding to suck the host's blood in what has been described as a "pumping action". Different species of sucking louse have specialised anatomy to help parasitize on different mammals and to help survive various climates.

== Effects ==
=== In humans ===
Anoplura contains three species of lice that parasitize humans. Anoplura body lice (Pediculus humanus humanus) typically carry the potential of causing skin irritation, and are vectors of multiple blood-born diseases. Common symptoms of Anoplura body lice include relapsing fever, trench fever and epidemic typhus. Due to increased societal standards for hygiene, body lice in general is significantly less prevalent in developed regions. During the American Civil War, body lice were colloquially known as "seam squirrels" due to their tendency to lay eggs within the seams of soldier's clothes. Anoplura head lice (Pediculus humanus capitis) is significantly more common than pubic or body lice, with studies reporting an infestation rate between 3.6% and 61.4% from countries in North and South America. Cases of head lice are most common in children between the ages of 3 and 11. Pthirus pubis (also known as pubic lice or crabs) is a species of sucking lice that affects the genitals of humans, and is the cause of Pediculosis pubis. Pubic lice are often mistaken as sexually transmitted infections due to frequently being contracted through sexual contact; however, they are only considered parasites as they can be spread through non-sexual methods such as sharing blankets or towels.

=== In other animals ===
Dogs can be affected by three individual species of Anoplura lice: Linognathus setosus, Heterodoxus spiniger and Trichodectes canis. Dogs infested by lice show symptoms of discomfort such as rubbing, scratching and biting areas affected. Coats of affected animals are often rough to the touch, and can become matted over time if left untreated. Severe infestations of sucking lice can lead to anemia from the loss of blood as well. Lice in dogs can only be contracted through either direct or indirect contact with another infested dog, and cannot be transferred across different species.

Cats are not affected by Anoplura lice, rather they can only contract the species Felicola subrostrata, a type of chewing lice.

Most cattle species can be affected by sucking lice, with certain lice species being specially adapted to their preferred cattle and unable to be transferred across any other species. Anoplura lice can only live off of the animal for a few days. Female lice specialized to cattle tend to lay a single egg every day for around 2 to 3 weeks. Similar to sucking lice in dogs, severe infestations can cause cattle to experience anemia, with newborn calves being particularly vulnerable.

== Families ==
These 15 families are generally recognized in the Anoplura:

| Family | Authority | Host |
|---|---|---|
| Echinophthiriidae | Enderlein, 1904 | Seals/Sea Lions & Otters |
| Enderleinellidae | Ewing, 1929 | Squirrels |
| Haematopinidae | Enderlein, 1904 | Ungulates (Artiodactyls & Equids) |
| Hamophthiriidae | Johnson, 1969 | Colugos |
| Hoplopleuridae | Ewing, 1929 | Shrews & Moles (Soricomorpha), Pikas, Rodents |
| Hybophthiridae | Ewing, 1929 | Aardvarks |
| Linognathidae | Webb, 1946 | Artiodactyls, Canids, Hyraxes |
| Microthoraciidae | Kim & Lugwig, 1978 | Camels & Llamas |
| Neolinognathidae | Fahrenholz, 1936 | Elephant Shrews (Macroscelidea) |
| Pecaroecidae | von Kéler, 1963 | Peccaries |
| Pedicinidae | Enderlein, 1904 | New World Primates |
| Pediculidae | Leach, 1817 | Old World Primates |
| Polyplacidae | Fahrenholz, 1912 | Rodents, Rabbits, Shrews, Tree Shrews, Primates (Lemurs & Bush Babies) |
| Pthiridae | Ewing, 1929 | Old World Primates |
| Ratemiidae | Kim & Lugwig, 1978 | Equids |

== See also ==
- Mallophaga
