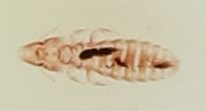
- R. (R.) ortygometrae
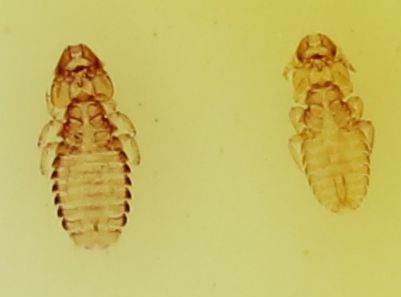
- Female and male R. (A.) gadowi

Scientific classification
- Kingdom: Animalia
- Phylum: Arthropoda
- Class: Insecta
- Order: Psocodea
- Infraorder: Phthiraptera
- Family: Philopteridae
- Genus: Rallicola; Johnston & Harrison, 1911

Type species
- Nirmus attenuatus Burmeister, 1838

Synonyms
- Corvicola Carriker, 1949; Epipicus Carriker, 1949; Furnaricola Carriker, 1944; Oncophorus Piaget, 1880 (nec Rudow, 1870); Parricola Harrison, 1915; Psophiicola Eichler, 1982

= Rallicola =

Genus of lice

Rallicola is a genus of chewing louse. It is an ectoparasite of rails and other birds. It was named by Thomas Harvey Johnston and Launcelot Harrison in 1911. There are two subgenera aside from the nominotypical subgenus: Aptericola, whose species are found on kiwis, and Huiacola, a monospecific subgenus consisting of Rallicola extinctus, once found on the huia.

== Taxonomic history ==
In 1866, Ferdinand Rudow circumscribed the Philopteridae genus Trabeculus with Trabeculus schillingi as its type species. In 1870, he created a new genus, Oncophorus with the same type species, making it an objective junior synonym of Trabeculus. In 1880, Édouard Piaget added more species to Oncophorus. He listed the author citation as "Rud." for Rudow in 1880, but as "m." for mihi to indicate himself in 1885.

Thomas Harvey Johnston and Launcelot Harrison created a new genus name, Rallicola, in 1911. A new name was needed as Oncophorus Piaget, 1880 and Oncophorus Rudow, 1870 had a senior homonym and senior synonym, respectively. They only included Oncophorus Piaget, 1880 species that parasitized rails and jacanas, leaving those that parasitized owls and hornbills to other genera.

In 1915, Harrison split the genus into three subgenera: Rallicola (Rallicola) for species found on Rallidae (rails), Rallicola (Parricola) for those species found on Parridae, and Rallicola (Aptericola) for species found on Apterygidae (kiwis). Harrison's 1916 list of Mallophaga species recognized sixteen valid species in Rallicola, one in Parricola and three in Aptericola.

In 1990, Eberhard Mey described a new species, Huiacola extinctus and circumscribed a new genus, Huiacola for it. Huiacola was subsequently classified as a subgenus of Rallicola.

=== Type species ===
Johnston and Harrison designated "O. attenuatus N." as its type species. This referred to a species Christian Ludwig Nitzsch named Philopterus (Nirmus) attenuatus, which Édouard Piaget included in his 1880 taxonomy of Oncophorus.

However, Nitzch's use of this name was nomen nudum as it was only accompanied with a queried indication to a previously-described taxon, namely Franz von Paula Schrank's 1781 description of Pediculus ortygometrae. The name only became available in 1838 as Nirmus attenatus, when Hermann Burmeister provided the same indication to Schrank but without marking it as questionable.

=== Synonyms ===
As of 2017, six synonyms for this genus are recognized. Hopkins and Clay designated Oncophorus bisetosus Piaget, 1880 as the type species of Piaget's Oncophorus. Harrison listed the type species of his subgenus Parricola as "Rallicola (Parricola) sulcata Piaget", i.e., Oncophorus sulcatus Piaget, 1880.

Three of its junior synonyms were named and circumscribed by M. A. Carriker, Jr. Carriker named the genus Furnaricola in 1944; his circumscription included its type species F. acutifrons (with two subspecies, F. a. acutifrons and F. a. subsimilis) as well as F. cephalosa, F. chunchotambo, F. heterocephala, F. laticephala, F. parvigenitalis, and F. titicacae, which were all described in the same work. In a 1949 paper, he created the genus Epipicus for his new species E. scapanoides. In another paper published in 1949, he named the genus Corvicola, which consisted of his newly-described species C. insulana. By 1952, Hopkins and Clay had classified Furnaricola, Epipicus, and Corvicola as junior synonyms of Rallicola. In a 1966 paper, Carriker defended the validity of Furnaricola as a distinct genus. Roger D. Price and K.C. Emerson treated Furnaricola as its own genus in 1987, but in 1993 Price and Dale Clayton concurred with Hopkins and Clay's synonymization.

In 1982, Wolfdietrich Eichler circumscribed the genus Psophiicola. Its type species is Liperus foedus Nitzsch in Giebel, 1866, which he transferred from Rallicola. This was the only species included in his circumscription.

== Hosts ==
In 1953, Theresa Clay reported that Rallicola have been found on 47 species across 25 genera of Rallidae. Rallicola can also be found on birds in the Aramidae (limpkins), and Psophiidae (trumpeters) families. The sole Huiacola species R. (H.) extinctus was found on the extinct huia bird, in the family Callaeidae. Species in Aptericola are found on Apterygidae (kiwi birds).

== Distribution ==
The subgenera Huiacola and Aptericola are both endemic to New Zealand. Species in the subgenus Rallicola can be found in North America, the Pacific Islands, and New Zealand. An undescribed Rallicola (Rallicola) species was recorded in the Galápagos Islands in 2013.

== Subgenera and species ==
Three subgenera are recognized, including the nominate subgenus.

=== Rallicola ===
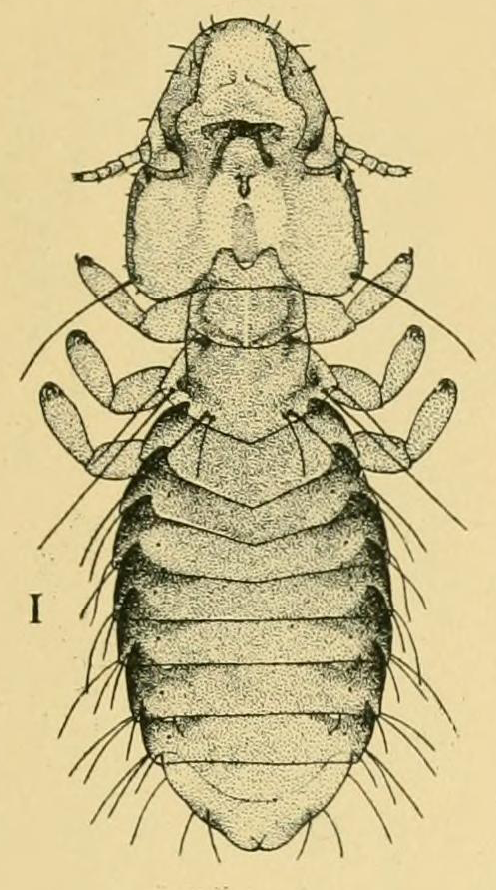
R. (R.) advenus

Rallicola Johnston & Harrison, 1911. Type species: Nirmus attenuatus Burmeister, 1838. Approximately 90 species, including:

- Rallicola acutifrons (Carriker, 1944)
- Rallicola advenus (Kellogg, 1896)
- Rallicola cephalosa (Carriker, 1944)
- Rallicola chunchotambo (Carriker, 1944)
- Rallicola cuspidatus (Scopoli, 1763)
- Rallicola foedus (Nitzsch [In Giebel], 1866)
- Rallicola funebris (Nitzsch [In Giebel], 1866)
- Rallicola heterocephala (Carriker, 1944)
- Rallicola insulana (Carriker, 1949)
- Rallicola laticephala (Carriker, 1944)
- Rallicola ortygometrae (Schrank, 1781)
- Rallicola parvigenitalis (Carriker, 1944)
- Rallicola piageti Clay, 1953 - possibly coextinct; host New Caledonian rail
- Rallicola scapanoides (Carriker, 1949)
- Rallicola titicacae (Carriker, 1944)
- Rallicola zumpti (Kéler, 1951)
- †Rallicola guami Carriker, 1949 - probable conservation-induced extinction; host Guam rail

=== Aptericola ===
Aptericola Harrison, 1915. Type species: Rallicola (Aptericola) gadowi Harrison, 1915. Four species:

- Rallicola gadowi Harrison, 1915
- Rallicola gracilentus Clay, 1953
- Rallicola rodericki Palma, 1991
- †Rallicola pilgrimi Clay, 1972 - conservation-induced extinction; host little spotted kiwi

=== Huiacola ===
Huiacola Mey, 1990. Type species: Huiacola extinctus Mey, 1990. One species:

- †Rallicola extinctus (Mey, 1990) - coextinct; host huia
