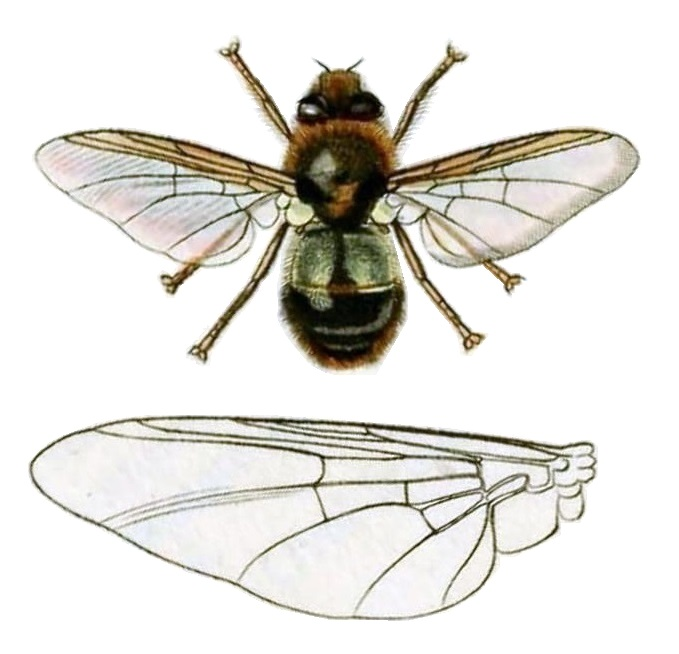

Scientific classification
- Kingdom: Animalia
- Phylum: Arthropoda
- Class: Insecta
- Order: Diptera
- Family: Oestridae
- Genus: Gasterophilus
- Species: G. nasalis

Binomial name
- Gasterophilus nasalis (Linnaeus, 1758)

= Gasterophilus nasalis =

Species of fly

Gasterophilus nasalis (also called throat bot fly or horse nasal bot fly) is a species of the genus Gasterophilus and family Oestridae. This species is found worldwide, but prominently present within the summer months. This species of G. nasalis primarily targets equines, such as horses, donkeys and the plains zebra. However, it's known that it targets cattle as well, along with mild cases of companion animals.

== Occurrence ==
Besides the Gasterophilus intestinalis, the Gasterophilus Nasalis is the most common horse bottle fly.

In a research paper from 1951 to 1973, 80.6% of horses examined in Kentucky were hosts of the Gasterophilus nasalis in the second or third instar. In Morocco, they occurred together with the G. intestinalis. While third instar larvae were present during the whole year, larvae in the second instar were only present in April. Young horses were more likely to be infected with the parasite.

== Life cycle ==
Horse bottle flies lay their eggs typically around the submaxillary area on the hair of the equine. Unlike other Gasterophilus species, the larva hatches spontaneously, and the hatch is not triggered by an environmental factor. Once the larva hatched, it crawls to the mouth and enters the oral cavity, where it spends up to 21 days in the tissue of the tongue. In the second instar, the larva relocates, after approximately four weeks in the oral cavity, into the stomach, more specific, to the pylorus. Here, they get into the third instar before the Gasterophilus nasalis is excreted. After another 3–5 weeks in the soil the fly is fully developed and adult. All in all a horse bottle fly spends up to 10 months in the equine body.

== Symptoms ==
The Gasterophilus nasalis does barely cause clinical symptoms. It might be possible to spot a larva either on the fur or in and around the oral cavity. The most common symptoms are: extreme salivation, shaking of the head, problems with chewing and general irritation of the oral cavity.

== Diagnosis ==
The infestation with Gasterophilus nasalis can easily be overseen by the owner. It might be possible to spot a larva either on the fur or in and around the oral cavity. Rarely, it can also be noticed in the excretions. When a larva or egg is found on the fur, this indicates the infection of the whole herd, for during grooming, the eggs and larvae are easily transferred from one individual to another.

== Treatment ==
A typical treatment against Gasterophilus nasalis is Ivermectin, which diminish the oral larva as well as the gastric. It is usually used with 0.2 milligram per kilogram. Moxidectin, which is also used, is not proved to increase the gastric larva, but only the ones in the oral cavity.

=== Prevention ===
Since the Gasterophilus species occur very often, a general treatment with Ivermectin can be done in autumn, also in non freezing temperatures. It is recommended to remove eggs spotted on the fur.
