= Gasterophilus pecorum =

Scientific classification
- Kingdom: Animalia
- Phylum: Arthropoda
- Clade: Pancrustacea
- Class: Insecta
- Order: Diptera
- Family: Oestridae
- Genus: Gasterophilus
- Species: G. pecorum

Binomial name
- Gasterophilus pecorum (Fabricius, 1794)

Species of fly

Gasterophilus pecorum is a species of botfly within the genus Gasterophilus that is an obligate parasite of horses and other equids.

Gasterophilus pecorum is found in the desert steppe of Xinjiang, China, where it is the most prevalent botfly species. In Kalamaili Nature Reserve (KNR), China, G. pecorum is a major problem for the health of Przewalski's horse, which has been reintroduced in the area. Gasterophilus pecorum has also been observed infecting equids, such as the Persian Onager (Equus hemionus onager). Of the six identified species of Gasterophilus found within the KNR, G. pecorum is responsible for a majority of all botfly infections.

== Taxonomy ==
=== Larvae ===
G. pecorum larvae have several larval instars, these larvae move throughout their host's digestive tract while going through these life stages. Similar to other members of the genus Gasterophilus, in their last larval stage G. pecorum have a set of hooked mouth parts, which is used to help attach themselves to their host's gastrointestinal tract. After completing this life stage, the larvae are released via the host's excrement, and it then becomes a pupa then eventually into an adult.

=== Adults ===
Adult G. pecorum similar to other members of Gasterophilus can resemble honey bees, as they have dark patches of brown and yellow hairs.

== Life cycle ==
G. pecorum has four main life stages: egg, larvae, pupae, and adult. Unlike the other species of Gasterophilus, who usually lay their eggs on the hair of the equids, adult G. pecorum lay eggs on blades of grass like the Stipa caucasica, near water and the paths used by the equids. Once the egg is consumed by the host, a larva emerges and makes its way into equid's digestive tract where it will remain for 9–10 months to mature, and in the process will go through three larval instars. After the larva is finished developing, it then is released from the host via the host's feces. Here the larva pupate and turn into adults. Adults only live for about 1–4 days since they cannot eat, but they are capable of producing large amounts of eggs. This alongside G. pecorum oviposition strategies have allowed them to become responsible for a majority of the botfly infections in KNR.

== Prevention ==
An infection of G. pecorum is a major problem for an equid. The larval instars of G. pecorum can cause their host to develop gastrointestinal myiasis, and these infections have also been shown to affect the microbiomes of the host. Equids may take oral medications, avermectins for example, to help reduce botfly infections. It is recommended that the equids be treated once in the early summer and once again in the fall to help minimize the later larval instars.
