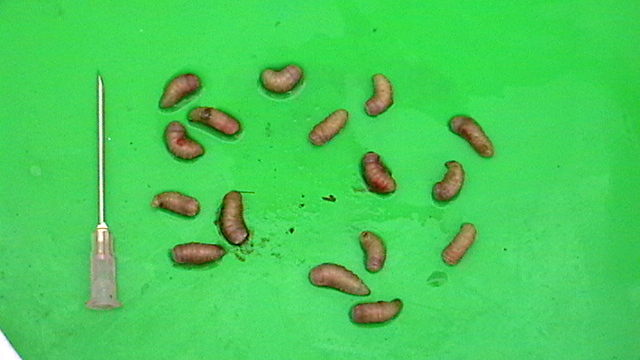

Scientific classification
- Kingdom: Animalia
- Phylum: Arthropoda
- Clade: Pancrustacea
- Class: Insecta
- Order: Diptera
- Family: Oestridae
- Genus: Gasterophilus
- Species: G. haemorrhoidalis

Binomial name
- Gasterophilus haemorrhoidalis (Linnaeus, 1758)

Synonyms
- Oestrus haemorrhoidalis Linnaeus 1758

= Gasterophilus haemorrhoidalis =

Species of fly

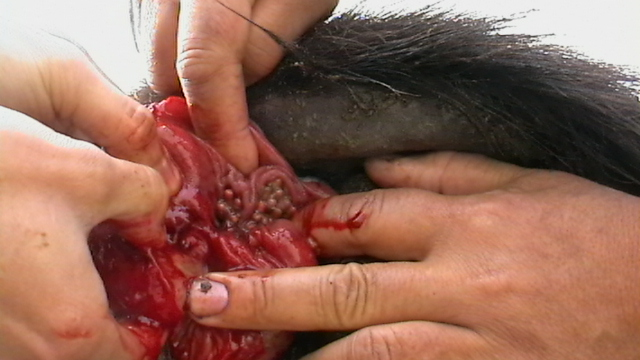
In rectum of a mule with anal prolapse

Gasterophilus haemorrhoidalis (also called nose botfly or lip botfly) is a species of the genus Gasterophilus that lays eggs on the lips and around the mouth of horses, mules and donkeys. Their hatching is simulated by moisture from licking or feeding of hosts.

- First instar development: Penetrates epidermis of the lips of hosts and migrate into mouth.
- Second instar: Moves to stomach and duodenum of the small intestine
- Third instar: Larvae become detached after some time and then pass to the rectum and re-attach themselves.

Nose botflys appear with a postsutural scutum with ground color uniformly brown or black legs yellowish brown, with femora distinctly darkened; abdomen ground color dark brown or black, with reddish-yellow or orangish setae posteriorl. Males possess a surstylus that abruptly tapers distally, with short surstylar setae that reach at most halfway to the sagittal plane. Regarding egg description, the pedicel is long and slender, with a width/length ratio of approximately 1/6 in lateral view, comprising 2/5 of the total egg length.

Their eggs are pedicel long and slender, with width/length ratio around 1/6 in lateral view, accounting for 2/5 of the total egg length.

In Equidae, third-stage larvae attach to the stomach, but also to the rectum, sometimes in great numbers. Heavy infestation can cause anal prolapse in foals and mules.

They do not parasitise humans.
