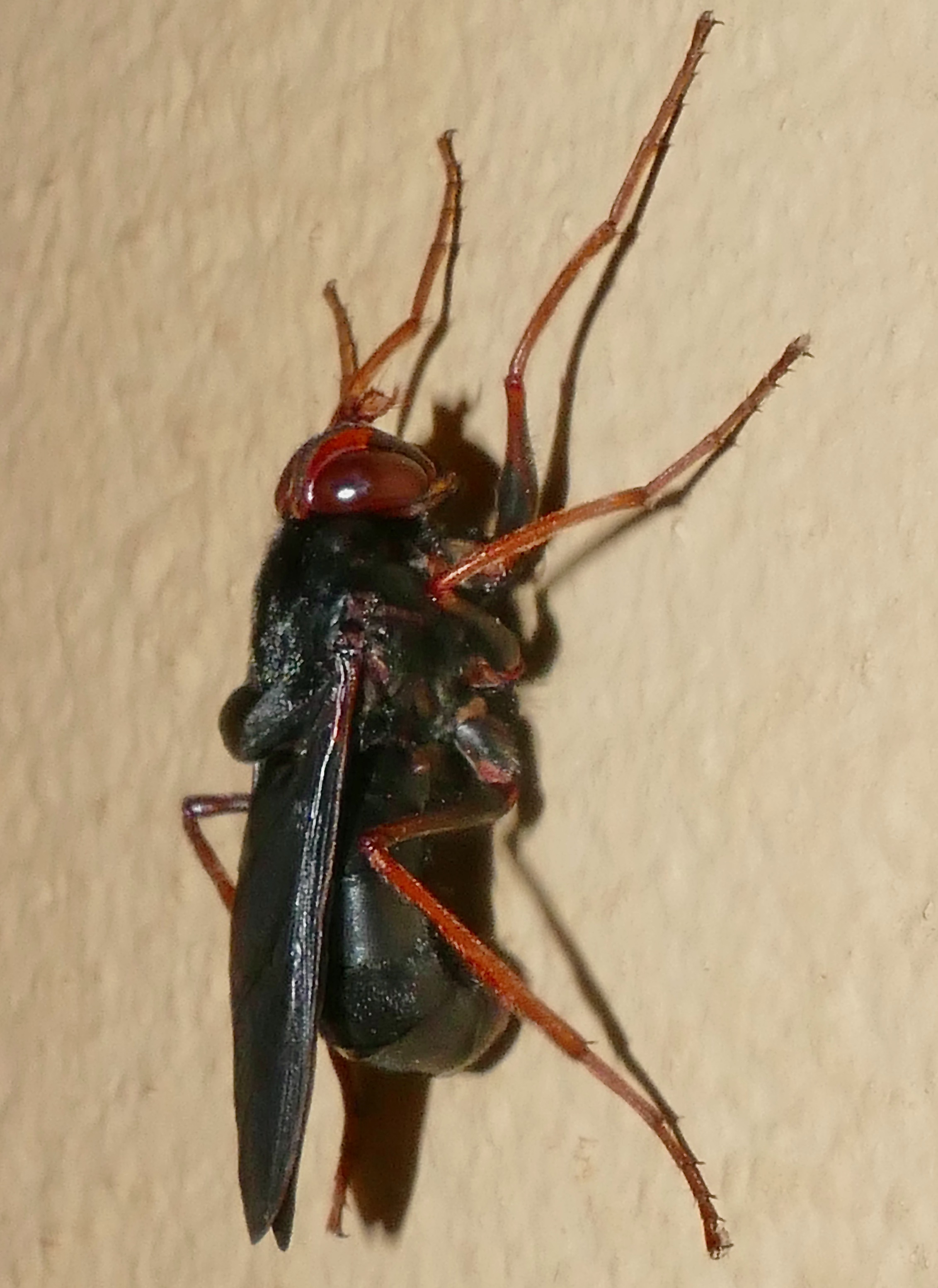
- Gyrostigma rhinocerontis

Scientific classification
- Domain: Eukaryota
- Kingdom: Animalia
- Phylum: Arthropoda
- Class: Insecta
- Order: Diptera
- Family: Oestridae
- Subfamily: Gasterophilinae
- Genus: Gyrostigma; Hope, 1840

Species
- G. rhinocerontis †G. conjungens †G. sumatrensis

= Gyrostigma =

Genus of flies

Gyrostigma is a genus of botfly which parasitize rhinoceroses. The best-known species is Gyrostigma rhinocerontis, the rhinoceros stomach botfly, which develops in the stomach lining of the black rhinoceros and white rhinoceros of Africa, and the adult of which is the largest fly known in Africa.

== Species ==
Two other species are known. G. conjungens was discovered in the stomach of a Kenyan black rhinoceros in 1901, but has not been observed since 1961, so it is presumed extinct. The other is G. sumatrensis, which was found in a captive Sumatran rhinoceros in 1884 but has similarly not been observed since and is also considered possibly extinct. Due to the difficulty of observing these short-lived flies, it is possible that there are other species corresponding to the other species of rhinoceros, but they remain undescribed. It is also possible that several species of Gyrostigma are extinct because rhinoceros populations are tiny owing to their state of endangerment.
