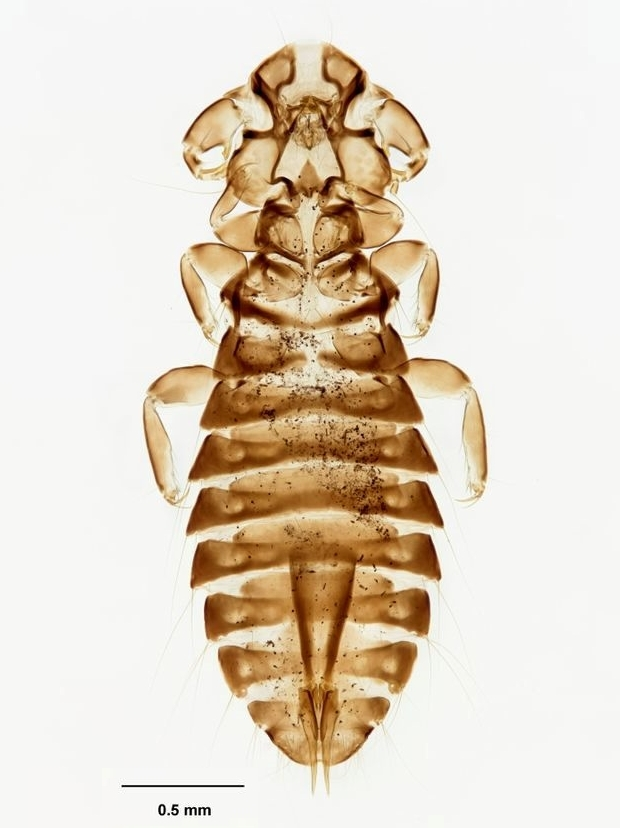

Conservation status
- Extinct (1907) (NZ TCS)

Scientific classification
- Kingdom: Animalia
- Phylum: Arthropoda
- Clade: Pancrustacea
- Class: Insecta
- Order: Psocodea
- Infraorder: Phthiraptera
- Family: Philopteridae
- Genus: Rallicola
- Subgenus: †Huiacola; Mey, 1990
- Species: †R. extinctus

Binomial name
- †Rallicola extinctus (Mey, 1990)

Synonyms
- Huiacola extinctus Mey, 1990

= Rallicola extinctus =

Extinct species of louse

Rallicola extinctus is an extinct species of phtilopterid louse. The parasite was only known to live on the now extinct huia and is thought to have become extinct with its host. Like its host, it was endemic to New Zealand's North Island.

== Taxonomy ==
It was initially placed in its own separate genus, Huiacola, which means "huia inhabitant", but this is now considered a subgenus.
