= Coextinction =

Loss of one species endangers other species

Coextinction and cothreatened refer to the phenomenon of the loss or decline of a host species resulting in the loss or endangerment of another species that depends on it, potentially leading to cascading effects across trophic levels. The term was originated by the authors Stork and Lyal (1993) and was originally used to explain the extinction of parasitic insects following the loss of their specific hosts. The term is now used to describe the loss of any interacting species, including competition with their counterpart, and specialist herbivores with their food source. Coextinction is especially common when a keystone species goes extinct.

== Causes ==
The most frequently cited example is that of the extinct passenger pigeon and its parasitic bird lice Columbicola extinctus and Campanulotes defectus. Recently, C. extinctus was rediscovered on the band-tailed pigeon, and C. defectus was found to be a likely case of misidentification of the existing Campanulotes flavus. However, even though the passenger pigeon louse was rediscovered, coextinctions of other parasites, even on the passenger pigeon, may have occurred. Several louse species, such as Rallicola extinctus, a huia parasite, probably became extinct together with their hosts.

Recent studies have suggested that up to 50% of species may go extinct in the next 50 years. This is in part due to coextinction; for example the loss of tropical butterfly species from Singapore is attributed to the loss of their specific larval host plants. To predict how possible future cases of coextinction might play out, one set of researchers made models to predict probabilistic relationships between affiliate and host extinctions across co-evolved inter-specific systems. The subjects are pollinating Ficus wasps and Ficus; primates and their parasites; (Pneumocystis Fungi, Nematode, and Lice) and their hosts; parasitic mites and lice and their avian hosts; butterflies and their larval host plants; and ant butterflies and their host ants. For all but the most host-specific affiliate groups (e.g., primate Pneumocystis fungi and primates), affiliate extinction levels may be modest at low levels of host extinction but can be expected to rise quickly as host extinctions increase to levels predicted in the near future. This curvilinear relationship between host and affiliate extinction levels may also explain, in part, why so few coextinction events have been documented to date.

Investigations have been carried out into coextinction risk among the rich Psyllid fauna Hemiptera – Psylloidea inhabiting acacias (Fabaceae-Mimosoideae: Acacia) in central eastern New South Wales, Australia. The results, suggest that A. ausfeldii hosts one specialist psyllid species, Acizzia, and that A. gordonii hosts one specialist psyllid, Acizzia. Both psyllid species may be threatened at the same level of their host species with coextinction.

Interaction patterns can be used to anticipate the consequences of phylogenetic effects. By using a system of methodical observations, scientists can use the phylogenetic relationships of species to predict the number of interactions they exhibit in more than one-third of the networks, and the identity of the species with which they interact in about half of the networks. Consequentially, simulated extinction events tend to trigger coextinction cascades of related species. This results in a non-random pruning of the evolutionary tree.

In a 2004 paper in Science, ecologist Lian Pin Koh and colleagues discuss coextinction, stating

"Species coextinction is a manifestation of the interconnectedness of organisms in complex ecosystems. The loss of species through coextinction represents the loss of irreplaceable evolutionary and coevolutionary history. In view of the global extinction crisis, it is imperative that coextinction be the focus of future research to understand the intricate processes of species extinctions. While coextinction may not be the most important cause of species extinctions, it is certainly an insidious one." (Koh et al. 2004)

Koh et al. also define coendangered as taxa "likely to go extinct if their currently endangered hosts [...] become extinct."

One example is the extinction of many species of the genus Hibiscadelphus, as a consequence of the disappearance of several of the Hawaiian honeycreepers, its pollinators. There are also several instances of predators and scavengers dying out or becoming rarer following the disappearance of species which represented their source of food: for example, the coextinction of the Haast's eagle with the moa, or the near-extinction of the California condor after the extinctions of its primary food, the dead carcasses of North American Pleistocene megafauna; in the latter, the condor survived by possibly relying on beached marine mammals.

Coextinction may also occur on a local level: for example, the decline in the red ant Myrmica sabuleti in southern England, caused by habitat loss, resulted in the extirpation of the large blue butterfly (which is dependent on the ant as a host for its larvae) from Great Britain. In this case the ant avoided extirpation, and the butterfly has since been reintroduced to the island.

Another example of a species that could currently be experiencing coextinction is the rhinoceros stomach bot fly (Gyrostigma rhinocerontis) and its host species the endangered black rhinoceros and white rhinoceros (Diceros bicornis and Ceratotherium simum). The fly's larvae mature in a rhinoceros's stomach lining, having entered the body via the digestive tract, and so are dependent on rhinoceros species to reproduce.

== Consequences ==
Coextinction can mean loss of biodiversity and diversification. Coextinction can also result in loss of evolutionary history.

Coextinction can extend beyond biodiversity and has direct and indirect consequences on the communities of lost species. One main consequence of coextinction that goes beyond biodiversity is mutualism, by loss of food production with a decline in threatened pollinators. Losses of parasites can have negative impacts on humans or the species.

A consequence of removing specialist parasites from rare hosts is the problem of where the parasites will go once their host is extinct. If the parasites are dependent on only those species than there are parasite species that are at risk of extinction through co-endangerment.

A study conducted in New Caledonia has shown that extinction of a coral reef-associated fish species of average size would eventually result in the co-extinction of at least ten species of parasites.

== Risks ==
The host specificity and life cycle is a major factor in the risk of coextinction. Species of mutualists, parasites, and many free-living insects that have staged life cycles are more likely to be a victim of coextinction. This is due to the fact that these organisms may depend on multiple hosts throughout their lives in comparison to simple life cycled organisms. Also, if organisms are evolutionary flexible, then these organisms may escape extinction.

The area with that has the greatest effect of coextinction is the tropics. There is a continued disappearance in the habitat, human intervention, and a great loss in vital ecosystem services. This is threatening because the tropics contain 2/3 of the all known species but they aren't in a situation where they can be fully taken care of. Along with forest loss other risk factors include: coastal development, overexploitation of wildlife, and habitat conversion, that also affect human well-being.

In an effort to find a stop to coextinction, researchers have found that the first step would be to conserve the host species in which other species are dependent on. These hosts serve as major components for their habitat and need them to survive. In deciding what host to protect, it is important to choose one that can benefit an array of other dependent species.

== See also ==
- Dodo and tambalacoque, for a supposed case of near-coextinction that turned out to be much more complex
