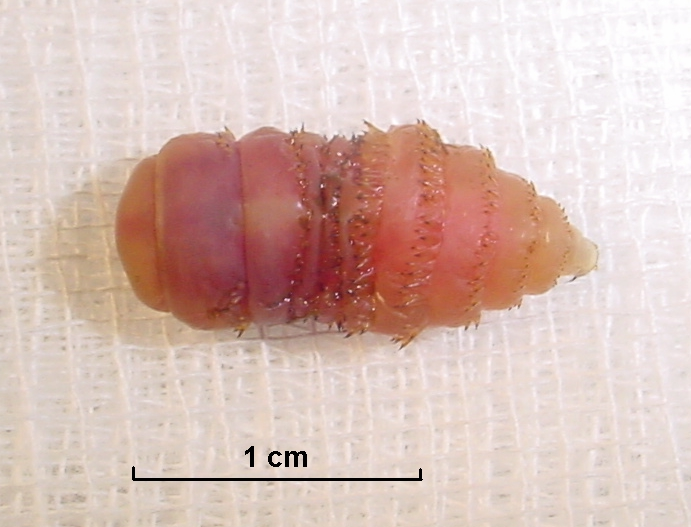

Scientific classification
- Domain: Eukaryota
- Kingdom: Animalia
- Phylum: Arthropoda
- Class: Insecta
- Order: Diptera
- Family: Oestridae
- Subfamily: Gasterophilinae

Genera
- Cobboldia Brauer, 1887; Gasterophilus Leach, 1817; Gyrostigma Hope, 1840; Neocuterebra; Ruttenia

= Gasterophilinae =

Subfamily of flies

The Gasterophilinae are a subfamily of Oestridae which includes large, parasitic flies; this group has historically been treated as a family, but all recent classifications place them firmly within the Oestridae. Many members of this subfamily spend part of their larval stages in the digestive tracts of herbivores. The best known genus is Gasterophilus, which attacks horses, deer, and similar animals. The genus Cobboldia breeds in elephants. The genus Gyrostigma breeds in rhinoceroses.
