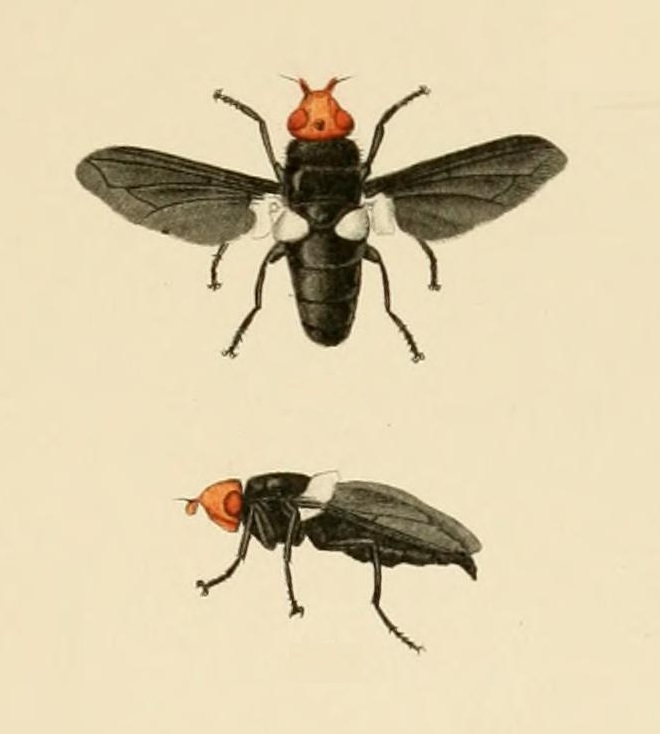
- Cobboldia elephantis

Scientific classification
- Domain: Eukaryota
- Kingdom: Animalia
- Phylum: Arthropoda
- Class: Insecta
- Order: Diptera
- Family: Oestridae
- Subfamily: Gasterophilinae
- Genus: Cobboldia; Brauer, 1887

Species
- C. chrysidiformis Rodhain & Bequaert, 1915; C. elephantis (Cobbold, 1882); C. roverei Gedoelst, 1915; †C. russanovi Grunin, 1973

= Cobboldia =

Genus of parasitic flies

Cobboldia is a genus of parasitic flies in the family Oestridae. Adult flies of Cobboldia elephantis lay their eggs near the mouth or base of the tusks of Asian elephant while the related Cobboldia loxodontis (=Platycobboldia loxodontis) parasitizes African elephants. The larvae hatch and develop in the mouth cavity and later move to the stomach. On maturing, the third instar larvae exit from the mouth and drop to the ground to pupate.

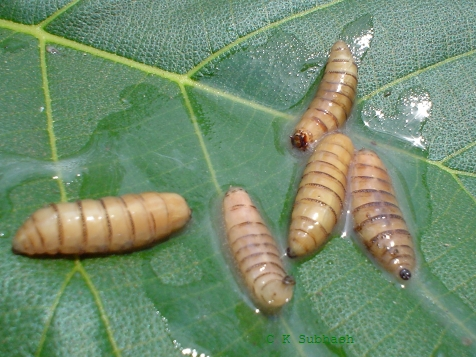
Larvae of Cobboldia from autopsy of an Asian elephant stomach

A fossil species Cobboldia russanovi is known from the frozen remains of mammoths. Cobboldia roverei Gedoelst, 1915 (=Rodhainommia roverei, the green elephant stomach bot fly) has been noted from the African Forest Elephant.

The genus is named after Thomas Spencer Cobbold (1828–1886) who described the first species as Gastrophilus elephantis.
