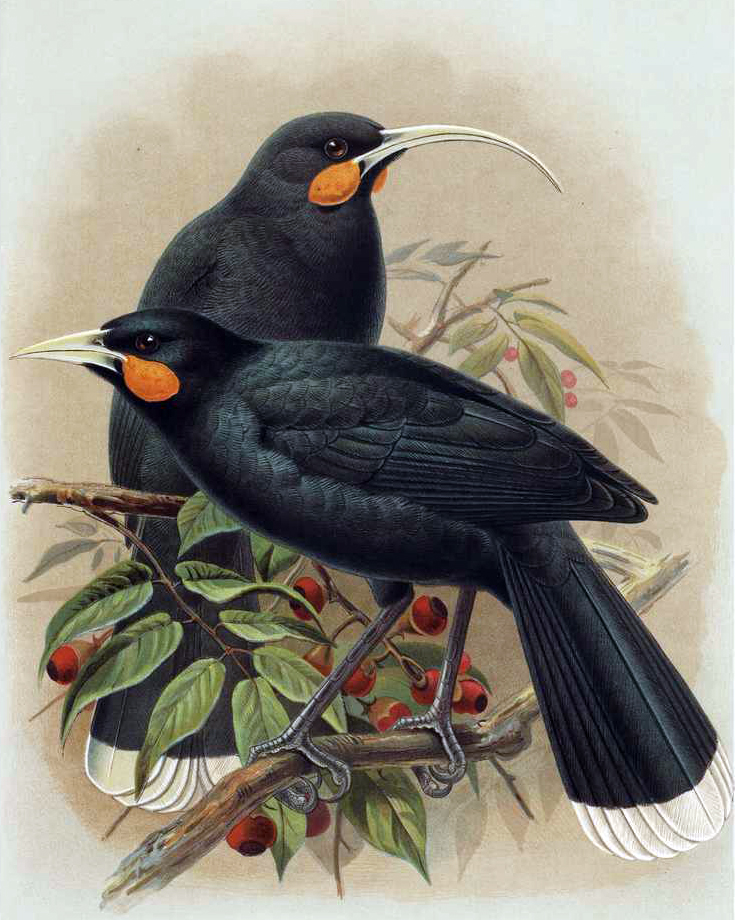
- A pair of huia (male in front of female) from W. L. Buller's A History of the Birds of New Zealand (1888)

Conservation status
- Extinct (1907) (IUCN 3.1)

Scientific classification
- Kingdom: Animalia
- Phylum: Chordata
- Class: Aves
- Order: Passeriformes
- Family: Callaeidae
- Genus: †Heteralocha; Cabanis, 1851
- Species: †H. acutirostris

Binomial name
- †Heteralocha acutirostris (Gould, 1837)
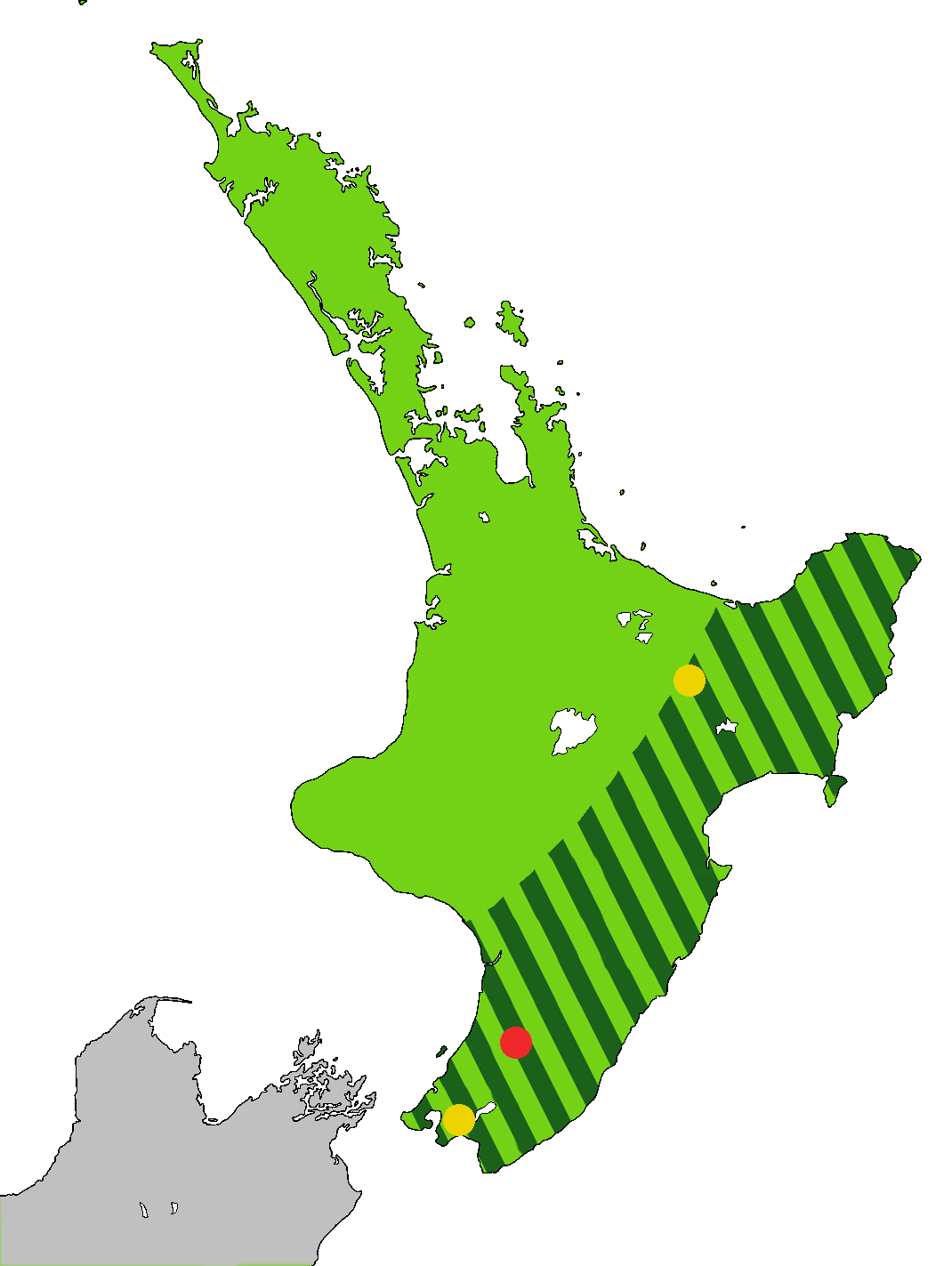
- Light green: original range Dark green stripes: 1840 range Red: site of 1907 last confirmed sighting Yellow: sites of later unconfirmed sightings

Synonyms
- Neomorpha acutirostris (female); Neomorpha crassirostris (male); Heteralocha gouldi

= Huia =

Huia Temporal range: Holocene

Extinct species of bird

The huia (/ˈhuːjə, -iːə/ HOO-yə, -ee-ə; Māori: [ˈhʉia]; Heteralocha acutirostris) is an extinct species of New Zealand wattlebird, endemic to the North Island of New Zealand. The last confirmed sighting of a huia was in 1907, although there was another credible sighting in 1924.

It was already a rare bird before the arrival of Europeans, confined to the Ruahine, Tararua, Rēmutaka and Kaimanawa mountain ranges in the south-east of the North Island. It was remarkable for its pronounced sexual dimorphism in bill shape; the female's beak was long, thin and arched downward, while the male's was short and stout, like that of a crow. Males were 45 cm (18 in) long, while females were larger at 48 cm (19 in). The sexes were otherwise similar, with orange wattles and deep metallic, bluish-black plumage with a greenish iridescence on the upper surface, especially about the head. The tail feathers were unique among New Zealand birds in having a broad white band across the tips.

The birds lived in forests at both montane and lowland elevations – they are thought to have moved seasonally, living at higher elevations in summer and descending to lower elevations in winter. Huia were omnivorous and ate adult insects, grubs and spiders, as well as the fruits of a small number of native plants. Males and females used their beaks to feed in different ways: the male used his bill to chisel away at rotting wood, while the female's longer, more flexible bill was able to probe deeper areas. Even though the huia is frequently mentioned in biology and ornithology textbooks because of this striking dimorphism, not much is known about its biology; it was little studied before going extinct.

The huia is one of New Zealand's best-known extinct birds because of its bill shape and beauty, as well as its special place in Māori culture and oral tradition. The bird was regarded by Māori as tapu (sacred), and the wearing of its skin or feathers was reserved for people of high status.

== Taxonomy and etymology ==
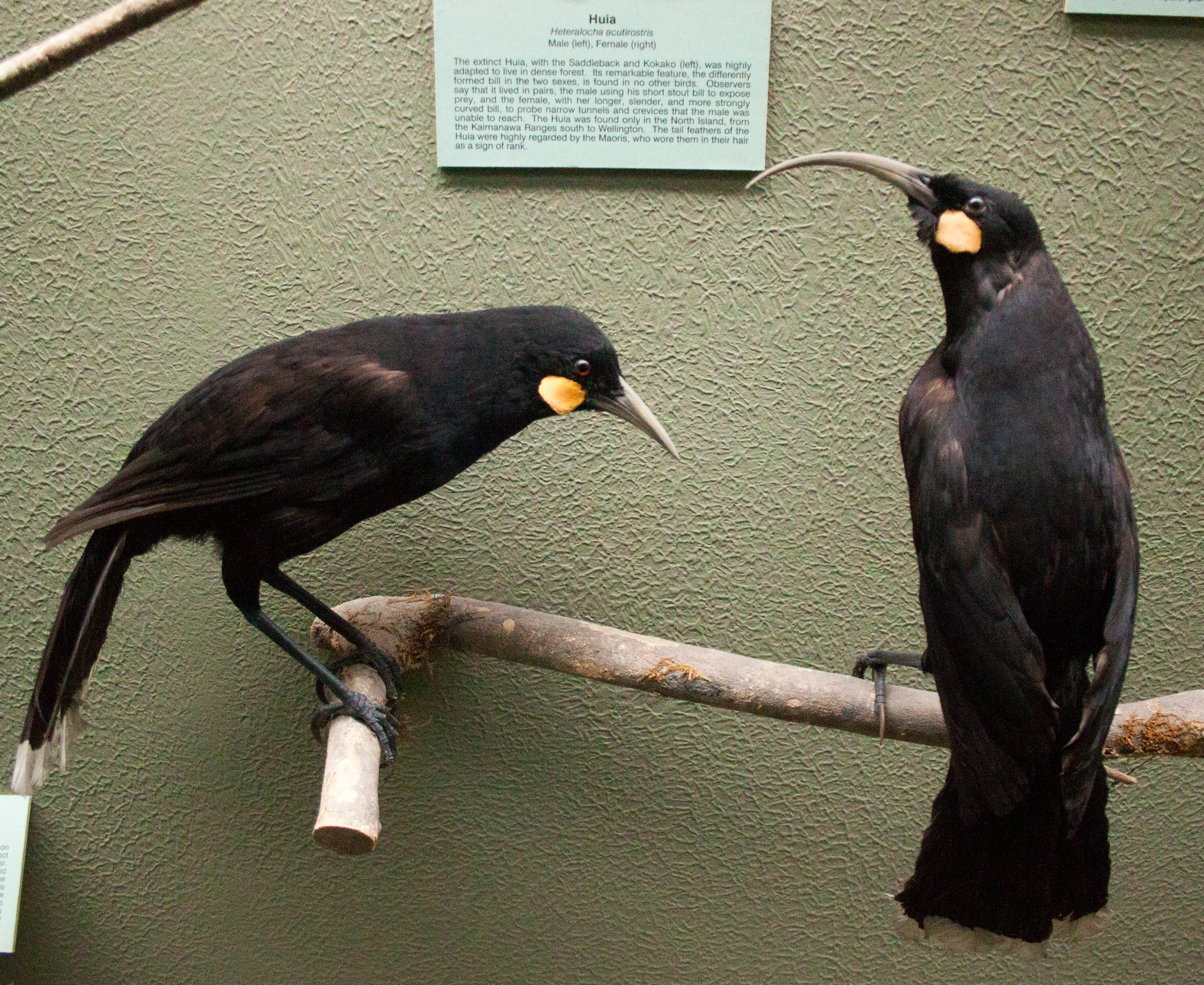
Taxidermy exhibit of a pair at Canterbury Museum

The genus name, Heteralocha, derives from Ancient Greek ἕτερος "different" and ἄλοχος "wife". It refers to the striking difference in bill shape between male and female. The specific name, acutirostris, derives from Latin acutus, meaning "sharp pointed", and rostrum, meaning "beak", and refers to the beak of the female.

John Gould described the huia in 1836 as two species: Neomorpha acutirostris based on a female specimen, and N. crassirostris based on a male specimen—the epithet crassirostris derives from the Latin crassus, meaning "thick" or "heavy", and refers to the male's short bill. In 1840, George Robert Gray proposed the name N. gouldii, arguing that neither of Gould's names was applicable to the species. In 1850, Jean Cabanis replaced the name Neomorpha, which had been previously used for a cuckoo genus, with Heteralocha. In 1888 Sir Walter Buller wrote: "I have deemed it more in accordance with the accepted rules of zoological nomenclature to adopt the first of the two names applied to the species by Mr Gould; and the name Neomorpha having been previously used in ornithology, it becomes necessary to adopt that of Heteralocha, proposed by Dr Cabanis for this form."

The huia appears to be a remnant of an early expansion of passerines in the country of New Zealand and is the largest of the three members of the family Callaeidae, the New Zealand wattlebirds; the others are the saddleback and the kōkako. The only close relative to the family is the stitchbird; their taxonomic relationships with other birds remain to be determined. A molecular study of the nuclear RAG-1 and c-mos genes of the three species within the family proved inconclusive, the data providing most support for either a basally diverging kōkako or huia.

== Description ==
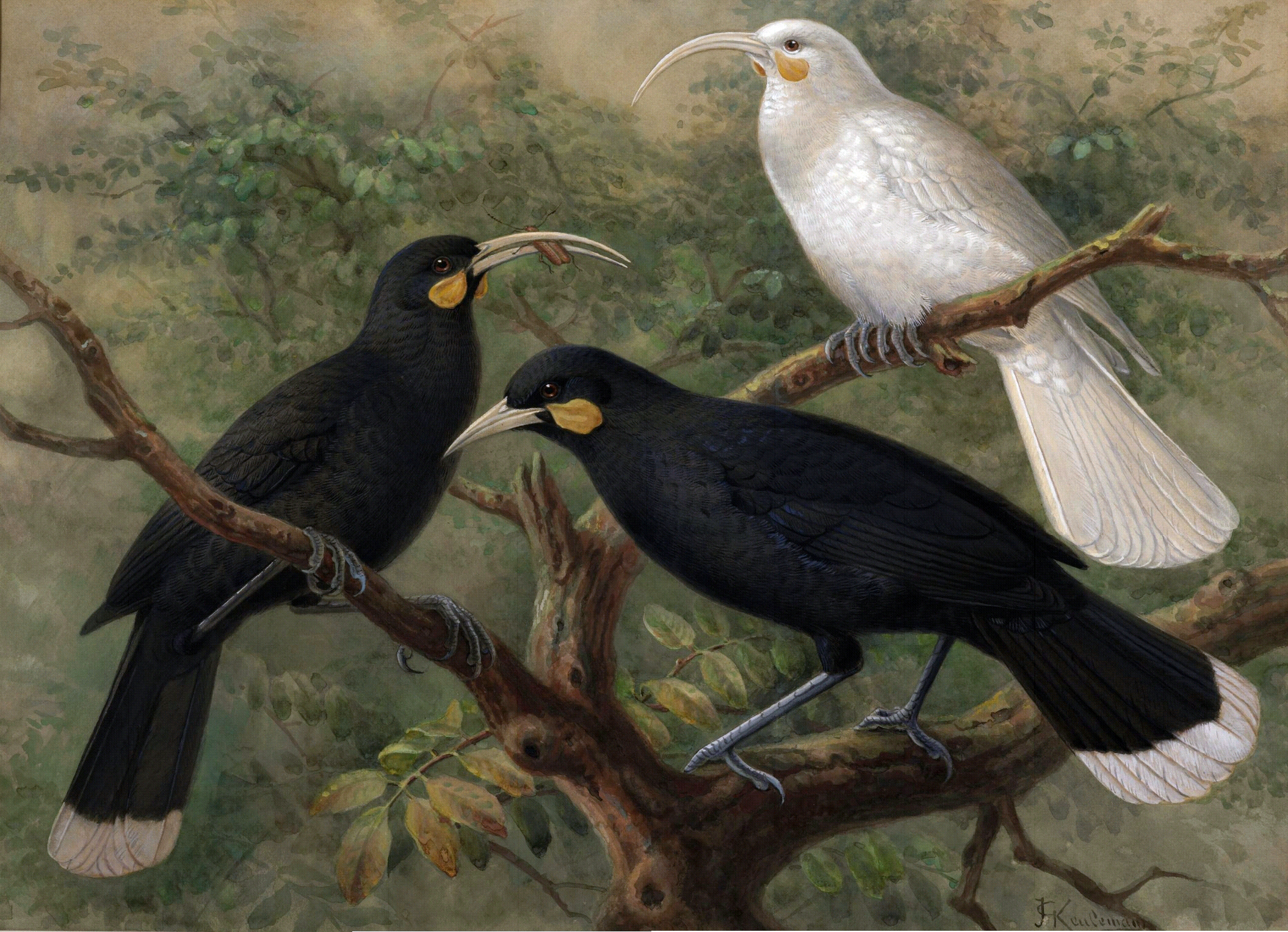
Painting by J. G. Keulemans of a female, a male, and a white female

The huia had black plumage with a green metallic tinge and distinctive rounded bright orange wattles at the gape. In both sexes, the eyes were brown; the beak was ivory white, greyish at the base; the legs and feet were long and bluish grey while the claws were light brown. Huia had twelve long glossy black tail feathers, each tipped for 2.5–3 cm (0.98–1.18 in) with a broad band of white. Immature huia had small pale wattles, duller plumage flecked with brown, and a reddish-buff tinge to the white tips of the tail feathers. The beak of the young female was only slightly curved. Māori referred to certain huia as huia-ariki, "chiefly huia". The huia-ariki had brownish plumage streaked with grey, and the feathers on the neck and head were darker. This variant may have been a partial albino, or perhaps such birds were simply of great age. Several true albino huia were recorded. A white specimen painted by John Gerrard Keulemans around 1900 may have been the result of progressive greying or leucism, rather than albinism; the current whereabouts of this specimen are unknown.

Although sexual dimorphism in bill shape is found in other birds, such as the riflebirds, sicklebills and other wood-excavating birds including some species of woodpecker, it was most pronounced in the huia. The beak of the male was short at approximately 60 mm (2.4 in) and slightly arched downwards and robust, very similar to that of the closely related saddleback, while the female's beak was finer, longer at around 104 mm (4.1 in), and decurved (curved downward) like that of a hummingbird or honeyeater. The difference was not only in the bone; the rhamphotheca grew way past the end of the bony maxilla and mandible to produce a pliable implement able to deeply penetrate holes made by wood-boring beetle larvae. The skulls and mandibles of the huia and saddleback are very similar, the latter essentially miniatures of the former.

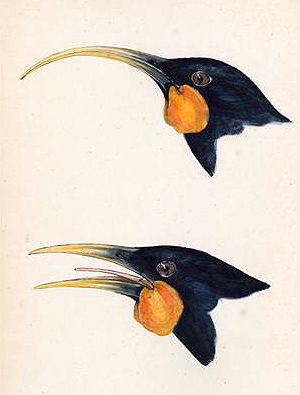
An 1830s painting by John Gould illustrating the remarkable sexual dimorphism of the huia's beak. The female's beak (top) was finer, longer, and more curved than the male's (below)

There are two possible explanations for the evolution of this sexual difference in bill shape. The most widely supported is that it allowed birds of different sexes to utilise different food sources. This divergence may have arisen because of a lack of competitors in these foraging niches in the North Island forest ecosystems. The other idea is that the ivory-coloured bill, which contrasted sharply with the bird's black plumage, may have been used to attract a mate. In animals that use sexually dimorphic physical traits to attract a mate, the dimorphic feature is often brightly coloured or contrasts with the rest of the body, as with the huia. It has been suggested that as the female was the main provider of food for the chicks by regurgitation, this sex evolved the longer bill to obtain the protein-rich invertebrate diet required for the chicks.

Another, less obvious aspect of the huia's sexual dimorphism was the minor size difference between the sexes. Males were 45 cm (18 in) long, while females were larger at 48 cm (19 in). Additionally, the tail of the male was about 20 cm (7.9 in) in length and the wingspan was between 21 and 22 cm (8.3 and 8.7 in), while the female's tail was 19.5 to 20 cm (7.7 to 7.9 in) and the female's wingspan was 20 to 20.5 cm (7.9 to 8.1 in).

== Distribution and habitat ==
Subfossil deposits and midden remains reveal that the huia was once widespread in both lowland and montane native forest throughout the North Island, extending from the northernmost tip at Cape Reinga to Wellington and the Aorangi Range in the far south. Only a few huia are known from the extensive pitfall deposits in the karst of the Waitomo Caves area and they are also rare or absent in fossil deposits in the central North Island and Hawke's Bay; it seems to have preferred habitats that are not well sampled by the deposits known at present. The huia vanished from the northern and western North Island following Māori settlement in the 14th century, due to over-hunting, forest clearance, and introduced kiore preying on nests. By the time of European settlement in the 1840s it was only found south of a line from the Raukūmara Range in the east, across the Kaimanawa Range, to the Turakina River in the Rangitikei in the west. In the south, its range extended to the Wairarapa and the Remutaka Range east of Wellington. Reports collected by Walter Buller and a single waiata (Māori song) suggest that the huia was once also found in the Marlborough and Nelson districts of the South Island; however, it has never been identified in the rich fossil deposits south of Cook Strait, and there is no other evidence of the species' presence.

The huia inhabited both of the two principal forest types in New Zealand. They were primarily found in broadleaf-podocarp forests where there was a dense understorey, but occasionally also in southern beech (Nothofagus) forest. The species was observed in native vegetation including mataī (Prumnopitys taxifolia), rimu (Dacrydium cupressinum), kahikatea (Dacrycarpus dacrydioides), northern rātā (Metrosideros robusta), maire (Notelaea), hīnau (Elaeocarpus dentatus), tōtara (Podocarpus totara), rewarewa (Knightia excelsa), māhoe (Melicytus ramiflorus), and taraire (Beilschmiedia tarairi), and at sea level in karaka (Corynocarpus laevigatus) trees at Cape Turakirae. It was never seen in burnt forest or land cleared for farming.

== Ecology and behaviour ==
=== Movements ===
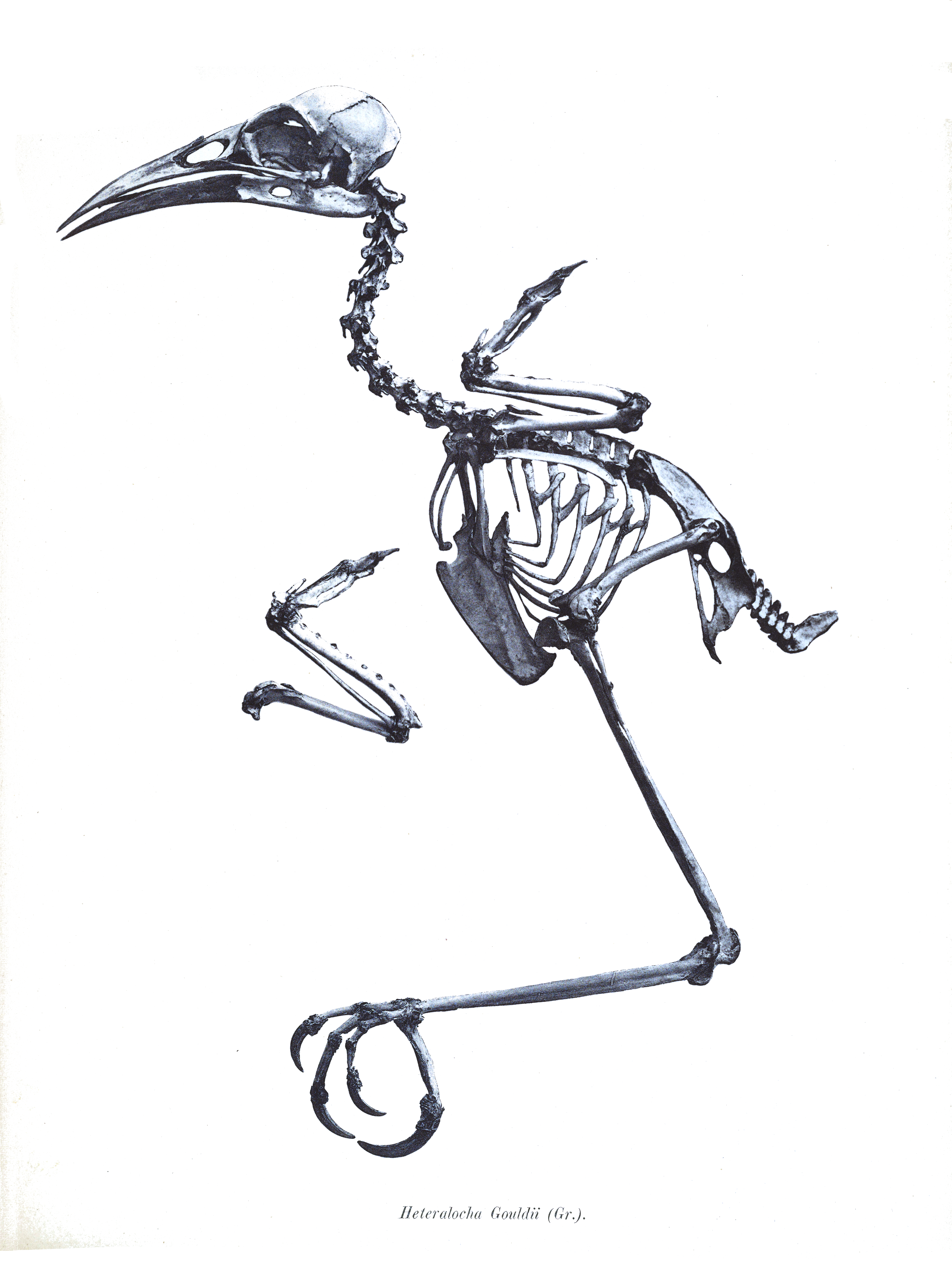
Skeleton showing long legs suitable for hopping

The huia's movements are little known, but it was most likely sedentary. The huia is thought to have undertaken seasonal movements, living in montane forests in the summer and moving down into lowland forests in the winter to avoid the harsher weather and cold temperatures of higher altitudes. Like the surviving New Zealand wattlebirds, the saddleback and the kōkako, the huia was a weak flier and could only fly for short distances, and seldom above tree height. More often it would use its powerful legs to propel it in long leaps and bounds through the canopy or across the forest floor, or it would cling vertically to tree trunks with its tail spread for balance.

=== Feeding and ecology ===
The huia, with the previously endangered saddleback, were the two species of classic bark and wood probers in the arboreal insectivore guild in the New Zealand avifauna. Woodpeckers do not occur east of Wallace's line; their ecological niche is filled by other groups of birds that feed on wood-boring beetle larvae, albeit in rotting wood. The woodpecker-like role was taken on by two species in two different families in the New Zealand mixed-podocarp and Nothofagus forests; one was the huia and the other was the kākā.

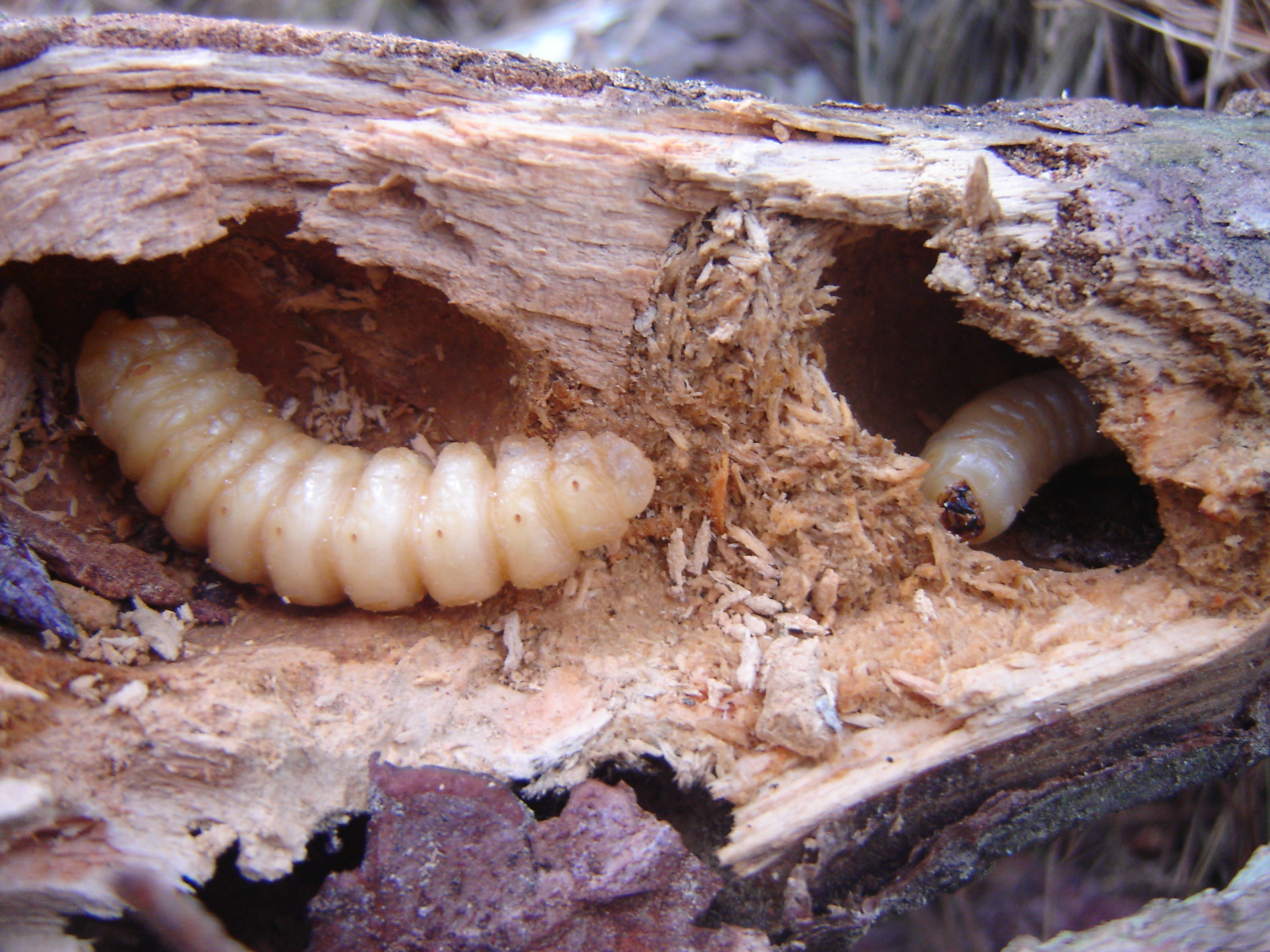
A favourite food of the huia: the larvae of the huhu beetle (Prionoplus reticularis)

The huia foraged mainly on decaying wood. Although it was considered a specialist predator of the larvae of the nocturnal huhu beetle (Prionoplus reticularis), it also ate other insects—including wētā—insect larvae, spiders, and fruit.

Insects and spiders were taken from decaying wood, from under bark, mosses and lichens, and from the ground. Huia foraged either alone, in pairs, or in small flocks of up to five, which were probably family groups. The sexual dimorphism of the bill structure gave rise to feeding strategies that differed radically between the sexes. The male used its adze-like bill to chisel and rip into the outer layers of decaying wood, while the female probed areas inaccessible to the male, such as the burrows of insect larvae in living wood. The male had well-developed cranial musculature allowing rotten wood to be chiselled and pried apart by "gaping" motions. There are corresponding differences in the structure and musculature of the head and neck between males and females. Huia had very well developed depressor jaw muscles, and an occipital crest that provided extra surface for muscle attachment, allowing the jaw to be opened with considerable force. Once the bird had secured a meal, it flew to a perch with the insect in its feet. The huia stripped its meal of any hard parts, then tossed the remainder up, caught, and swallowed it.

Pairs did not cooperate in feeding, at least not in a strict sense. All such reports are based on a misunderstanding of an account by ornithologist Walter Buller of a pair kept in captivity obtaining wood-boring beetle larvae. According to this misunderstanding, which has become part of ecological folklore, the male would tear at the wood and open larval tunnels, thus allowing the female to probe deeply into the tunnels with her long, pliant bill. Rather, the divergent bills represent an extreme example of niche differentiation, reducing intraspecific competition between the sexes. This allowed the species to exploit a wide range of food sources in different microhabitats.

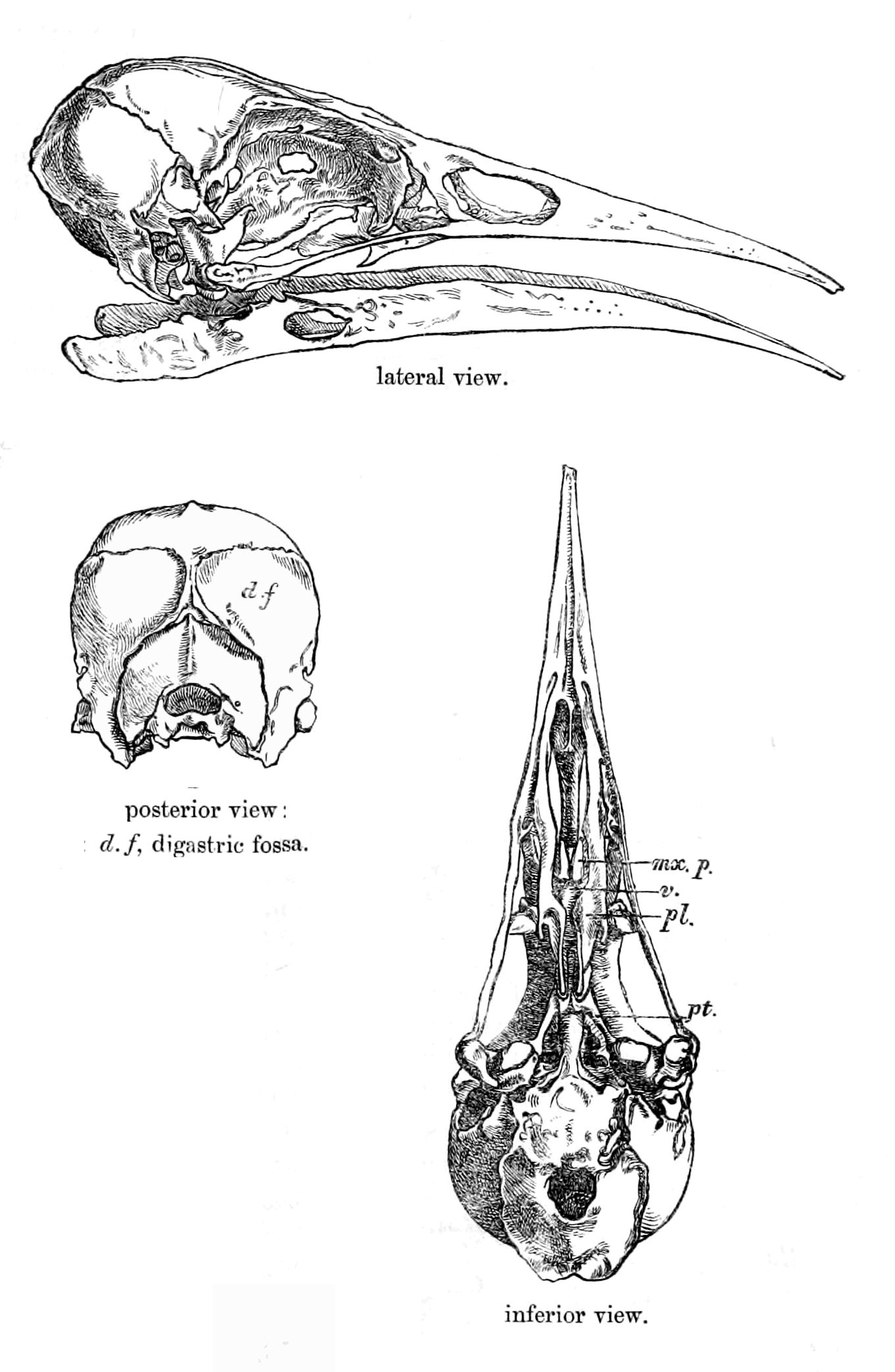
The skull had hollows, digastric fossae, accommodating the strong muscles that open the bill

The New Zealand forest relies heavily on frugivorous birds for seed dispersal: about 70% of the woody plants have fruits that are probably dispersed by birds, which included the huia. The range of fruits eaten by the huia is difficult to establish: hīnau (Elaeocarpus dentatus), pigeonwood (Hedycarya arborea) and various species of Coprosma are recorded by Buller, and they were also recorded as eating the fruits of kahikatea (Dacrycarpus dacrydioides). The extinction of the huia and other frugivorous New Zealand bird species including the moa and piopio, and the diminishing range of many others, including the kiwi, weka, and kōkako, has left few effective seed dispersers in the New Zealand forest. For plants with fruit greater than 1 cm in diameter, kererū are the sole remaining dispersers in the ecosystem, and they are rare or extinct in some areas. This depletion of avifauna in the forest ecosystem may be having major impacts on processes such as forest regeneration and seed dispersal.

=== Voice ===
Like so many other aspects of its biology, the vocalisations of the huia are not well known, and present knowledge is based on very few accounts. The calls were mostly a varied array of whistles, "peculiar and strange", but also "soft, melodious and flute-like". An imitation of the bird's call survives as a recording of 1909 huia search team member Henare Hamana whistling the call. Huia were often silent. When they did vocalise, their calls could carry considerable distances – some were audible from up to 400 m (1,300 ft) away through dense forest. The calls were said to differ between sexes, though there are no details. Calls were given with the bird's head and neck stretched outward and its bill pointing 30 to 45 degrees from the vertical. Most references describe huia calls as heard in the early morning; one records it as the first bird to sing in the dawn chorus, and captive birds were known to "wake the household". Like the whitehead, huia behaved unusually before the onset of wet weather, being "happy and in full song". The bird's name is onomatopoeic: it was named by Māori for its loud distress call, a smooth, unslurred whistle rendered as uia, uia, uia or where are you?. This call was said to be given when the bird was excited or hungry. Chicks had a "plaintive cry, pleasant to the ear", would feebly answer imitations by people, and were very noisy when kept in tents.

=== Commensals and parasites ===
A species of parasitic phtilopterid louse, Rallicola extinctus, was only known to live on the huia, and apparently became extinct with its host. In 2008, a new species of feather mite, Coraciacarus muellermotzfeldi, was described from dried corpses found in the feathers of a huia skin held by a European museum. While the genus Coraciacarus has a wide range of hosts globally, the presence of a representative of the genus on a passerine bird was an "enigmatic phenomenon". The discoverers suggested the mite could have been horizontally transferred from one of the two native, migratory species of cuckoo (Cuculiformes).

=== Social behaviour and reproduction ===
Turnaround video of a mounted pair in Naturalis Biodiversity Center

A quiet, social bird, the huia was monogamous, and pairs probably paired for life. The bird was usually found in breeding pairs, although sometimes groups of four or more were encountered. Walter Buller records that a tame pair would always keep close to each other, constantly uttering a "low affectionate twitter", even when in captivity. There are records of this same pair and a further, wild pair "hopping from branch to branch and fanning their tails, then meeting to caress each other with their bills" and uttering these noises. The male is said to have fed the female in courtship. It is thought that these behaviours may have been a sexual display. The claim that the male fed the female while she was incubating and on the nest "lacks evidence". When the male of this captive pair was accidentally killed, the female "manifesting the utmost distress pined for her mate and died 10 days afterwards". A Māori man in the 19th century recalled: "I was always told by my old people that a pair of huia lived on most affectionate terms ... If the male died first, the female died soon after of grief". The huia had no fear of people; females allowed themselves to be handled on the nest, and birds could easily be captured by hand.

Little is known about the huia's reproduction, as only two eggs and four nests were ever described. The only known huia egg to still exist is in the collection of the Museum of New Zealand Te Papa Tongarewa. The breeding season for mating, building nests, laying eggs and raising young is thought to have been late spring (October–November). It is thought they nested solitarily; pairs are said to have been territorial and the birds would remain on their territories for life. Huia appear to have raised just one brood per season; the number of eggs in a clutch is variously described as being 3–5, 4, 2–4 and 1–4. These eggs were greyish with purple and brown speckles, and measured 45 by 30 mm (1.8 by 1.2 in). Incubation was mostly by the female, though there is evidence that the male also had a small role, as rubbed-bare brooding patches that were smaller than those of females were discovered on some males in November. The incubation period is unknown. Eggshells were apparently removed from the nest by adults. The brood size was usually one or two, though there were occasional records of up to three chicks in a single nest. Nests were constructed in varying places: in dead trees, the crooks of large branches, tree hollows, on branches, or "on or near the ground", and some nests were covered with hanging vegetation or vines. The nest itself was a large saucer-shaped structure, up to 350 mm in diameter and 70 mm deep, with thick walls of dry grass, leaves and "withered stems of herbaceous plants". A central small, shallow cup of soft materials such as grass and fine twigs cushioned and insulated the eggs. After hatching, young remained in the family group and were fed by the adults for three months, by which time they appeared adult.

== Relationship with humans ==
=== In culture ===
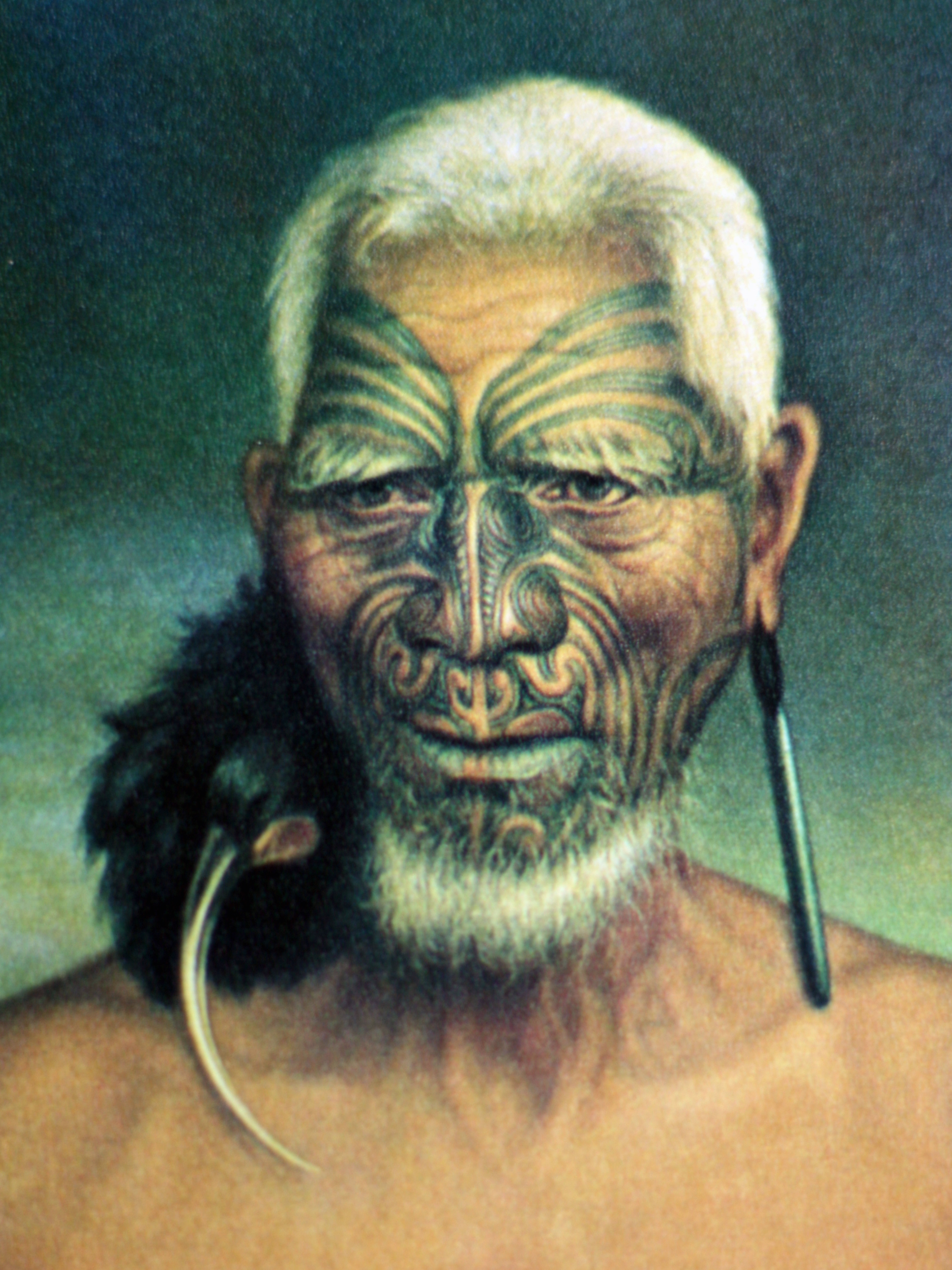
Tukukino, a Māori chief from the Hauraki district, wearing a pōhoi ornament made from a huia skin in this 1878 Lindauer portrait.

In Māori culture, the "white heron and the Huia were not normally eaten but were rare birds treasured for their precious plumes, worn by people of high rank". The bold and inquisitive nature of the huia made it particularly easy to capture. Māori attracted the huia by imitating its call and then captured it with a tari (a carved pole with a noose at the end) or snare, or killed it with clubs or long spears. Often they exploited the strong pair bond by capturing one of a pair, which would then call out, attracting its mate, which could be easily captured. Opinion on the quality of huia meat as food varied wildly; although not usually hunted for this purpose, the huia was considered "good eating" in pies or curried stew by some, but a "tough morsel" and "unfit to eat" by others.

Although the huia's range was restricted to the southern North Island, its tail feathers were valued highly and were exchanged among tribes for other valuable goods such as pounamu and shark teeth, or given as tokens of friendship and respect. Through this trade, the feathers reached the far north and the far south of New Zealand. They were stored in intricately carved boxes called waka huia, which were hung from the ceilings of chiefs' houses. Huia feathers were worn at funerals and used to decorate the heads of the deceased. The marereko, described by Edward Robert Tregear as an "ancient war-plume", consisted of twelve huia feathers. The highly valued pōhoi was an ornament made from the skin of the huia: the bird was skinned with the beak, skull and wattles attached and the legs and wings removed, carefully dried, and the resulting ornament worn from the neck or ears. Dried huia heads were also worn as pendants called ngutu huia. A captured huia would be kept in a small cage so that its tail feathers could be plucked as they grew to full size.

The bird was also kept by Māori as a pet, and like the tūī, it could be trained to say a few words. There is also a record of a tame huia kept by European settlers in a small village in the Forty-Mile Bush in the 19th century.

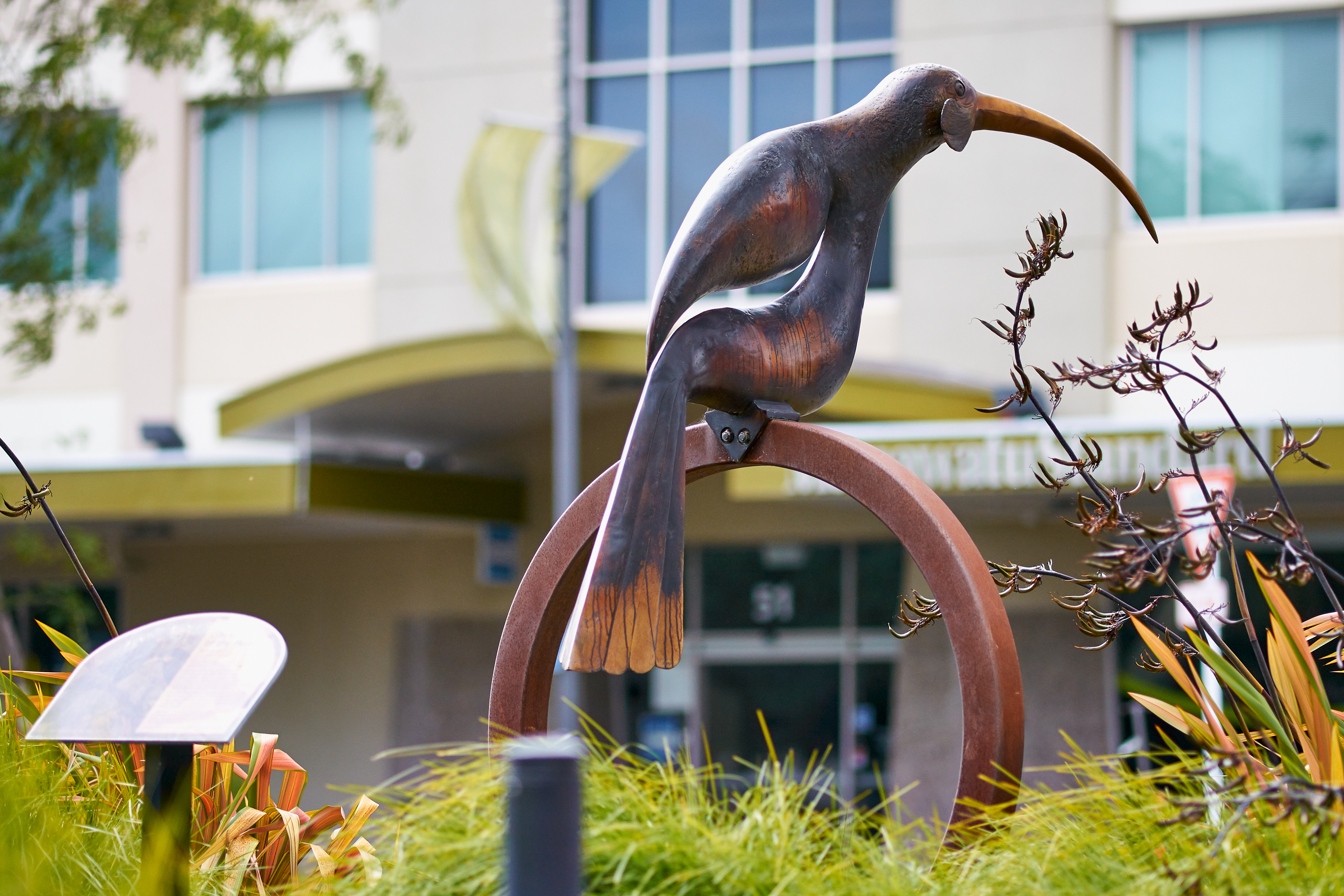
"Ghost of the Huia", sculpture in Palmerston North by Paul Dibble

New Zealand has released several postage stamps portraying the huia. The New Zealand sixpence coin, minted between 1933 and 1966, featured a female huia on the reverse.

The degree to which the huia was known and admired in New Zealand is reflected in the large number of suburban and geographical features which are named after the species. There are several roads and streets named after the huia in the North Island, with several in Wellington (including Huia Road in Days Bay – not far from where one of the last sightings of this species occurred in the early 1920s in the forests of East Harbour Regional Park) and also in Auckland, where there is even a Huia township in West Auckland (although the township is named after a Waikato Tainui chief of the same name). A river on the west coast of the South Island and the Huiarau Ranges in the central North Island are also named after the bird. The species was once found living in great abundance in the forests of these mountains: Huiarau means "a hundred huia". Businesses include the public swimming pool in Lower Hutt, a Marlborough winery, and Huia Publishers, which specialises in Māori writing and perspectives. The name was first given to a child in the late 19th century, to the son of members of a lower North Island iwi concerned about the bird's rapid decline, and although uncommon, it is still used today in New Zealand as a name for girls and more rarely for boys (e.g. Huia Edmonds), of both European and Māori descent. Huia also featured extensively in contemporary art and handcrafts, commonly seen in gift shops the around the country. In 2020 Prime Minister Jacinda Ardern wore upcycled huia feather earrings during a public COVID-19 announcement causing demand to soar.

Tail feathers of the extinct huia are very rare and they have become a collector's item. In May 2024 a single huia feather sold at auction in Auckland for NZ$46,521.50, making it the most expensive feather ever sold in the world. The previous record was another huia feather sold in 2010.

In the 2016 New Zealand film Hunt for the Wilderpeople two of the characters encounter a huia, and eventually set out to obtain proof of their sighting. Reviewers asserted that in the film the huia is significant as a "uniquely indigenous" symbol that "represents harmony with nature and the wild."

=== Extinction ===
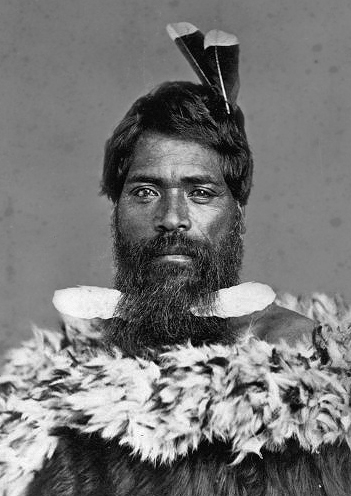
A Māori man from the Hauraki district wearing huia tail feathers in his hair (photo before 1886).

The huia was found throughout the North Island before humans arrived in New Zealand. Māori are estimated to have arrived around 750 years ago, and by the arrival of European settlers in the 1840s, habitat destruction, hunting, and introduced rats had reduced the bird's range to the southern North Island. However, Māori hunting pressures on the huia were limited to some extent by traditional protocols. The hunting season was from May to July when the bird's plumage was in prime condition, while a rāhui (hunting ban) was enforced in spring and summer. After European settlement the huia's numbers began to decline more quickly, due mainly to two well-documented factors: widespread deforestation and over-hunting.

Like the extinctions of other New Zealand birds such as the piopio in the 19th century, the decline of the huia was poorly studied. Massive deforestation occurred in the North Island at this time, particularly in the lowlands of southern Hawkes Bay, the Manawatū and the Wairarapa, as land was cleared by European settlers for agriculture. The huia was particularly vulnerable to this as it could only live in old-growth forest where there were abundant rotting trees filled with wood-boring insect larvae. It seems it could not survive in regenerating, secondary forests. Although the mountainous part of its former range was not deforested, the lowland forests of the valleys below were systematically destroyed. The destruction of this part of its habitat would have undoubtedly had a severe impact on huia populations, but its removal would have been particularly dire if they did in fact descend to the lowlands as a winter refuge to escape snow at higher altitudes as some researchers including Oliver have surmised.

It appears that predation by invasive mammalian species including ship rats, cats, and mustelids was an additional factor in the decline in huia numbers – the introduction of these animals by New Zealand acclimatisation societies peaked in the 1880s and coincided with a particularly sharp decline in huia populations. Because it spent a lot of time on the ground, the huia would have been particularly vulnerable to mammalian predators. Another hypothetical cause of extinction is exotic parasites and disease introduced from Asia with the common myna.

Habitat destruction and the predations of introduced species were problems faced by all New Zealand birds, but in addition the huia faced massive pressure from hunting. Due to its pronounced sexual dimorphism and its beauty, huia were sought after as mounted specimens by wealthy collectors in Europe and by museums all over the world. These individuals and institutions were willing to pay large sums of money for good specimens, and the overseas demand created a strong financial incentive for hunters in New Zealand. This hunting was initially by naturalists. Austrian taxidermist Andreas Reischek took 212 pairs as specimens for the Natural History museum in Vienna over a period of 10 years, while New Zealand ornithologist Walter Buller collected 18 on just one of several expeditions to the Remutaka Ranges in 1883. Others keen to profit soon joined in. Buller records that also in 1883, a party of 11 Māori obtained 646 huia skins from the forest between the Manawatū Gorge and Ākitio. Several thousand huia were exported overseas as part of this trade. Infrastructure development within lowland forest did not help the situation: hundreds of huia were shot around road and rail construction camps.

Mounted female huia taxidermy specimen; Commercial hunting may have contributed to the extinction of the huia

While we were looking at and admiring this little picture of bird-life, a pair of Huia, without uttering a sound, appeared in a tree overhead, and as they were caressing each other with their beautiful bills, a charge of No. 6 brought them both to the ground together. The incident was rather touching and I felt almost glad that the shot was not mine, although by no means loth to appropriate 2 fine specimens.

— Sir Walter Buller, New Zealand's well-known 19th-century ornithologist, encapsulating what one source describes as the "ambiguous" 19th-century attitudes towards the declining New Zealand avifauna.

The rampant and unsustainable hunting was not just financially motivated: it also had a more philosophical, fatalistic aspect. The conventional wisdom among New Zealand Europeans in the 19th century was that things colonial, whether they were plants, animals or people, were inferior to things European. It was widely assumed that the plants and animals of New Zealand's forest ecosystems would be quickly replaced by more vigorous and competitive European species. This assumption of inevitable doom led to a conclusion that the conservation of native biota was pointless and futile; Victorian collectors instead focused their efforts on acquiring a good range of specimens before the rare species disappeared altogether.

There were some attempts to conserve the huia, but they were few, poorly organised and poorly enforced legally: the conservation movement in New Zealand was still very much in its infancy. There were successive sharp declines in numbers of huia in the 1860s and in the late 1880s, prompting the chiefs of the Manawatū and the Wairarapa to place a rāhui on the Tararua Range. In February 1892, the Wild Birds Protection Act was amended to include the huia, making it illegal to kill the bird, but enforcement was not taken seriously. Island sanctuaries were set up for endangered native birds after this act, but the new bird sanctuaries, including Kapiti Island, Little Barrier Island and Resolution Island, were never stocked with huia. Although attempts were made to capture birds for transfer, no huia were ever transferred. The Kapiti Island attempt is documented as being particularly poorly managed. A live pair destined to be transferred to the island in 1893 was instead appropriated by Buller, who bent the law to take them back to England as a present for Lord Rothschild, along with the last collected live pair of laughing owls.

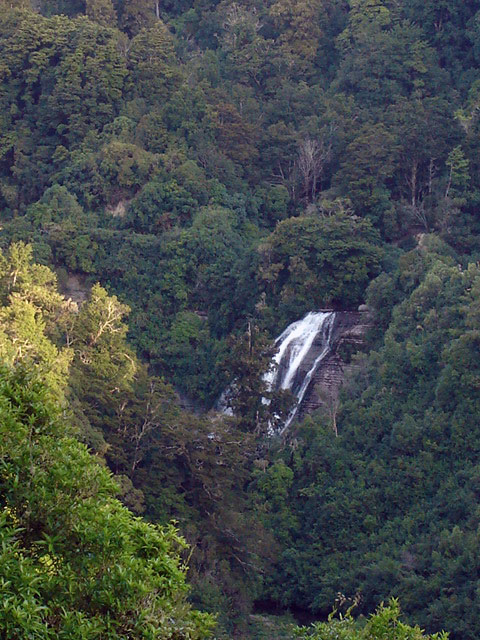
Mōkau Falls in Te Urewera is close to the location of the last credible huia sightings.

The Duke and Duchess of York (later George V and Queen Mary) visited New Zealand in 1901. At an official Māori welcome in Rotorua, a guide took a huia tail feather from her hair and placed it in the band of the Duke's hat as a token of respect. Many people in England and New Zealand wanted to emulate this royal fashion and wear huia feathers in their hats. The price of tail feathers was soon pushed to £1, making each bird worth £12, and some feathers sold for as much as £5. Female huia beaks were also set in gold as jewellery. Shooting season notices ceased listing the huia as a protected species in 1901, and a last-ditch attempt to reinforce government protection failed when the solicitor general ruled that there was no law to protect feathers.

The decline of the huia over the southern half of the North Island occurred at markedly different rates in different locations. Areas where dramatic declines were observed in the 1880s included the Puketoi Range, the Hutt Valley and Tararuas, and the Pahiatua-Dannevirke area. The species was abundant in a few places in the early 20th century between Hawke's Bay and the Wairarapa; a flock of 100–150 birds was reported at the summit of the Akatarawa–Waikanae track in 1905; they were still "fairly plentiful" in the upper reaches of the Rangitīkei River in 1906 – and yet, the last confirmed sighting came just one year later.

The last official, confirmed huia sighting was made on 28 December 1907 when W. W. Smith saw three birds in the forests of the Tararua Ranges. Unconfirmed, "quite credible" reports suggest that extinction for the species came a little later. A man familiar with the species reported seeing three huia in Gollans Valley behind York Bay (between Petone and Eastbourne on Wellington Harbour), an area of mixed beech and podocarp forest well within the bird's former range, on 28 December 1922. Sightings of the huia were also reported there in 1912 and 1913. Despite this, naturalists from the Dominion Museum in Wellington did not investigate the reports. The last credible reports of huia come from the forests of Te Urewera National Park, with one from near Mt Urutawa in 1952 and final sightings near Lake Waikareiti in 1961 and 1963. The possibility of a small huia population still surviving in the Urewera ranges has been proposed by some researchers, but is considered highly unlikely. No recent expeditions have been mounted to find a living specimen.

Students at Hastings Boys' High School organised a conference in 1999 to consider cloning the huia, their school emblem. The tribe Ngāti Huia agreed in principle to support the endeavour, which would be carried out at the University of Otago, and a California-based Internet start-up volunteered $100,000 of funding. However, Sandy Bartle, curator of birds at the Museum of New Zealand Te Papa Tongarewa, said that the complete huia genome could not be derived from museum skins because of the poor state of the DNA, and cloning was therefore unlikely to succeed.
