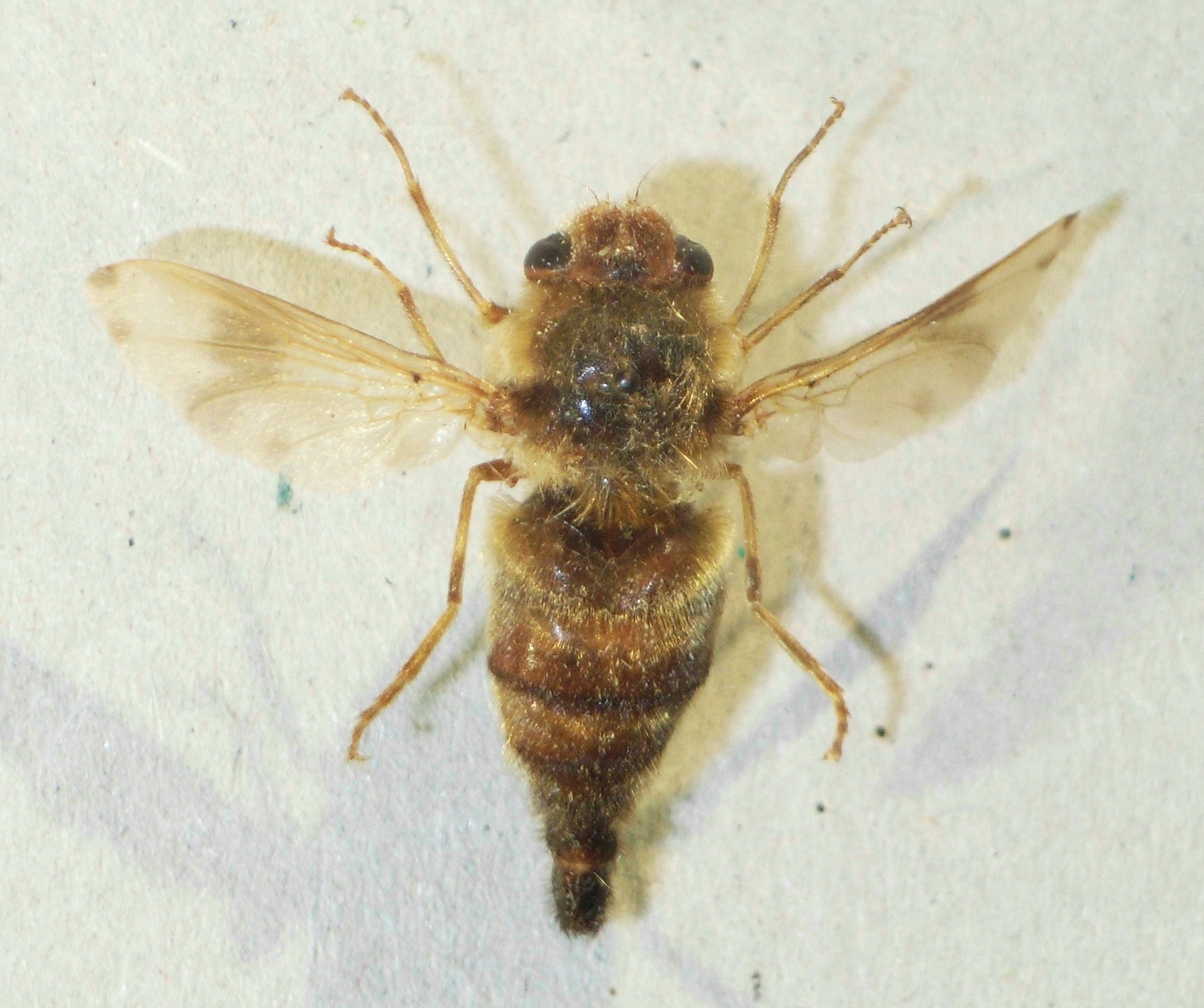
- Adult Gasterophilus intestinalis
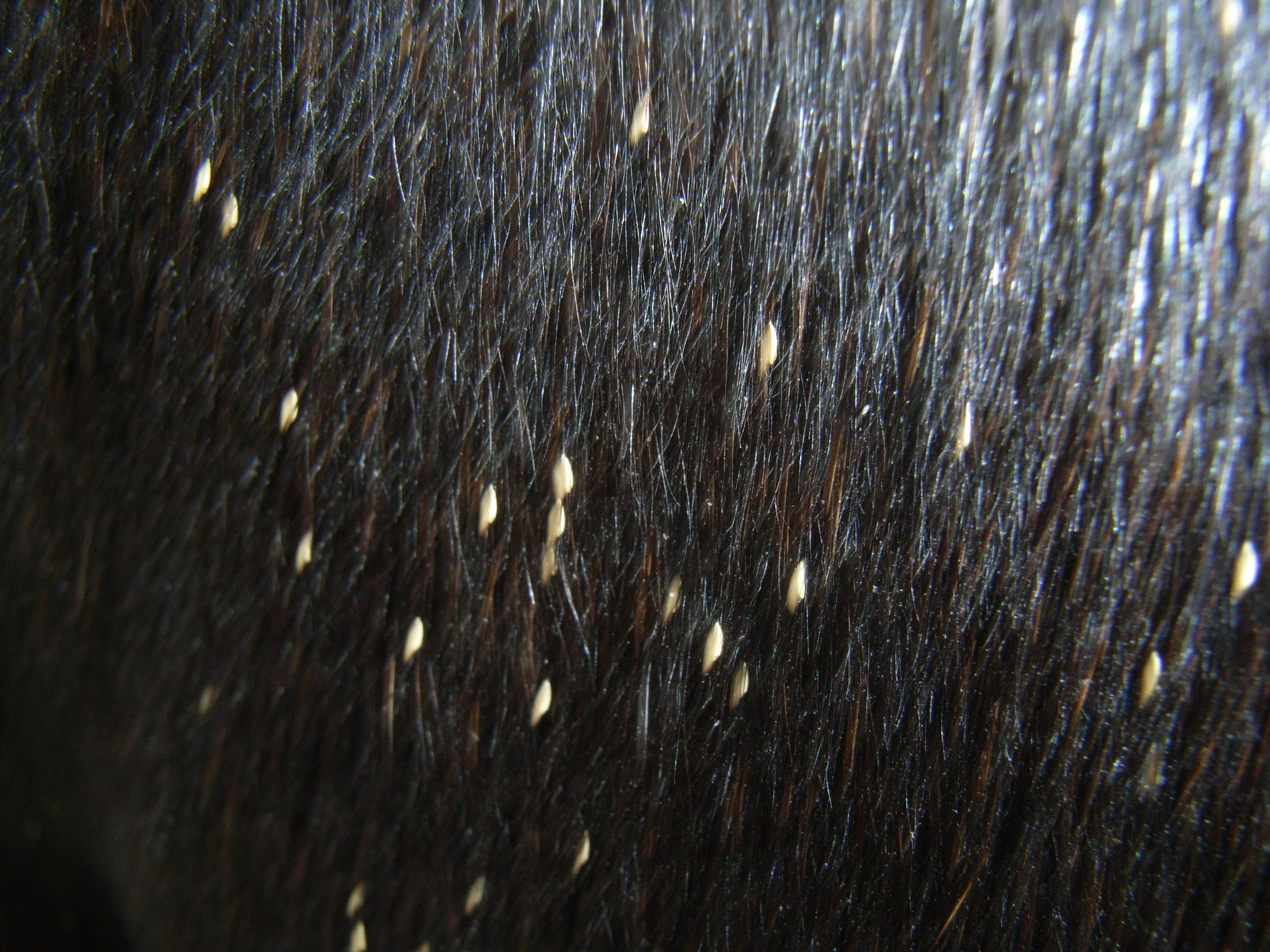
- G. intestinalis eggs on the foreleg of a horse

Scientific classification
- Kingdom: Animalia
- Phylum: Arthropoda
- Clade: Pancrustacea
- Class: Insecta
- Order: Diptera
- Family: Oestridae
- Genus: Gasterophilus
- Species: G. intestinalis

Binomial name
- Gasterophilus intestinalis de Geer 1776

Synonyms
- Oestrus intestinalis de Geer 1776; Oestrus equi Clark 1797

= Gasterophilus intestinalis =

Species of fly

Gasterophilus intestinalis, also known as horse bot fly, is a species of parasitic insect of the family Oestridae, and is found worldwide. The adults, which have a bumblebee-like appearance, are prominently active in the summer. G. intestinalis is primarily a pathogen of horses, mules and donkeys, but is also capable of causing disease in other animals.

== Identification ==
The eggs of G. intestinalis are pale yellow in color, and 1–2 mm (0.039–0.079 in) long. The larvae are yellow or tan. Adults, which are 10–15 mm (0.39–0.59 in) long, look superficially like hairy bumblebees, with a noticeable ovipositor at the end of the abdomen.

== Life cycle ==
The female fly cements individual eggs onto hairs of the forelimbs and shoulders of horses, mules and donkeys. Each female lays up to 1000 eggs. In order to hatch, the eggs must be licked by the host animal. If taken into the host's mouth during grooming, the egg will hatch in the mouth. If not, the first instar larva will migrate to the mouth. The larvae develop in the tissue of the tongue, in tunnels within 1.5 mm (0.059 in) of the surface. Second instar larvae are swallowed and pass into the host's stomach, and attach to the non-glandular region of the stomach. The larvae remain in the stomach for 8–10 months, before maturing into third instar larvae. In the spring, the third stage larvae pass out of the host in the feces. Pupation takes place in the soil for a duration of 3–5 weeks, until the adults emerge. Adults are active for only a few weeks in the summer, and, lacking functional mouthparts, live only for a short time.

== Effects on the host ==
Clinical signs are uncommon in host animals. Large numbers of larvae in the stomach can cause pain in the stomach, and, rarely, extremely large infestations may cause an obstruction at the outflow from the stomach to the duodenum. The larvae are usually found incidentally when the host's stomach is examined by endoscope. Often the only sign of infestation is the finding of larvae in the feces. The main impact on the host is the nuisance of the adults as they repeatedly land on the legs when attempting to lay eggs.

== Treatment and control ==
Substances which are effective against the larvae include the macrocyclic insecticides, ivermectin and moxidectin, and the organophosphate insecticides, metrifonate (also known as trichlorphon) and dichlorvos. The best time to deworm horses against Gasterophilus intestinalis is after the first hard frost. This hard frost will kill the females so no new eggs can be laid on the horse that can be ingested. Meaning that the dewormer is acting on the larva attached to the stomach and will also decrease the amount of larva shed in the feces in the spring.

== Prevention ==
Although deworming is the best treatment and prevention of bot flies, horse owners can take other steps to prevent bot fly egg ingestion. This can be done by manually removing the eggs from the horse's leg using specialized tools, such as bot knives. However, it is important to wash your hands after physically removing the eggs because there is a possibility of the larvae burrowing into the human skin. In addition to removing the eggs manually, there are a few management changes that can be made to decrease the amount of bot flies. Since part of the life-cycle is spent developing in the manure, manure should be removed from horse's pens regularly and composted before place on pasture land. If possible, rotational grazing with different species is beneficial. Lastly, making sure feed and water are free from contamination with manure.
