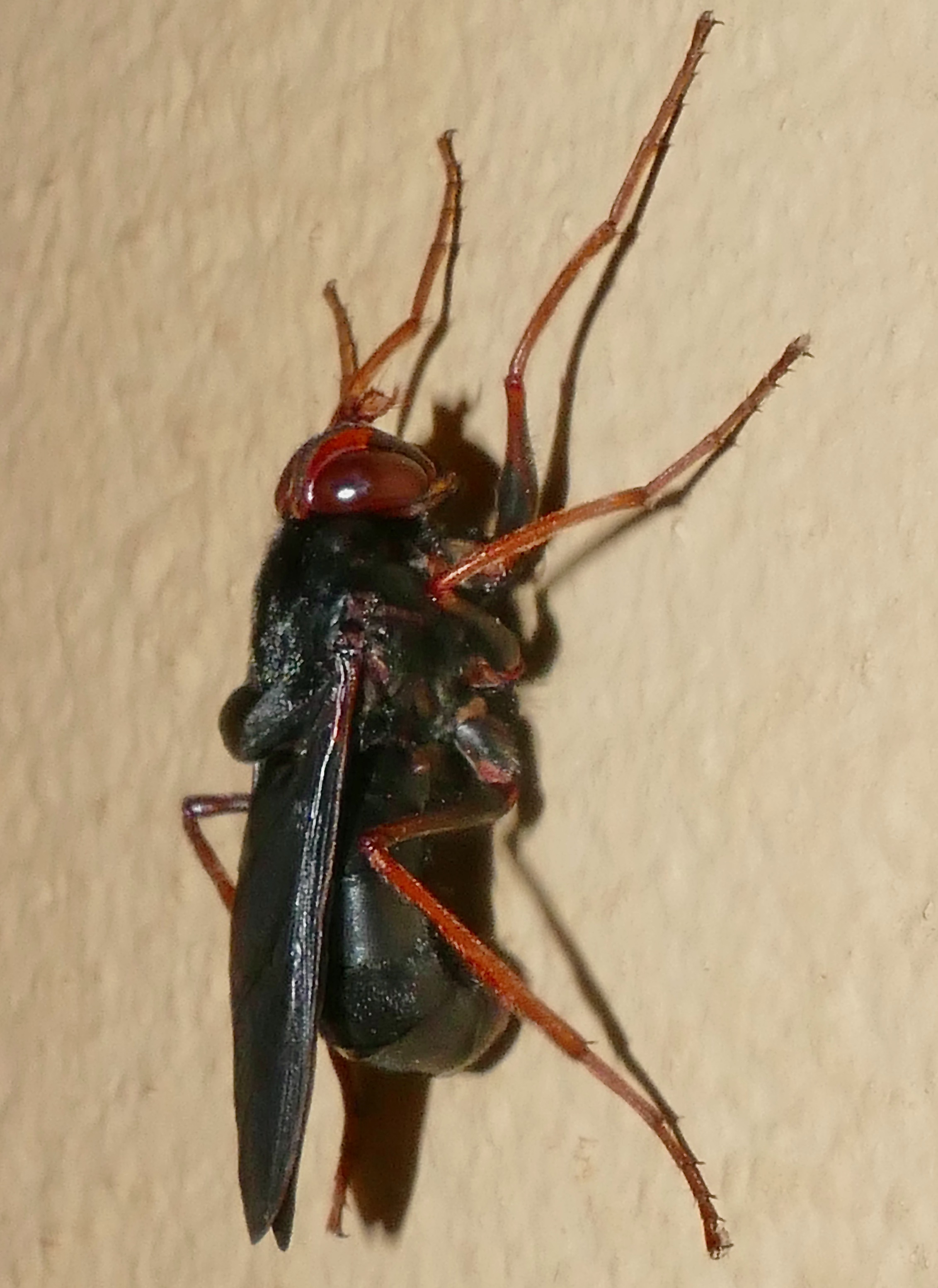

Scientific classification
- Kingdom: Animalia
- Phylum: Arthropoda
- Clade: Pancrustacea
- Class: Insecta
- Order: Diptera
- Family: Oestridae
- Genus: Gyrostigma
- Species: G. rhinocerontis

Binomial name
- Gyrostigma rhinocerontis (Owen, 1830)

= Gyrostigma rhinocerontis =

Species of fly

Gyrostigma rhinocerontis (also known as the Rhinoceros stomach botfly) is the largest fly species known in Africa. It is a parasite of the black rhinoceros and the white rhinoceros.

Because the fly depends on the rhinoceros for reproduction, its numbers declined steeply as the black and white rhinos faced extinction. Like the rhinoceros, it was presumably once widespread across much of sub-Saharan Africa (outside of the Congo Basin), but is today restricted to the savannas of southern and eastern Africa.

== Taxonomy ==
The fly was originally described by English naturalist Sir Richard Owen in 1830 under the name of Oestrus rhinocerontis. The description was made from larvae within the stomach of a rhinoceros. A fuller explanation was given by Fritz Konrad Ernst Zumpt in the mid-20th century. Despite being known for a long time, little is known about some aspects of their life, because they are difficult to observe in the wild as well as to breed in captivity. Only a few large museums have a specimen.

== Life cycle ==
Like other botflies, the adult lays eggs on the host animal, in this case, near the horn of the rhinoceros or elsewhere on the head. The eggs are oblong and white. The eggs hatch after about six days, and the larvae, about 2.5 mm long, burrow inside, and attach themselves to the stomach wall by spines and mouth-hooks. It feeds on the blood and tissue of the rhinoceros.

The larvae pass through three instars (developmental stages) while attached to the stomach. In the first instar, they are colored dark pink and are buried deep within mucosal folds of the stomach lining. In the second instar, the larvae are about 2 cm long, a paler shade of pink, and their spikes are more prominent. At this point only their front ends are imbedded into the folds. In the third instar, the larvae reach adult size, and are whitish to yellow with irregular brown spots. Their spikes form bands three or four rows wide. Rhinoceroses have been observed with large quantities of larvae in various stages.

When it is ready to pupate, it leaves the rhinoceros through the anus. The pupa are not, however, found within dung piles, so they either leave independently or burrow into the ground immediately after defecation. Pupation lasts six weeks, after which the adult fly emerges. The largest adults can reach 4 cm in length and have a wingspan of over 7 cm. They resemble a black wasp with an orange-red head and legs. The wings are brown to black, and are long enough that at rest they run nearly the entire length of the body. Their mouthparts are rudimentary, and they probably do not eat at all as adults.

The evidence is conflicting on what time of day they are active. David A. Barraclough believes that females are active during the day, when eggs are to be deposited on the hosts, while males are active at dawn and dusk, when mating occurs. The flies are airborne for only three to five days before expiring.
