= Hierodoris extensilis =

Conservation status
- Naturally Uncommon (NZ TCS)

Scientific classification
- Kingdom: Animalia
- Phylum: Arthropoda
- Class: Insecta
- Order: Lepidoptera
- Family: Oecophoridae
- Genus: Hierodoris
- Species: H. extensilis

Binomial name
- Hierodoris extensilis Hoare, 2012

Species of moth

Hierodoris extensilis is a species of moth in the family Oecophoridae. It is endemic to New Zealand and is only found in Fiordland where it has been collected from Mount Titiroa and Mount Burns. It occurs in granite sand plains and gravel field habitat and has been collected in early February. As at 2012 the host plant of the larvae of this species is unknown but it has been hypothesised that the larvae may feed on plant roots given the long ovipositor of the female. This species is classified as "At Risk, Naturally Uncommon" by the Department of Conservation.

== Taxonomy ==
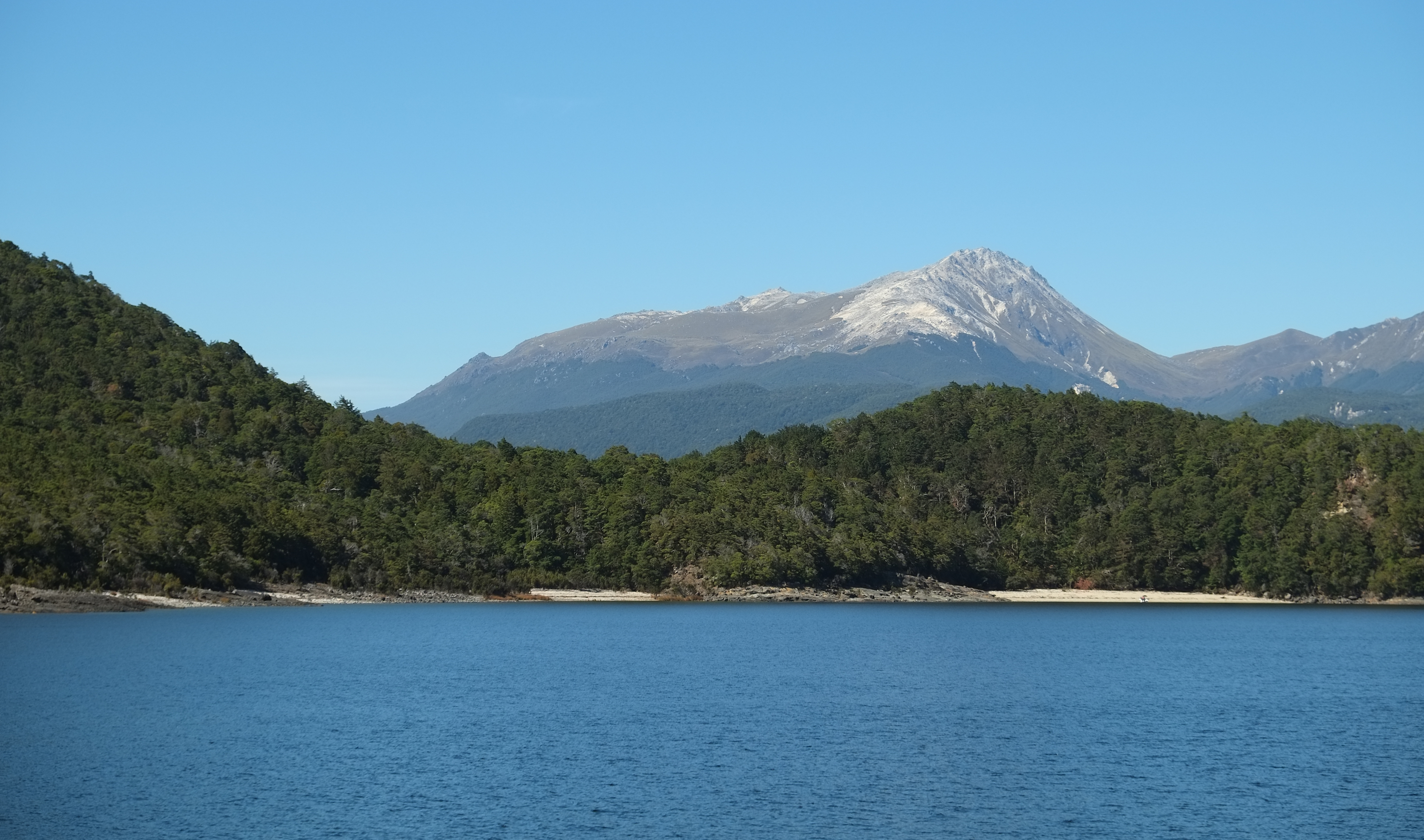
Shore of Lake Manapouri with Mt Titiroa, the type locality of this species, in the background

This species was first described by Robert J. B. Hoare in 2012 and named Heliostibes extensilis. The male holotype specimen, collected at Mount Titiroa in Fiordland, is held at the New Zealand Arthropod Collection.

== Description ==
The wingspan of the male H. extensilis moth is 13–15.5 mm and the female is 12–17.5 mm. This species is visually similar to its close relatives Hierodoris frigida, H. polita and H. gerontion. H. extensilis can be distinguished from both H. frigida and H. polita as it has a whitish hind-wing base. It has a white-scaled surface to its exterior labial palpi and does not have the transverse white forewing fascia of H. polita. H. extensilis can be distinguished from H. gerontion as H. extensilis has shining leaden scales on its forewings, a dark fringe but does not have the curved white subbasal fascia of H. gerontion.

The female of this species has an extremely long telescopic ovipositor. It has been hypothesised that this feature enables the females to lay eggs beneath the surface of the sand close to host plant roots.

== Distribution ==
This species is endemic to New Zealand. It is only found in Fiordland where it has been collected from Mount Titiroa and Mount Burns.

== Biology and behaviour ==
H. extensilis has been collected in early February. It is a day flying moth.

== Habitat and host plants ==
This species occurs in granite sand plains and gravel field habitat. The host plant of the larvae of this species is unknown.

== Conservation status ==
H. extensilis has been classified as having the "At Risk, Naturally Uncommon" conservation status under the New Zealand Threat Classification System.
