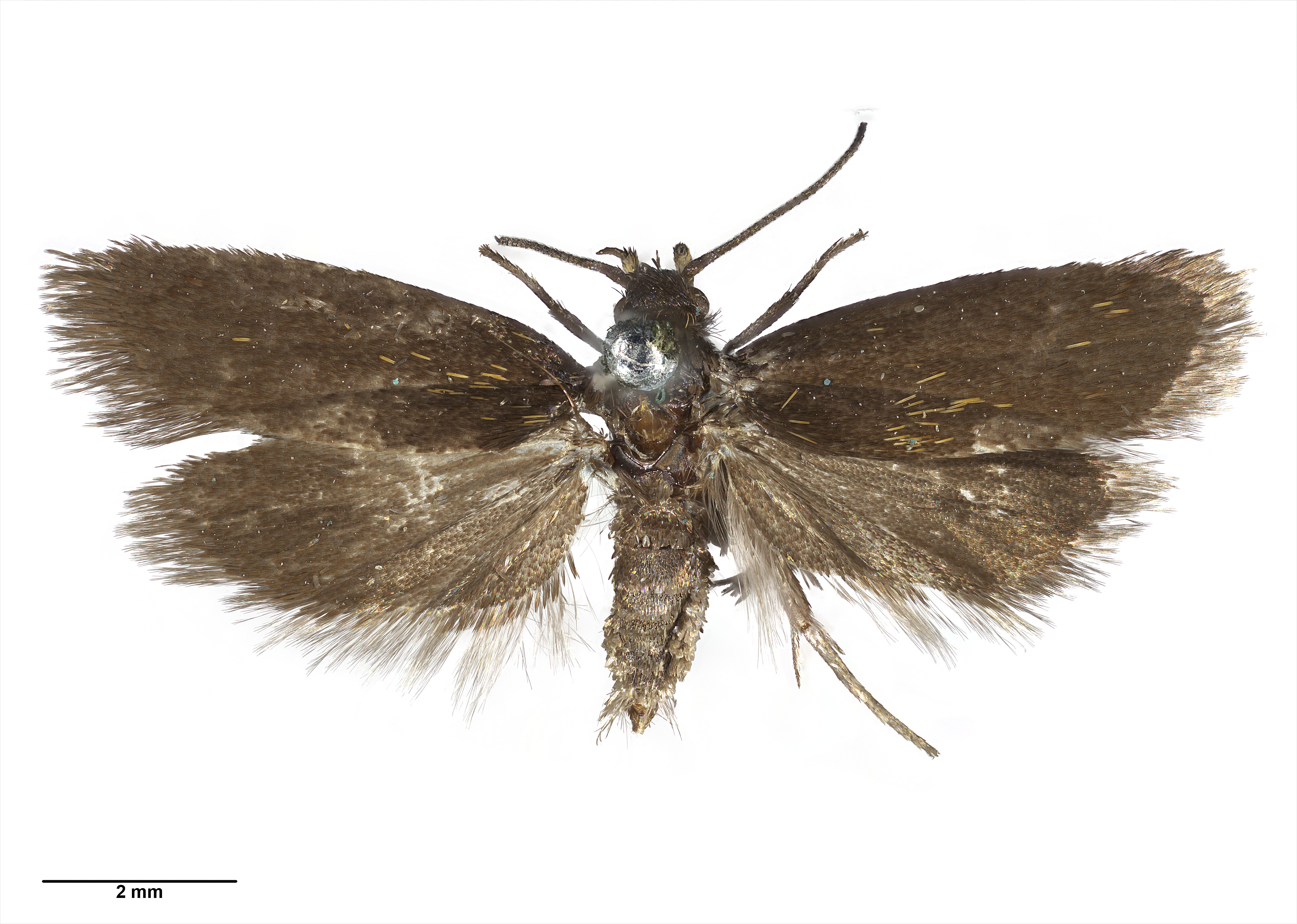
- Holotype of the synonymised species Gymnobathra nigra.

Scientific classification
- Kingdom: Animalia
- Phylum: Arthropoda
- Clade: Pancrustacea
- Class: Insecta
- Order: Lepidoptera
- Family: Oecophoridae
- Genus: Hierodoris
- Species: H. squamea

Binomial name
- Hierodoris squamea (Philpott, 1915)

Synonyms
- Gymnobathra squamea Philpott, 1915; Gymnobathra nigra Philpott, 1930

= Hierodoris squamea =

Species of moth endemic to New Zealand

Hierodoris squamea is a moth of the family Oecophoridae. It is endemic to New Zealand and is found in the mountains of Fiordland as well as the Olivine Range in south Westland. This species has a wingspan of between 12 and 13 mm and can be distinguished from similar species as it is very small in size, has a reduced eyespot on its forewings, clearly visible through Scanning Electron Microscope preparations, and has orange-yellow scales overlaying its dark forewing. This species inhabits open country of tussock grasslands and herbfields at high altitudes. As at 2005 the larvae are unknown. Adults are on the wing in January. In 2025 this species was classified as "data deficient" under the New Zealand Threat Classification System.

== Taxonomy ==
This species was first described by Alfred Philpott in 1915 and named Gymnobathra squamea. Both George Hudson and J. S. Dugdale discussed this species under this name. Hudson synonymised Gymnobathra nigra with G. squamea in 1939 stating that the holotype for G. nigra was a worn specimen of G. squamea. In 2005 Robert Hoare placed this species within the genus Hierodoris. The male holotype specimen, collected at Cleughearn at 3500 feet by Philpott, is held at the New Zealand Arthropod Collection.

== Description ==
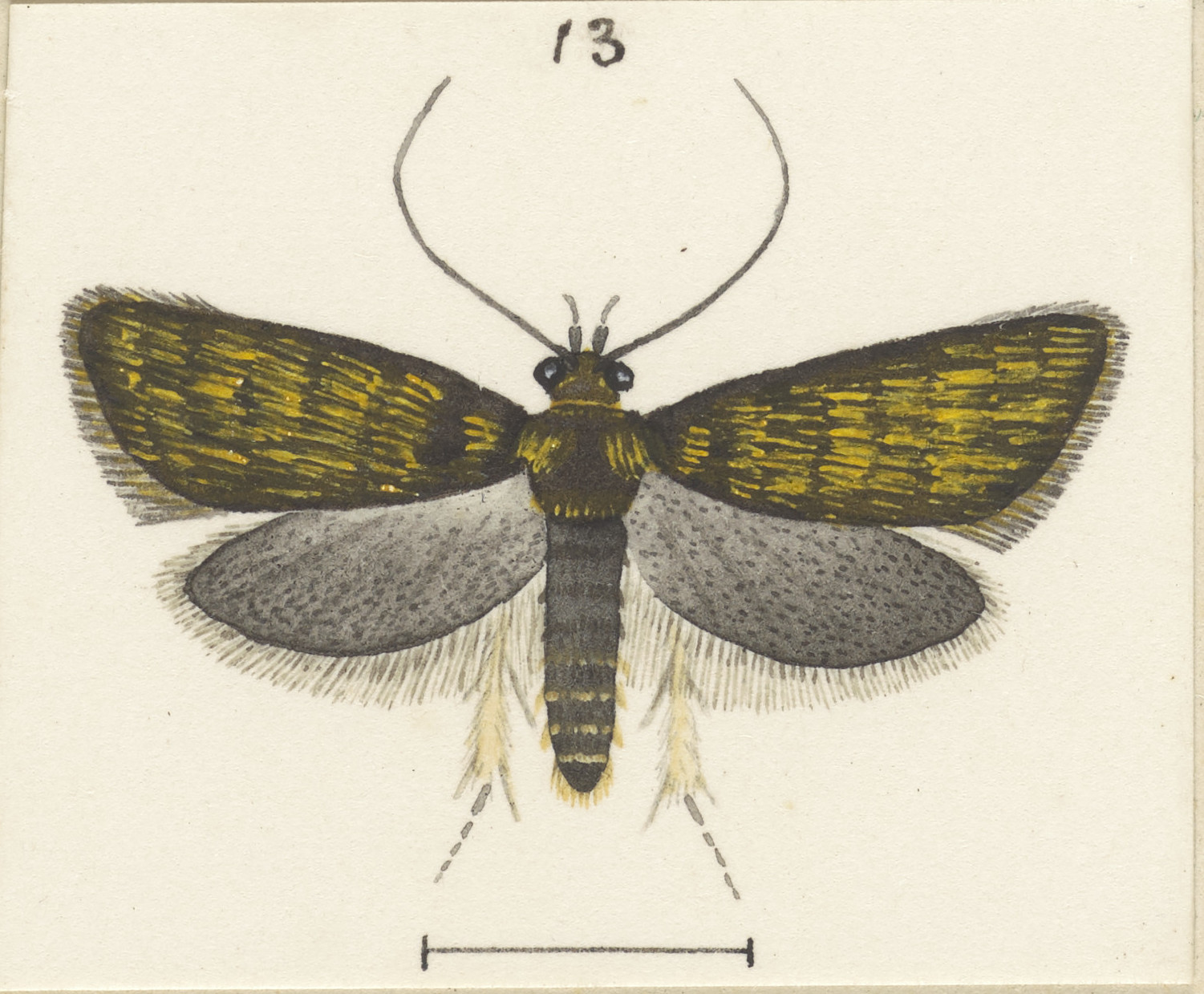
H. squamea illustrated by George Hudson.

Philpott described this species as follows:

♂. 12 mm. Head dark fuscous with a few yellow scales. Palpi bright yellow, fuscous beneath. Antennae fuscous. Thorax dark fuscous mixed with yellow. Abdomen fuscous broadly annulated with grey. Forewings moderate, costa moderately arched, apex obtuse, termen almost straight, somewhat oblique; bright golden-yellow irrorated and suffused, especially near base, with fuscous: cilia dark fuscous. Hindwings dark fuscous: cilia grey-whitish with fuscous basal line.

This species has a wingspan of between 12 and 13 mm and can be distinguished from similar species as it is very small in size, has a reduced eyespot on its forewings, clearly visible through Scanning Electron Microscope preparations, and has orange-yellow scales overlaying its dark forewing. As at 2005 the larvae are unknown.

== Distribution ==
This species is endemic to New Zealand and is found in the mountains of Fiordland as well as the Olivine Range in south Westland.

== Habitat and hosts ==
This species prefers open country of tussock grasslands and herbfields at high altitudes.

== Behaviour ==
Adults of this species are on the wing in January.

== Conservation status ==
In 2025 this species was classified by the New Zealand Department of Conservation as "data deficient" under the New Zealand Threat Classification System.
