= Hierodoris pachystegiae =

Scientific classification
- Kingdom: Animalia
- Phylum: Arthropoda
- Class: Insecta
- Order: Lepidoptera
- Family: Oecophoridae
- Genus: Hierodoris
- Species: H. pachystegiae

Binomial name
- Hierodoris pachystegiae Hoare, 2005

Species of moth endemic to New Zealand

Hierodoris pachystegiae is a moth of the family Oecophoridae. It is endemic to New Zealand and has only been collected at Kaikōura. The larval host are plants in the genus Pachystegia which is found only in the Marlborough region. The larvae of this species have yet to be described from life but the adults of this species are predominantly grey in colour. The forewings of this species have silver markings similar to that of H. electrica.

== Taxonomy ==
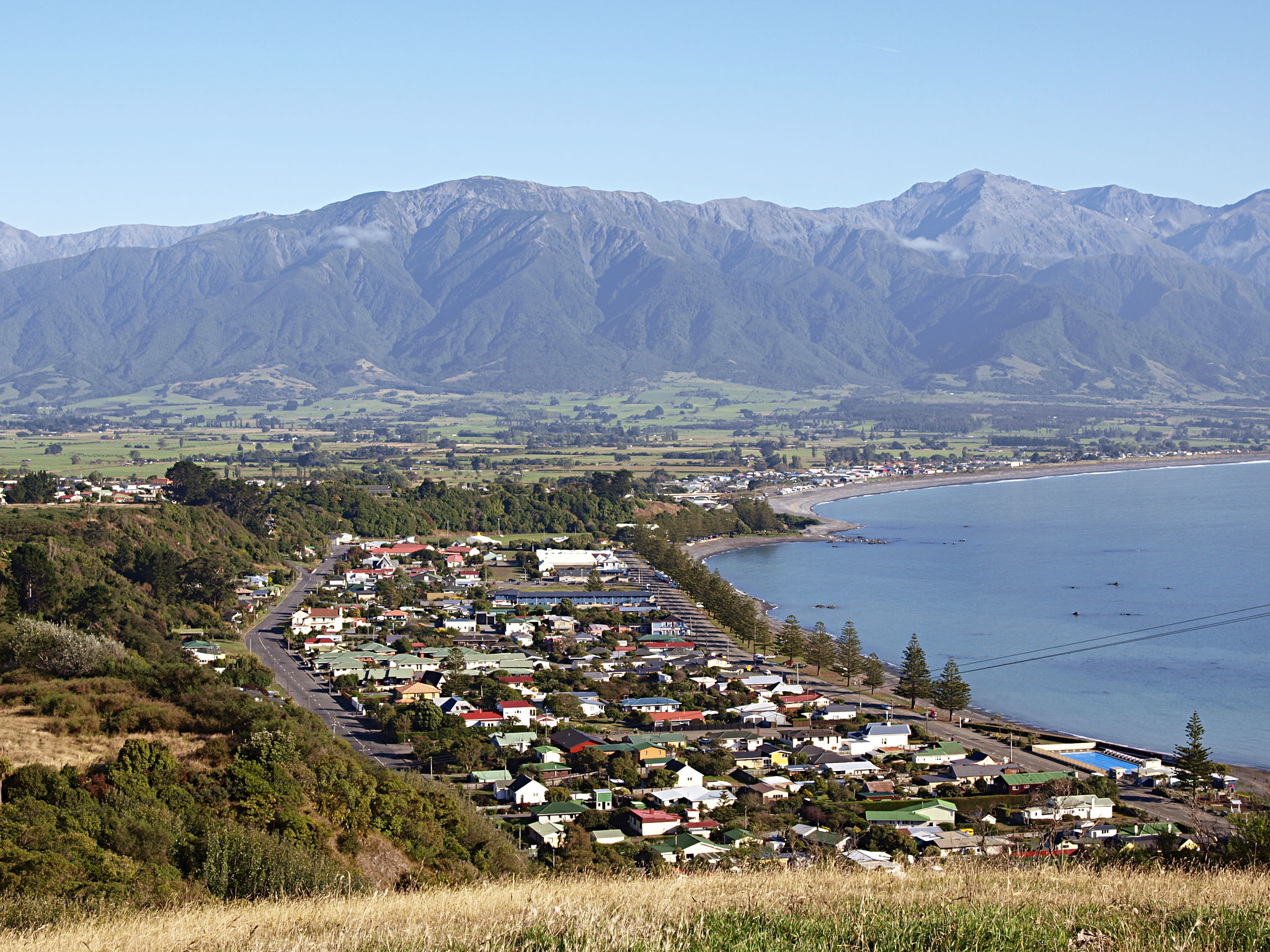
Kaikoura, type locality of H. pachystegiae.

This species was first described by Robert R. J. Hoare in 2005 using specimens collected in Kaikōura. The male holotype specimen was reared from larvae collected by Hoare and J. S. Dugdale and found in the seed heads of a Marlborough rock daisy at Kaikōura.

== Description ==
The wingspan of this species is between 15 and 18.5 mm. This species is predominantly grey in colour but has silver markings on its forewings similar to that of H. electrica. As at 2005, the larvae have yet to be described from life.

== Distribution ==
This species is endemic to New Zealand and has only been collected in and around the Kaikōura coast.

== Habitat and host species ==
The larval host of this species are plants in the genus Pachystegia. The plant species in Pachystegia are only found in the Marlborough region. The larvae feed on the tomentum on the underside of the leaves of their host plant.
