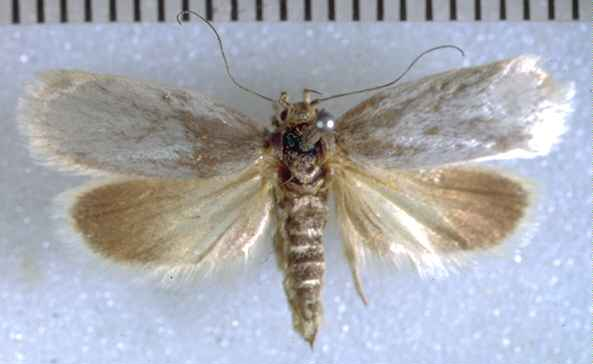

Conservation status
- Data Deficit (NZ TCS)

Scientific classification
- Kingdom: Animalia
- Phylum: Arthropoda
- Clade: Pancrustacea
- Class: Insecta
- Order: Lepidoptera
- Family: Oecophoridae
- Genus: Hierodoris
- Species: H. eremita

Binomial name
- Hierodoris eremita Philpott, 1930

= Hierodoris eremita =

Species of moth endemic to New Zealand

Hierodoris eremita is a moth of the family Oecophoridae. It is endemic to New Zealand and found in the areas around Aoraki / Mount Cook and Westland Tai Poutini National Park areas. This species inhabits alpine herbfields at altitudes of around 900–1400 m. Larvae are said to have been reared on the leaves of plants in the Celmisia genus. Pupation happens on the host plant. Adults are day flying and are on the wing between December and June. In 2025 this species was classified as "data deficient" under the New Zealand Threat Classification System.

== Taxonomy ==
This species was described by Alfred Philpott in 1930 using five female specimens collected in December at Hooker Valley and Ball Glacier Hutt. The holotype specimen is held at the Canterbury Museum.

== Description ==
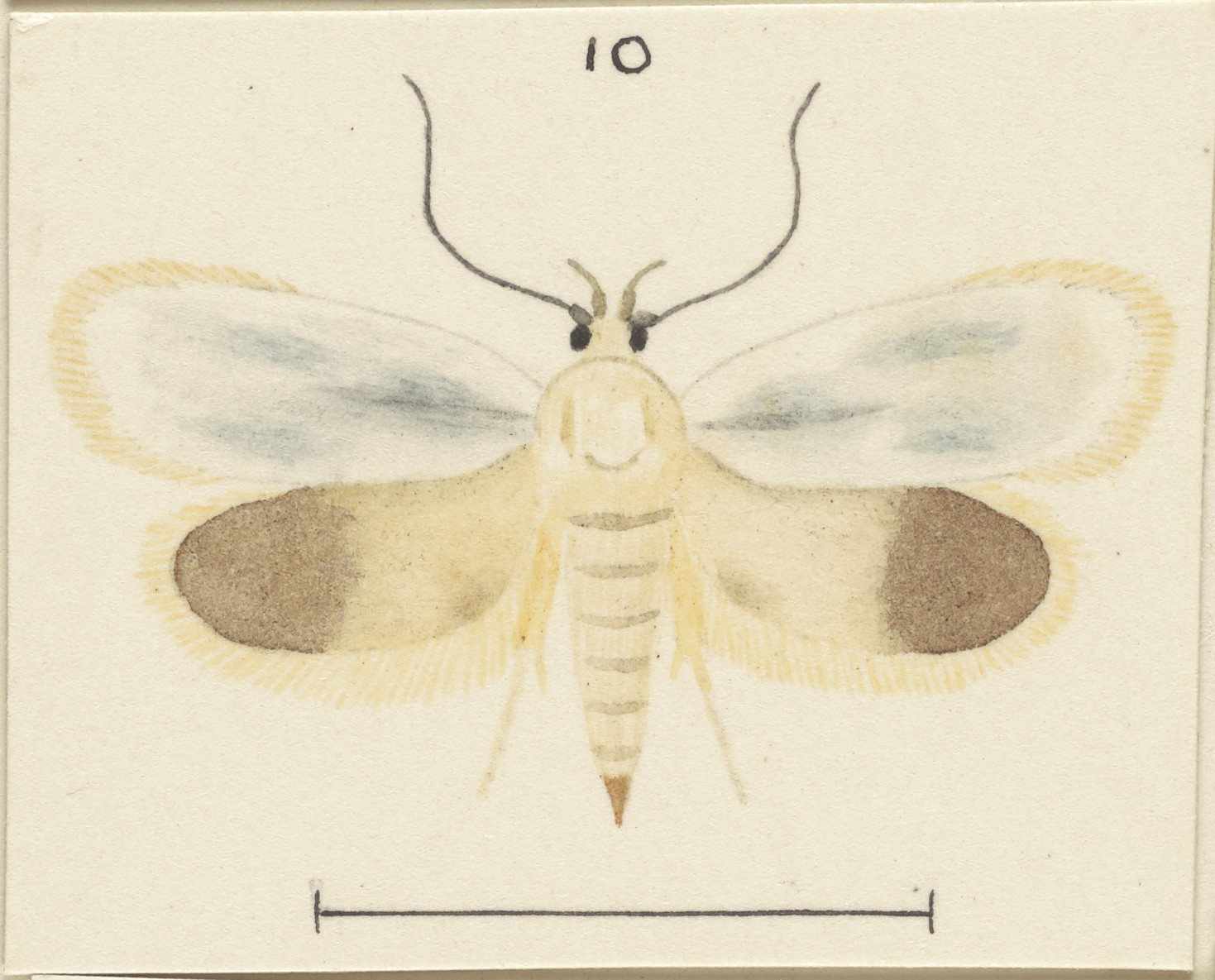
H. eremita illustrated by George Hudson.

As at 2005 the larvae have not yet been described.

Philpott described this species as follows:

♀. 22-24 mm. Head whitish-ochreous. Palpi, ochreous-whitish mixed outwardly with brown. Antennae whitish, closely annulated with fuscous. Thorax leaden white. Abdomen whitish-ochreous. broadly banded with dark fuscous dorsally. Legs ochreous white. Forewings oblong, costa strongly arched, apex broadly rounded, termen rounded, not oblique; shining white, faintly ochreous tinged towards termen: fringes white. Hindwings ochreous white, iridescent; apical half fuscous: fringes white.

Philpott noted that the female specimens he was using to describe the species were very similar in appearance to moths in the Gelophaula genus.

== Distribution ==
This species is endemic to New Zealand and is found around the Aoraki / Mount Cook and Westland Tai Poutini National Park areas in the Westland and Mackenzie districts.

== Behaviour ==
Pupation happens on the host plant. The adults of this species is on the wing between December and June. This species is day flying.

== Habitat and host species ==
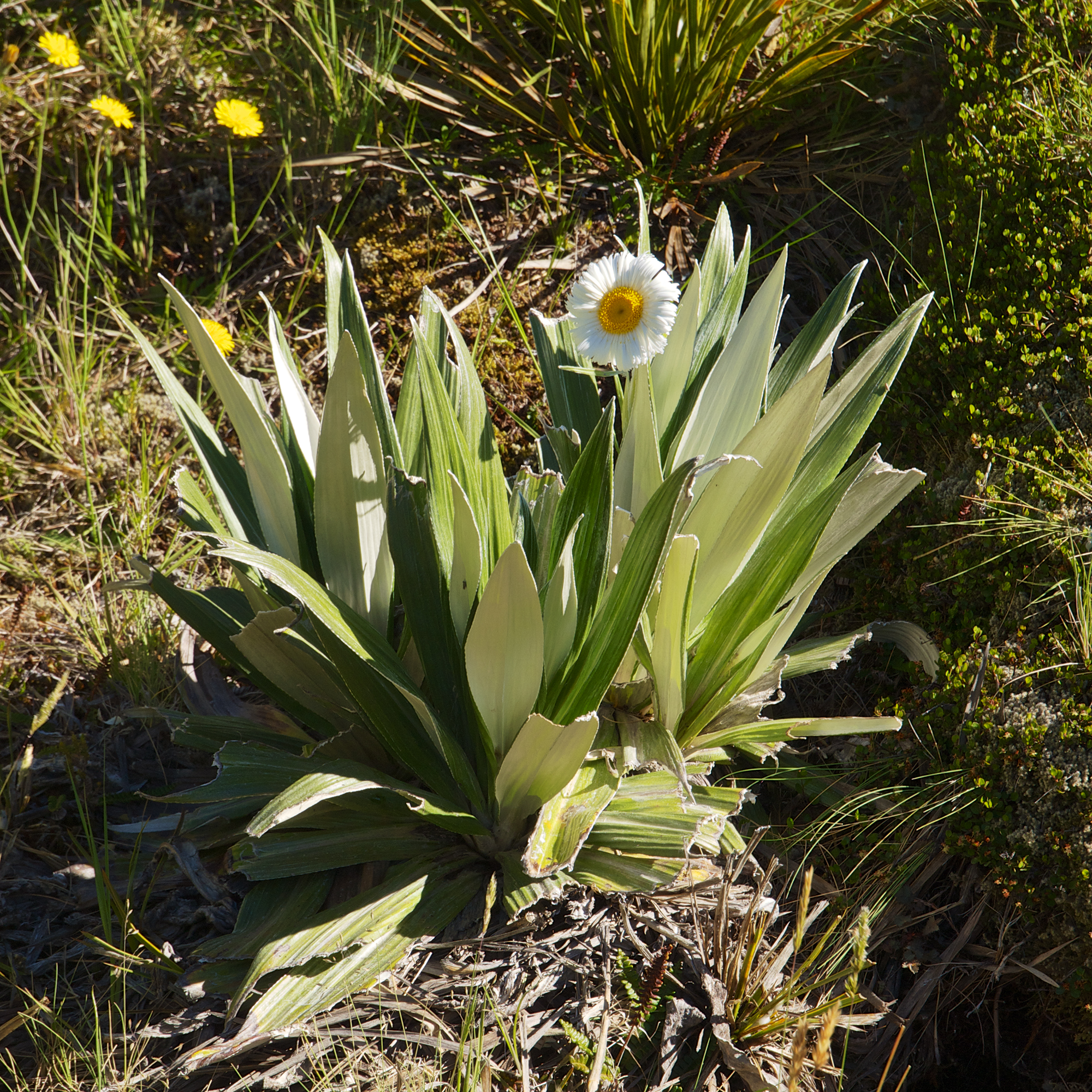
Celmisia semicordata in the Hooker Valley

This species inhabits alpine herbfields at altitudes of around 900–1400 m. Larvae are said to have been reared on the leaves of Celmisia coriacea from which they had been collected at the Sealy Range. The larvae feed on the underside of the leaves of their host plant. In 1980 the taxonomy of Celmisia coriacea was revised. This species is only found in Fiordland and Southland. Celmisia coriacea is often confused with Celmisia semicordata, a similar looking species with a wider range, including the area around Aoraki / Mount Cook.

== Conservation status ==
In 2025 this species was classified by the New Zealand Department of Conservation as "data deficient" under the New Zealand Threat Classification System.
