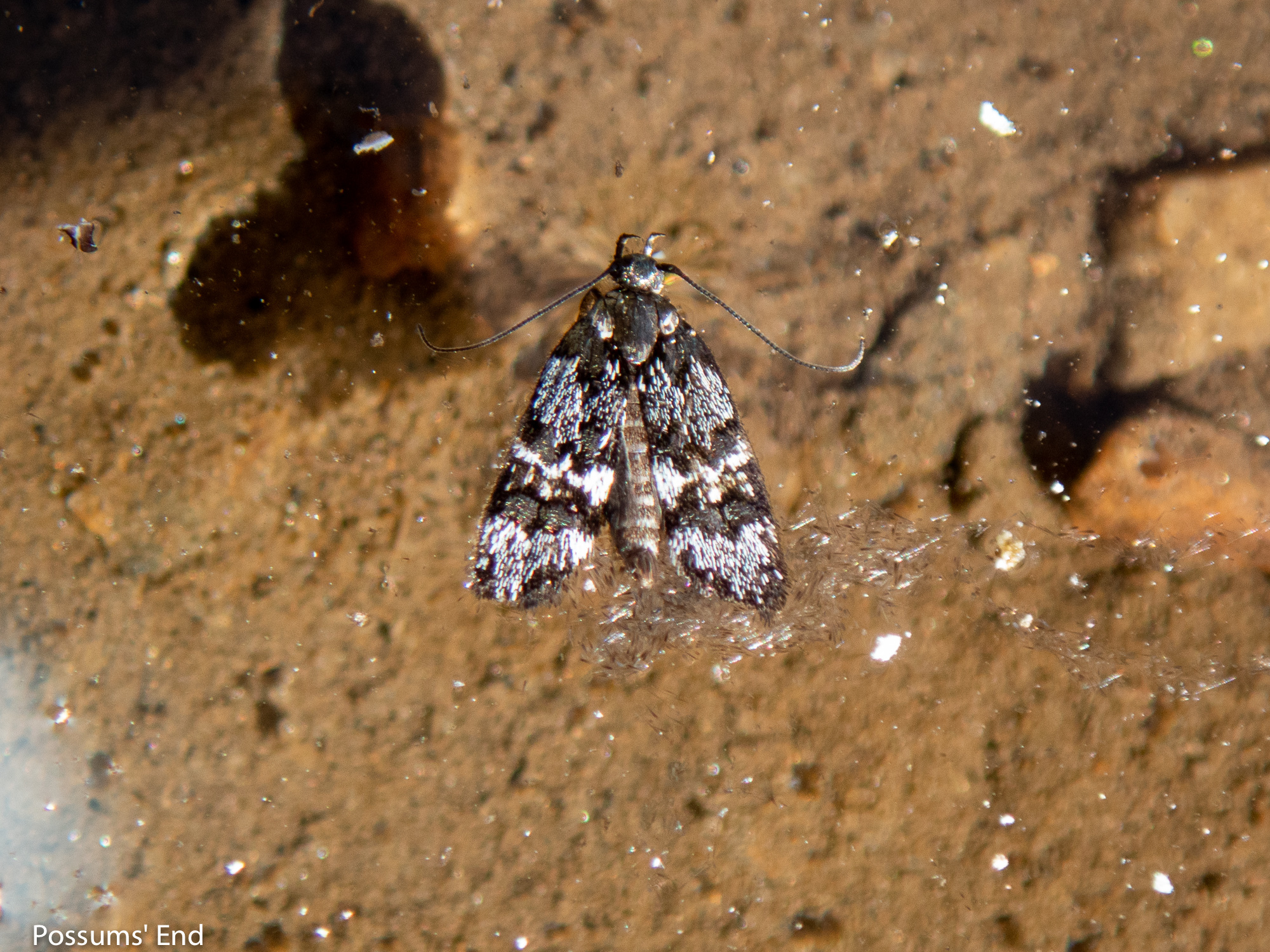

Conservation status
- Naturally Uncommon (NZ TCS)

Scientific classification
- Kingdom: Animalia
- Phylum: Arthropoda
- Class: Insecta
- Order: Lepidoptera
- Family: Oecophoridae
- Genus: Hierodoris
- Species: H. polita

Binomial name
- Hierodoris polita Hoare, 2005

= Hierodoris polita =

Species of moth, endemic to New Zealand

Hierodoris polita is a species of moth in the family Oecophoridae. It is endemic to New Zealand and is found only in the Central Otago region and in the Dunedin area. As at 2005 the larvae have yet to be identified. However it is possible that a specimen may have been collected in leaf litter thus leading to the hypothesis that the species may be a detritivore. The adults of this species prefer open habitat and have mainly been collected on south-facing rocky bluffs. The adult moths are on the wing in October, November and January to March. This species is classified as "At Risk, Naturally Uncommon" by the Department of Conservation.

== Taxonomy ==
This species was first described by Robert J. B. Hoare in 2005 and named Hierodoris polita. Prior to its scientific description H. polita was known as H. 'silver banded'. The holotype specimen, which was collected by John S. Dugdale at Craig Flat, Clutha Valley on 16 March 1986, is held at the New Zealand Arthropod Collection.

== Description ==
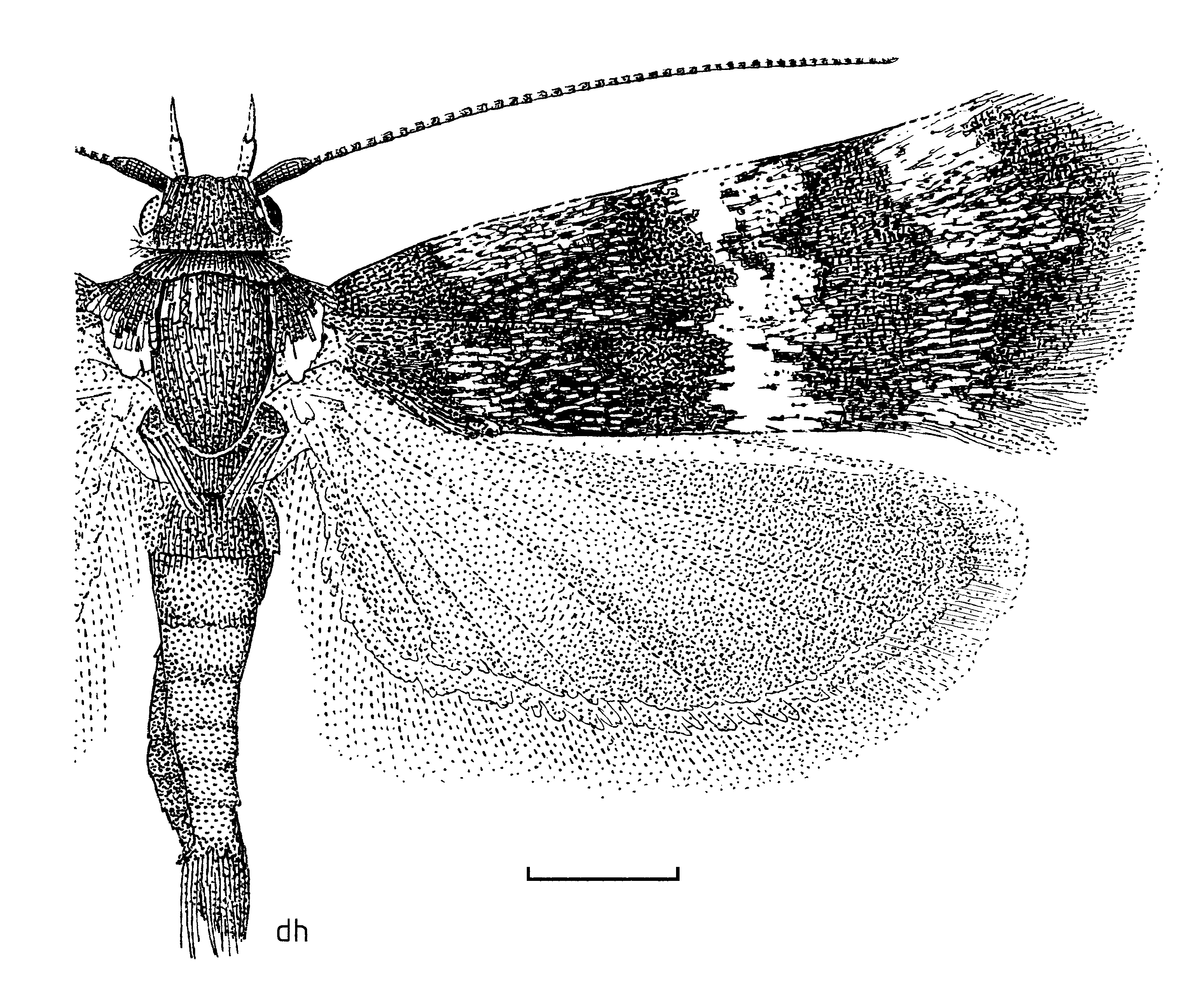
Illustration of H. polita by Des Helmore.

The wingspan of the male of the species is between 11-14.5 mm and the female is between 12.5-13.5 mm.

Hierodoris polita is very similar in appearance to its close relatives Hierodoris frigida and H. extensilis. It can be distinguished from H. frigida as H. polita lacks the all-yellow segment 2 of the labial palp as well as the yellowish white spot that H. frigida has on its costa. H. polita has white scales on the posterior part of the tegulae where as H. frigida has a dark tegulae. H. polita also has a white transverse band on the forewing that H. frigida lacks.

Hierodoris polita can be distinguished from H. extensilis as the later has a white base to the hindwing whereas H. polita has a bronzy base. The exterior surface of the labial palpi of H. extensilis is white-scaled whereas H. polita is dark-scaled. H. polita also has a transverse white forewing fascia which both H. extensilis and H. frigida lack.

== Distribution ==
This species is endemic to New Zealand. It can only be found in the South Island in the Central Otago and Dunedin areas. H. polita is classified as range restricted indicating its local distribution.

== Biology and behaviour ==
Although larvae of this species have not been conclusively identified, a likely specimen was collected in leaf litter consisting of detritus of Grimmia laevigata. It has therefore been hypothesised that the larvae of H. polita is a detritivore. The species has been found on the wing in October, November, and January to March.

== Habitat and host species ==
This species is known to prefer open habitat and has so far mainly been collected at south-facing rocky bluffs upon which grow species of Grimmia moss.

== Conservation status ==
This species has been classified as having the "At Risk, Naturally Uncommon" conservation status under the New Zealand Threat Classification System.
