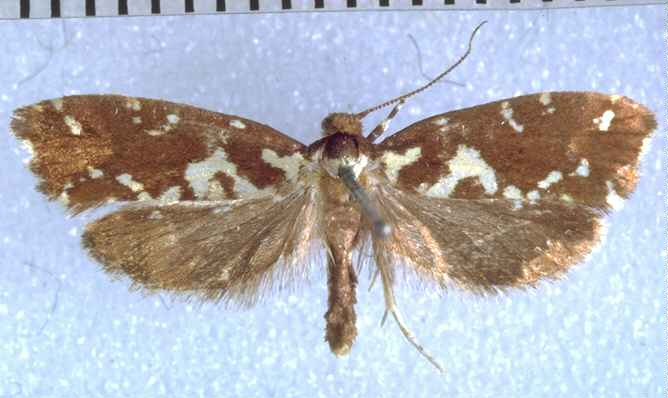
- Hierodoris (s.l.) stellata holotype

Scientific classification
- Kingdom: Animalia
- Phylum: Arthropoda
- Class: Insecta
- Order: Lepidoptera
- Family: Oecophoridae
- Genus: Hierodoris
- Species: H. stellata

Binomial name
- Hierodoris stellata Philpott, 1918

= Hierodoris stellata =

Species of moth endemic to New Zealand

Hierodoris stellata is a species of moth in the family Plutellidae. It is endemic to New Zealand and is found in Fiordland and Dunedin. This species has been found in coastal native forest. Larvae feed on Astelia flower-spikes and adults are on the wing in late December and January. It has been stated that this species belongs to the genus Charixena however this placement has yet to be published. As such this species is currently known as Hierodoris (s.l.) stellata or 'Hierodoris' stellata.

== Taxonomy ==
This species was first described by Alfred Philpott in 1918 using a specimen collected at Blue Cliff in Te Waewae Bay, Fiordland by C.C. Fenwick in January. Fenwick captured this specimen in bush at night. Philpott named the species Hierodoris ? stellata as he was unsure of the genus and suspected it may belong to a previously unrecorded genus in New Zealand. In 1988 Dugdale placed this species within the family Plutellidae and this placement was agreed with by Robert Hoare in 2005. Hoare went on to communicate this species should be placed in the genus Charixena but that this had yet to be published. As such this species is currently known as Hierodoris (s.l.) stellata or 'Hierodoris' stellata. The male holotype specimen is held at Te Papa.

== Description ==
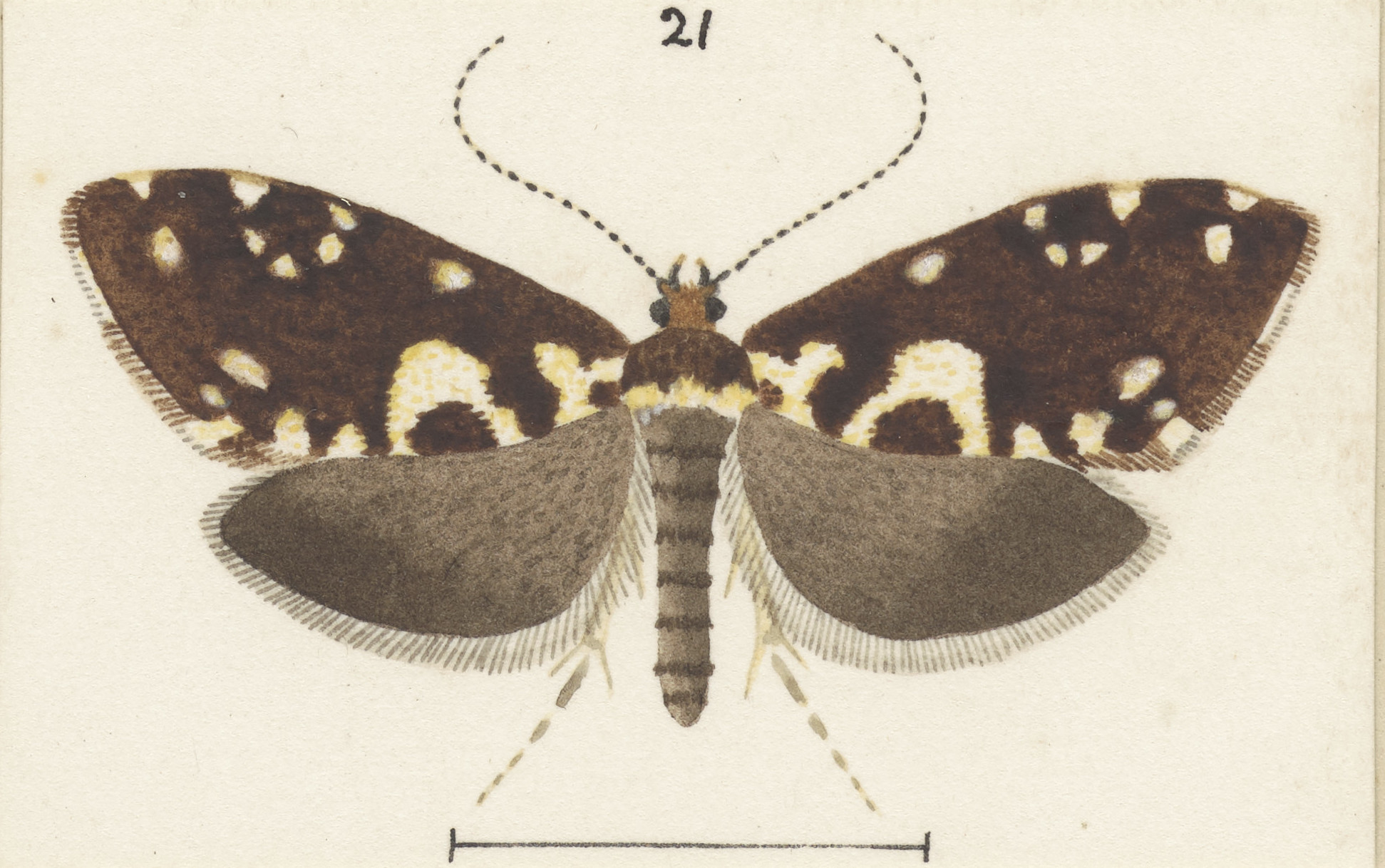
Illustration by George Hudson.

Philpott described this species as follows:

♂. 20mm. Head ferruginous-brown. Palpi dark fuscous, apex of second joint beneath and apex of terminal joint whitish. Antennae narrowly annulated with ferruginous-brown and white. Thorax, anterior half dark cupreous with purplish sheen, posterior half white. Abdomen greyish-fuscous. Legs fuscous-grey, anterior pair darker, tarsi broadly annulated with white. Forewings, costa strongly arched, apex rounded, termen subsinuate, little oblique, rounded beneath; shining cupreous; markings white; an irregularly-triangular basal patch on lower half of wing, its upper edge indented; a round spot beneath costa at 1/4; a chain of small spots from costa at 1/2 curving round to costa at 5/8; an inwardly-oblique series of two or three spots from costa at 7/8; a dot on costa before apex; a large triangular patch on dorsum before middle, its apex reaching to centre of wing and its base broadly bifid; a round spot on dorsum at 1/2, followed by a series of spots which curve round to tornus: cilia cupreous with white patches beneath apex and at tornus. Hindwings elongate-ovate; dark fuscous: cilia paler, with obscure dark basal line and tips whitish round apex.

== Habitat and host ==
This species has been found in coastal native forest. Larvae feed on Astelia flower-spikes and adults are on the wing in December and January.
