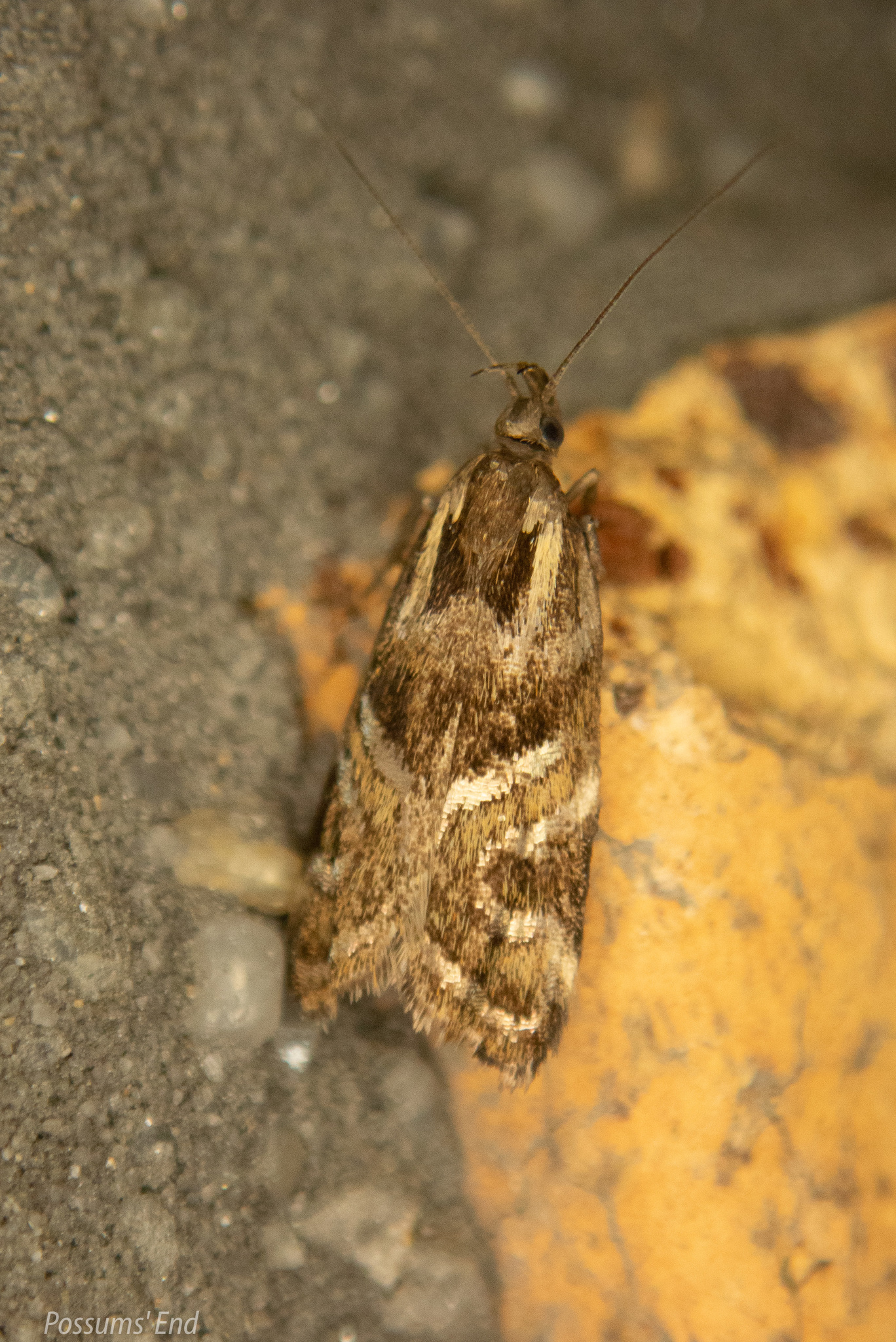

Scientific classification
- Kingdom: Animalia
- Phylum: Arthropoda
- Class: Insecta
- Order: Lepidoptera
- Family: Oecophoridae
- Genus: Hierodoris
- Species: H. s-fractum

Binomial name
- Hierodoris s-fractum Hoare, 2005

= Hierodoris s-fractum =

Species of moth endemic to New Zealand

Hierodoris s-fractum is a moth of the family Oecophoridae. It is endemic to New Zealand and can be found only in the southern parts of the South Island. The male is larger than the female. This species is very similar in appearance to H. eletrica however H. s-fractum has an interrupted silver S-mark on the forewing and longer labial palps. The larvae has not yet been described. Hoare hypothesised that the larvae of this species likely feeds on leaf-litter. The species seems to prefer open dry areas and can be found in native shrub and gorse.

== Taxonomy ==
This species was described by Robert Hoare in 2005. The male holotype specimen, collected in West Melton, is held at the New Zealand Arthropod Collection.

== Description ==
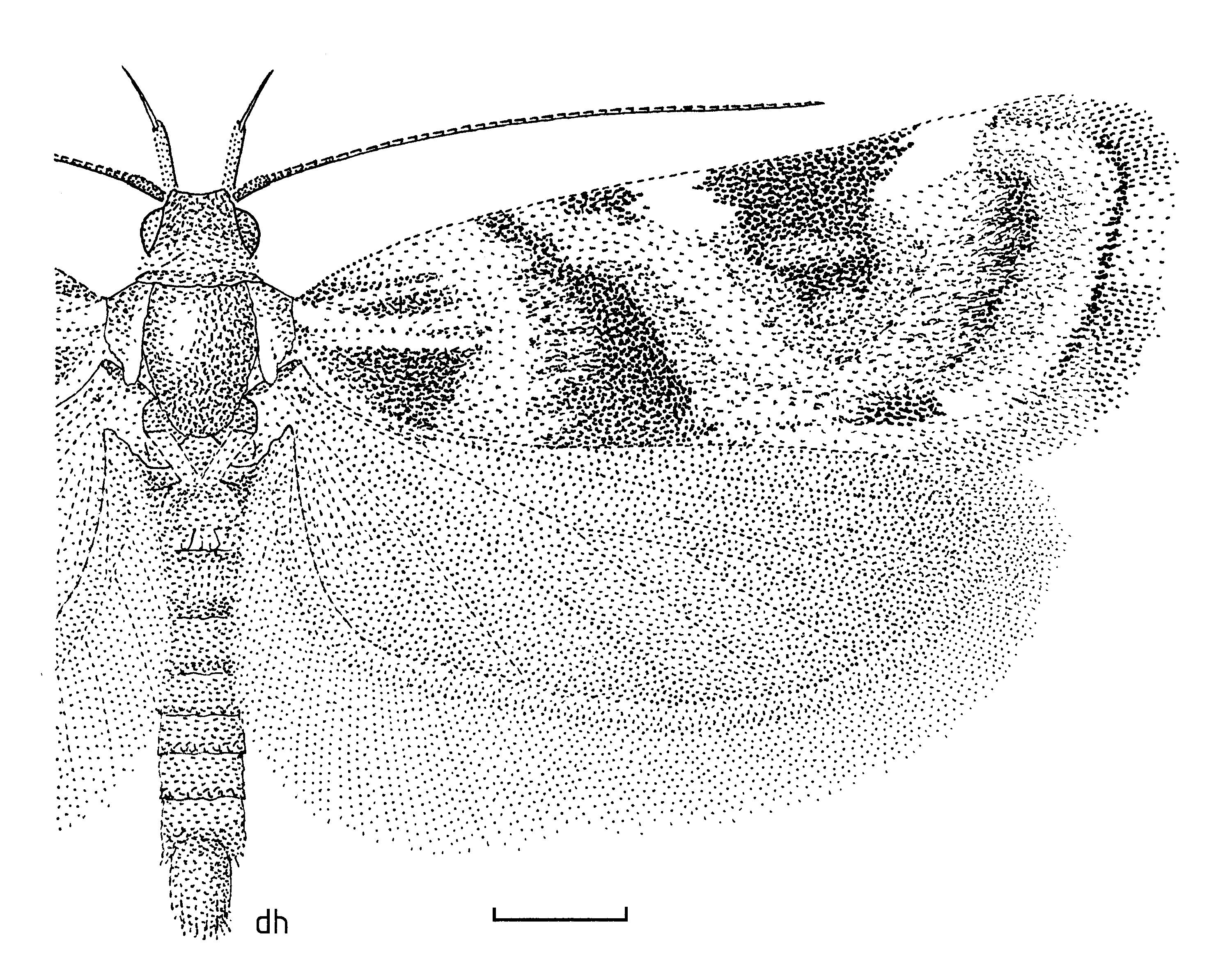
Hierodoris s-fractum illustrated by Des Helmore.

The wingspan of the male is between 14.5 and 17 mm, while the female has a smaller wingspan of between 12 and 14 mm. The female shows slightly brachypterous wings and may not fly often. This species is very similar in appearance to H. eletrica however H. s-fractum has an interrupted silver S-mark on the forewing and longer labial palps. The larvae has not yet been described.

== Distribution ==
This species is endemic to New Zealand and can be found only in the southern parts of the South Island.

== Habitat and host species ==
Hoare hypothesised that the larvae of this species likely feeds on leaf-litter. The species seems to prefer open dry areas and can be found in native shrub and gorse.
