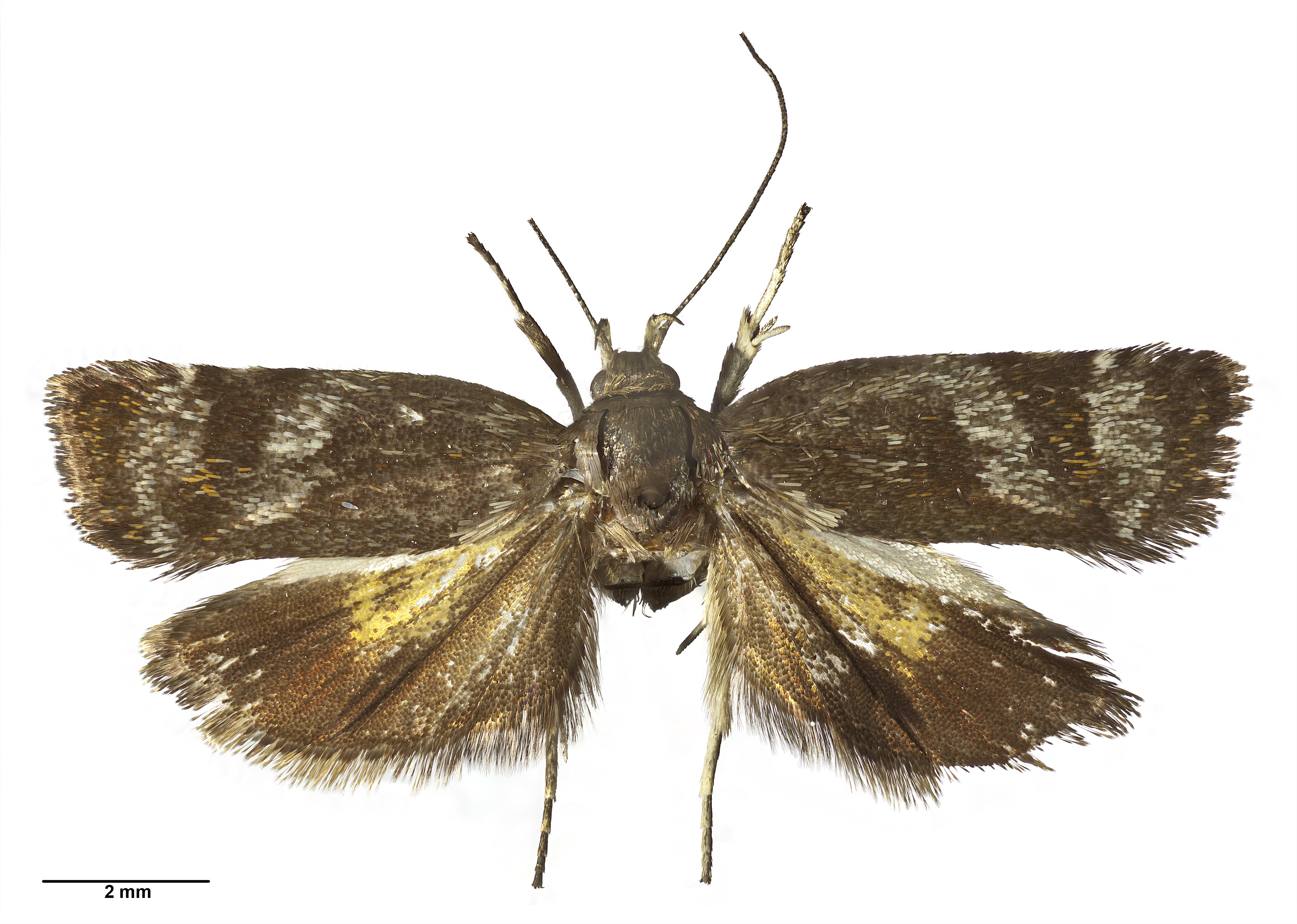
- Type specimen of Hierodoris bilineata

Scientific classification
- Kingdom: Animalia
- Phylum: Arthropoda
- Class: Insecta
- Order: Lepidoptera
- Family: Oecophoridae
- Subfamily: Oecophorinae
- Genus: Hierodoris; Meyrick, 1912

Synonyms
- Coridomorpha Meyrick, 1914; Taoscelis Meyrick, 1938

= Hierodoris =

Genus of moths

Hierodoris is a genus of moths in the family Oecophoridae. It was first described by Edward Meyrick in 1912. This genus is only known from New Zealand. In 1988 the genus Taoscelis was synonymised with Hierodoris. In 2005 the genus Coridomorpha was synonymised with Hierodoris. It is alternatively placed in the family Xyloryctidae after Kaila, 2013, supported by Heikkilä et al. 2014.

== Species ==
The species that are currently placed in this genus are:

- Hierodoris atychioides (Butler, 1877)
- Hierodoris bilineata (Salmon, 1948)
- Hierodoris callispora (Meyrick, 1912)
- Hierodoris electrica (Meyrick, 1889)
- Hierodoris eremita Philpott, 1930
- Hierodoris extensilis Hoare, 2012
- Hierodoris frigida Philpott, 1923
- Hierodoris gerontion Hoare, 2005
- Hierodoris huia Hoare, 2005
- Hierodoris illita (Felder & Rogenhofer, 1875)
- Hierodoris insignis Philpott, 1926
- Hierodoris iophanes Meyrick, 1912
- Hierodoris pachystegiae Hoare, 2005
- Hierodoris polita Hoare, 2005
- Hierodoris sesioides Hoare, 2005
- Hierodoris s-fractum Hoare, 2005
- Hierodoris squamea (Philpott, 1915)
- Hierodoris stella (Meyrick, 1914)
- Hierodoris stellata Philpott, 1918
- Hierodoris torrida Hoare, 2005
- Hierodoris tygris Hoare, 2005

However as at 2005 the placement of both Hierodoris insignis and Hierodoris stellata in this genus is in doubt.
