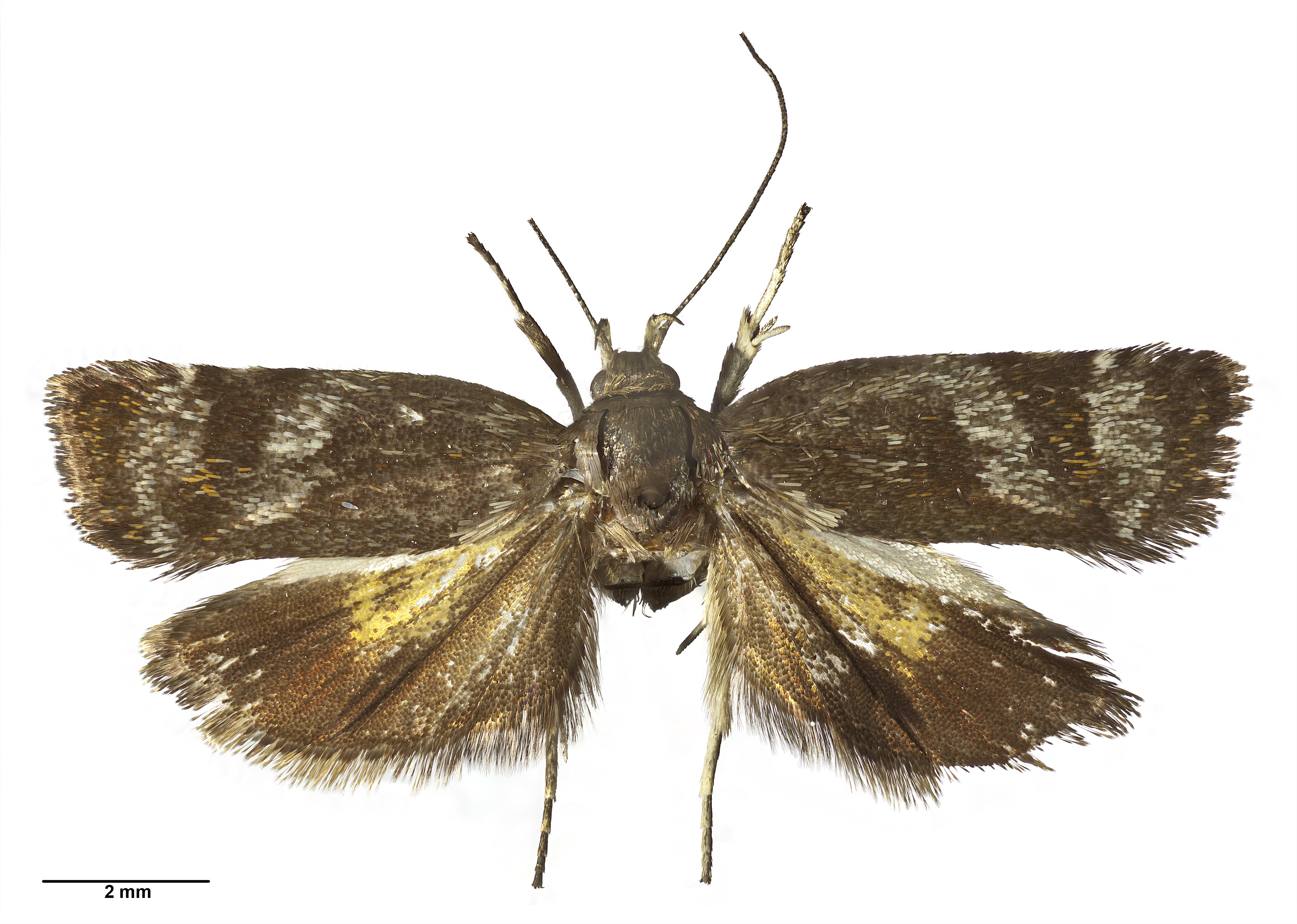
- Holotype specimen

Conservation status
- Data Deficit (NZ TCS)

Scientific classification
- Kingdom: Animalia
- Phylum: Arthropoda
- Clade: Pancrustacea
- Class: Insecta
- Order: Lepidoptera
- Family: Oecophoridae
- Genus: Hierodoris
- Species: H. bilineata

Binomial name
- Hierodoris bilineata (Salmon, 1948)

Synonyms
- Heliostibes bilineata Salmon, 1948

= Hierodoris bilineata =

Species of moth, endemic to New Zealand

Hierodoris bilineata is a species of moth in the family Oecophoridae. It is endemic to New Zealand and has been found on the Manawatāwhi / Three Kings Islands. The adults are on the wing in April and May. Although the larval host is unknown this species is associated with Kunzea ericoides. It is possible that this species gives birth to live young.

In 2025 this species was classified as "data deficient" under the New Zealand Threat Classification System by the Department of Conservation.

== Taxonomy ==
This species was first described by John Salmon in 1948 using specimens obtained from flowering kanuka trees on Great Island, Three Kings Islands by E. G. Turbot and named Heliostibes bilineata. In 1988 John S. Dugdale assigned the species to the genus Hierodoris. The holotype specimen is held at the Auckland War Memorial Museum.

== Description ==
Salmon describes the species as follows:

The expansion of the wings is 15mm. The forewings are somewhat rectangular in shape, on the distal half, with the costa strongly arched to the base; dark brown in colour with a cloudy blackish spot at the centre and another at two-thirds; between these two spots from the costa almost to the dorsum runs a broad band of whitish scales superimposed upon the ground of dark-brown; beyond the distal blackish spot is a second similar whitish line; these two lines are inclined toward one another and may be joined by a thin line above the dorsum giving the appearance of a broad U-shaped band. There is a small tuft of whitish scales basally scattered over the entire forewings and impart a pleasing bronzy reflection to them. Hind wings are dark-brown with the costa broadly white basally, narrowing towards the apex, and shaded with bright orange-yellow from the base almost to the centre. Cilia of the fore-wings dark brown, of the hind wings ochreous-brown shaded with dark-brown at the base. Head and thorax heavily scaled; patagia small, dark brown. Body entirely dark-brown above with transverse intersegmental bands of bright-orange across the abdomen; below it is profusely shaded with whitish scales. Legs, antennae, and palpi dark-brown similarly shaded with whitish scales.

Hierodoris bilineata can be distinguished from other species in its genus as it has unmarked and unmodified antennae, a non-metallic appearance to its thorax and it is smaller in size than other species of similar appearance.

== Distribution ==
This species is endemic to New Zealand. It is likely that H. bilineata is found only at the Three Kings Islands. Along with its type locality of Great Island, it has also been collected from South West Island.

== Biology and behaviour ==
Little is known of the biology of this species. It has been hypothesised, as a result of the discovery of a larva in the oviduct of a female moth during dissection, that this species gives birth to live young rather than laying eggs. The adults of this species are on the wing in April and May.

== Host species and habitat ==
The host species for the larvae of this moth is currently unknown however it appears that this species is associated with Kunzea ericoides.

== Conservation status ==
In 2025 this species was classified by the New Zealand Department of Conservation as "data deficient" under the New Zealand Threat Classification System. H. bilineata is regarded as being an island endemic and range restricted.
