= Hierodoris huia =

- Research grade observation of female confirmed by describer of species.

Conservation status
- Data Deficit (NZ TCS)

Scientific classification
- Kingdom: Animalia
- Phylum: Arthropoda
- Clade: Pancrustacea
- Class: Insecta
- Order: Lepidoptera
- Family: Oecophoridae
- Genus: Hierodoris
- Species: H. huia

Binomial name
- Hierodoris huia Hoare, 2005

Species of moth endemic to New Zealand

Hierodoris huia is a species of moth in the family Oecophoridae. It is endemic to New Zealand. Prior to 2025 this species was known from two sites in Titirangi that are approximately 1 to 2 km apart. The moth has since been observed in the South Wairarapa District. H. huia is suspected to be a forest canopy-dweller. Adults are on the wing in January.

Although the adult moths are attracted to light it has been hypothesised that it is a diurnal species on the basis of the behaviour the species exhibit when light trapped. The species was named in honour of the extinct bird species, the huia, as well as the type locality of Huia Road, Titirangi. In 2025 this species was classified as "data deficient" under the New Zealand Threat Classification System.

== Taxonomy and etymology ==
This species was first described by Robert R. J. Hoare in 2005. The species was first discovered by C. R. Thomas in January 1953. The holotype specimen was collected at Titirangi by P. A. Maddison on 28 January 1980. The holotype specimen is held at the New Zealand Arthropod Collection. Prior to its formal scientific description this species was referred to as Coridomorpha 'long palpi'. The epithet is in honour the extinct bird species, the huia, as well as the type locality of Huia Road, Titirangi.

== Description ==
Hierodoris huia can be identified by the minute segment 3 of the labial palp, the white subapical patch on the antenna and the metallic patches of curled scales on the forewing. These features are all unique to this species. This species is also sexually dimorphic with the female of the species having much longer labial palpi than the male.

== Distribution ==
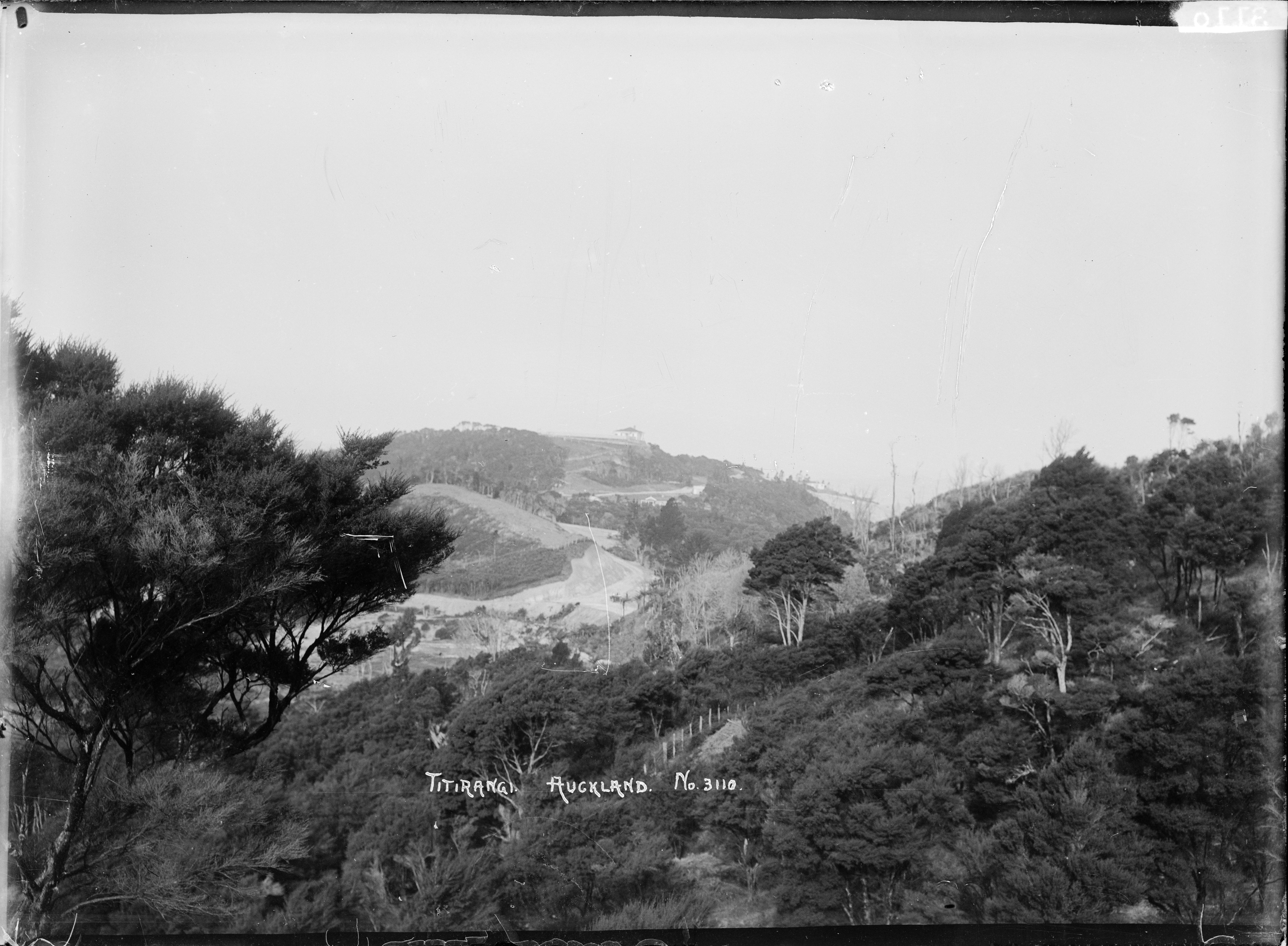
Landscape in Titirangi, holotype locality of H. huia.

This species is endemic to New Zealand. Until 2025 this species was only known from two sites in Titirangi that are approximately 1 to 2 km apart. In 2025 this species was observed in the South Wairarapa District.

== Biology and behaviour ==
Little is known of the biology of this species. Larvae have yet to be discovered. This species is on the wing in January. Although the adult moths are attracted to light it has been hypothesised that they are a diurnal species on the basis of their behaviour when light trapped.

== Host species and habitat ==
The host species for the larvae of this moth is currently unknown. Both sites where this species has been found are close to forest habitat. H. huia is suspected to be a forest canopy-dweller.

== Conservation status ==
In 2025 this species was classified by the New Zealand Department of Conservation as "data deficient" under the New Zealand Threat Classification System.
