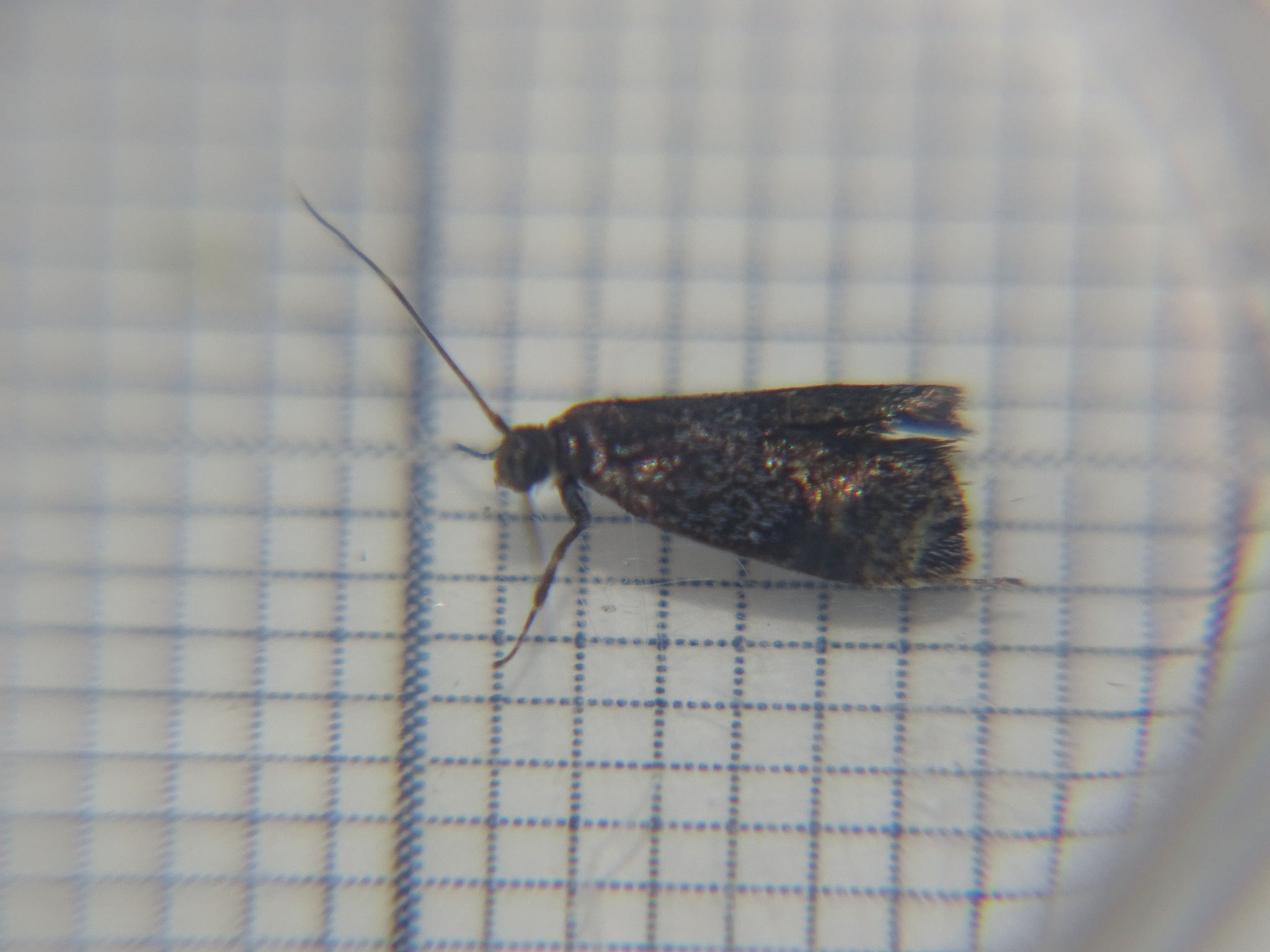

Conservation status
- Relict (NZ TCS)

Scientific classification
- Kingdom: Animalia
- Phylum: Arthropoda
- Class: Insecta
- Order: Lepidoptera
- Family: Oecophoridae
- Genus: Hierodoris
- Species: H. stella

Binomial name
- Hierodoris stella (Meyrick, 1914)

Synonyms
- Coridomorpha stella Meyrick, 1914

= Hierodoris stella =

Species of moth endemic to New Zealand

Hierodoris stella is a species of moth in the family Oecophoridae. This species is endemic to New Zealand and occurs in Auckland, Taranaki, Hawkes Bay, Bay of Plenty and Wellington. As at 2005 the larvae of this species is unknown as is its host plant. The adult moth frequents forest and are on the wing in January and February. It is classified as "At Risk, Relict'" by the Department of Conservation.

== Taxonomy ==
This species was first described by Edward Meyrick in 1914 using a specimen collected at Kauri Gully, Auckland by Stella Hudson and named Coridomorpha stella. George Hudson illustrated and discussed the species in his 1928 book The Butterflies and Moths of New Zealand. In 2005 Robert J. B. Hoare placed this species within the genus Hierodoris. The type specimen of this species is held at the Natural History Museum, London.

== Description ==
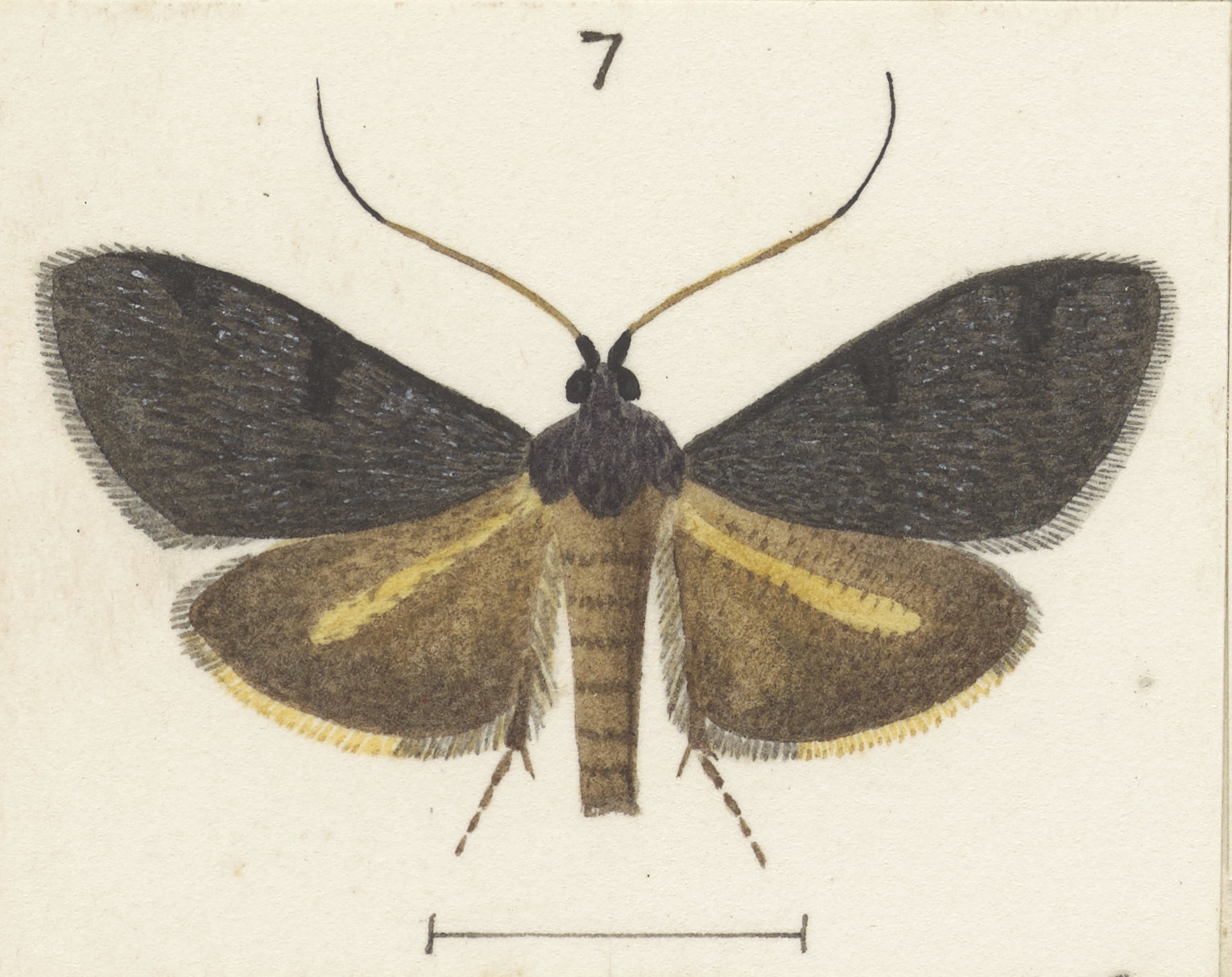
Male H. stella by George Hudson.

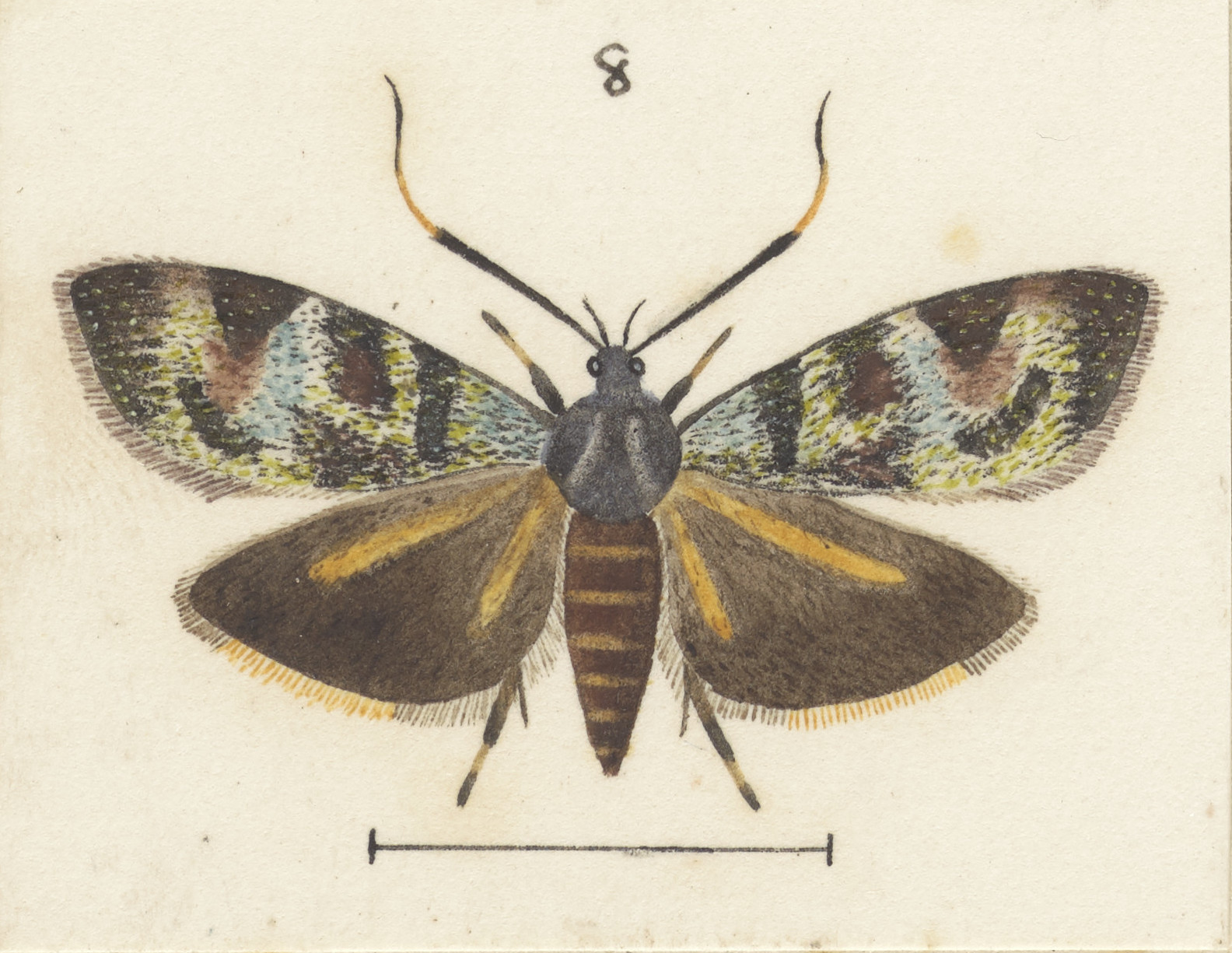
Female H. stella by George Hudson.

Meyrick described the species as follows:

♀︎. 18 mm. Head and thorax dark fuscous, with shining light-greenish reflections. Palpi dark bronzy-fuscous, suffused with ochreous-whitish towards base and apex. Antennae fuscous basal half dark purple-fuscous, above middle with a pale-ochreous band. Abdomen dark fuscous, segmental margins somewhat mixed with purple-bluish. Forewings elongate-triangular, costa anteriorly nearly straight, posteriorly gently arched, apex obtuse, termen rounded, little oblique; dark purplish-fuscous, irregularly irrorated with pale-greenish scales : cilia purplish-fuscous, towards base darker. Hindwings dark fuscous; a dull ochreous-orange streak through disc from near base to 2/3, extremity enlarged; a fine pale ochreous-orange suffused submedian streak obscurely indicated : cilia whitish-ochreous, with dark-fuscous basal line.

== Distribution ==
This species is endemic to New Zealand. It occurs in Auckland, Taranaki, Hawkes Bay, Bay of Plenty and Wellington. This species has been collected at Kauri Glen Reserve in Northcote and in Karori.

== Biology and lifecycle ==
The larvae of this species is unknown as is much of the biology of this species. The adults of this species are on the wing in January and February. George Hudson noted that the female moth appeared to mimic a bug when at rest or walking. The antennae of the moth as well as its posture when at rest makes it appear like a Romna capsoides. It has been hypothesised that this is protective mimicry for the moth as the bug it imitates has an objectionable taste and odour.

== Host species and habitat ==
The plant host species of H. stella are unknown. The adult moth frequents forest.

== Conservation status ==
This moth is classified under the New Zealand Threat Classification system as being "At Risk, Relict".
