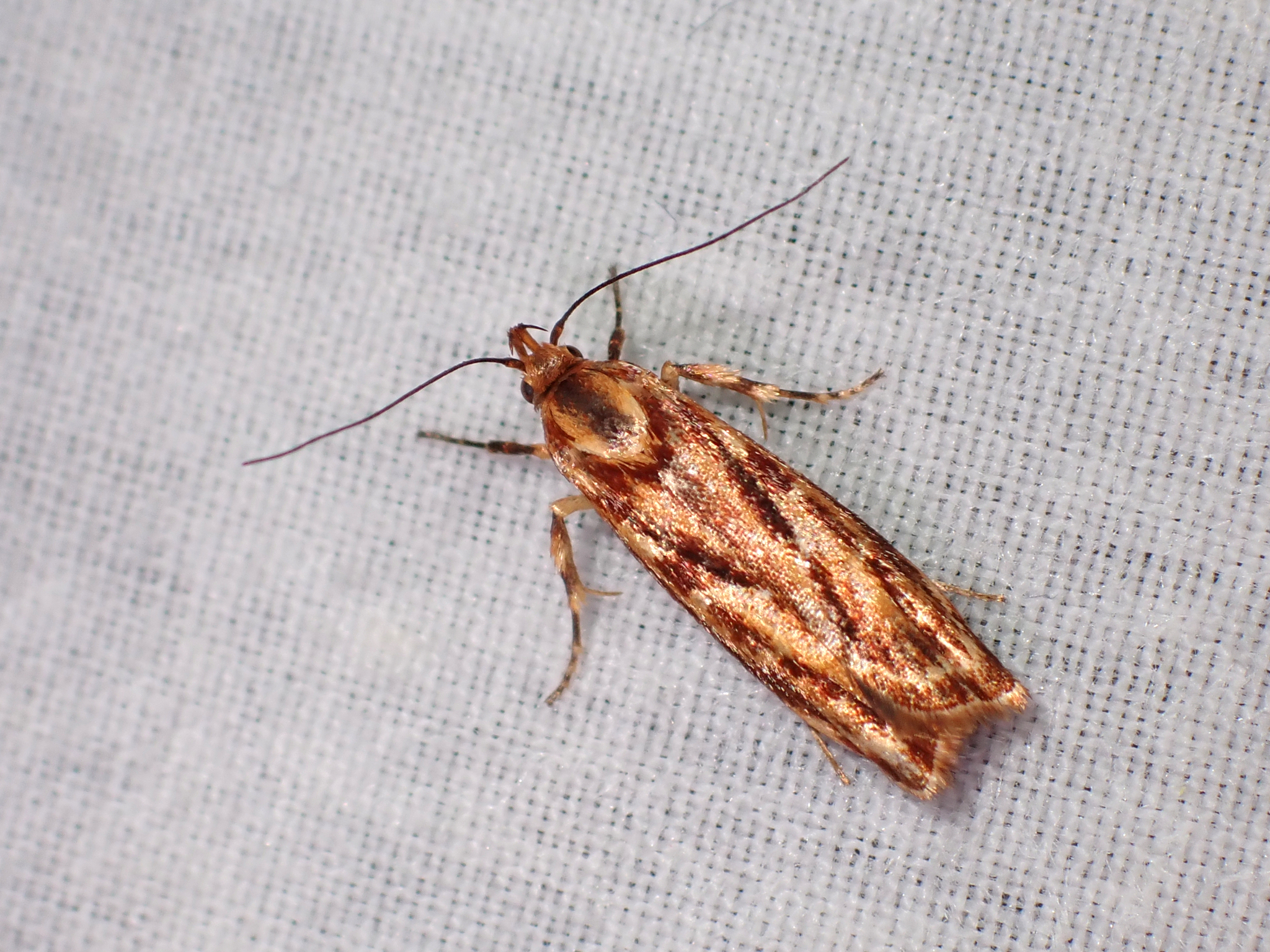

Conservation status
- Not Threatened (NZ TCS)

Scientific classification
- Kingdom: Animalia
- Phylum: Arthropoda
- Class: Insecta
- Order: Lepidoptera
- Family: Oecophoridae
- Genus: Hierodoris
- Species: H. tygris

Binomial name
- Hierodoris tygris Hoare, 2005

= Hierodoris tygris =

Species of moth

Hierodoris tygris, also known as the Titirangi Tyger, is a species of moth in the family Oecophoridae. It is endemic to New Zealand and is found in the Auckland and Wellington regions. The larvae of this species is unknown as are the larval host species. Adults have been found on the wing from December to March with one specimen collected in early May. It is a nocturnal species that is attracted to light and has been collected with the use of a mercury vapour lamp. This species is classified as "Not Threatened" by the Department of Conservation.

== Taxonomy ==
This species was first described by Robert J. B. Hoare in 2005 and named Hierodoris tygris. The holotype specimen, which was collected by Hoare at Minnehaha Ave in Titirangi on 7 January 2000, is held at the New Zealand Arthropod Collection. The species was first collected in December 1953 by C. R. Thomas. In 1971 it was again collected by M. J. Meads at the Ōrongorongo Research Station but was misidentified.

== Description ==
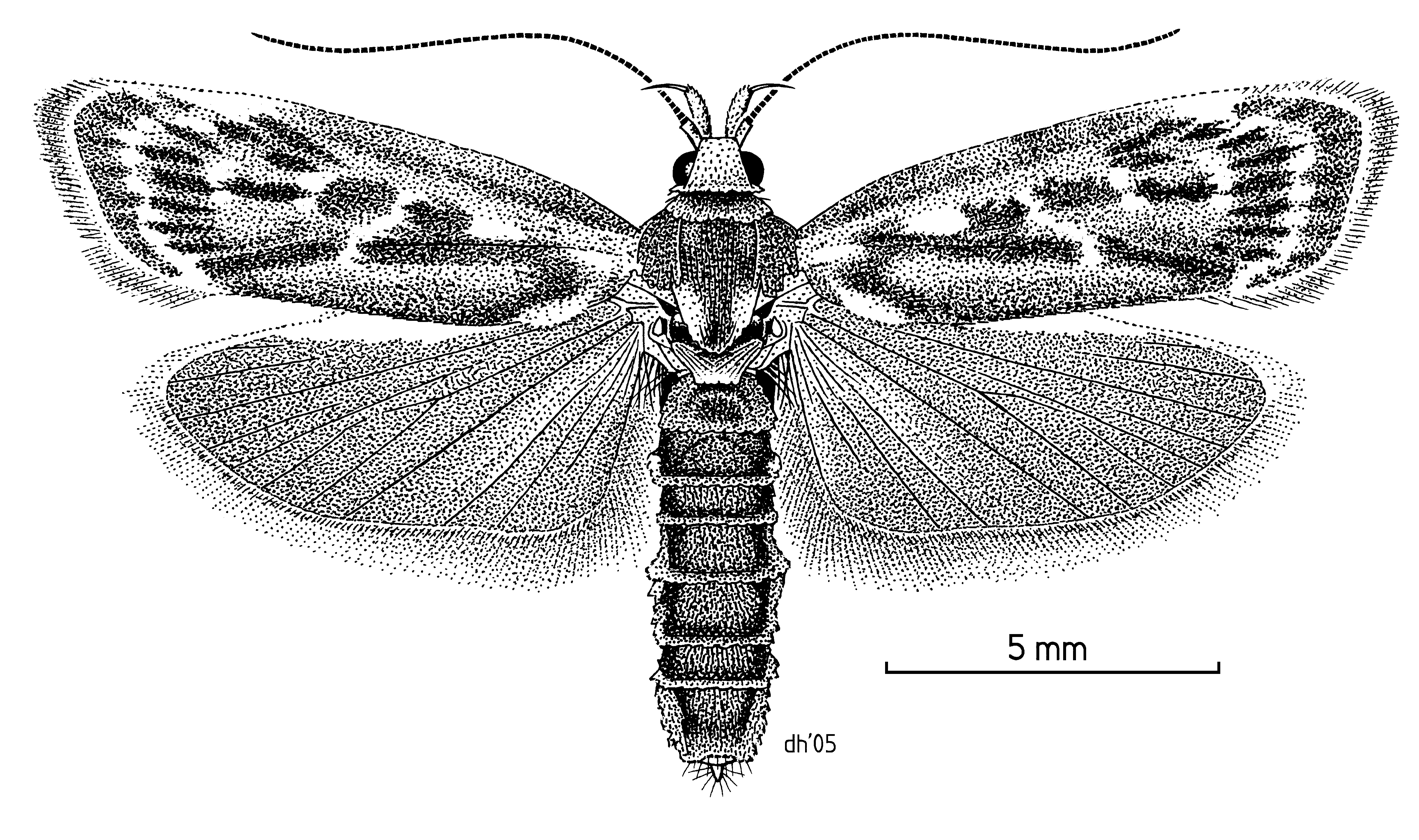
Illustration of H. tygris.

The wingspan of the male of the species is between 16 and 18 mm (0.63 and 0.71 in) and the female is between 17 and 22 mm (0.67 and 0.87 in). This species has a unique striped coloration to its forewings and this ferruginous colour and pattern, along with the lack of ocellus, are diagnostic for the identification of the species.

== Distribution ==
This species is endemic to New Zealand. It can only be found in the Auckland and Wellington regions. Other than the type locality of Titirangi, this species has been collected at Clevedon, at Murphy's Bush in Flat Bush, at Cascades Park in the Waitākere Ranges, and in the Ōrongorongo Valley in Wellington.

== Biology and behaviour ==
Little is known of the biology of H. tygris. The larvae of this species is unknown. It has been hypothesised that the larvae of H. tygris are canopy feeders. The species has been found on the wing from December to March with one specimen collected in early May. It is a nocturnal species that is attracted to light and has been collected with the use of a mercury vapour lamp.

== Host species and habitat ==
The host species for the larvae of H. tygis is unknown. It has been hypothesised that the host species is Dacrydium cupressinum (rimu).

== Conservation status ==
This species has been classified as having the "Not Threatened" conservation status under the New Zealand Threat Classification System.
