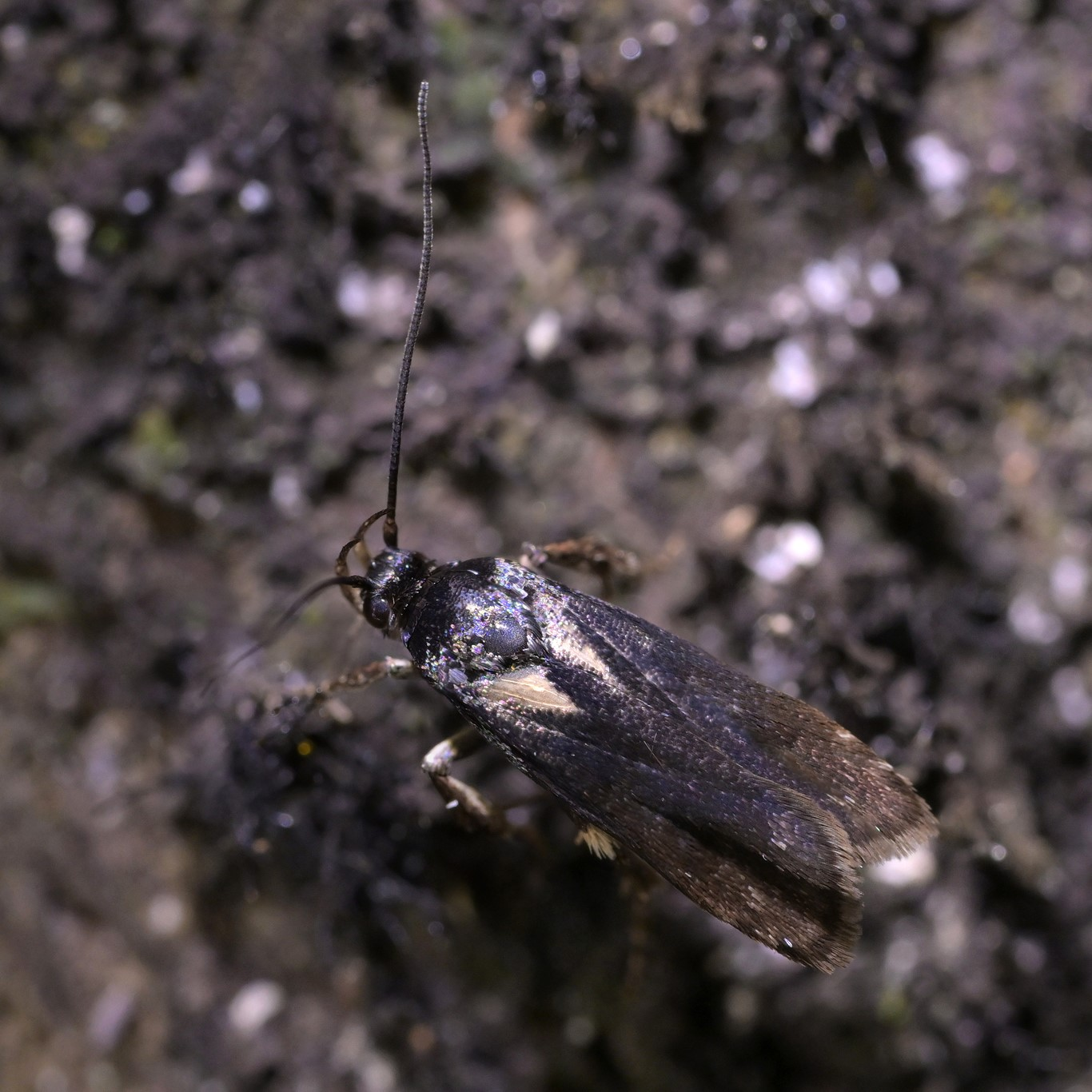

Conservation status
- Data Deficit (NZ TCS)

Scientific classification
- Kingdom: Animalia
- Phylum: Arthropoda
- Clade: Pancrustacea
- Class: Insecta
- Order: Lepidoptera
- Family: Oecophoridae
- Genus: Hierodoris
- Species: H. sesioides

Binomial name
- Hierodoris sesioides Hoare, 2005

= Hierodoris sesioides =

Species of moth, endemic to New Zealand

Hierodoris sesioides is a species of moth in the family Oecophoridae. This species was first described by Robert R. J. Hoare in 2005. It is endemic to New Zealand and is known from its type locality of the Esk State Forest in the Hawke's Bay as well as near Alfredton in the Manawatū-Whanganui region. The larval host species is Spohora tetraptera, a kōwhai species. Larvae feed internally in woody galls on the stems of this plant. This species is classified as "Data Deficient" by the Department of Conservation.

== Taxonomy and etymology ==
This species was first described by Robert R. J. Hoare in 2005. The male holotype was reared from larvae collected in Esk State Forest on the 4 March 1964 by H. Auld. Prior to its formal description, this species as known as Hierodoris 'clear wing'. The holotype specimen is held at the New Zealand Arthropod Collection. The epithet comes from Sesia, a genus of clearwing moths, and the Greek word 'eides' meaning likeness. It refers to the resemblance of this species to a sesiid.

== Description ==
Hierodoris sesioides has a very narrow forewing and a semi-transparent white hindwing, with a well-defined black border.

== Distribution ==
This species is endemic to New Zealand. Prior to 2024 this species was only known from the type locality in Hawkes Bay. In 2024 this species was observed near Alfredton in the Manawatū-Whanganui region.

== Biology and behaviour ==
Little is known of the biology of this species.

== Host species and habitat ==
The host species for the larvae of this moth is the kowhai tree, Sophora tetraptera. The larvae feed internally in woody galls on stems of their host tree.

== Conservation status ==
In 2025 this species was classified by the New Zealand Department of Conservation as "data deficient" under the New Zealand Threat Classification System.
