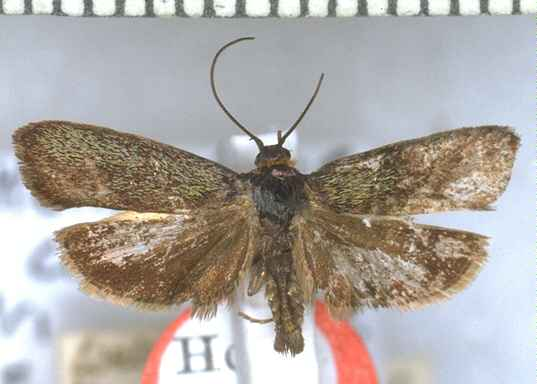
- Holotype

Scientific classification
- Kingdom: Animalia
- Phylum: Arthropoda
- Class: Insecta
- Order: Lepidoptera
- Family: Oecophoridae
- Genus: Hierodoris
- Species: H. callispora

Binomial name
- Hierodoris callispora (Meyrick, 1912)

Synonyms
- Heliostibes callispora Meyrick, 1912

= Hierodoris callispora =

Species of moth endemic to New Zealand

Hierodoris callispora is a moth of the family Oecophoridae. It is endemic to New Zealand and can be found throughout the country from south of the Bay of Plenty. This species inhabits native beech forest. Adults of the species have been found where Muehlenbeckia is common. Adults have also been collected from the flowers of Kunzea ericoides. However the larval host is unconfirmed although it has been hypothesised that larvae of this species feed on Kunzea ericoides flowers. Adults of this species can be distinguished by its orange ruff that contrasts with its dark head and thorax. There is a colour form that exists that has orange scales and an orange coloured fringe on the hindwing. Adults have been collected in December and January and are day flying but are also attracted to light at night. A female specimen has been found with a larva in her oviduct suggesting that this species may give birth to larval young.

== Taxonomy ==
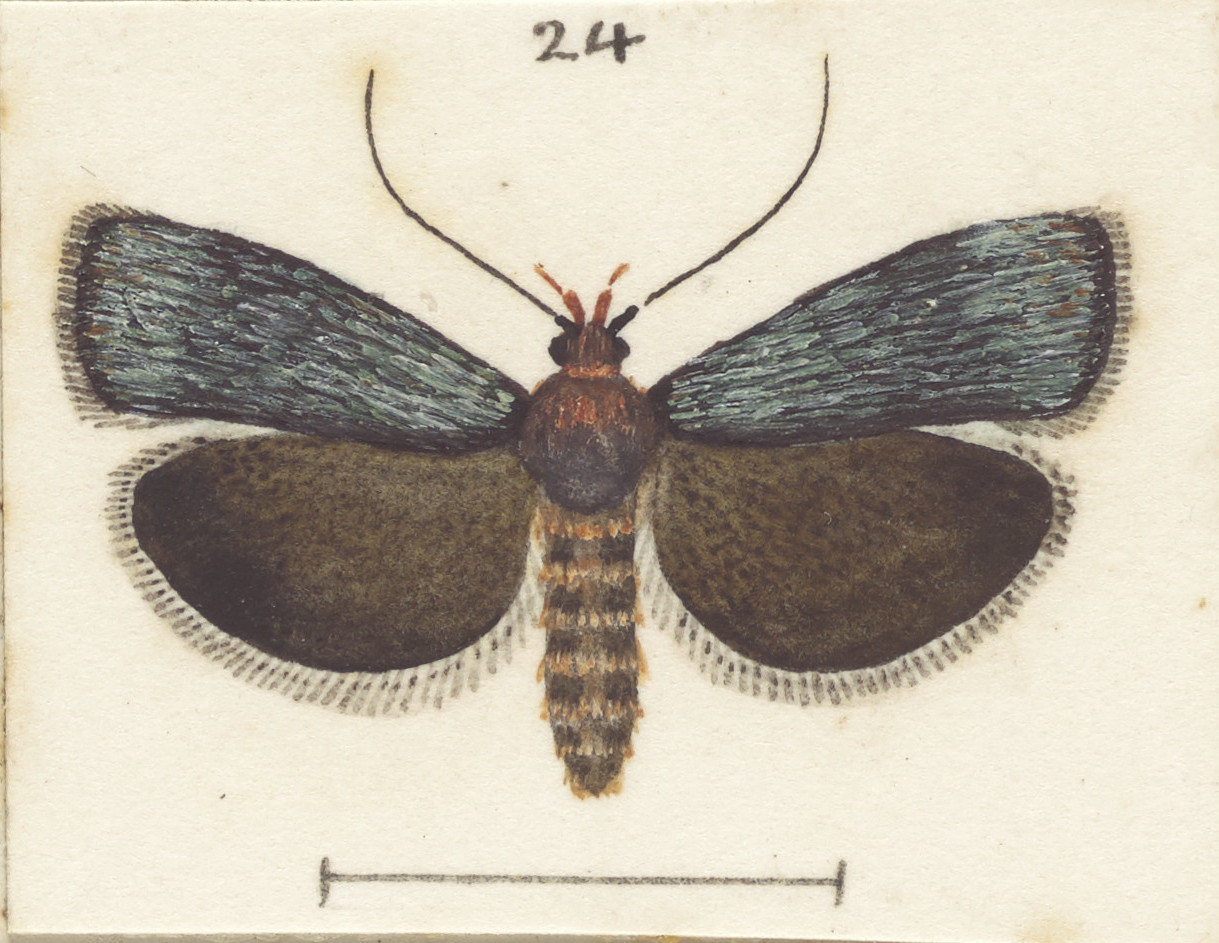
H. callispora illustrated by George Hudson

This species was first described by Edward Meyrick in 1912 and named Heliostibes callispora using a specimen collected in January by George Hudson in Wellington. In 1988 J. S. Dugdale placed this species within the genus Hierodoris. The holotype specimen is held at the Natural History Museum, London.

== Description ==
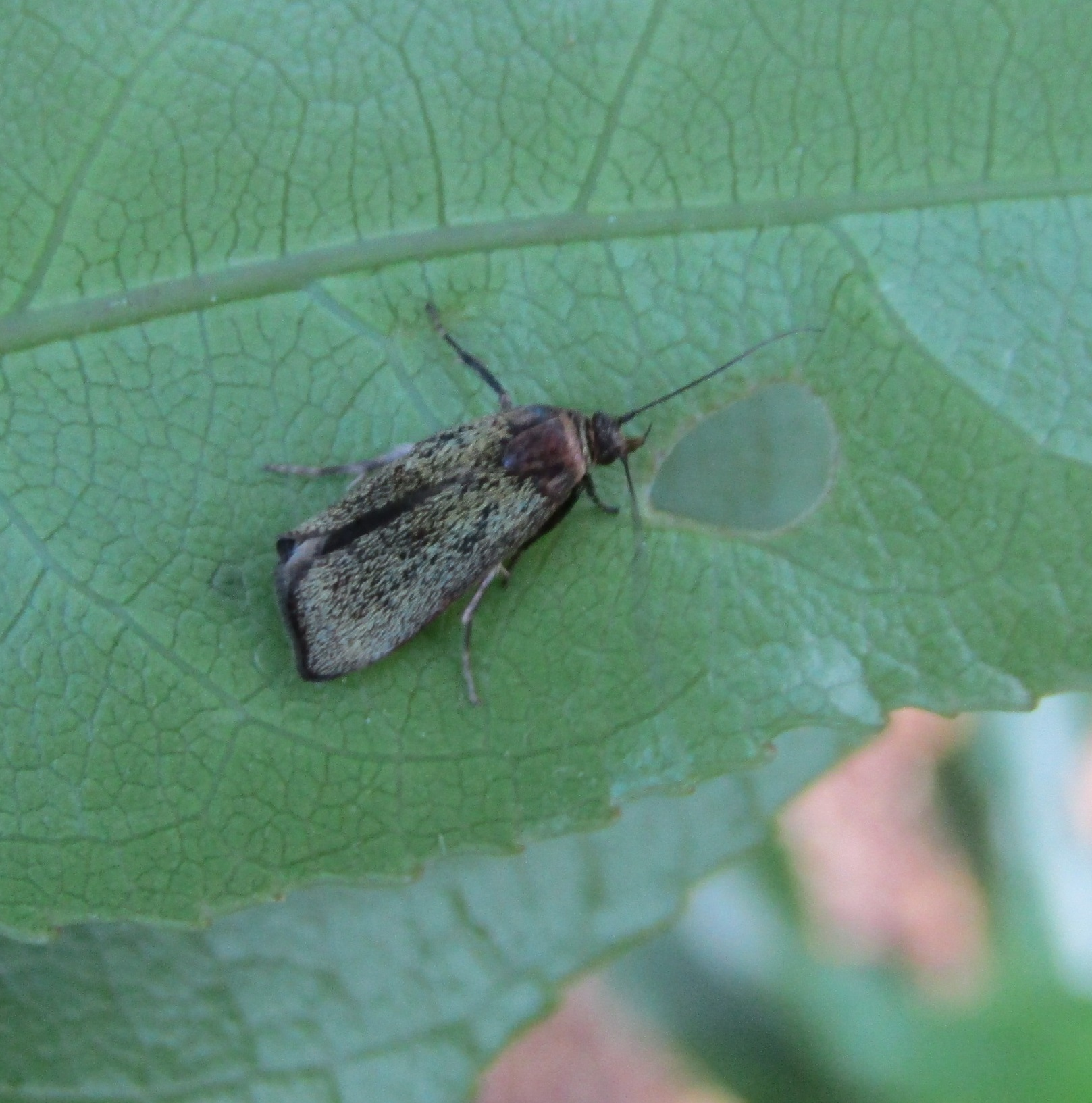
Hierodoris callispora observation

Meyrick described this species as follows:

♂. 17 mm. Head deep metallic-green, with purple reflections, collar ferruginous-orange. Palpi ferruginous-orange, terminal joint rather more than half second, blackish anteriorly. Antennae dark fuscous, ciliations 1/3. Thorax shining deep greenish-purple-bronze. Abdomen dark fuscous. Forewings elongate, posteriorly dilated, costa slightly arched, faintly sinuate in middle, apex obtuse, termen straight, little oblique, rounded beneath; dark indigo-fuscous, closely strewn with pale greenish-yellowish hair-scales : cilia fuscous, basal third dark fuscous mixed with deep ferruginous. Hindwings blackish; cilia fuscous, with blackish basal shade.

This species can be distinguished by its orange ruff that contrasts with its dark head and thorax. There is a colour form that exists that has orange scales and an orange coloured fringe on the hindwing.

== Distribution ==
This species is endemic to New Zealand and can be found throughout the country from south of the Bay of Plenty.

== Behaviour and biology ==
Adults of this species have been collected in December and January and are day flying but are also attracted to light at night. A female specimen has been found with a larva in her oviduct suggesting that this species may give birth to larval young.

== Habitat ==
This species inhabits native beech forest. Hudson states that adults of the species have been found where Muehlenbeckia is common. The larval host is unconfirmed although adults of this species have been collected from the flowers of Kunzea ericoides. It has been hypothesised that larvae of this species feed on those flowers.
