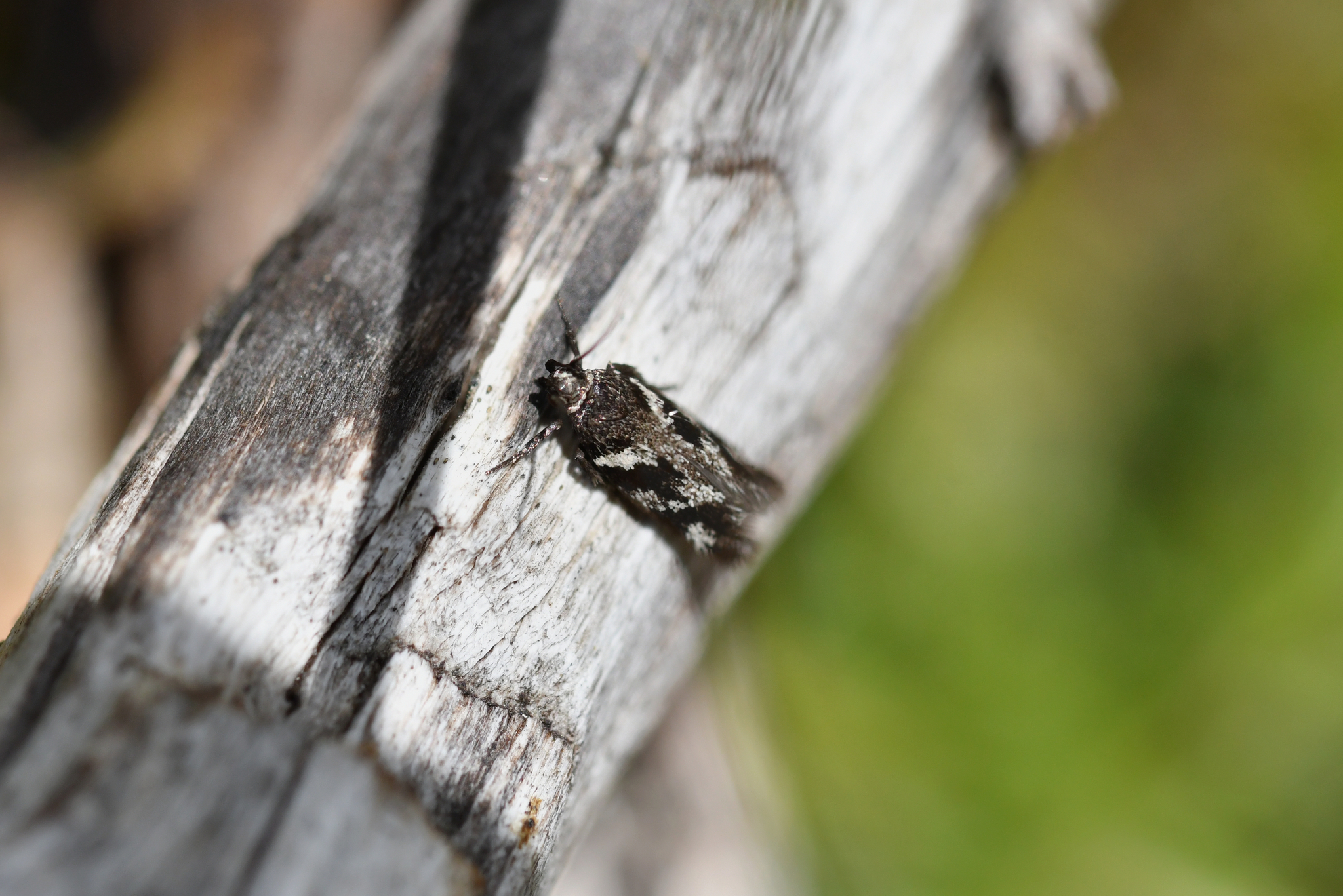

Scientific classification
- Kingdom: Animalia
- Phylum: Arthropoda
- Clade: Pancrustacea
- Class: Insecta
- Order: Lepidoptera
- Family: Oecophoridae
- Genus: Hierodoris
- Species: H. insignis

Binomial name
- Hierodoris insignis Philpott, 1926

= Hierodoris insignis =

Species of moth endemic to New Zealand

Hierodoris insignis is a species of moth in the family Gelechiidae. It is endemic to New Zealand and has been observed in the South Island. Adults are on the wing in January. The larvae are leaf miners and are hosted by Celmisia species. It is likely that this species belongs to another genus and as such this species is also known as Hierodoris (s.l.) insignis or 'Hierodoris' insignis. In 2025 this species was classified as "data deficient" under the New Zealand Threat Classification System.

== Taxonomy ==
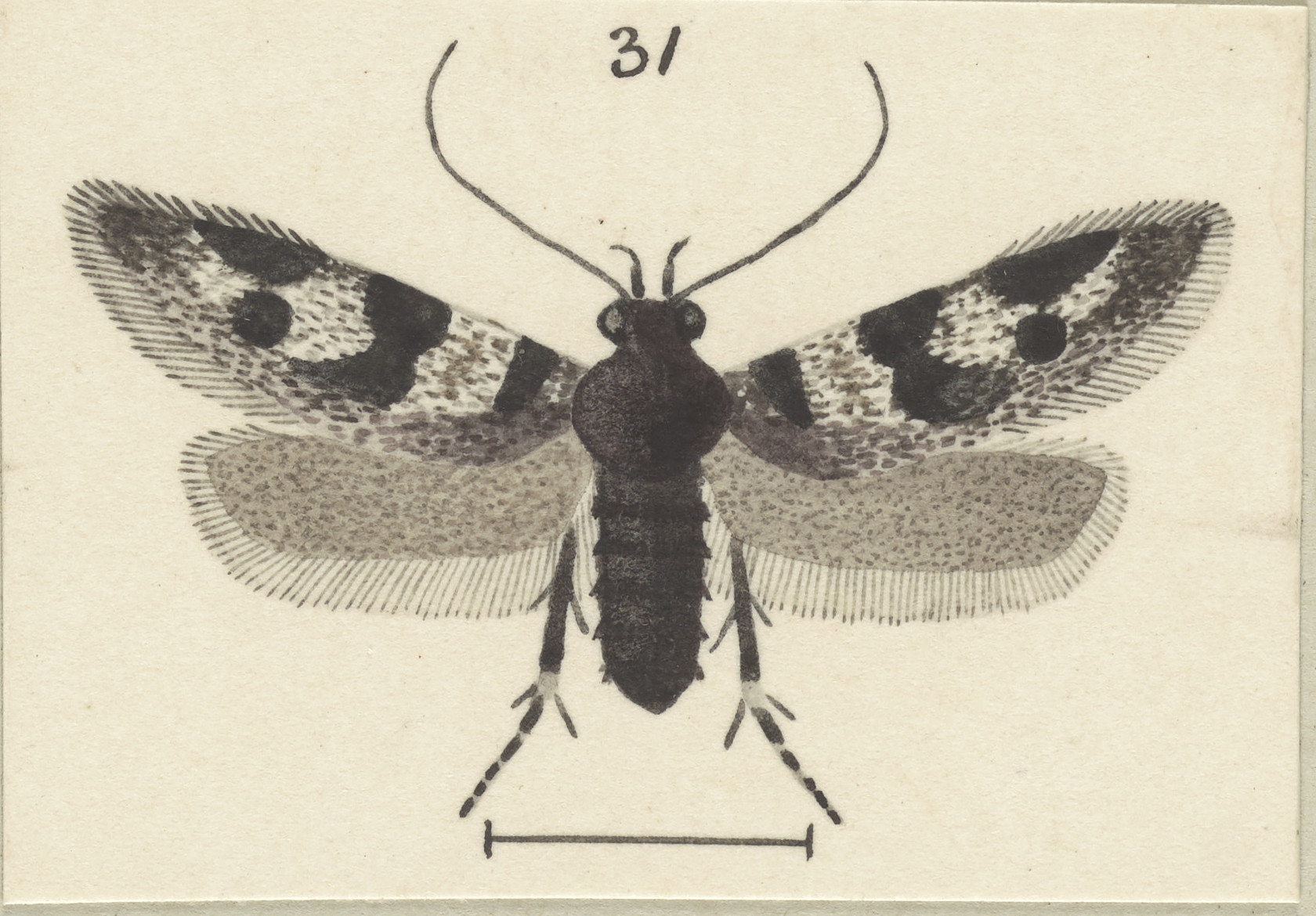
H. insignis illustrated by George Hudson, c. 1927

This species was first described by Alfred Philpott in 1926 under the name Hierodoris ? insignis. He placed the species within the genus Hierodoris provisionally but stated that further material was needed to fix the genus with certainty. In 1988 J. S. Dugdale placed this species within the family Gelechiidae. In 2005 Robert Hoare commented that H. insignis is completely unrelated to the genus it is currently placed in, that is Hierodoris. As a result of this disputed placement this species is also known as Hierodoris (s.l.) insignis or 'Hierodoris' insignis. As at 2025 this species is regarded as being taxonomically unresolved.

The male holotype specimen, collected by S. Lindsay at an altitude of 4000 ft on the Mount Arthur tableland, is held in the Canterbury Museum.

== Description ==
Philpott described this species as follows:

♀. 12 mm. Head and thorax dark bronzy-purplish-fuscous. Palpi and antennae dark brownish-fuscous. Abdomen dark purplish-brown. Legs dark fuscous, tibiae and tarsi obscurely annulated with greyish-white. Forewings moderate, costa slightly arched, apex rounded, termen extremely oblique; white, densely irrorated with leaden-grey; along dorsum wholly leaden-grey; markings purplish-black; a nearly straight, broad, subbasal fascia, an outwardly-oblique, broad, irregular fascia from costa at ⅓, reaching to fold; a large round spot in disc at ⅔, almost touching a semi-oval spot on costa; a fuscous suffusion along termen: fringes fuscous-grey with some white scales. Hindwings under 1, trapezoidal; purplish-fuscous: fringes fuscous.

== Distribution ==
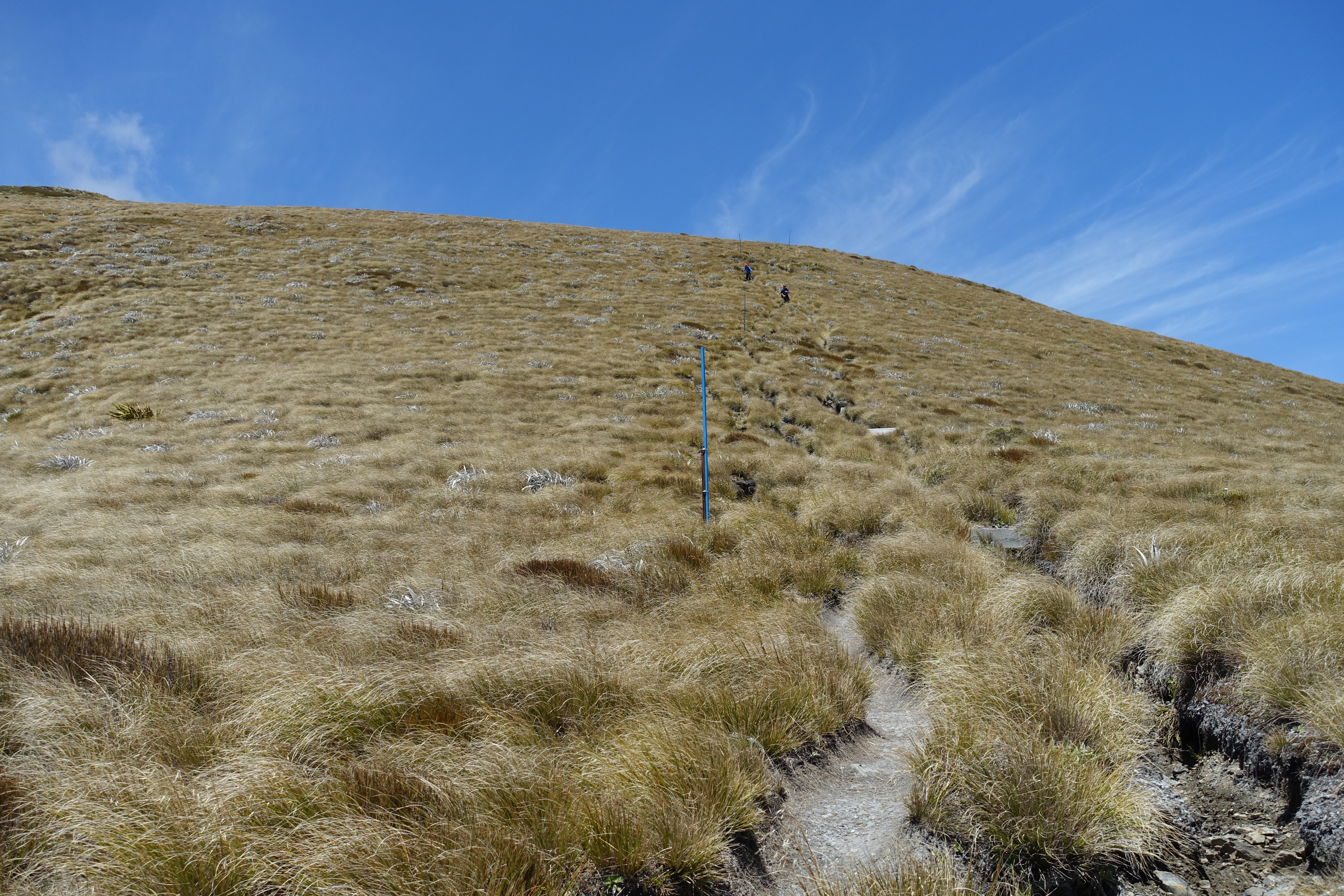
Mount Arthur, the type locality of this species.

This species is endemic to New Zealand. It has been observed in the South Island including in the Nelson/Tasman districts, in the Hunter Mountains and near Te Anau in Southland.

== Behaviour ==
The adults of this species are on the wing in January.

== Habitat and hosts ==
The larvae of this species is a leaf miner. It mines the tomentum underneath the leaves of Celmisia species.

== Conservation status ==
In 2025 this species was classified by the New Zealand Department of Conservation as "data deficient" under the New Zealand Threat Classification System.
