= Mount Titiroa =

Mountain in New Zealand

Mt Titiroa
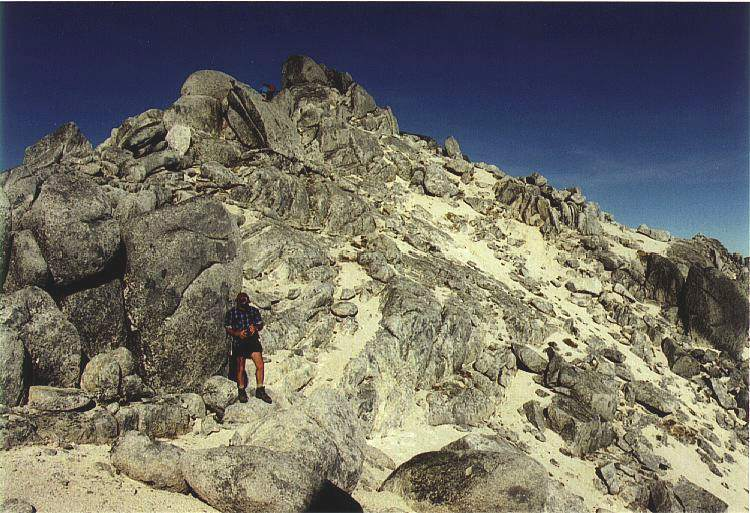
- Summit of Mount Titiroa

Highest point
- Elevation: 1,715 m (5,627 ft)
- Coordinates: 45°39′S 167°30′E

Geography
- Location: South Island, New Zealand
- Topo map: 260-C44

Climbing
- Easiest route: North Branch Borland Hut

Mt Titiroa is a prominent landmark of the Te Anau Basin area of northern Southland on the eastern flank of Fiordland National Park. It is known for its white granite rock, which gives its summit the appearance of lingering snow even throughout the summer months, and is clearly visible from Te Anau township.

The mountain summit area is known as Geiger's Garden, and sports a number of oddly shaped boulders caused by exfoliation of the granite rocks. These are popular with photographers and mountaineers.

In the 1990s, the Havoc and Newsboy television series did a spoof episode on Mount Titiroa looking for a lost civilization, in which they sat astride a rock outcrop shaped like a giant stone turtle. Shortly after the TV broadcast the New Zealand Department of Conservation announced that no commercial guides would be allowed to take people into the Mount Titiroa area.
