= Hierodoris gerontion =

Conservation status
- Nationally Critical (NZ TCS)

Scientific classification
- Kingdom: Animalia
- Phylum: Arthropoda
- Clade: Pancrustacea
- Class: Insecta
- Order: Lepidoptera
- Family: Oecophoridae
- Genus: Hierodoris
- Species: H. gerontion

Binomial name
- Hierodoris gerontion Hoare, 2005

Species of moth endemic to New Zealand

Hierodoris gerontion is a moth of the family Oecophoridae. It is endemic to New Zealand and is found in the alpine zones of the mountain ranges in Central Otago. This species prefers habitat near seepages and is also common in fellfields. H. gerontion is variable in appearance with the hindwings varying in appearance from white to a darkened brownish shade. It can be distinguished from other species in the Hierodoris genus as on the second segment of the labial palpi it has sub-erect scales giving the appearance of a shaggy beard. The larvae of this species has yet to be described. In 2025 this species was classified as "nationally critical" under the New Zealand Threat Classification System by the Department of Conservation as it is impacted by climate change and is in need of conservation research as it is data poor.

== Taxonomy ==
This species was first described by Robert Hoare in 2005 from specimens collected in Central Otago. The male holotype specimen, collected at the Old Man Range / Kopuwai at 1640 m, is held at the New Zealand Arthropod Collection.

== Description ==
H. gerontion is variable in appearance but the wingspan of an adult is between 14.5 and 17.5 mm. The hindwings can vary in appearance from white to a darkened brownish shade. It can be distinguished from other species in the Hierodoris genus as on the second segment of the labial palpi it has sub-erect scales giving the appearance of a shaggy beard. The larvae of this species has yet to be described.

== Distribution ==
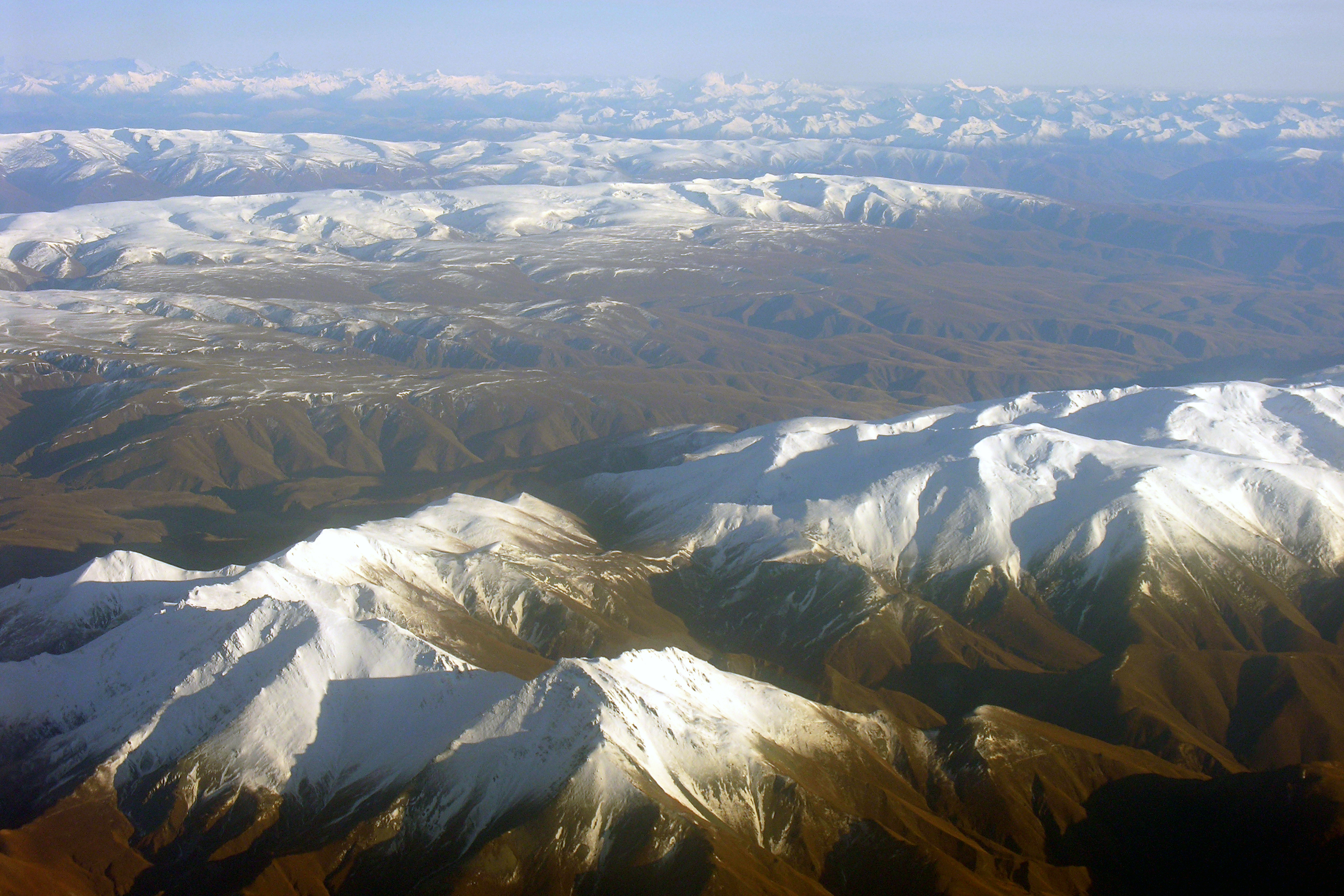
Mountains of Central Otago, habitat of H. gerontion.

This species is endemic to New Zealand and is found in the alpine zones of the mountain ranges in Central Otago. Although originally this species was said to be present in eastern Fiordland this locality information was based on an incorrect identification of a male specimen of H. extensilis.

== Habitat and hosts ==
This species prefers habitat near seepages and is also common in fellfields. As at 2005 the larval host is unknown but it has been hypothesised that the larval hosts may be herbaceous plant foliage.

== Conservation status ==
In 2025 this species was classified as "Nationally Critical" with the report stating that this species is impacted by climate change and is in need of conservation research as the species has a lack of data on both the population size as well as how the population is changing over time.
