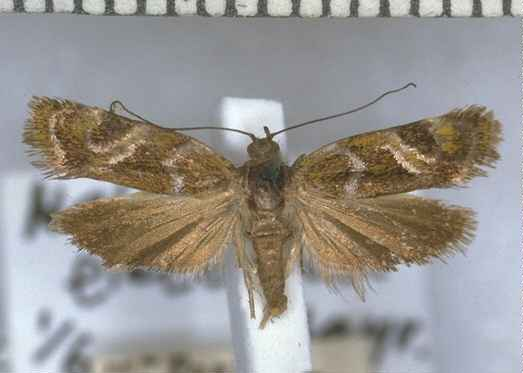
- Female lectotype

Conservation status
- Data Deficit (NZ TCS)

Scientific classification
- Kingdom: Animalia
- Phylum: Arthropoda
- Clade: Pancrustacea
- Class: Insecta
- Order: Lepidoptera
- Family: Oecophoridae
- Genus: Hierodoris
- Species: H. electrica

Binomial name
- Hierodoris electrica (Meyrick, 1889)

Synonyms
- Heliostibes electrica Meyrick, 1889

= Hierodoris electrica =

Species of moth endemic to New Zealand

Hierodoris electrica is a moth of the family Oecophoridae. It was first described by Edward Meyrick in 1889. It is endemic to New Zealand, where it has been reported from the northern and southern parts of the South Island. Adults are day flying and are on the wing from December until February. The larva of H. electrica has yet to be described however a known larval host of this species is Olearia nummulariifolia. In 2025 this species was classified as "data deficient" under the New Zealand Threat Classification System.

== Taxonomy ==
This species was first described by Edward Meyrick in 1889 and named Heliostibes electrica using two specimens collected at Mount Arthur at an altitude of 4700 ft. In 1988 J. S. Dugdale moved this species to the genus Hierodoris. The female lectotype specimen, designated by Robert Hoare in 2005, is held at the Natural History Museum, London.

== Description ==
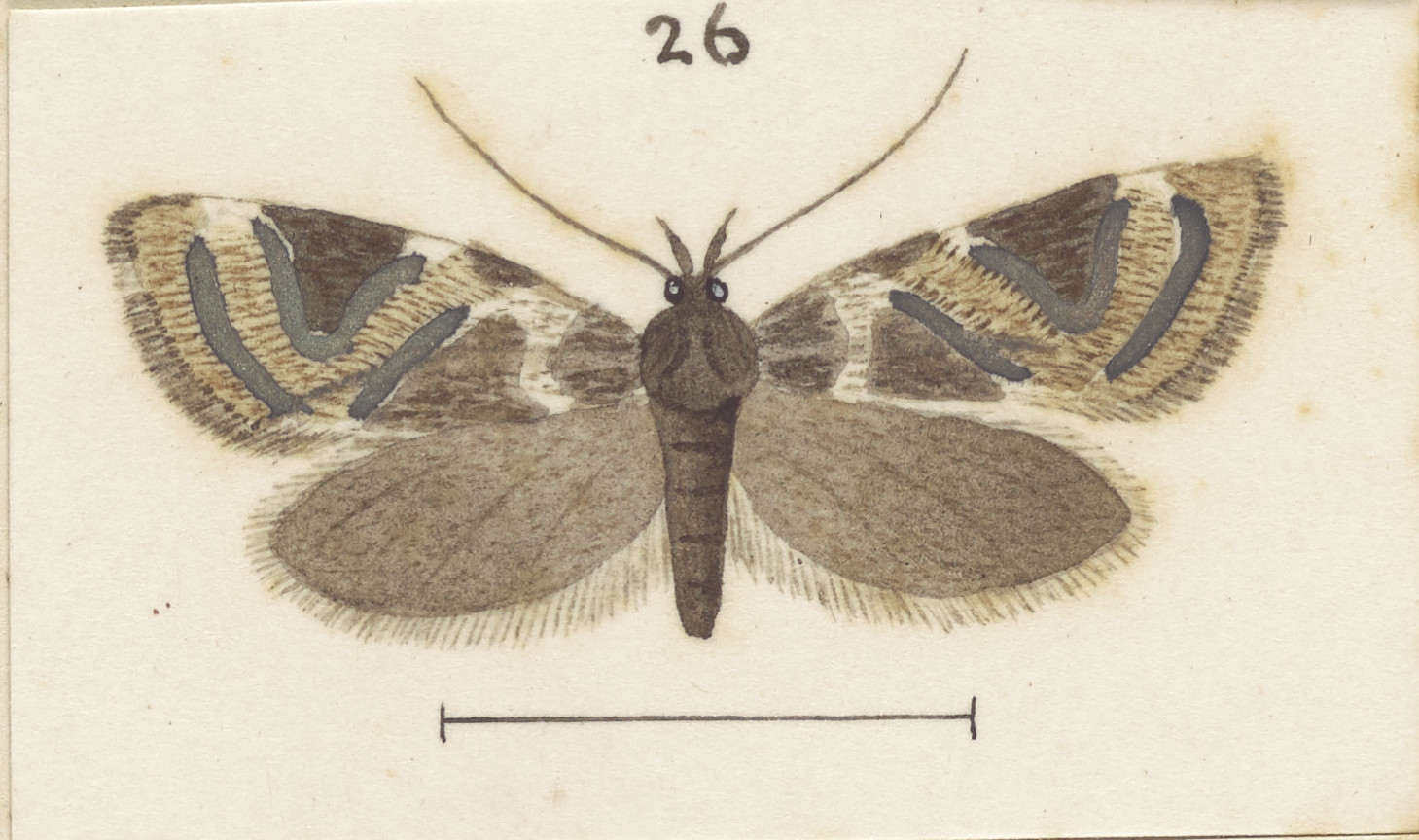
H. electrica illustrated by Hudson.

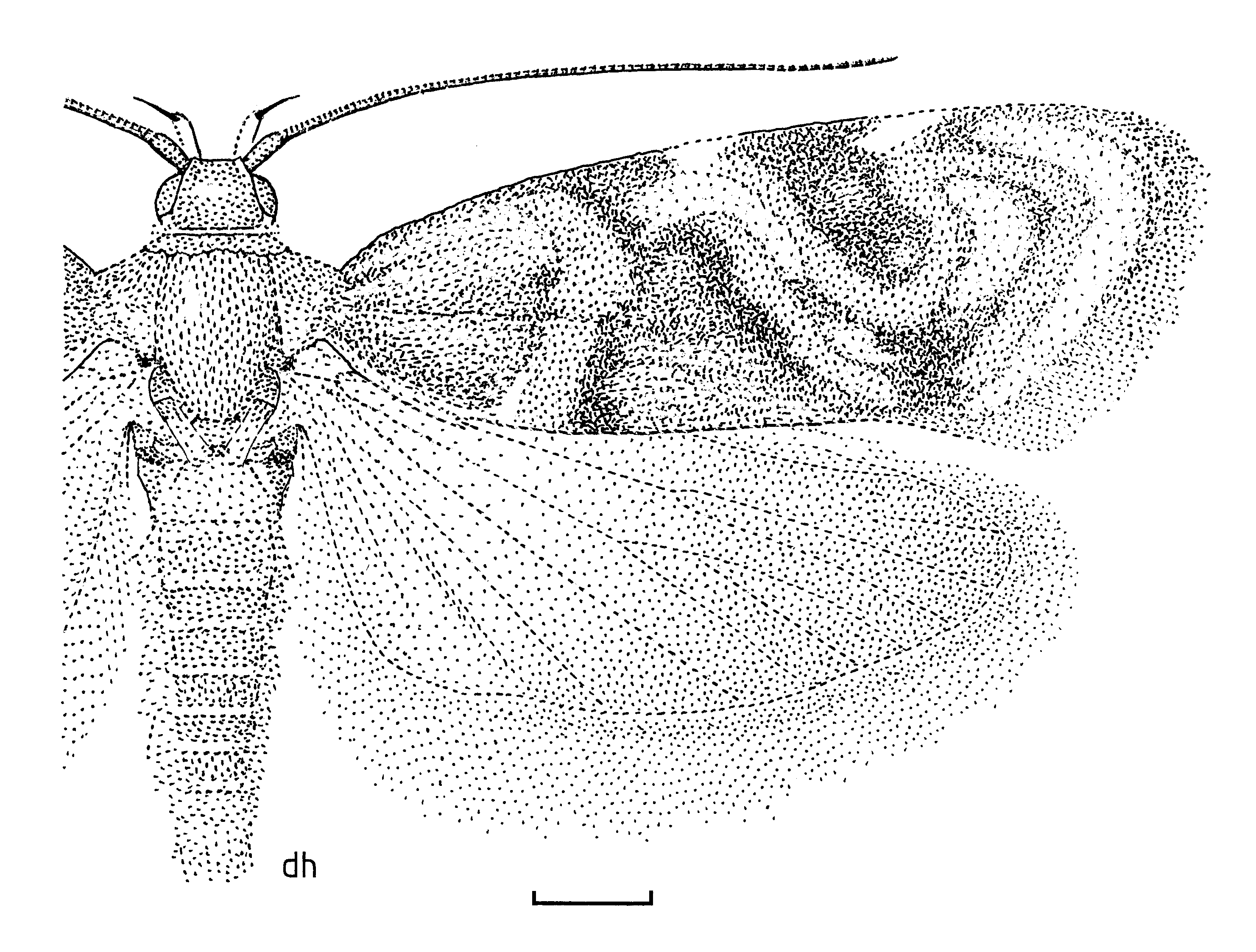
Illustration by Des Helmore.

Meyrick described the adults of this species as follows:

♀. 16–17mm. Head, palpi, thorax, and abdomen dark fuscous, slightly sprinkled with yellowish. Antennae and legs dark fuscous, posterior tibiae yellow-whitish. Forewings elongate, moderate, costa gently arched, apex rounded, hind-margin obliquely rounded; dark fuscous, strewn with ochreous-yellow hair-scales in irregular patches; a leaden-metallic line from 1/3 of costa to 2/5 of inner margin, angulated outwards in middle; a sinuate leaden-metallic line from above middle of disc to anal angle; a leaden-metallic line from middle of costa-obliquely outwards more than half across wing, thence curved round to touch a whitish dot on costa at 3/4, and continued in a strong curve near and parallel to costa and hindmargins to anal angle; space between first and second lines, and within first curve of third line, less strewn with yellow scales and therefore darker than rest of wing: cilia light grey, rather shining. Hindwings rather dark fuscous, somewhat bronzy; cilia light shining grey.

The wingspan of the adults is between 15 and 16.5 mm. The ground colour of the forewings is dark brown, with narrow yellow scales overlaying this base colour. The hind wings are brown.

== Distribution ==
This species is endemic to New Zealand and has been found in the northern and southern areas of the South Island. However this species has not been collected in Buller, Westland, or Canterbury.

== Behaviour ==
Adults of this species are on the wing from mid December until the end of February. This moth is day flying and has been seen on hot, sunny days. It was regarded by George Hudson as being rare and Robert Hoare states it appears to be rarer than its sister species H. s-fractum.

== Hosts ==
The larvae possibly feed on Ozothamnus species. However, reared specimens have also emerged from a spinning on Olearia nummulariifolia.

== Conservation status ==
In 2025 this species was classified by the New Zealand Department of Conservation as "data deficient" under the New Zealand Threat Classification System as a result of the difficulty in identifying the species.
