= Herbfield =

Forb- and grass-rich plant community often found in subpolar ecosystems

Herbfields are plant communities dominated by herbaceous plants, especially forbs and grasses. They are found where climatic conditions do not allow large woody plants to grow, such as in subantarctic and alpine tundra environments. Herbfield is defined in New South Wales (Australia) government legislation as native vegetation that predominantly does not contain an over-storey or a mid-storey and where ground cover is dominated by non-grass species. The New Zealand Department of Conservation has described herbfield vegetation as that in which the cover of herbs in the canopy is 20–100%, and in which herb cover is greater than that of any other growth form, or of bare ground.

Various kinds of herbfield include:

- Tall alpine herbfield
- Short alpine herbfield
- Tussock herbfield
- Wet herbfield
- Aquatic herbfield
- Gravelly pavement herbfield

Tall alpine herbfields flourish on slopes over 1500 meters in altitude. Short alpine herbfields can also be found above 1500 meters, but they are limited to depositional zones where soil and debris collect. They're found in less rocky areas with less water, and they exist below major snow patches. Wet herbfields differ from the tall and short alpine herbfields because they have poorer drainage (so more saturated soil), but they can be found in high altitudes like the tall and short alpine herbfields.

Also called "Tussock Grasslands", Tussock herbfields are mainly found in the South island of New Zealand, but they are also found central in the North Island. These herbfields are named after the type of grass "Tussock". which include the plant groups Chionochloa, Carex, Festuca, and Poa. Large Tussock plants are also called snow grass and snow tussocks, growing up to 2 meters tall.

Some herbfields can found on the shallow shorelines of lakes, between the aquatic vegetation and taller shrublands (A threatened habitat in Auckland, New Zealand).

Gravelly pavement herbfields are ecosystems which rely on groundwater and exist in South-Eastern Australia. These herbfields are better suited to mountainous regions. Vegetation is sparse and semi-aquatic. Vegetation is attached to rock due to a lack of soil. Water composition also changes in the ecosystem as water moves through the herbfield, moving from CO2 enriched to a more equilibrated state (as CO2 is evaded).
