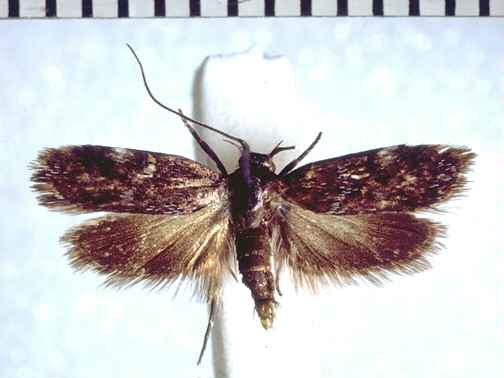
- Holotype specimen

Scientific classification
- Kingdom: Animalia
- Phylum: Arthropoda
- Class: Insecta
- Order: Lepidoptera
- Family: Oecophoridae
- Genus: Hierodoris
- Species: H. frigida

Binomial name
- Hierodoris frigida Philpott, 1923

Synonyms
- Taoscelis crocostoma Meyrick, 1938

= Hierodoris frigida =

Species of moth endemic to New Zealand

Hierodoris frigida is a moth of the family Oecophoridae. It is endemic to New Zealand and is only found in the South Island. This species is found in two parts of that island, the Nelson/Tasman area and the Mackenzie, Otago and Dunedin areas in the southern part of the island. Although similar to H. iophanes this species can be distinguished as H. frigida has white bands on its forewings and the metallic coloured areas differ in placement. Segment 2 on the labial palp is entirely yellow and enables this species to be distinguished from the similar appearing species H. polita and H. torrida. Larvae have been collected amongst leaf litter from beneath species within the genus Thymus. It prefers open and shrubland habitats and adult moths have been observed flying close to the soil underneath Leptospermum scrub.

== Taxonomy ==
This species was described by Alfred Philpott in 1923 using specimens collected by Philpott in January on Dun Mountain in Nelson at around 3000 ft. In 1988 J. S. Dugdale synonymised Taoscelis crocostoma with H. frigida. This synonym was confirmed by Robert Hoare in 2005. The male holotype specimen of H. frigida is held in the New Zealand Arthropod Collection.

== Description ==
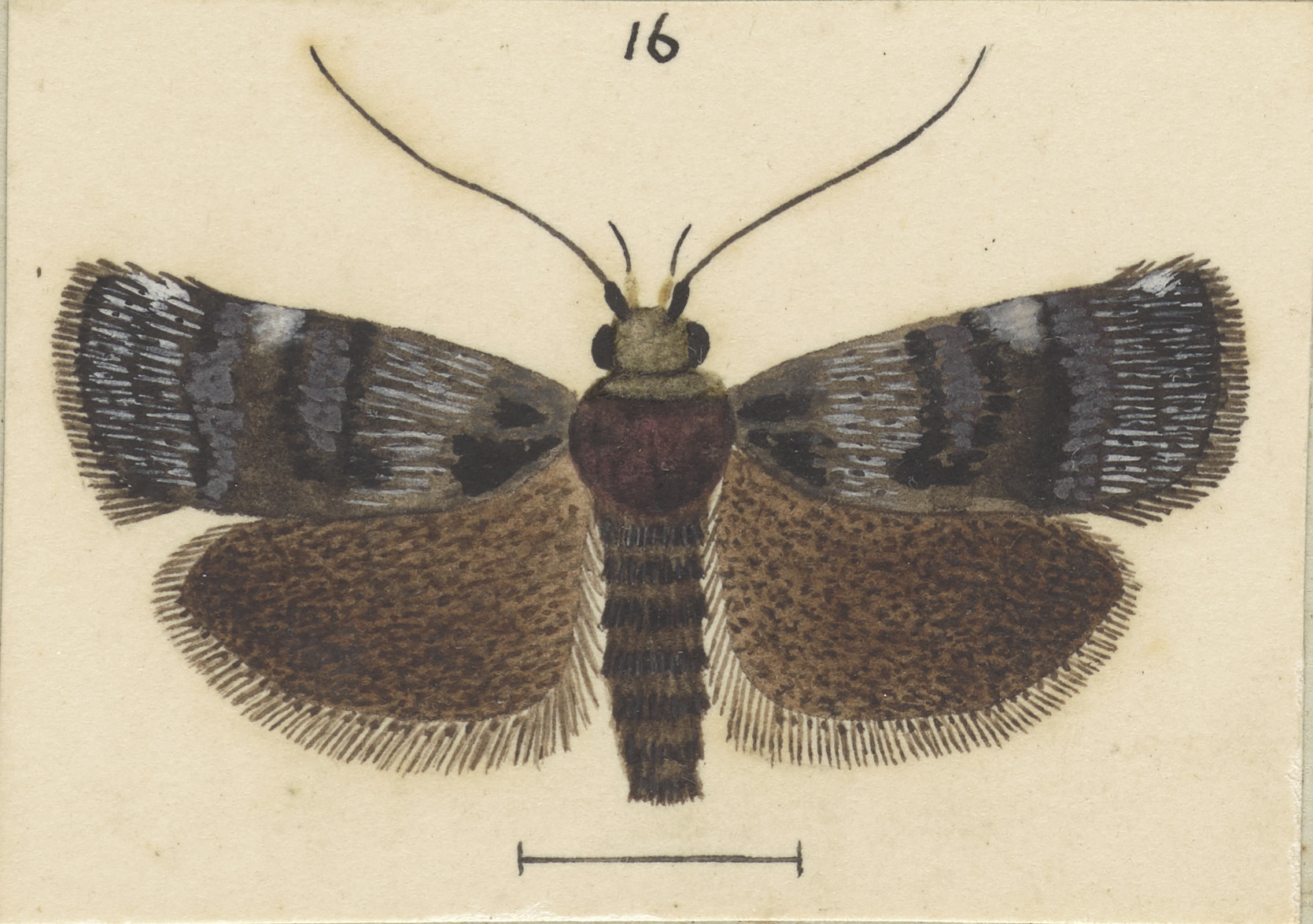
Hierodoris frigida by G. Hudson

Philpott described this species as follows:

♂♀ 11–13 mm. Head and thorax dark fuscous with violet and purplish metallic reflections. Palpi yellow, terminal segment infuscated. Antennae black with grey pubescence. Abdomen fuscous-black densely irrorated with shining golden scales, segmental divisions grey, anal tuft fuscous mixed with greyish-white. Legs dark fuscous, tibiae and tarsi annulated with yellowish-white. Forewings moderate, costa slightly arched, apex obtuse, termen slightly rounded, little oblique; dark fuscous mixed with black; a broad band of scattered white scales from costa at 1/5 to dorsum at 1/3; an irregular white spot on costa at 2/3; three irregular violet-purple spots, first and second beneath costa before and beyond white costal spot, third below second, sometimes coalescing with it; a broad subterminal band of scattered white scales, frequently occupying the whole of the space beyond metallic spots: cilia fuscous. Hindwings dark fuscous: cilia pale fuscous with dark basal line.

Although similar to H. iophanes this species can be distinguished as H. frigida has white bands on its forewings and the metallic coloured areas differ in placement. Segment 2 on the labial palp is entirely yellow and ensures that this species can be distinguished from the similar appearing species H. polita and H. torrida.

== Distribution ==
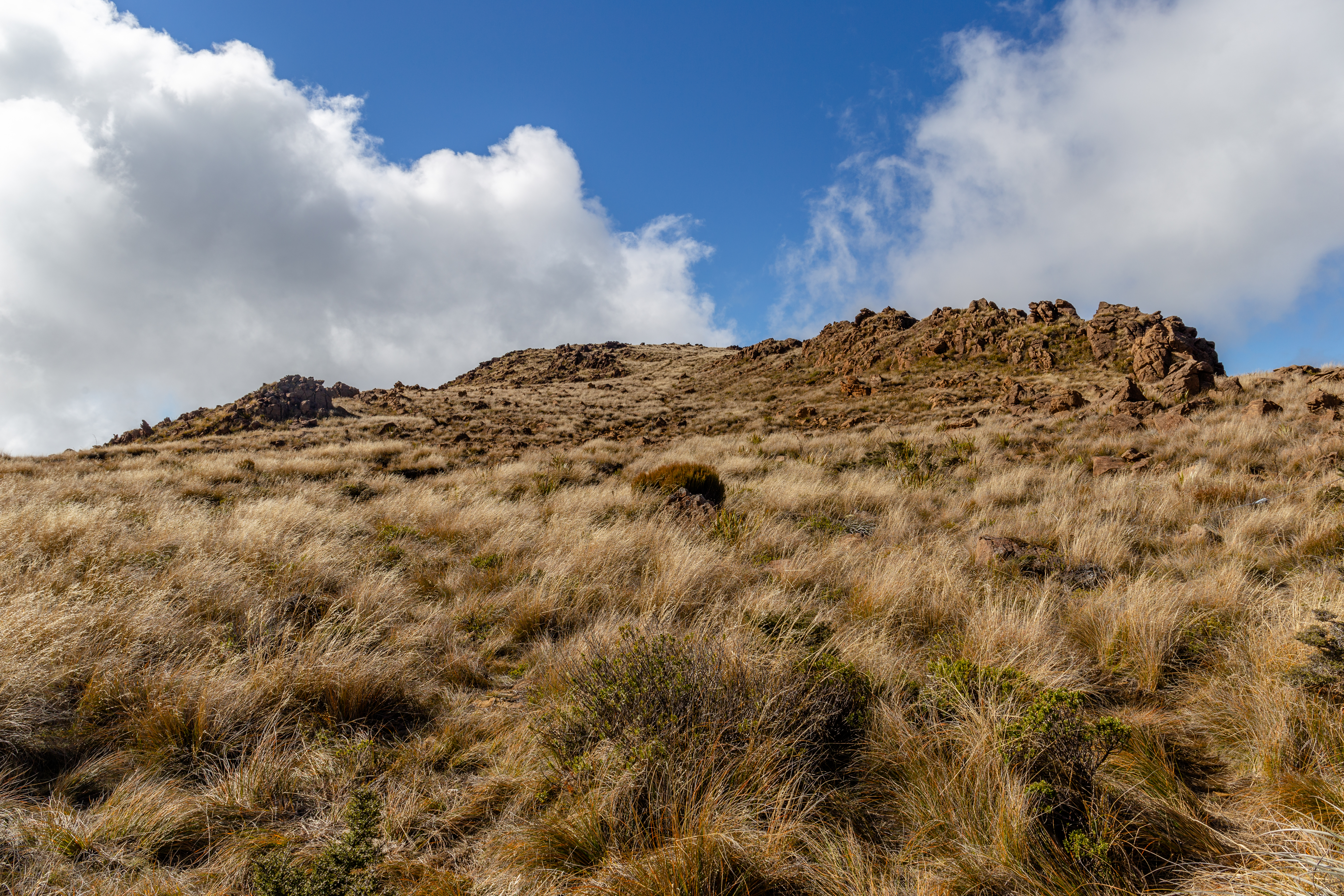
Dun Mountain, type locality of H. frigida.

This species is endemic to New Zealand and is found only in the South Island. It appears to have populations in two areas, the first being the Nelson/Tasman districts, and the second being south Canterbury south including the Mackenzie, central Otago and Dunedin areas.

== Behaviour ==
This species is on the wing during the day and has been observed flying close to the soil underneath Leptospermum scrub.

== Hosts and habitats ==
The larvae have been collected amongst leaf litter from beneath invasive species within the genus Thymus. This species prefers open and shrubland habitats. It is also present at the Conroys Road Inland Saline Wetland Complex.
