= Onychogonia =

Scientific classification
- Kingdom: Animalia
- Phylum: Arthropoda
- Class: Insecta
- Order: Diptera
- Family: Tachinidae
- Subfamily: Exoristinae
- Tribe: Goniini
- Genus: Onychogonia; Brauer & von Berganstamm, 1889

Type species
- Gonia interrupta Rondani, 1859

Synonyms
- Goniocnephalia Townsend, 1915

Genus of flies

Onychogonia is a genus of flies in the family Tachinidae.

== Species ==
- Onychogonia cervini (Bigot, 1881)
- Onychogonia fissiforceps (Tothill, 1924)
- Onychogonia flaviceps (Zetterstedt, 1838)
- Onychogonia magna Brooks, 1944
- Onychogonia melanica (Townsend, 1915)
- Onychogonia suggesta (Pandellé, 1896)
- Onychogonia tenuiforceps (Morrison, 1940)
