= Onychogonia flaviceps =

Scientific classification
- Kingdom: Animalia
- Phylum: Arthropoda
- Class: Insecta
- Order: Diptera
- Family: Tachinidae
- Subfamily: Exoristinae
- Tribe: Goniini
- Genus: Onychogonia
- Species: O. flaviceps

Binomial name
- Onychogonia flaviceps (Zetterstedt, 1838)

Synonyms
- Gonia albifrons Walker, 1849; Gonia flaviceps Zetterstedt, 1838; Gonia interrupta Rondani, 1859; Gonia yukonensis Tothill, 1924

Species of fly

Onychogonia flaviceps is a species of bristle fly in the family Tachinidae.

== Distribution ==
Canada, United States, Czech Republic, Poland, Slovakia, Finland, Norway, Sweden, Bulgaria, Italy, Austria, France, Switzerland, Japan, Mongolia, Russia.
