= Mouthparts =

Mouthparts may refer to:

- The parts of a mouth
  - Arthropod mouthparts
    - Insect mouthparts
