= Clypeus =

One of the hardened body parts that make up the face of an arthropod

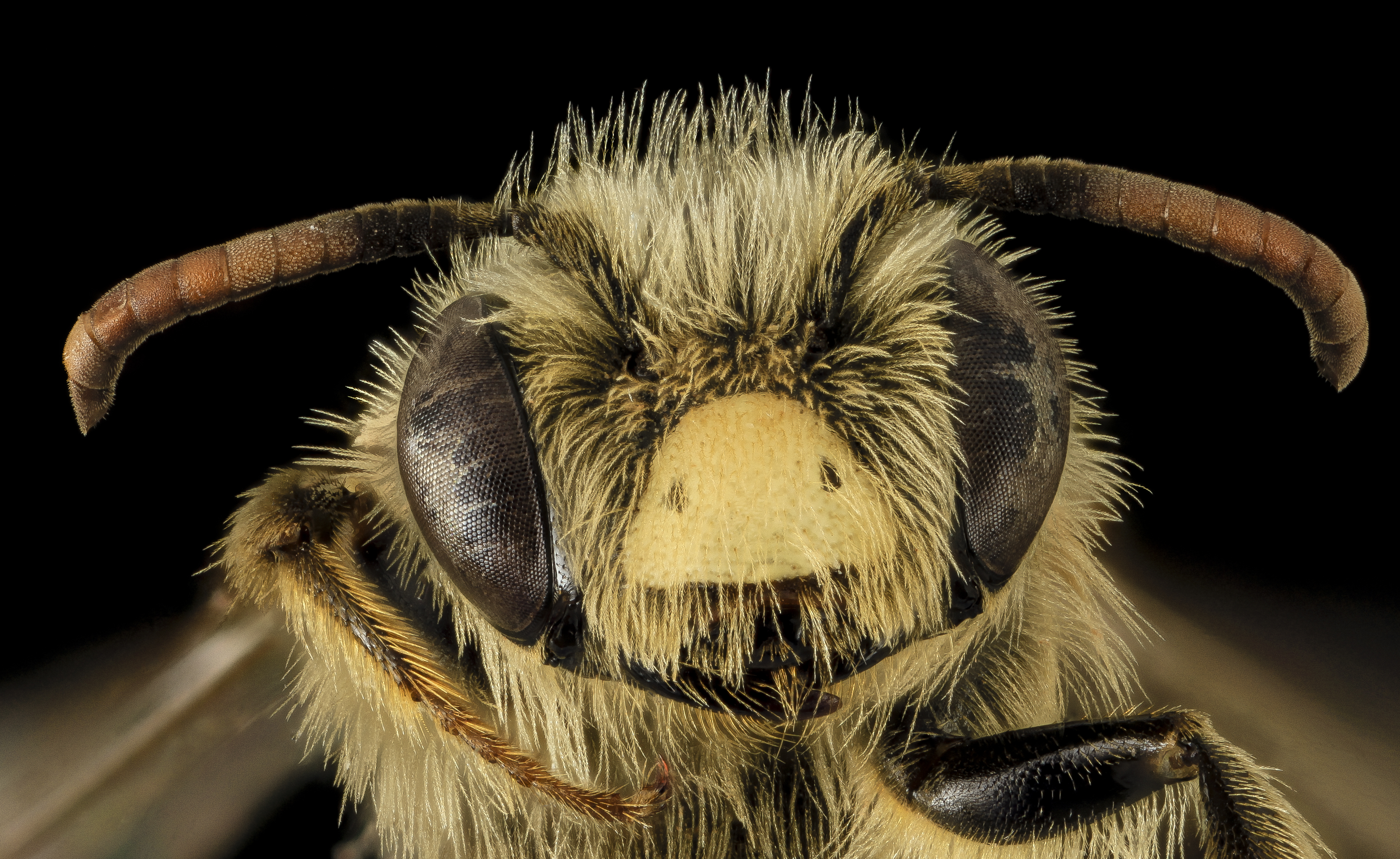
Yellow clypeus of a bee

Clypeus (turquoise) of a generalized insect

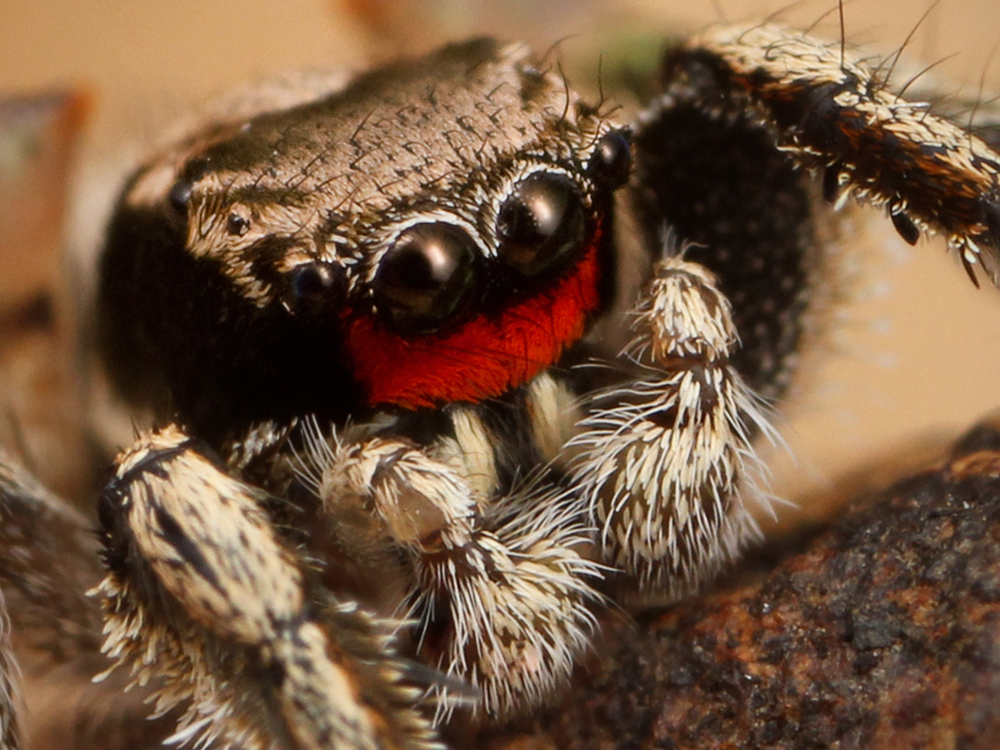
The clypeus of this jumping spider is covered with red scales.

The clypeus is one of the sclerites that make up the face of an arthropod. In insects, the clypeus delimits the lower margin of the face, with the labrum articulated along the ventral margin of the clypeus. The mandibles bracket the labrum, but do not touch the clypeus. The dorsal margin of the clypeus is below the antennal sockets. The clypeus is often well-defined by sulci ("grooves") along its lateral and dorsal margins, and is most commonly rectangular or trapezoidal in overall shape.

The post-clypeus is a large nose-like structure that lies between the eyes and makes up much of the front of the head in cicadas.

In spiders, the clypeus is generally the area between the anterior edge of the carapace and the anterior eyes.
