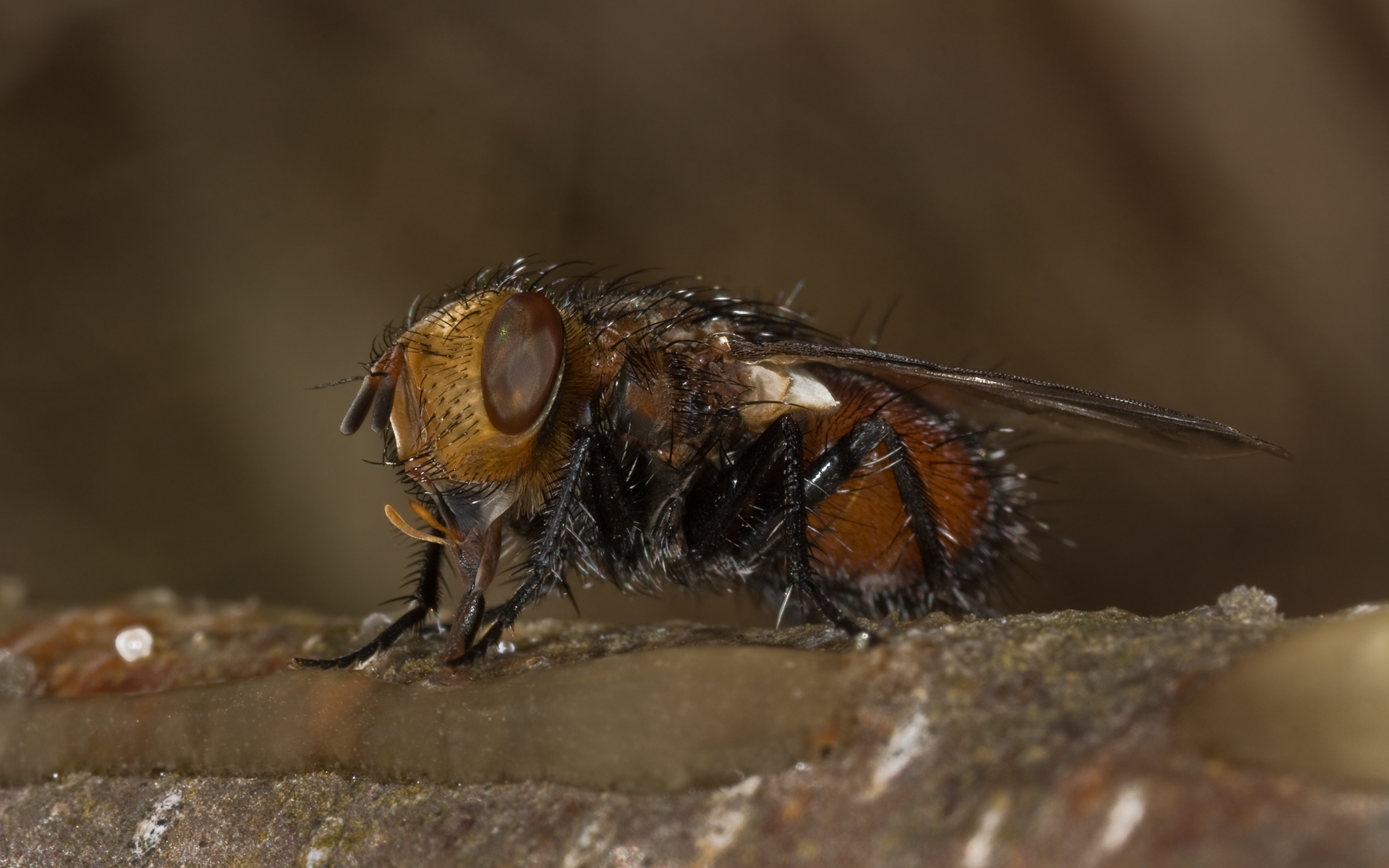
- Gonia capitata

Scientific classification
- Kingdom: Animalia
- Phylum: Arthropoda
- Class: Insecta
- Order: Diptera
- Family: Tachinidae
- Subfamily: Exoristinae
- Tribe: Goniini
- Genus: Gonia; Meigen, 1803

Type species
- Gonia bimaculata Wiedemann, 1819

Synonyms
- Chrysocerogonia Rohdendorf, 1928; Cnephalogonia Townsend, 1916; Cystogonia Townsend, 1915; Eremogonia Rohdendorf, 1928; Fuscigonia Brooks, 1944; Gonida Gobert, 1887; Gonioclea Villeneuve, 1929; Knabia Townsend, 1915; Phosococephalops Townsend, 1927; Pissemya Robineau-Desvoidy, 1851; Pissemyia Schiner, 1861; Reaumuria Robineau-Desvoidy, 1830; Redia Bezzi, 1907; Rhedia Robineau-Desvoidy, 1830; Salmacia Meigen, 1908; Setigonia Brooks, 1944

= Gonia (fly) =

Genus of flies

Gonia is a genus of flies in the family Tachinidae.

== Species ==
- Gonia albagenae Morrison, 1940
- Gonia aldrichi Tothill, 1924
- Gonia alpina (Townsend, 1912)
- Gonia asiatica (Rohdendorf, 1928)
- Gonia aterrima Tschorsnig, 1991
- Gonia atra Meigen, 1826
- Gonia atrata Bischof, 1906
- Gonia aturgida Brooks, 1944
- Gonia bimaculata Wiedemann, 1819
- Gonia breviforceps Tothill, 1924
- Gonia brevipulvilli Tothill, 1924
- Gonia capitata (De Geer, 1776)
- Gonia carinata Tothill, 1924
- Gonia chilonis Walker, 1849
- Gonia contumax Brooks, 1944
- Gonia crassicornis (Fabricius, 1794)
- Gonia desertorum (Rohdendorf, 1928)
- Gonia distincta Smith, 1915
- Gonia distinguenda Herting, 1963
- Gonia divisa Meigen, 1826
- Gonia foersteri Meigen, 1838
- Gonia frontosa Say, 1829
- Gonia fuscicollis Tothill, 1924
- Gonia genei Rondani, 1863
- Gonia kolomyetzi Mesnil, 1963
- Gonia lineata Macquart, 1851
- Gonia longiforceps Tothill, 1924
- Gonia longipulvilli Tothill, 1924
- Gonia macronychia Mesnil, 1963
- Gonia maculipennis Egger, 1862
- Gonia mexicana Wulp, 1888
- Gonia nana Becker, 1908
- Gonia nigra (Brooks, 1944)
- Gonia occidentalis Brooks, 1944
- Gonia olgae (Rohdendorf, 1927)
- Gonia ornata Meigen, 1826
- Gonia pacifica (Townsend, 1912)
- Gonia pallens Wiedemann, 1830
- Gonia peruviana (Townsend, 1912)
- Gonia picea (Robineau-Desvoidy, 1830)
- Gonia pilosa Brooks, 1944
- Gonia porca Williston, 1887
- Gonia quadriseta Becker, 1908
- Gonia reinhardi Brooks, 1944
- Gonia robusta Brooks, 1944
- Gonia rubriventris Macquart, 1851
- Gonia sagax Townsend, 1892
- Gonia senilis Williston, 1887
- Gonia sequax Williston, 1887
- Gonia setifacies (Brooks, 1944)
- Gonia setigera Tothill, 1924
- Gonia simillima Vimmer & Soukup, 1940
- Gonia smithi Brooks, 1944
- Gonia texensis Reinhard, 1924
- Gonia turgida Coquillett, 1897
- Gonia umbripennis Herting, 1958
- Gonia ussuriensis (Rohdendorf, 1928)
- Gonia vacua Meigen, 1826
- Gonia virescens Macquart, 1844
- Gonia yunnanensis Huo, Li, Yang & Zhang, 2018
- Gonia zimini Mesnil, 1963
