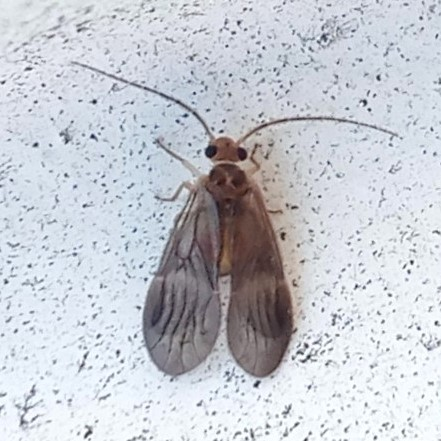
- Dolabellopsocus sp.

Scientific classification
- Kingdom: Animalia
- Phylum: Arthropoda
- Clade: Pancrustacea
- Class: Insecta
- Order: Psocodea
- Suborder: Psocomorpha
- Infraorder: Epipsocetae
- Family: Dolabellopsocidae

Genera
- Auroropsocus; Dolabellopsocus; Isthmopsocus

= Dolabellopsocidae =

Family of booklice

Dolabellopsocidae is a family of lice in the order Psocodea (formerly Psocoptera). Like the other members of the infraorder Epipsocetae, they have a labrum with two sclerotized ridges. The family, which contains more than 40 known species, was first identified by Eertmoed in 1973.

== Sources ==
- Lienhard, C. & Smithers, C. N. 2002. Psocoptera (Insecta): World Catalogue and Bibliography. Instrumenta Biodiversitatis, vol. 5. Muséum d'histoire naturelle, Genève.
