= Gonia longiforceps =

Scientific classification
- Kingdom: Animalia
- Phylum: Arthropoda
- Class: Insecta
- Order: Diptera
- Family: Tachinidae
- Subfamily: Exoristinae
- Tribe: Goniini
- Genus: Gonia
- Species: G. longiforceps

Binomial name
- Gonia longiforceps Tothill, 1924

Synonyms
- Gonia discalis Morrison, 1940

Species of fly

Gonia longiforceps is a species of fly in the family Tachinidae.

== Distribution ==
Canada, United States.
