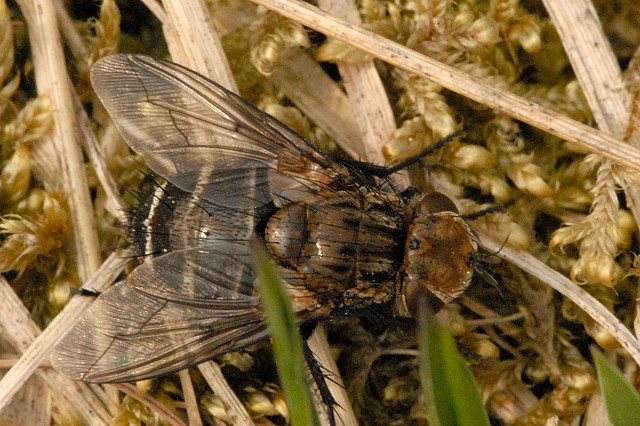
- Gonia picea

Scientific classification
- Kingdom: Animalia
- Phylum: Arthropoda
- Clade: Pancrustacea
- Class: Insecta
- Order: Diptera
- Family: Tachinidae
- Subfamily: Exoristinae
- Tribe: Goniini
- Genus: Gonia
- Species: G. picea

Binomial name
- Gonia picea (Robineau-Desvoidy, 1830)

Synonyms
- Spallanzania picea Robineau-Desvoidy, 1830; Gonia fasciata Meigen, 1826; Musca piniperdae Ratzeburg, 1844; Reaumuria desvoidyi Robineau-Desvoidy, 1830

= Gonia picea =

Species of fly

Gonia picea is a Palaearctic species of fly in the family Tachinidae.

== Distribution ==
British Isles, Czech Republic, Hungary, Moldova, Poland, Romania, Slovakia, Ukraine, Denmark, Finland, Norway, Sweden, Bulgaria, Croatia, Greece, Italy, Portugal, Serbia, Spain, Turkey, Austria, Belgium, France, Germany, Netherlands, Switzerland, Japan, North Korea, Israel, Palestine, Russia, Transcaucasia, Turkmenistan, China, Taiwan.

== Hosts ==
The larvae of Cerapteryx graminis, Xestia xanthographa, Staurophora celsia, Mamestra brassicae, Mythimna comma & Polygonia c-album.
