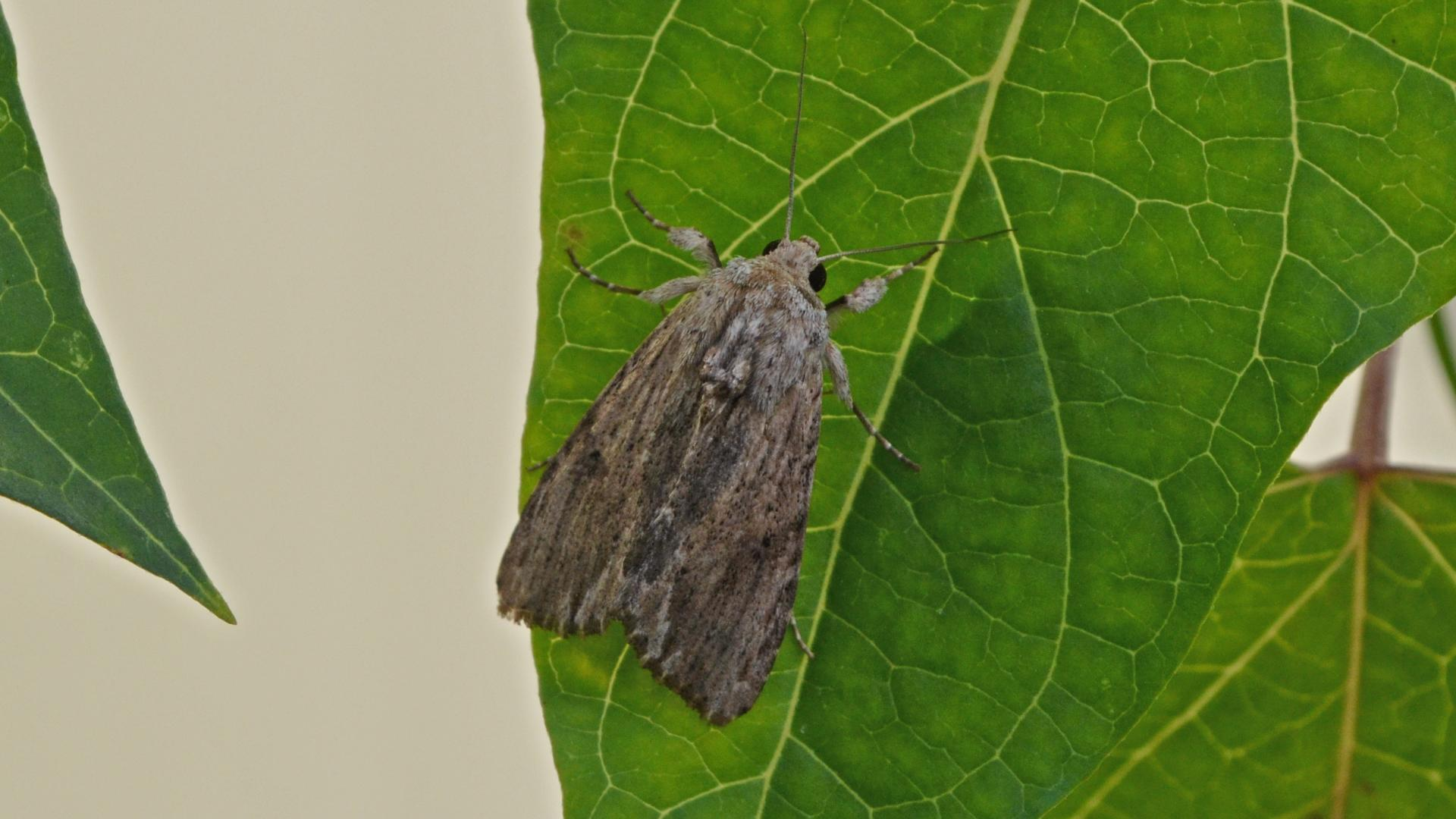
- Imago
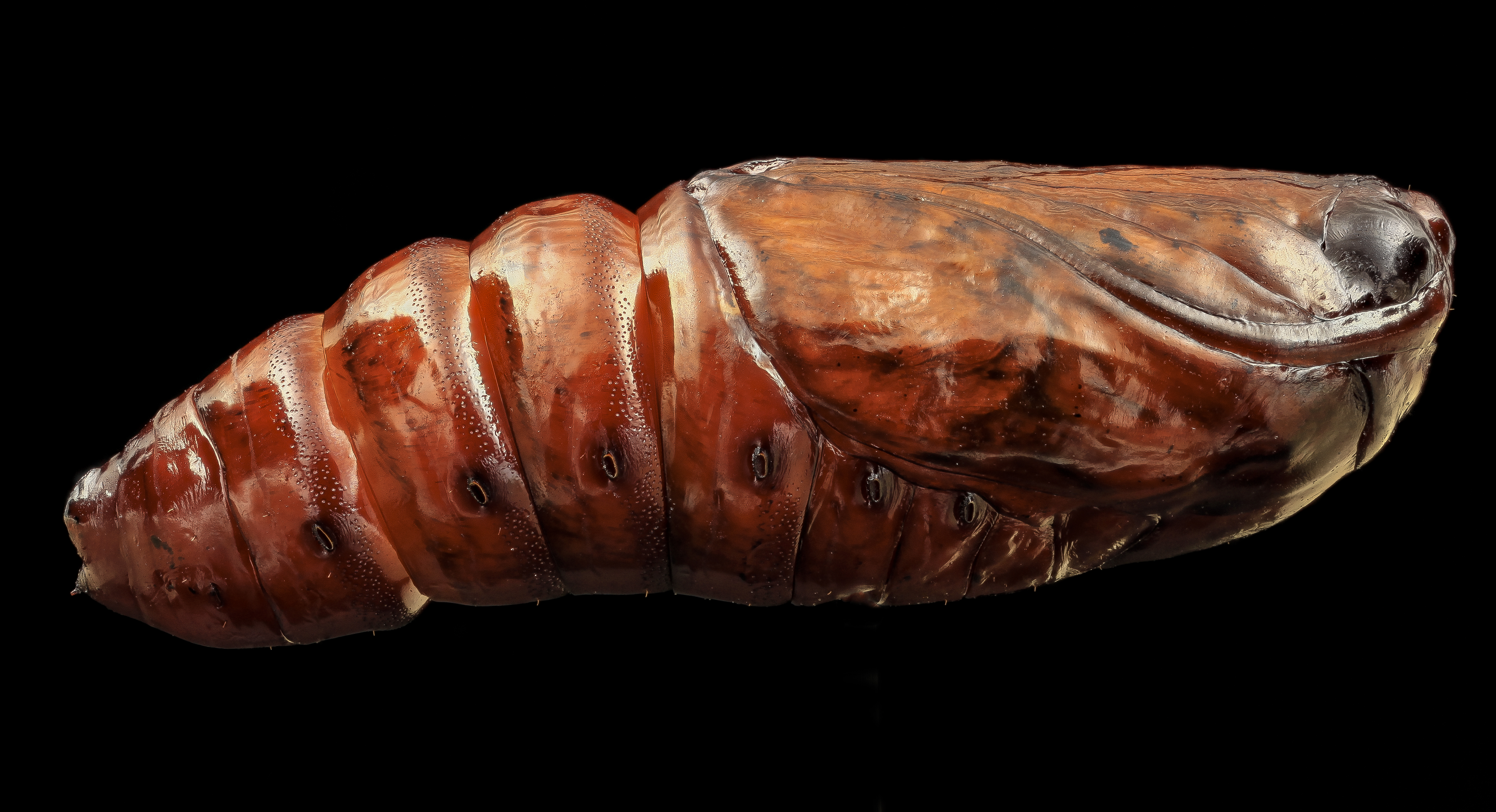
- Pupa

Scientific classification
- Kingdom: Animalia
- Phylum: Arthropoda
- Clade: Pancrustacea
- Class: Insecta
- Order: Lepidoptera
- Superfamily: Noctuoidea
- Family: Noctuidae
- Genus: Spodoptera
- Species: S. eridania

Binomial name
- Spodoptera eridania Stoll, 1781

Synonyms
- Phalaena eridania; Nocua linea; Phalaena phytolaccae; Xylomyges putrida; Xylomyges amygia; Leucania externa; Xylina inquieta; Xylina bipunctata; Prodenia strigifera; Actinotia derupta; Prodenia ignobilis; Leucania nigrofascia; Callierges recondita; Spodoptera linea; Spodoptera phytolaccae; Spodoptera amygia; Spodoptera putrida; Spodoptera externa; Spodoptera bipunctata; Spodoptera inquieta; Spodoptera strigifera; Spodoptera derupta; Spodoptera ignobilis; Spodoptera nigrofascia; Spodoptera recondita

= Spodoptera eridania =

Southern armyworm

Species of moth

Spodoptera eridania (Southern armyworm) is a moth that is known to be a pest. They are one of the most important defoliators in the tropical and subtropical regions of the western hemisphere that feed heavily on plants while they are young, often resulting in skeleton leaves on their food plants. They are also heavy feeders on tomato in Florida. There is a lot of development in producing pesticides against the S. eridania, specifically a neem-based pesticide that can result in smaller and prolonged development. The wingspan is 33–38 mm. Adults are on wing year-round. The larvae feed on various weeds but prefer Amaranthus species and Phytolacca americana.

== Geographic range ==
The S. eridania is found in North America (the southern US states as far west as Kansas and New Mexico), through the Caribbean and Central America into South America (through Brazil to Argentina). It has been introduced Nigeria and Cameroon.

== Food resources ==
=== Host plants ===
The plants that the armyworm feeds on include a wide range of important vegetables, fruits, and crops. The vegetables include beet, cabbage, carrot, collard, cowpea, eggplant, okra, pepper, potato, sweet potato, tomato, and watermelon. Other crops damaged include avocado, citrus, peanut, sunflower, velvet bean, tobacco and various flowers. Grasses are rarely eaten. One of the more preferred host plants is the lima bean, probably due to contact of cyanogenic glycoside linamarin. The lima bean is known to contain up to 31 ppm cyanide in some varieties.

=== Glucosinolates ===
Glucosinolates are feeding deterrents and are toxic to non-adapted herbivores. With higher glucosinolate concentrations, there is reduced feeding by S. eridania on B. juncea, a host plant. There is relative unresponsiveness of S. eridania to variation in myrosinase activity. This suggests that glucosinolates may have originated as defenses against generalist herbivores. Insects selectively adapting to glucosinolates may have selected for stronger defense produced by their rapid hydrolysis by myrosinase.

== Environmental impact ==
Larvae are defoliators and feed gregariously while young, often skeletonizing leaves. As they mature they become solitary, and also bore readily into fruit, often damaging tomatoes in Florida. It can result in significant yield losses if uncontrolled. When stressed by a lack of food they will eat the apical portions of branches, bore into stem tissue, and attack tubers near the surface of the soil.

== Insecticides ==
=== Neem-based insecticide ===
A lot of research has been done on neem-based insecticides. There has been growing interest in the agricultural sector in using plant and botanical insecticides as alternatives to restore a biologically base equilibrium in insect populations. Neem has been shown to be a feeding deterrent for insects. The primary active ingredient in neem is azadirachtin, a steroid-like tetranortriterpenoid, that exhibits a wide range of bioactivity to hundreds of phytophagous insect species from different orders. There has been shown evidence that neem based products interfere with the regulation of feeding and metabolism as well as with anatomy and function of midgut tissues. Neem-based formulations of pesticides reduced the amount of food ingest by S. eridania larvae. The growth that is disrupted by neem is determined not only by feeding inhibition but also by digestibility, as the S. eridania larvae showed reduced efficiency in converting ingested food. These setbacks in growth and food ingestion and digestion extend the development time of larvae. Neem-based pesticides are exceptional in having broad range of bioactivity against herbivores that include toxicity, growth regulation, repellency, feeding deterrency, and disruption of metamorphosis.

Pure neem oil has been found to be the most effective antifeedants by the third instar. Pure neem oil and azatrol are most effective feeding deterrent for the second and fourth instars of southern armyworm. Although these products worked in laboratory experiences, it was found that the magnitude of the negative effect on the larval mortality and pupal ecdysis varied considerably among neem-derived insecticides tested.

=== GMO soybean plants ===
Research has also been done with the genetically modified soybean plant. They are created with insect resistance genes from Bacillus thuringiensis Berliner (Bt-plants) and increasingly being cultivated around the world. Research has shown that the Bt soybean does not affect pest foliage consumption but does reduce larval duration by around two days.

=== Field corn ===
Larvae fed on fresh ear of field corn that expressed the Bt proteins (Cry1F and Cry1F + Cry1A.105 + Cry2Ab2), showed a 100% mortality rate. Bt is found all over the world and they produce a protein crystal that is toxic to insects. It is also safer than synthetic pesticides, and is also selective towards specific insects. S. eridania larvae survived less than two days after consuming Bt corncobs, while larvae reared on non-Bt corn cobs showed higher larval development than other species in Lepidoptera family. They ended up having poor development when fed on maize leaves.

=== Soybean cultivars ===
In the cerrado region of Brazil, the S. eridania has high capacity of defoliation and high population densities. It is an important pest of soybean, causing damage and economic losses. The cultivar of monsoy 8757 had the most significant impact on the development of S. eridania. There is an increase in duration of larval, pupal and total cycle, and a reduction in pupal mass. The consequences may be favorable to the producer since the extension of the duration of the life cycle can reduce the number of generations that cycle in the field, and decrease the number of pests in the field.

=== Plant phenols ===
Two classes of phenols were analyzed for their effect on the southern armyworm. Rutin and quercetin were found to cause some mortality. The larvae died about 2–4 days after the onset of trials. Rutin also reduced growth rates by decreasing the consumption and digestion efficiency of the larvae. Salicortin, a gut toxin, caused numerous lesions in the gut of larvae, and were large and abundant in every section. However, these results do show that toxicity is not an inherent trait of even a narrowly defined class of phytochemicals, as minor structural changes within the compound masked reactive sites, which changes solubility and susceptibility of the chemical.

== Life history ==
=== Life cycle ===
The number of generations is estimated at four each year in Florida. In northern Florida, moths can be found throughout the year, withstanding several days of freezing weather. S. eridania larvae are found in northern Florida only in the summer months, which is consistent with most other insects. One generation is about 30 to 40 days.

==== Egg ====
The shape of the eggs is a flattened sphere. Eggs measure about 0.45 mm in diameter and 0.35 mm in height. The eggs are green initially, turning tan as they age. Eggs are laid in clusters, and covered with scales from the body of the moth. Duration of the egg stage is four to six days.

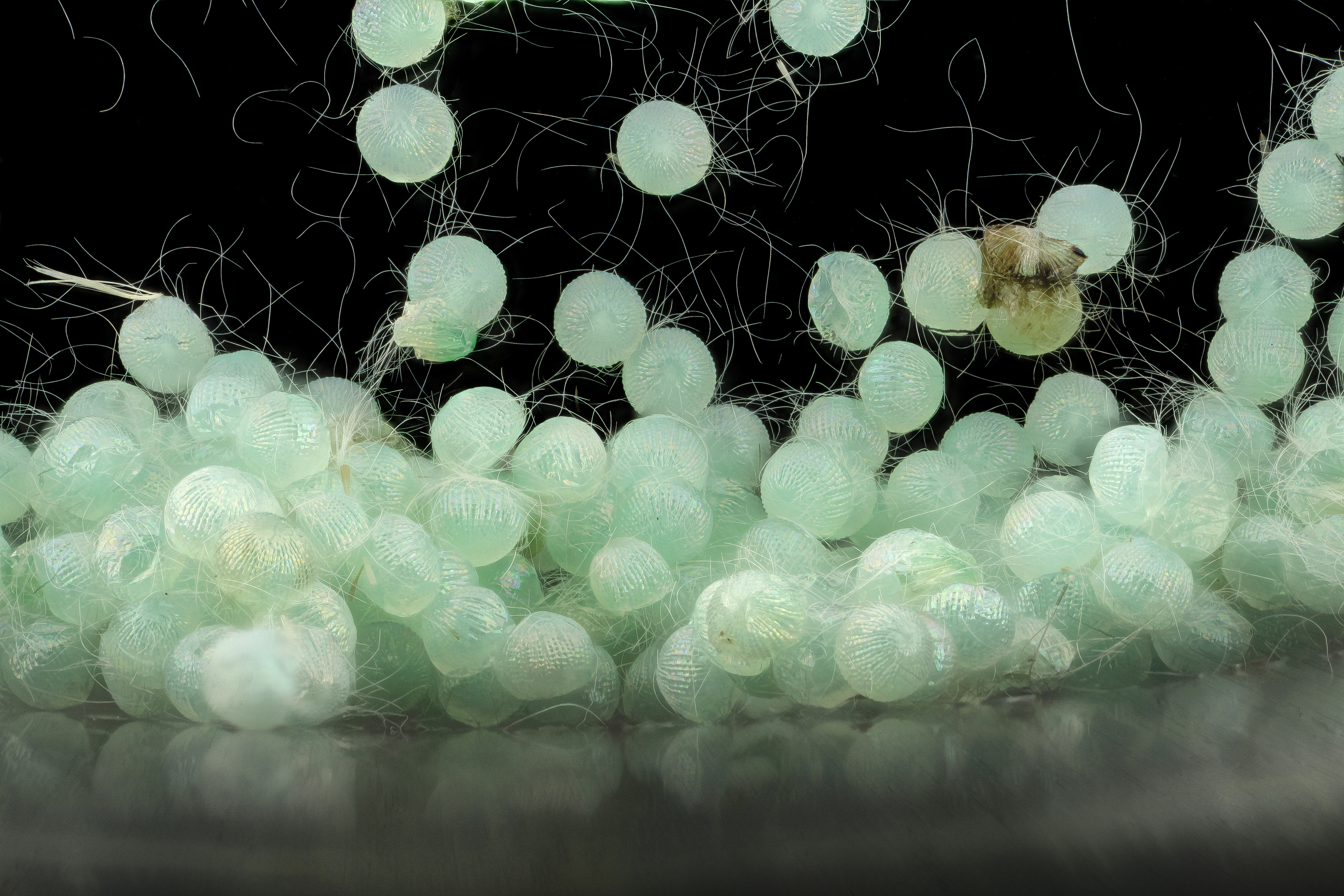
Eggs of southern armyworm

==== Larvae ====
The armyworm has six instars as they grow to attain a length of about 35 mm. Larvae are green or blackish green with uniform light brown or reddish brown through the period of development. Each side has a broad yellowish stripe that has a dark spot on the first abdominal segment. Series of dark triangles are usually present dorso-laterally along the length of the body. Larvae are usually found on the lower part of leaves and are more active at night than during the day. The larval stage usually lasts around 14 to 20 days.

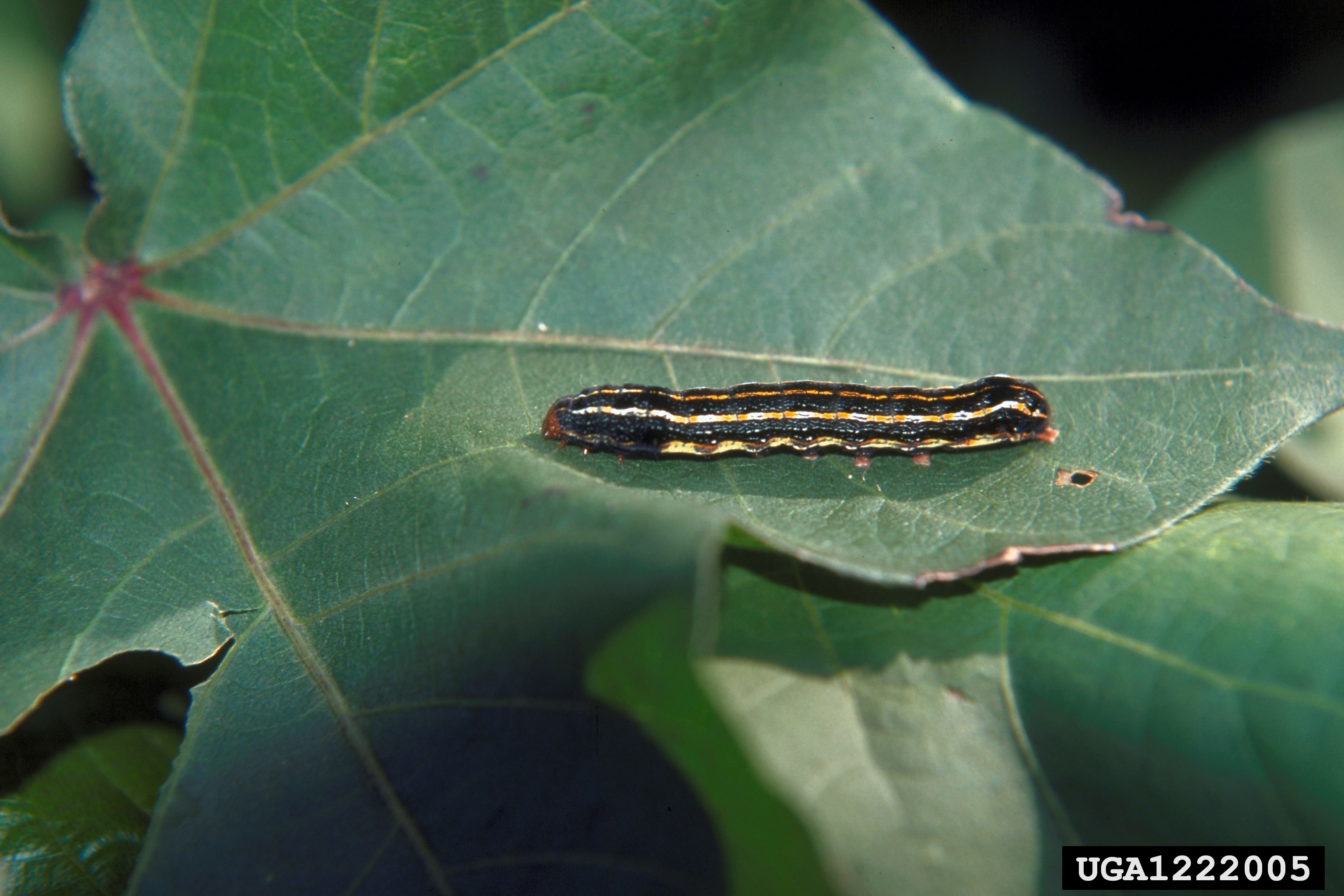
Caterpillar stage

==== Pupae ====
Larvae pupate in the ground soil, at a depth of 5 to 10 cm; pupae are mahogany brown and are about 16–18 mm in length and 5-6mm in width; duration of the pupal period is about 11–13 days. Female pupae may have difficulty in transforming into adults. There is also sexual dimorphism between the female and male pupae. The larger size of the female may be attributed to the additional instar. Survival of males from large pupae tends to be shorter than males from small pupae. Larger males and females that emerged from larger pupae tend to survive for shorter periods of time. Fecundity has also been found to be positively correlated with size.

==== Adults ====
The adult moth measures about 33 to 38 mm in wing span. The forewings are colored gray and brown. Its wing pattern is highly variable with some with bean-shaped spot near the center of the wing whereas others do not have the spot. The back or hind wings are opalescent white.

== Predators ==
Parasitoid insects associated with southern armyworm caterpillars include:

=== Wasps ===
- Campoletis flavicincta
- Chelonus insularis
- Cotesia marginiventris
- Euplectrus platyhypenae
- Meteorus autographae (the dominant parasitoid in Tingle et al. 1978)
- Meteorus laphygmae
- Ophion flavidus

=== Flies ===
- Choeteprosopa hedemanni
- Eucelatoria rubentis
- Euphorocera claripennis
- Gonia crassicornis
- Lespensia sp.
- Winthemia quadripustulata
- Winthemia rufopicta

== Interactions with humans ==
=== Management ===
The southern armyworm is best controlled with foliar insecticides when larvae are small. Insecticides vary considerably in their toxicity to larvae, which are difficult to control with botanical insecticides. Berger (1920) reported some success at southern armyworm suppression by application of bran bait containing insecticide. However, this is primarily useful for large, mobile larvae that have left the plant and are on the soil surface.
