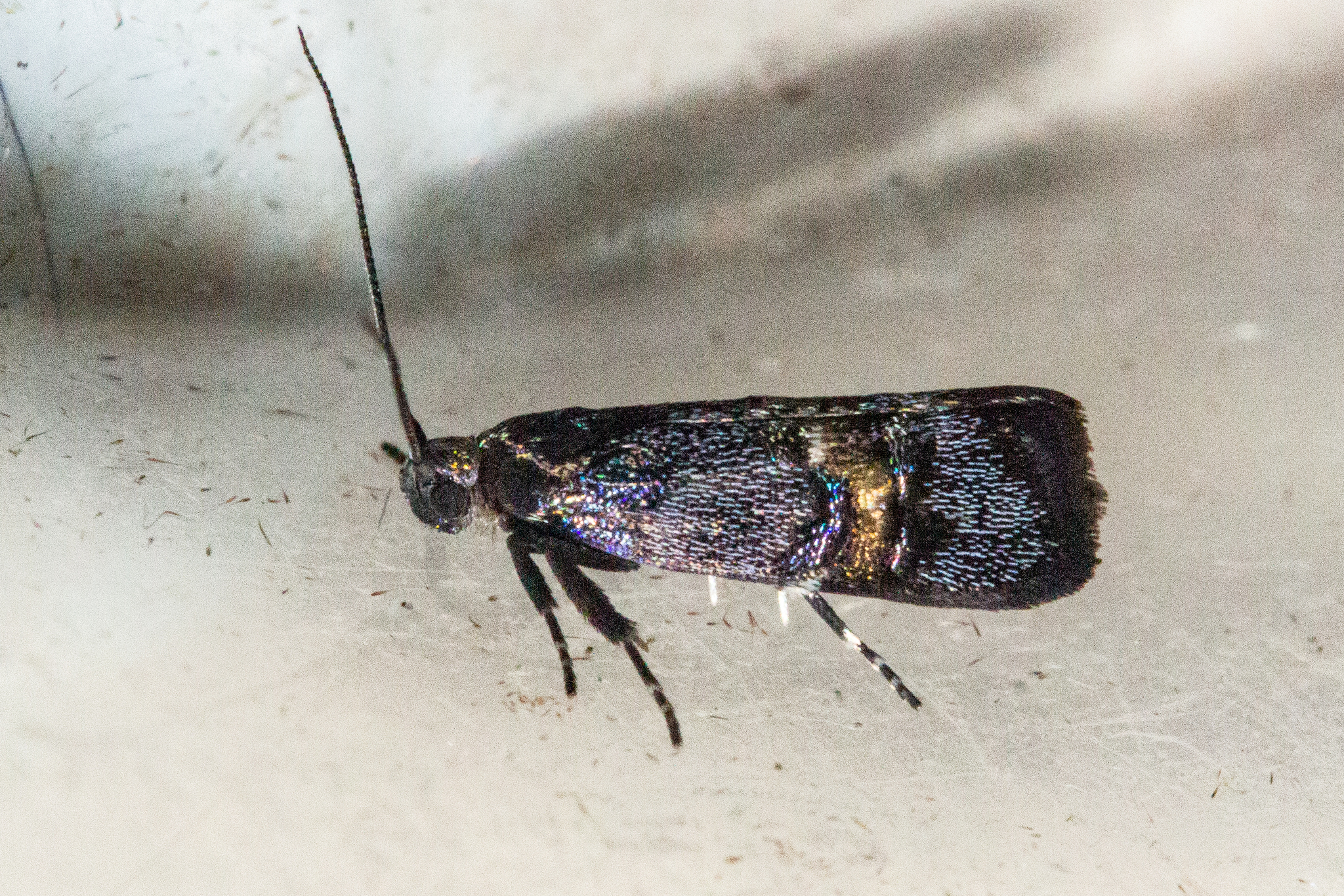
- Hierodoris torrida found on Banks Peninsula, New Zealand

Conservation status
- Relict (NZ TCS)

Scientific classification
- Kingdom: Animalia
- Phylum: Arthropoda
- Class: Insecta
- Order: Lepidoptera
- Family: Oecophoridae
- Genus: Hierodoris
- Species: H. torrida

Binomial name
- Hierodoris torrida Hoare, 2005

= Hierodoris torrida =

Species of moth

Hierodoris torrida is a species of moth in the family Oecophoridae. This species is endemic to New Zealand and can be found in the southern parts of the North Island, in Rangitikei and Wellington, and in the east of the South Island, in the Marlborough Sounds, Kaikōura, Mid and South Canterbury. The larvae of this species is unknown as is much of the biology of this species and its larval hosts. The adult moth prefers lowland forest habitat. It is classified as "At Risk, Relict'" by the Department of Conservation.

== Taxonomy ==
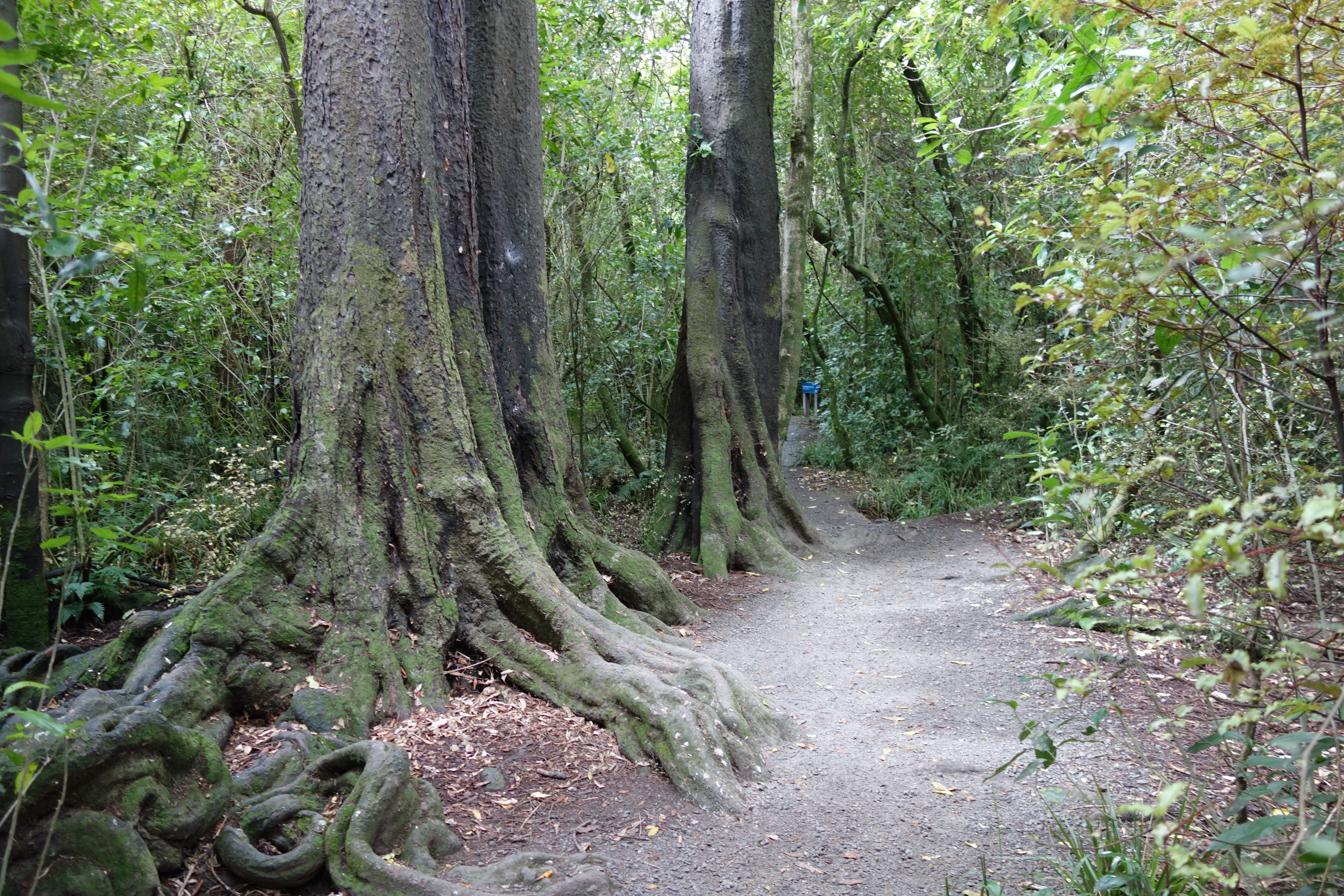
Riccarton Bush, type locality of H. torrida.

This species was named by Robert J. B. Hoare in 2005. The species was first collected by Stella Hudson at Upper Hutt in Wellington and was mentioned in George Hudson's 1939 publication A supplement to the butterflies and moths of New Zealand under the name Hierodoris frigida. The type specimen of this species, collected at Riccarton Bush, is held at the New Zealand Arthropod Collection.

== Description ==
This species is similar in appearance to its close relatives Hierodoris polita and H. frigida. It can be distinguished from H. polita as H. torrida doesn't have the white forewing fascia, nor is it as yellow as H. frigida. It is also unlikely to be in the same habitat as either of these species.

== Distribution ==
This species is endemic to New Zealand. It can be found in the southern parts of the North Island, in Rangitikei and Wellington, and in the east of the South Island, in the Marlborough Sounds, Kaikōura, Mid and South Canterbury.

== Biology and lifecycle ==
The larvae of this species is unknown as is much of the biology of this species.

== Host species and habitat ==
The plant host species of H. torrida are unknown. The adult moth prefers lowland forest habitat.

== Conservation status ==
This moth is classified under the New Zealand Threat Classification system as being "At Risk, Relict". It has been collected at Riccarton Bush.
