= Spurostigmatidae =

Scientific classification
- Kingdom: Animalia
- Phylum: Arthropoda
- Clade: Pancrustacea
- Class: Insecta
- Order: Psocodea
- Suborder: Psocomorpha
- Infraorder: Epipsocetae
- Family: Spurostigmatidae; Eertmoed, 1973

Family of booklice

Spurostigmatidae is a family of lice in the order Psocodea (formerly Psocoptera). There is at least one genus, Spurostigma, in Spurostigmatidae.
