= Gonia pilosa =

Scientific classification
- Kingdom: Animalia
- Phylum: Arthropoda
- Class: Insecta
- Order: Diptera
- Family: Tachinidae
- Subfamily: Exoristinae
- Tribe: Goniini
- Genus: Gonia
- Species: G. pilosa

Binomial name
- Gonia pilosa Brooks, 1944

Species of fly

Gonia pilosa is a species of fly in the family Tachinidae.

== Distribution ==
Canada, United States.
