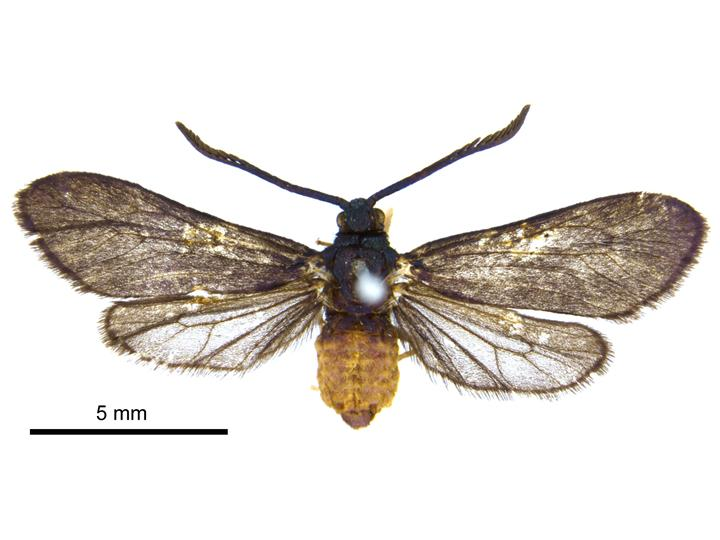

Conservation status
- Extinct (1990) (IUCN 3.1)

Scientific classification
- Kingdom: Animalia
- Phylum: Arthropoda
- Class: Insecta
- Order: Lepidoptera
- Family: Zygaenidae
- Subfamily: Procridinae
- Genus: †Levuana
- Species: †L. iridescens

Binomial name
- †Levuana iridescens Bethune-Baker, 1906

= Levuana moth =

Extinct species of moth

The levuana moth (Levuana iridescens) is an extinct species of moth in the family Zygaenidae. It is monotypic within the genus Levuana.

The levuana moth became a serious pest for coconut plants in 1877, in Viti Levu, Fiji. On the island, outbreaks of the levuana moth were frequent at that time, and as a result coconut palms were devastated due to moth larvae feeding on the underside of leaves. As a consequence, copra (dried coconut meat from which coconut oil is extracted) production was severely affected and coconut cultivation became unprofitable on Viti Levu. The levuana moth was declared extinct in 1990. The species was officially declared extinct by the IUCN in 2021.

Indigenous Fijian culture, which relied on the coconut for food, water, fiber, medicinal products, fuel, and building materials, was threatened as a result of this coconut pest. In 1916, following a forty-year isolation on Viti Levu, the levuana moth began expanding its range to close offshore islands, after a variety of cultural and chemical control strategies (over approximately a 16-year period) failed to bring this pest under effective control, until around 1925 when a historic biological control program devised by John Douglas Tothill permanently reduced high population densities to almost non-detectable levels.

== Description ==
This species had a wingspan of 16 mm and was a day-flying insect. The head and thorax are steely blue, the abdomen and legs are ochreous. In 2019, a genetic analysis found that it was a member of the tribe Artonini, and its closest relatives were of the Australian genus Myrtartona.

== History ==
While no documented Levuana sightings have been made since the 1920s, some believe that it existed in refuges up until the mid-1950s. However, this island group is considered unlikely to be the home range of this moth and it most likely originated in island groups to the west of Fiji; this is supported by the fact that although only known from Fiji, no native parasite existed there.

The young larval stage of Levuana was an insatiable eater of coconut tree foliage. Beginning in the 1870s, hordes of the moth would decimate coconut plantations and adjacent native tree populations. Initially only located on the Fiji island of Viti Levu, Levuana eventually spread to neighboring islands, including the main coconut producing island of Vanau Levu. Without predators or parasites, the Levuana population continued to rise until the species was so numerous it was considered a pest. Many attempts were made to eradicate the species, all of which were unsuccessful until the 1925 biological control program.

Canadian entomologist John Douglas Tothill spearheaded the campaign to lessen the moth's numbers. Hoping for a major drop in moth populations, Tothill proposed the introduction of a parasite to which Levuana was susceptible. However, a direct and effective parasite was not readily available in Fiji. Tothill then introduced a parasitoid of a moth in a related genus, Artona; this was a Malaysian fly species, Bessa remota, which proved immensely successful in lowering Levuana populations.

To this day it is unknown whether or not the levuana moth is truly extinct or not. Although the biological control program dramatically decreased the population of the moth, it is still possible that it exists today, but in very small numbers.

The levuana moth preferentially attacks the tallest coconut palms in highly localized areas. When the tallest palms are defoliated, the moth moves on to shorter ones. Based on the fact that severe outbreaks no longer appear, it is theorized that this insect solely inhabits its preferred feeding sites: the tallest trees, in small quantity, leading to visual searches on small immature coconut palms to be unsuccessful. It is believed that if they still exist, they are inhabiting the neighboring islands of Fiji.

== Controversy ==
In 1925, J.D. Tothill and colleagues managed to drastically curb the moth's numbers by introducing the Malayan tachinid fly (Bessa remota) to the Levuana iridescens environment. This form of biological control was employed to ensure the survival of the copra crop which grew from the coconut palm that was threatened by the moth. Copra, next to sugar, is the most significant industry in Fiji, and since 1877 the foliage of the palms had been eaten by the moth's larva to the point of ruin. This push to exterminate the moth in Fiji was met with harsh criticism for such a deliberate and targeted extinction of a species. However, scientific and biological data has shown some limited evidence that the moth was most likely not completely eradicated at the time, and had spread its population to other neighboring islands.

There is controversy over the usage of parasitoids to cause preemptive extinction of the Levuana moth. The controversy concerns deciding which is more important: the cultural sustenance which comes from the crops of the Pacific Islanders, or the protection of a unique species, even if it is considered a pest.

There are also many arguments about whether or not biological control is worth implementing in the first place. Questions arise on various issues: whether or not implementations of this practice may result in harm to non-target species; whether it is affordable to test the effectiveness or detrimental side-effects of biological control; if lab testing is precise enough to measure these effects; if more harm will arise from simply doing nothing; or if biological control is a significant enough threat to exotic species survival to research its impacts on extinction. In this case, it is believed that the use of a generalist parasitoid caused harm to other species on Fiji as well, as it is considered highly likely that it caused other native moth species to go extinct.
