= Gonia senilis =

Scientific classification
- Kingdom: Animalia
- Phylum: Arthropoda
- Class: Insecta
- Order: Diptera
- Family: Tachinidae
- Subfamily: Exoristinae
- Tribe: Goniini
- Genus: Gonia
- Species: G. senilis

Binomial name
- Gonia senilis Williston, 1887

Species of fly

Gonia senilis is a species of fly in the family Tachinidae.

== Distribution ==
United States, Canada.
