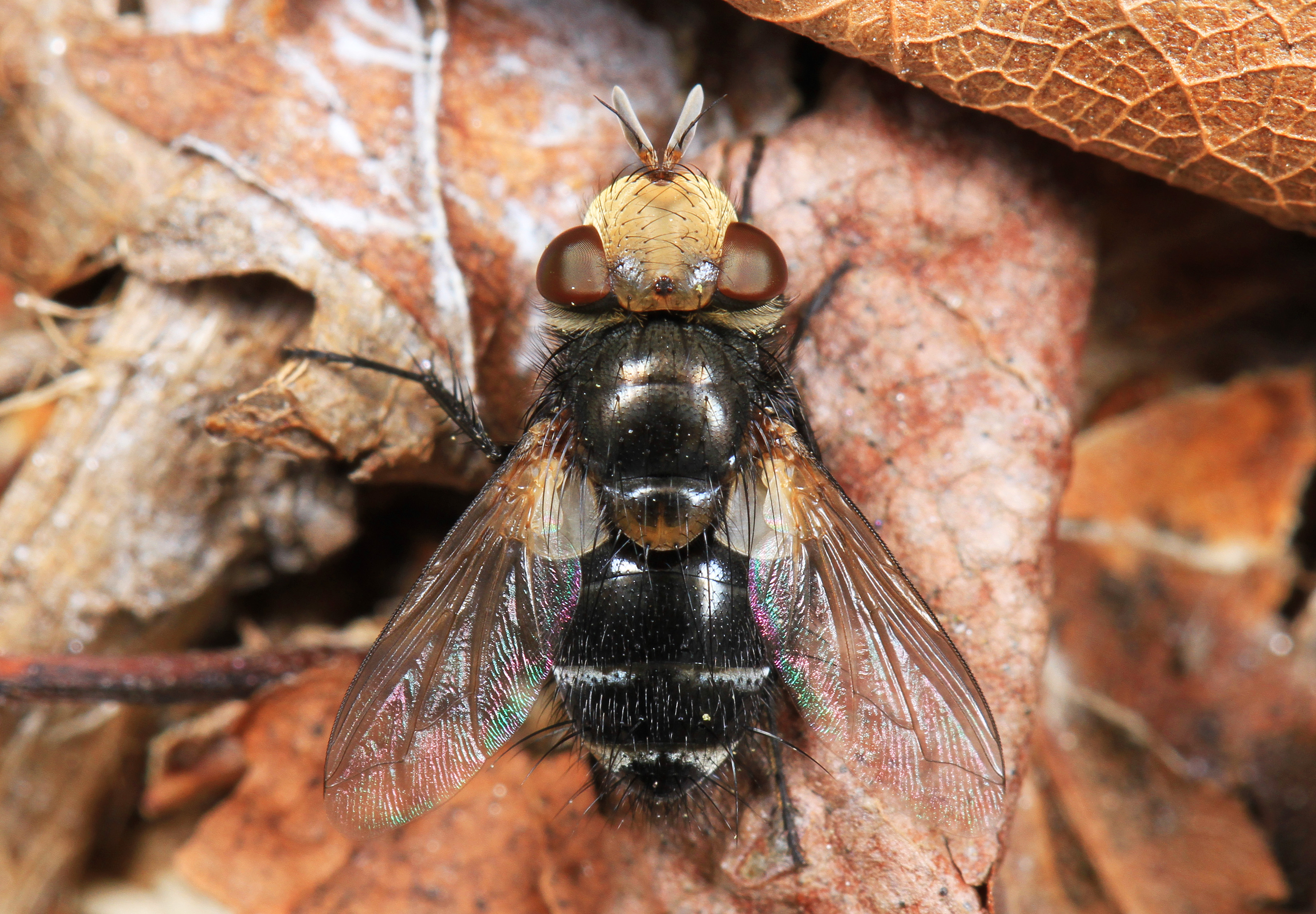
- Gonia frontosa

Scientific classification
- Kingdom: Animalia
- Phylum: Arthropoda
- Class: Insecta
- Order: Diptera
- Family: Tachinidae
- Subfamily: Exoristinae
- Tribe: Goniini
- Genus: Gonia
- Species: G. frontosa

Binomial name
- Gonia frontosa Say, 1829

Synonyms
- Gonia basalis Harris, 1835; Gonia philadelphica Macquart, 1844; Gonia tarda Harris, 1835; Knabia hirsuta Townsend, 1915

= Gonia frontosa =

Species of fly

Gonia frontosa is a species of fly in the family Tachinidae.

== Distribution ==
United States, Canada.
