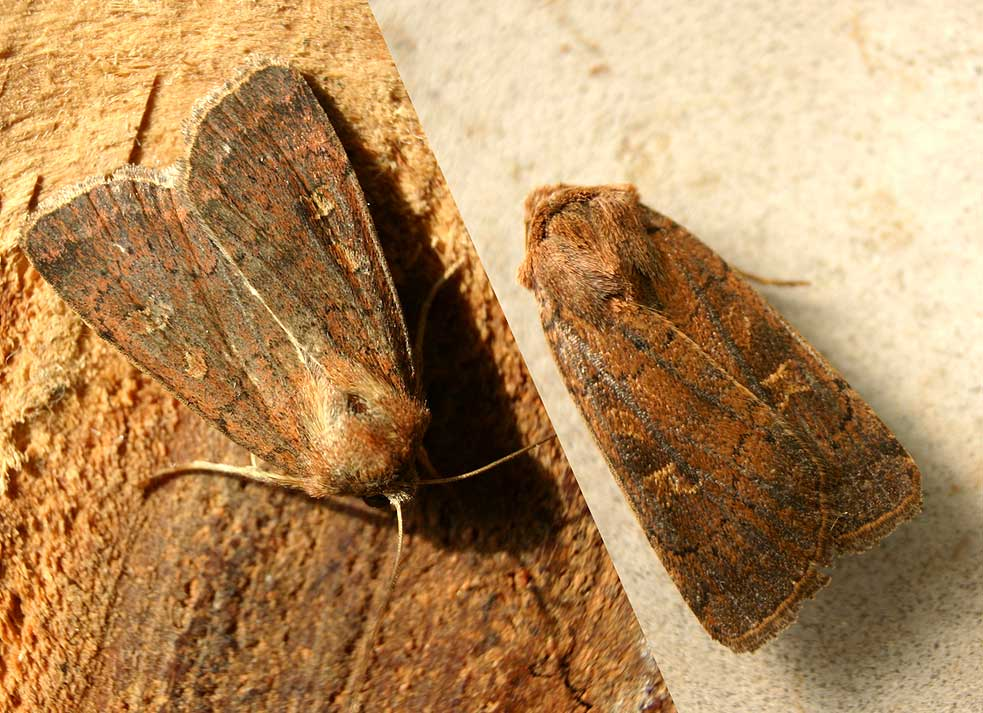

Scientific classification
- Domain: Eukaryota
- Kingdom: Animalia
- Phylum: Arthropoda
- Class: Insecta
- Order: Lepidoptera
- Superfamily: Noctuoidea
- Family: Noctuidae
- Genus: Xestia
- Species: X. xanthographa

Binomial name
- Xestia xanthographa Denis & Schiffermüller, 1775

Synonyms
- Xestia trumani (Smith, 1903)

= Square-spot rustic =

Species of moth

The square-spot rustic (Xestia xanthographa) is a moth of the family Noctuidae. It is found in Europe, North Africa and east across the Palearctic (excluding China) and in North America.

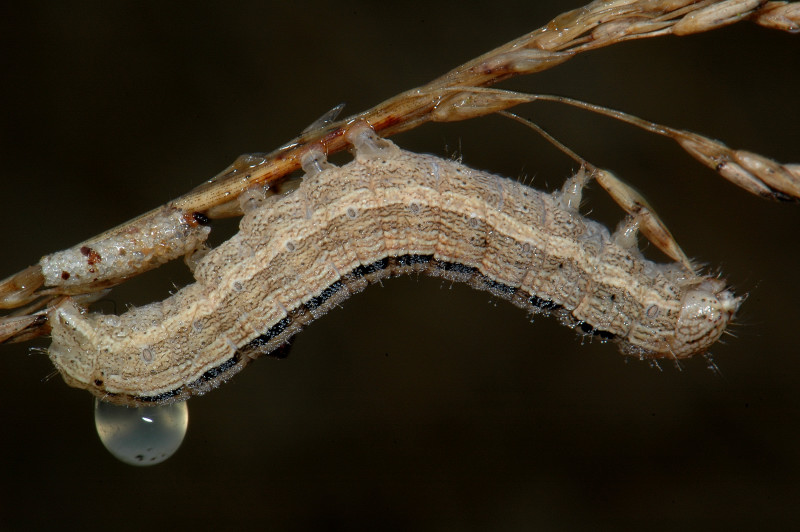
Larva

The species is quite variable in appearance, the forewings occurring in various shades of grey or brown, with melanic forms common in parts of its range. The best identifying feature is the large, pale, squarish stigma which gives the species its common name. The hindwings are pale to dark grey with a whitish fringe. The wingspan is 30–40 mm.

== Technical description and variation ==
Forewing dull brown; the upper stigmata with pale annuli, the reniform sometimes wholly pale, the orbicular round; claviform absent; hindwing ochreous white, suffused with fuscous towards termen only in male, more broadly in female; in ab. budensis Frr. the ground colour is grey; in ab. elutior Alph. the forewings are more brightly coloured, being cinnamon brown or yellowish grey; and in ab. palaestinensis Kalchb. [Now full species Xestia palaestinensis (Kalchberg, 1897)], while the ground colour is paler, all the markings are more distinct. – ab. obscura Tutt and ab. nigra Tutt represent the reddish black and greyish black forms, with stigmata sometimes clear, at others almost obsolete, which occur in the North of Scotland, the hindwing also being blackish; rufescens Tutt and rufa Tutt are merely colour varieties.

== Biology ==
This moth flies at night from July to September and is attracted to light, making it susceptible to light traps, and sugar. It also visits flowers such as heather, marram grass and ragwort. It is found in woodland edges, waste ground and suburban habitats with a distribution that covers most of England.

Larva greenish ochreous, with pale dorsal and subdorsal lines edged with dark; between them a row of oblique marks. The larva feeds on a variety of plants such as bedstraw, oak and willow, as well as various grasses. The species overwinters as a larva, remaining active and feeding throughout.

1. The flight season refers to the British Isles. This may vary in other parts of the range.
