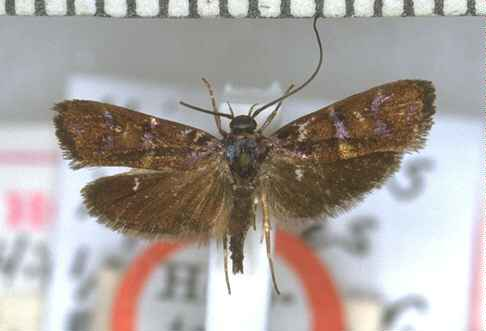

Scientific classification
- Kingdom: Animalia
- Phylum: Arthropoda
- Class: Insecta
- Order: Lepidoptera
- Family: Oecophoridae
- Genus: Hierodoris
- Species: H. iophanes

Binomial name
- Hierodoris iophanes Meyrick, 1912

= Hierodoris iophanes =

Species of moth, endemic to New Zealand

Hierodoris iophanes is a moth of the family Oecophoridae. It was described by Edward Meyrick in 1912. This species can be distinguished from others in its genus by the purple metallic colouration as well as the blue-white mark on its forewings. It is endemic to New Zealand, where it has been recorded from Auckland to Southland. This species inhabits native forest or scrub, with the adults preferring open glades. They are known to be on the wing from November until February and fly during daylight hours, being active on hot sunny days. Larvae feed on the interior of twigs of Prumnopitys ferruginea. The twigs had evidence of oviposition scars of cicadas and the larvae were collected in October after reddish-brown frass indicated their location within the twigs.

== Taxonomy ==
This species was first described by Edward Meyrick in 1912 using a specimen collected in Wellington by George Hudson. It is the type species of the genus Hierodoris. Hudson discussed and illustrated this species in his 1928 book The butterflies and moths of New Zealand. The male holotype specimen is held at the Natural History Museum, London.

== Description ==
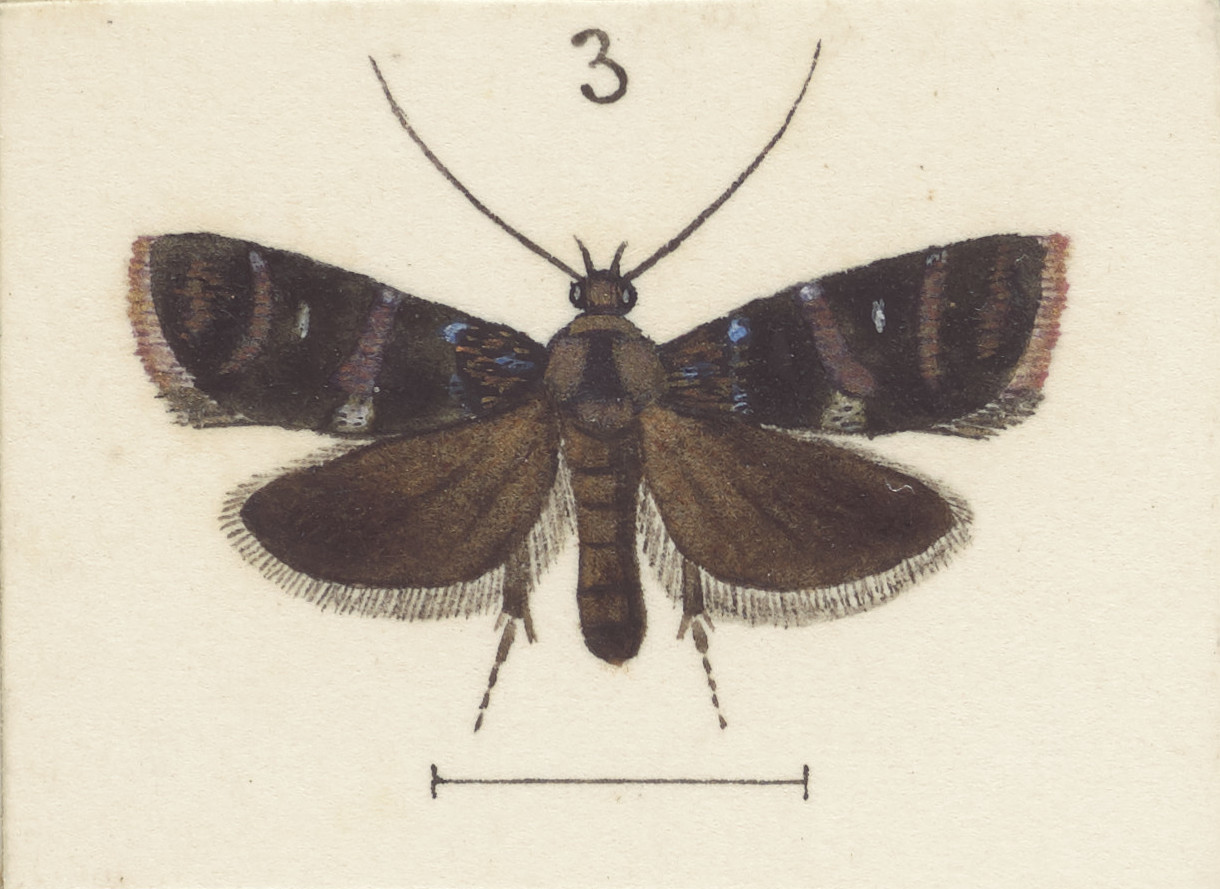
H. iophanes illustrated by George Hudson.

Meyrick described the species as follows:

♂. 13 mm. Head deep bluish-bronze. Palpi bronzy-fiscous. Thorax deep bronze suffused with purple. Antennae and abdomen dark fuscous. Forewings elongate, posteriorly slightly dilated, costa slightly arched, faintly sinuate in middle, apex obtuse, termen rounded, somewhat oblique; dark bronzy-fuscous; a shining purple fascia from base of costa almost to dorsum at 1/4, followed by a spot of blackish suffusion beneath costa, beyond which is a short metallic-blue oblique strigula; a narrow shining purple fascia from a silvery-whitish dot beneath costa before middle to a pale ochreous spot on middle of dorsum; a pale blue-metallic linear mark on end of cell; triangular shining purple spots above and below middle beyond this, their anterior angles tending to meet in disc; an undefined shining purple spot before middle of termen : cilia deep purplish-bronze. Hindwings blackish; cilia fuscous, with blackish basal shade.

The wingspan is 11.5–14 mm for males and 12 mm for females. The forewings are blackish bronze, with a dark metallic purple basal blotch and transverse fasciae. The termen is reflecting purple with a line of bluish white scales from the costa to below the fold. There is a white dot in the disc and the hindwings are blackish brown. This species can be distinguished from others in its genus by the purple metallic colouration as well as the blue-white mark on its forewings.

== Distribution ==
This species is endemic to New Zealand and is known from Auckland down to Southland.

== Behaviour ==
Adults of this species are on the wing from November until February.

== Habitat and hosts ==
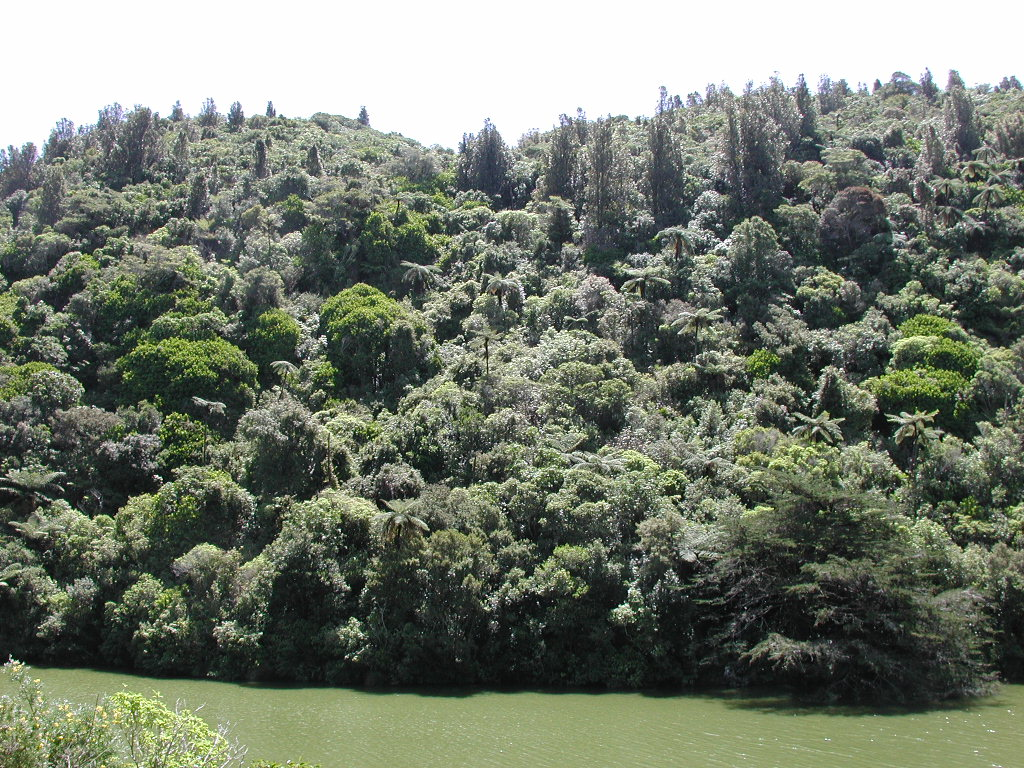
Native bush in Zealandia in Wellington.

This species inhabits native forest or scrub, with the adults preferring open glades. They are known to be on the wing during the daylight hours. They are active on hot sunny days. Larvae have been shown to feed on the interior of twigs of Prumnopitys ferruginea after having been reared from specimens collected in Auckland. The twigs had evidence of oviposition scars of cicadas and the larvae were collected in October. The larvae were discovered by the collector as a reddish-brown frass indicated their location within the twigs.
