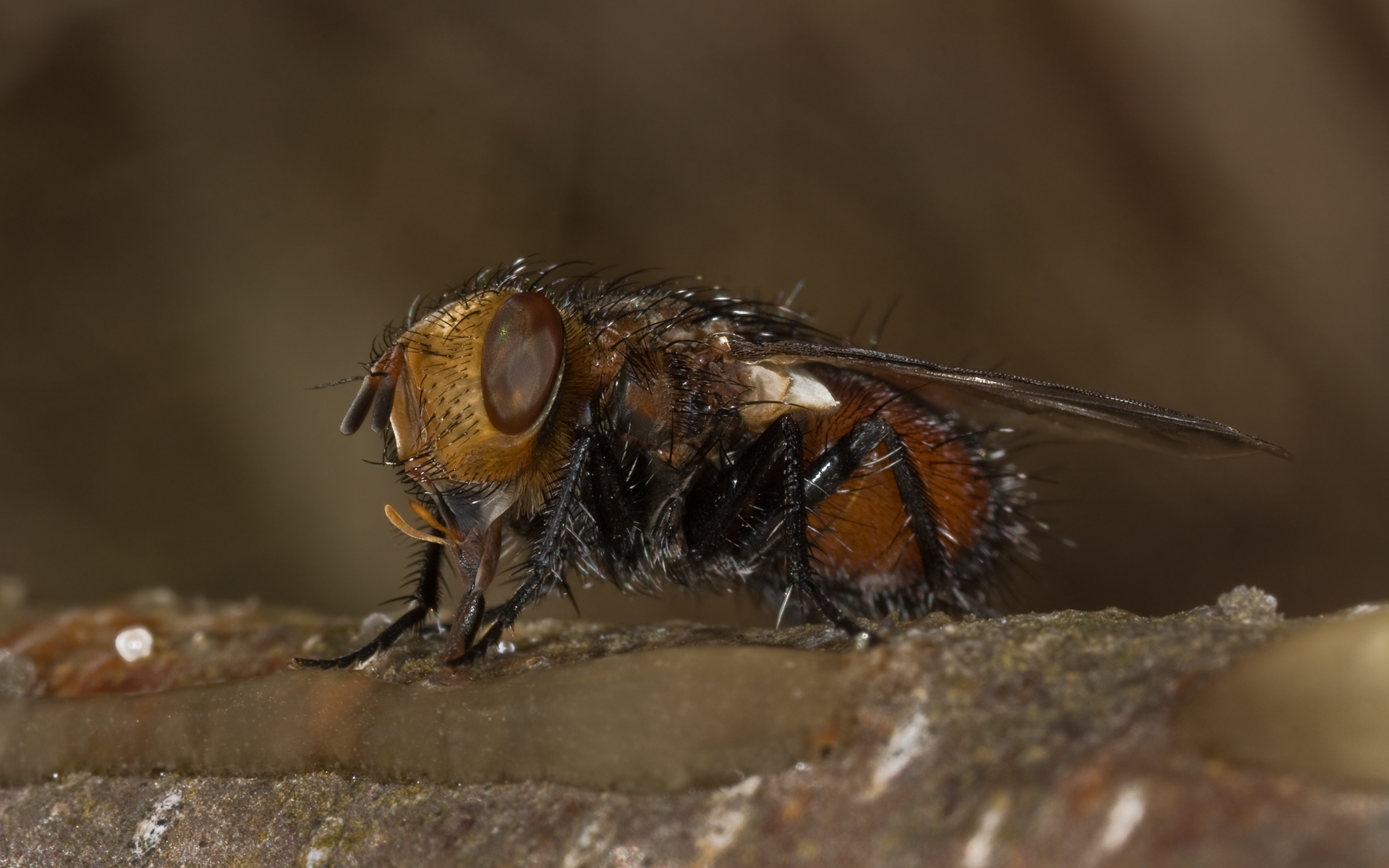
- Gonia capitata

Scientific classification
- Kingdom: Animalia
- Phylum: Arthropoda
- Class: Insecta
- Order: Diptera
- Family: Tachinidae
- Subfamily: Exoristinae
- Tribe: Goniini
- Genus: Gonia
- Species: G. capitata

Binomial name
- Gonia capitata (De Geer, 1776)

Synonyms
- Gonia maritima Perris, 1847; Gonia trifaria Zeller, 1842; Musca capitata De Geer, 1776; Rhedia testacea Robineau-Desvoidy, 1830; Gonia oestroides Walker, 1858

= Gonia capitata =

Species of fly

Gonia capitata is a Palaearctic species of fly in the family Tachinidae.

== Range ==
British Isles, Czech Republic, Estonia, Hungary, Latvia, Poland, Romania, Slovakia, Ukraine, Denmark, Finland, Norway, Sweden, Albania, Bosnia and Herzegovina, Bulgaria, Croatia, Greece, Italy, Macedonia, Serbia, Spain, Austria, Belgium, France, Germany, Switzerland, Iran, Mongolia, Canary Islands, Egypt, Russia, Transcaucasia, China.

== Hosts ==
The larvae of Agrotis and Euxoa obelisca. One record from Ceramica pisi.
