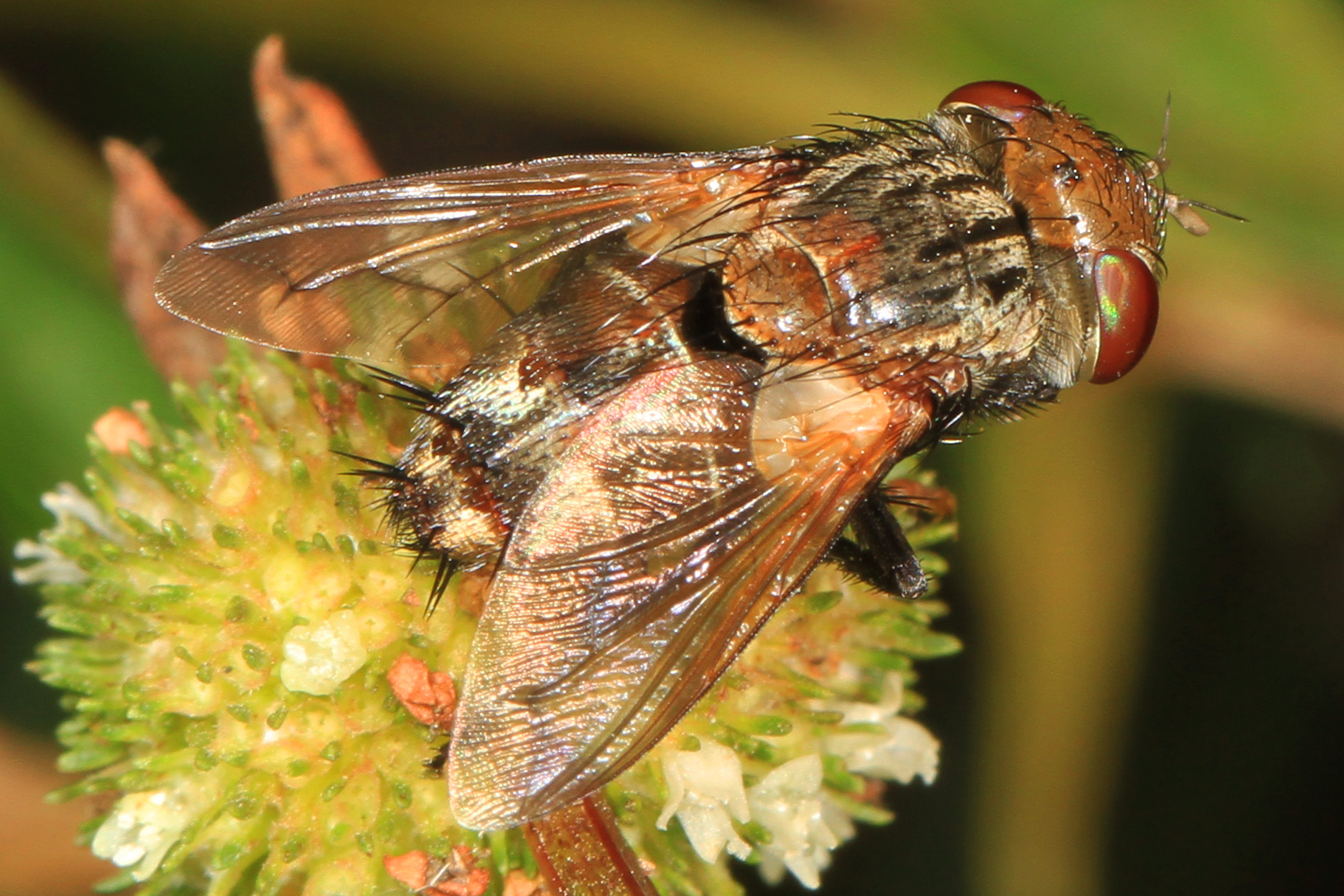
- Gonia crassicornis

Scientific classification
- Kingdom: Animalia
- Phylum: Arthropoda
- Class: Insecta
- Order: Diptera
- Family: Tachinidae
- Subfamily: Exoristinae
- Tribe: Goniini
- Genus: Gonia
- Species: G. crassicornis

Binomial name
- Gonia crassicornis (Fabricius, 1794)

Synonyms
- Gonia angusta Macquart, 1844; Gonia chaetosa Townsend, 1912; Musca crassicornis Fabricius, 1794

= Gonia crassicornis =

Species of fly

Gonia crassicornis is a species of fly in the family Tachinidae.

== Distribution ==
United States, Cuba, Jamaica, Puerto Rico, Trinidad and Tobago, Honduras, Mexico, Nicaragua, Brazil, Colombia, Peru, Venezuela.
