= John Douglas Tothill =

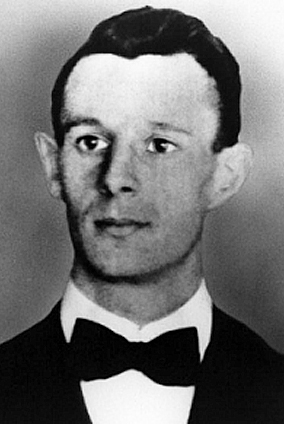

John Douglas Tothill DSc, CMG (February 1888 - 1969 Anstruther), was an English-born entomologist, agriculturalist and civil servant, whose career took him to Canada, Fiji, Uganda and the Sudan. He was the son of Walter Tothill and Frances L. Williams.

He was educated at Blundell's School.

John Douglas Tothill was the first federal forestry official appointed in New Brunswick. He studied at the Ontario Agricultural College, specialising in entomology and botany, and in 1922 received a doctorate from Harvard University. He was employed for a short period by the US Bureau of Entomology Gypsy Moth Parasite laboratory. Tothill later joined the Entomology Branch of the Department of Agriculture and established a laboratory on the University of New Brunswick campus in Fredericton. Over the next decade he led research on invasive insects, such as the brown-tail moth (Euproctis chrysorrhoea), the gypsy moth (Lymantria dispar), and native insects such as the forest tent caterpillar (Malacosoma disstria), the fall webworm (Hyphantria cunea), and the spruce budworm (Choristoneura fumiferana).

In 1923 he was transferred to the Forest Insect Division in Ottawa, and in 1924 was sent to Fiji by the Imperial Bureau of Entomology to study the problematic levuana moth. The moth was finally brought under control by the release of the tachinid fly Bessa remota from Malaysia. In Fiji he soon became the country's director of agriculture, later holding similar posts in Uganda and Sudan. Although he spent only about 12 years in Canada, he is regarded as having established biological pest control in Canada and for placing forestry on a sound scientific footing.

== Publications ==
- The Coconut Moth in Fiji: A History of Its Control by Means of Parasites - Ronald Wood Paine, Thomas Hugh Colebrook Taylor and John Douglas Tothill (1930)
- Report of the Soil Conservation Committee - John Douglas Tothill (1944)
- Agriculture in the Sudan: Being a Handbook of Agriculture As Practised in the Anglo-Egyptian Sudan - John Douglas Tothill (1948)
- A Report on Nineteen Surveys done in Small Agricultural Areas in Uganda - John Douglas Tothill (1938)
- Agriculture in Uganda - John Douglas Tothill (1940)
- Agriculture in the Sudan: Being a Handbook of Agriculture As Practised in the Anglo-Egyptian Sudan - John Douglas Tothill (1948)
- The Natural Control of the Fall Webworm (Hyphantria cunea Drury) in Canada - John Douglas Tothill (1922)

- Memoirs of Life in the Sudan, unpublished manuscript of A Naturalist in the Asir Mountains of Arabia, written 1952-1953

== Family ==
Tothill married Ruby Hughes. On retirement they settled in Anstruther, Fife, in Scotland. Their children were:

- Jessie Elizabeth Tothill, born 1917, Victoria, British Columbia, married William Julius Eggeling (1909-1994).
- John Thomas Tothill, born 1921, Fredericton, Canada.
- Allan Hughes Tothill, born 1922, Fredericton, Canada, married May Davidson.
