= California Association of Winegrape Growers =

The California Association of Winegrape Growers (CAWG) was established in 1974 as an advocate for California's wine grape growers, providing leadership on research and education programs, public policies, sustainable farming practices and trade policy to enhance the California wine grape growing business and communities. According to their website, major objectives of CAWG's advocacy are: improvements in industry statistical data, funding for viticultural research, reform of federal estate tax law, and preventing misleading grape origin and varietal information on wine labels.

Today CAWG represents the growers of more than 60 percent of the gross grape tonnage crushed for wine and concentrate in California.

Since 1995, CAWG and the American Society for Enology and Viticulture (ASEV) have worked together to host the Unified Wine & Grape Symposium, a trade show combined with symposium held every January in Sacramento, California, United States of America.

Karen Ross served as President of the California Association of Winegrape Growers from 1996 to 2009, before becoming Chief of Staff to U.S. Secretary of Agriculture Tom Vilsack, and was subsequently appointed as Secretary of the California Department of Food and Agriculture in January 2011.
