= A. G. Kawamura =

American politician and farmer (born 1955)

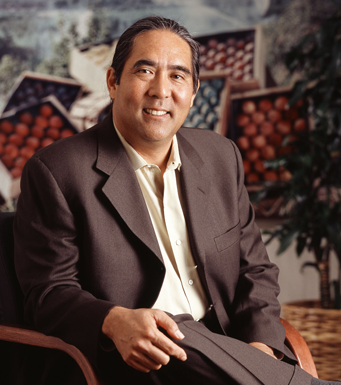
- Official portrait

Secretary of the California Department of Food and Agriculture
- In office November 17, 2003 – December 31, 2010
- Preceded by: Bill J. Lyons, Jr.
- Succeeded by: Karen Ross

Personal details
- Born: Arthur Gen Kawamura; 1955 (age 70–71) Los Angeles, California
- Party: Republican
- Education: University of California, Davis; University of California, Berkeley

Arthur Gen Kawamura (born 1955) is an American politician and farmer who served as the Secretary of the California Department of Food and Agriculture from 2003 to 2010.

== Early life ==
Arthur Gen Kawamura was born in 1955, in Los Angeles, but he grew up in Newport Beach. His grandfather, Arthur Shinji Kawamura, immigrated to the U.S. from Japan in the early 1900s and became one of the first people of Japanese descent to graduate from Santa Ana High School. In the 1940s, he, his son, Genji Gene, and his daughter-in-law, June, were interned at the Gila River War Relocation Center in Arizona. After their release, they bought crops from farmers in Arizona and sold them back in Los Angeles, forming the Western Marketing Company in 1946. The Kawamura family later moved to Orange County in 1958 to take advantage of the strawberry business there.

Kawamura attended the University of California, Davis, originally majoring in agribusiness. He later transferred to the University of California, Berkeley switching his major to English and Spanish comparative literature.

== Career ==
After college, Kawamura wanted to join the Peace Corps and briefly worked as a grape harvester in Bakersfield. He decided to enter his family business, Western Marketing, first by working in the sales and shipping division for eight years. The company's name was changed to Orange County Produce in 1994.

Although Kawamura was not initially focused on politics, his exposure in organizations such as the Western Growers Association led to him having the opportunity to enter it. Kawamura contributed $21,200 to Arnold Schwarzenegger's recall campaign on September 18, 2003. On November 5, Schwarzenegger announced that he had nominated Kawamura to be a part of his cabinet as the Secretary of Food and Agriculture. He was previously chairman of the Western Growers Association, president of the Orange County Farm Bureau, and a member of the California Strawberry Commission.

In 2016, Kawamura was appointed to be a part of Donald Trump's Agricultural Advisory Committee.

== Personal life ==
Kawamura is married to his wife, Diane. They have two children, Derek and Yvonne.
