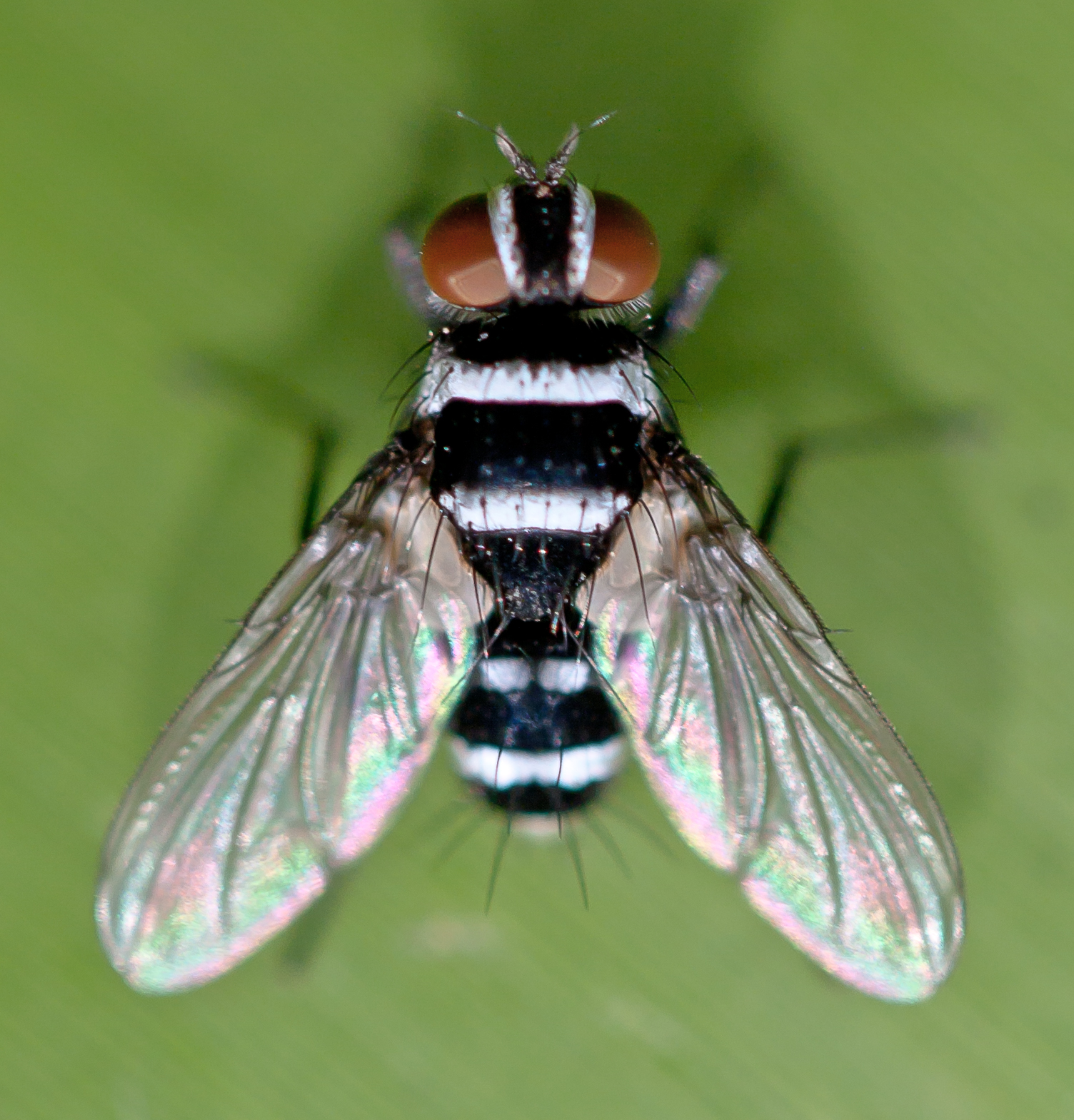

Scientific classification
- Kingdom: Animalia
- Phylum: Arthropoda
- Class: Insecta
- Order: Diptera
- Family: Tachinidae
- Subfamily: Exoristinae
- Tribe: Blondeliini
- Genus: Trigonospila; Pokorny, 1886

Type species
- Trigonospila picta Pokorny, 1886

Synonyms
- Panacemyia Townsend, 1919; Zosteromyia Brauer & Bergenstamm, 1891; Zosteromyiopsis Townsend, 1933; Succingulum Pandellé, 1894; Gymnamedoria Townsend, 1927; Nimiocauda Reinhard, 1943

= Trigonospila =

Genus of flies

Trigonospila is a small genus of parasitic flies in the family Tachinidae.

== Distribution ==
The genus has a worldwide distribution, but is particularly common in Australia. In Australia, T. brevifacies and T. cingulata are common within their respective ranges and can often be found resting on vegetation. They have been reported in some environments to be the most common conspicuous fly species. In Australia, Trigonospila have been collected in all mainland states and territories, Tasmania, and some large offshore islands including Kangaroo Island in South Australia, and Brampton Island in Queensland.

== Identification ==
Trigonospila are strikingly patterned flies; primarily black with pearly whitish to golden transverse bars on the thorax and abdomen. There are two whitish bars on the thorax; one adjacent to the transverse suture, and the second adjacent to the scutellum. There may also be a white triangle on the tip of the scutellum, and the subscutellum is usually white. Abdominal colouration varies between species however it is typical that there are three whitish bars on the abdomen; one at the anterior margin of each the third, fourth, and fifth abdominal tergites. The width of these bars differs between species.

== Biocontrol applications ==
T. brevifacies is a polyphagous parasitoid of the larvae of Lepidoptera and is native to the eastern states of Australia with a range extending from Tasmania to southern Queensland and possibly as far west as South Australia. T. brevifacies has been deployed in New Zealand as a biocontrol agent of a number of agricultural pests including the light brown apple moth Epiphyas postvittana (Lepidoptera : Tortricidae) and the potato tuber moth Phthorimaea operculella (Lepidoptera : Gelechiidae).

T. cingulata and T. fasciata are believed to be parasitoids of chrysomelid beetles in the genus Paropsis, some of which may be pests of agriculture or forestry.

== Species ==
- Trigonospila bimaculata (Villeneuve, 1935)
- Trigonospila braueri (Townsend, 1933)
- Trigonospila brevifacies (Hardy, 1934)
- Trigonospila cingulata (Macquart, 1851)
- Trigonospila edwinbermudezi Fleming & Wood, 2015
- Trigonospila erilis (Reinhard, 1943)
- Trigonospila exigua (Villeneuve, 1935)
- Trigonospila fasciata (Hardy, 1934)
- Trigonospila integra (Villeneuve, 1935)
- Trigonospila josemariamoragai Fleming & Wood, 2015
- Trigonospila ludio (Zetterstedt, 1849)
- Trigonospila melaleuca (Wulp, 1890)
- Trigonospila mista (Villeneuve, 1913)
- Trigonospila pallipes (Reinhard, 1953)
- Trigonospila panamensis (Townsend, 1919)
- Trigonospila prasius Mesnil, 1977
- Trigonospila transvittata (Pandellé, 1896)
- Trigonospila trinitatis (Thompson, 1963)
- Trigonospila unicaldasi Vinasco, Vallejo & Soto, 2017
- Trigonospila uniformis Fleming & Wood, 2015
- Trigonospila verticalis (Reinhard, 1953)
- Trigonospila vittigera (Coquillett, 1898)
