= Mating disruption =

Insect pest management technique

Mating disruption (MD), also known as sexual confusion, is a pest management technique designed to control certain insect pests by introducing artificial stimuli that confuse the individuals and disrupt mate localization and/or courtship, thus preventing mating and blocking the reproductive cycle. It usually involves the use of synthetic sex pheromones, although other approaches, such as interfering with vibrational communication, are also being developed.

== History ==
Confusion sexuelle, or mating disruption, was first discussed by the Institut national de la recherche agronomique in 1974 in Bordeaux, France.

Winemakers in France, Switzerland, Spain, Germany, and Italy were the first to use the method to treat vines against the larvae of the moth genus Cochylis.

== Mechanism ==
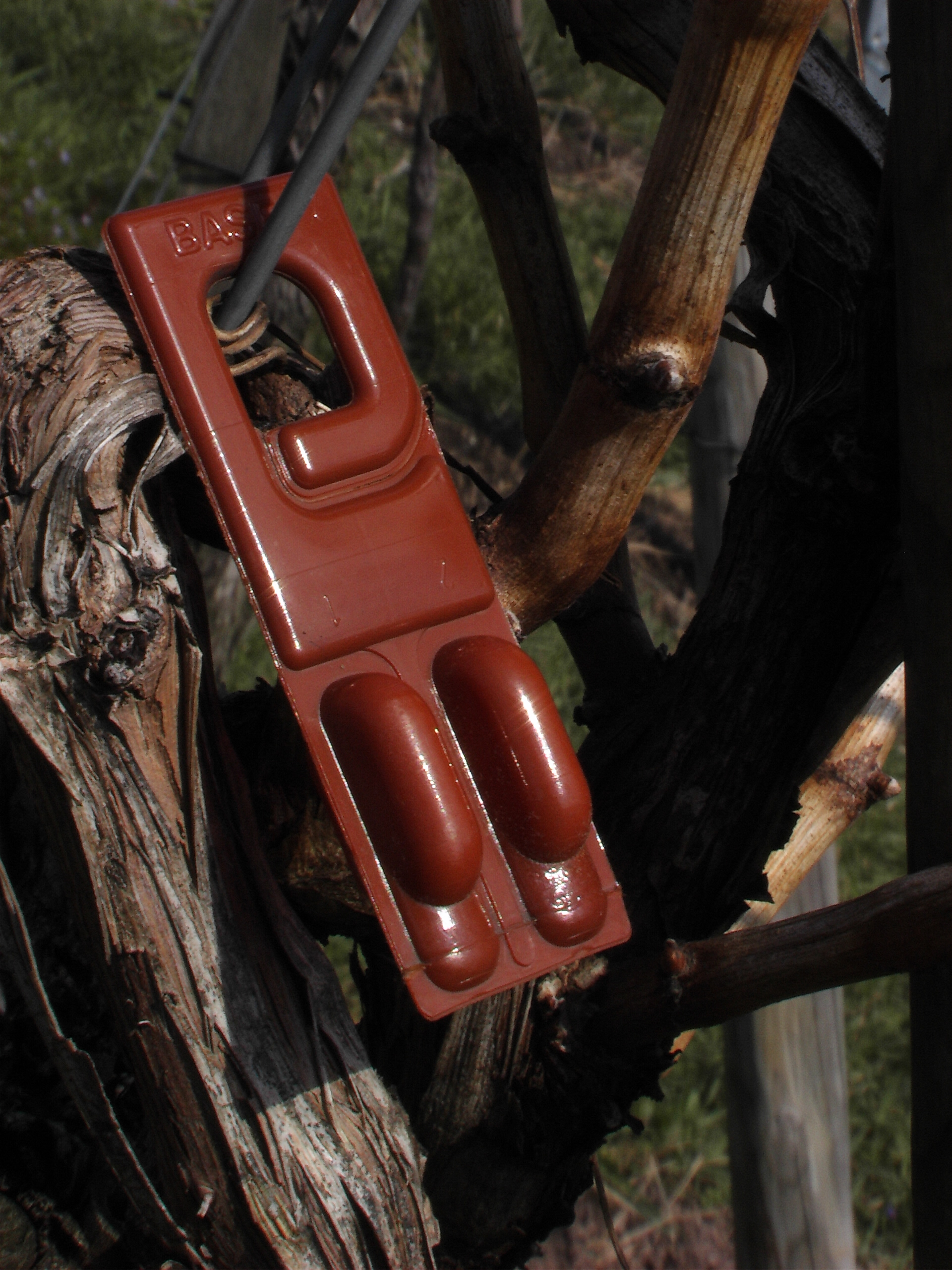
A synthetic pheromone dispenser placed in a vineyard for mating disruption of moths

In many insect species of interest to agriculture, such as those in the order Lepidoptera, females emit an airborne trail of a specific chemical blend constituting that species' sex pheromone. This aerial trail is referred to as a pheromone plume.

Males of that species use the information contained in the pheromone plume to locate the emitting female (known as a “calling” female). Mating disruption exploits the male insects' natural response to follow the plume by introducing a synthetic pheromone into the insects’ habitat. The synthetic pheromone is a volatile organic chemical designed to mimic the species-specific sex pheromone produced by the female insect. The general effect of mating disruption is to confuse the male insects by masking the natural pheromone plumes, causing the males to follow “false pheromone trails” at the expense of finding mates, and affecting the males’ ability to respond to “calling" females. Consequently, the male population experiences a reduced probability of successfully locating and mating with females, which leads to the eventual cessation of breeding and collapse of the insect infestation.

Mechanisms of disruption

Researchers distinguish two broad mechanisms by which mating disruption can act on moth populations: competitive disruption, in which synthetic pheromone sources compete with calling females for the attention of males (an effect that is density-dependent and tends to plateau as more dispensers are added), and non-competitive disruption, in which the male's sensory or behavioural response to pheromone is itself impaired, for example, through sensory desensitisation or camouflage of the natural plume, an effect that is not linked to pest density. A 2025 study by entomologist Dr Vernon Murray Steyn and colleagues on the false codling moth (Thaumatotibia leucotreta), a major agricultural pest in Africa, found that disruption of this species followed a "hybrid" profile: males were disrupted competitively at low pheromone dosages, but disruption shifted to a non-competitive mechanism at higher dosages (800 dispensers per hectare and above), which coincided with a jump to 96–99% mating disruption in stone fruit and table grape orchards. The same study found that clustering dispensers into as few as 36 release points per hectare achieved disruption levels statistically indistinguishable from 800 uniformly distributed dispensers, indicating the number of pheromone sources could be reduced substantially without loss of efficacy once non-competitive disruption was achieved. The mechanism underlying disruption also has practical implications for the cost of application. Because competitively disrupted species require pheromone sources to be numerous and well-distributed to compete effectively with calling females, reducing the number of release points in these species tends to reduce disruption efficacy, for example, clustering 200 dispensers per hectare into 18 release points reduced disruption of light brown apple moth (Epiphyas postvittana), a competitively disrupted species, by roughly 10% compared to uniform distribution. By contrast, Steyn et al. found that once false codling moth disruption shifted to a non-competitive mechanism at higher dosages, the number of pheromone release points could be reduced substantially (from 800 individually distributed dispensers to as few as 36 clustered release sites per hectare) without a significant loss of disruption, since non-competitive disruption does not depend on pheromone sources competing with females for male attention.

The California Department of Pesticide Regulation, the California Department of Food and Agriculture, and the United States Environmental Protection Agency consider mating disruption to be among the most environmentally friendly treatments used to eradicate pest infestations. Mating disruption works best if large areas are treated with pheromones. Ten acres is a good minimum size for a successful MD program, but larger areas are preferable.^{[2]}

== Advantages of mating disruption ==
Pheromone programs are most effective when controlling low to moderate pest population densities. MD has also been identified as a pest control method in which the insect does not become resistant^{[1]}. The scientific community, together with governmental agencies throughout the world, understands the benefits of mating disruption using species-specific sex pheromones, and consider sex-pheromone-based insect control programs among the most environmentally friendly treatments to be used to manage and control insect pest populations. Insect pheromone has been successfully used as an effective tool to slow the spread and to eradicate pests from very large areas in the US, notably to control the spongy moth (Lymantria dispar), a devastating forestry pest, and to eradicate the boll weevil and pink bollworm, two of the most damaging pest of cotton. Contrary to conventional pesticide-based control methods, which kill insects directly, mating disruption confuses male insects from accurately locating a mating partner, leading to the eventual collapse of the mating cycle^{[3]}. Mating disruption, due to the specificity of the sex pheromone of the insect species, has the benefit of only affecting the males of that species, while leaving other non target species unaffected^{[3]}. This allows for very targeted pest management, promoting the suppression of a single pest species, leaving the populations of beneficial insects (pollinators and natural enemies) intact. Mating disruption, like most pest management strategies, is a useful technique, but should not be considered a stand-alone treatment program^{[1]} for it targets only a single species in plant production systems that usually have several pests of concern. Mating disruption is a valuable tool that should be used in Integrated Pest Management (IPM) programs.

Pheromone programs have been used for several decades around the globe and to date (2009) there is no documented public health evidence to suggest that agricultural use of synthetic pheromones is harmful to humans or to any other non-target species. However, continuing research is being conducted.

== Disadvantages of mating disruption ==
Over the decades that pheromone pest programs have been used several disadvantages have been argued when compared to the use of conventional pesticides. Most pheromones target a single species, so a specific mating disruption formulation controls only the species that uses that pheromone blend; whereas pesticides usually kill indiscriminately a plethora of species, including multiple species with a single application. Some synthetic pheromones have high developmental and production costs, causing the mating disruption technique to be too costly to be adopted by conventional commercial growers. Furthermore most commercial pheromone mating disruption formulations must be applied by hand, which can be an expensive and time consuming. Novel pheromone formulations recently developed to be mechanically applied provide long lasting mating disruption effects (e.g., depending on the target pest a single application of SPLAT controls the target pest for a complete reproductive cycle, or for the entire season. In addition, also sprayable methods such as the lithos micro dispenser technology allow an easy application with all kinds of spraying devices and offer the additional benefit of long duration efficacies. These are due to a slow release function of the pheromones by combining them with a natural formulation based on a mineral carrier.

== Methods of dispersal ==
=== Microencapsulated pheromones ===
Microencapsulated pheromones (MECs) are small droplets of pheromone enclosed within polymer capsules. The capsules control the release rate of the pheromone into the surrounding environment. The capsules are small enough to be applied in the same method as used to spray insecticides. The effective field longevity of the microencapsulated pheromone formulations ranges from a few days to slightly more than a week, depending on climatic conditions, capsule size and chemical properties^{[1]}. Microcapsules in the pheromone formulations are usually kept above a prescribed diameter to avoid the risk of inhalation by humans.

=== Hand applied dispensers ===
- Hollow tube dispensers are plastic twist-tie type dispensers, plastic hollow fibers or plastic hollow microfibers fibers, filled with synthetic sex pheromone and placed throughout the area to be protected.
- Pheromone Baits and Stations are a stationary, attract and kill type of dispensers. Some are relatively large platform, containing a pheromone lure inside a glue board that ensnares the attracted insect. Other pheromone bait stations contain a pheromone lure in conjunction with a surface containing a dose of insecticide that reduces the attracted insect's fitness, thus reducing its ability to mate and reproduce.
- High-emission dispensers There are several very high dose pheromone dispensers, some do it passively, like pheromone sachets and large dollops of SPLAT pheromone formulations, others do it be actively releasing bursts of sex pheromone at timed intervals.

=== Monolithic Flowable dispensers ===
A pheromone delivery concept using a flowable formulation to create long lasting monolithic pheromone dispensers has been brought to the market in the past decade. These novel SPLAT pheromone mating disruption formulations may provide effective season long suppression effect (e.g., depending on the target pest a single application of SPLAT controls the target pest for a complete reproductive cycle, or for the entire season) and can be manually or mechanically applied. Although mechanical dispersal techniques require specialized off-the-shelf application technology and/or equipment, once the application system is made to work, it allows protection of extensive areas using pheromones. A purported benefit of SPLAT is that the dollop anchors where it lands, avoiding unwanted drift of the formulation once applied in the field. Furthermore, depending on the mode of application, the cured dollops are later able to be retrieved.

=== Sprayable dispensers based on mineral powders ===
Recently, specially micronized natural minerals are also being used as carriers for pheromones, combining easy application (through sprayability) with long-lasting effectiveness (through slow release). This technology also makes it possible, to use significantly smaller quantities of pheromones, resulting in a relative cost advantage.

=== Aerial (sprayable) dispersal ===
In November 2007, a cont(sial approac)to spray microencapsulated, LBAM pheromone in urban and rural areas of the counties of Santa Cruz and Monterey California to combat the invasive light brown apple moth. Usually the effect of disruption of orientation of the male moths to females (or monitoring pheromone traps) can be detected by the reduction in moth capture in monitoring pheromone traps. The government campaign using areawide aerial microencapsulated pheromone applications failed to show any sign of mating disruption on the light brown apple moth populations in the treated area. It was found that the first aerial campaign was performed using an incomplete (the wrong) pheromone blend of the light brown apple moth (the wrong blend decreased tremendously the likelihood of success of the mating disruption program), and the LBAM microencapsulated formulation was untested, and finally, microencapsule formulations are notoriously known for their short field life, weak and erratic performance. Furthermore it is possible that the LBAM microencapsulated formulation used in the government campaign was unfit for aerial delivery in urban areas; although pheromone is safe, the formulation used had microcapsules of very small diameter which made it into a possible inhalation hazard that seems to be linked to an increase in allergenic reactions of the population in the target area. This set of LBAM mating disruption aerial applications done by the government has created tremendous dissent of the public in general as well as of several sectors of the scientific community. Now, several years later, the affected communities as well as the nascent US pheromone industry (which provides safer, yet very effective, alternatives to the use of conventional pesticides) are still suffering the ripple effects of these disastrous Bay Area LBAM eradication campaigns.

But there are numerous, successful pest suppression programs that rely on aerial dispersal of pheromone mating disruptants. One of the largest pheromone mating disruption programs in the globe is Slow the Spread. Slow the Spread has been implemented across the 1,200-mile (1,900 km) spongy moth frontier from Wisconsin to North Carolina. The program area is located ahead of the advancing front of the spongy moth population. The STS program focuses on early detection and suppression of the low–level populations along this advancing front, disrupting the natural progress of population buildup and spread. Every year hundreds of thousands of acres are aerially sprayed with two pheromone spongy moth pheromone mating disruption formulations, Flakes and SPLAT. A single mating disruption formulation application promotes season-long suppression of spongy moth in the treated areas. With a crew of 8 people it was possible to aerially treat with SPLAT GM over 20,000 acres (81 km^{2}) of forest in a single day. The consortium of Federal and State participants have been able to do the following:

• decrease the new territory invaded by the spongy moth each year from 15,600 square miles (40,000 km^{2}) to 6,000 square miles (16,000 km^{2});

• protect forests, forest–based industries, urban and rural parks, and private property; and

• avoid at least $22 million per year in damage and management costs.

It seems that the success of the Slow the Spread program is related to well planned campaigns, which involves communication, transparency and clarity of objectives: in advance to an application STS holds meetings that include the area population in general, concerned citizens, public officials, scientists and technical personnel to discuss strategies of management of spongy moths in the areas of concern. There is a movement requesting that new government invasive species eradication campaigns model their pest suppression actions on the existing successful suppression programs like STS, and embrace a more effective policy of communication, transparency and clarity of objectives. With the involvement and education of the public, areawide eradication campaigns will be better planned and more able to deliver decisive end effective pest eradication actions.

== See also ==
- Integrated pest management
- Pest (organism)
- Pesticide
- Pheromones
- Codling moth
