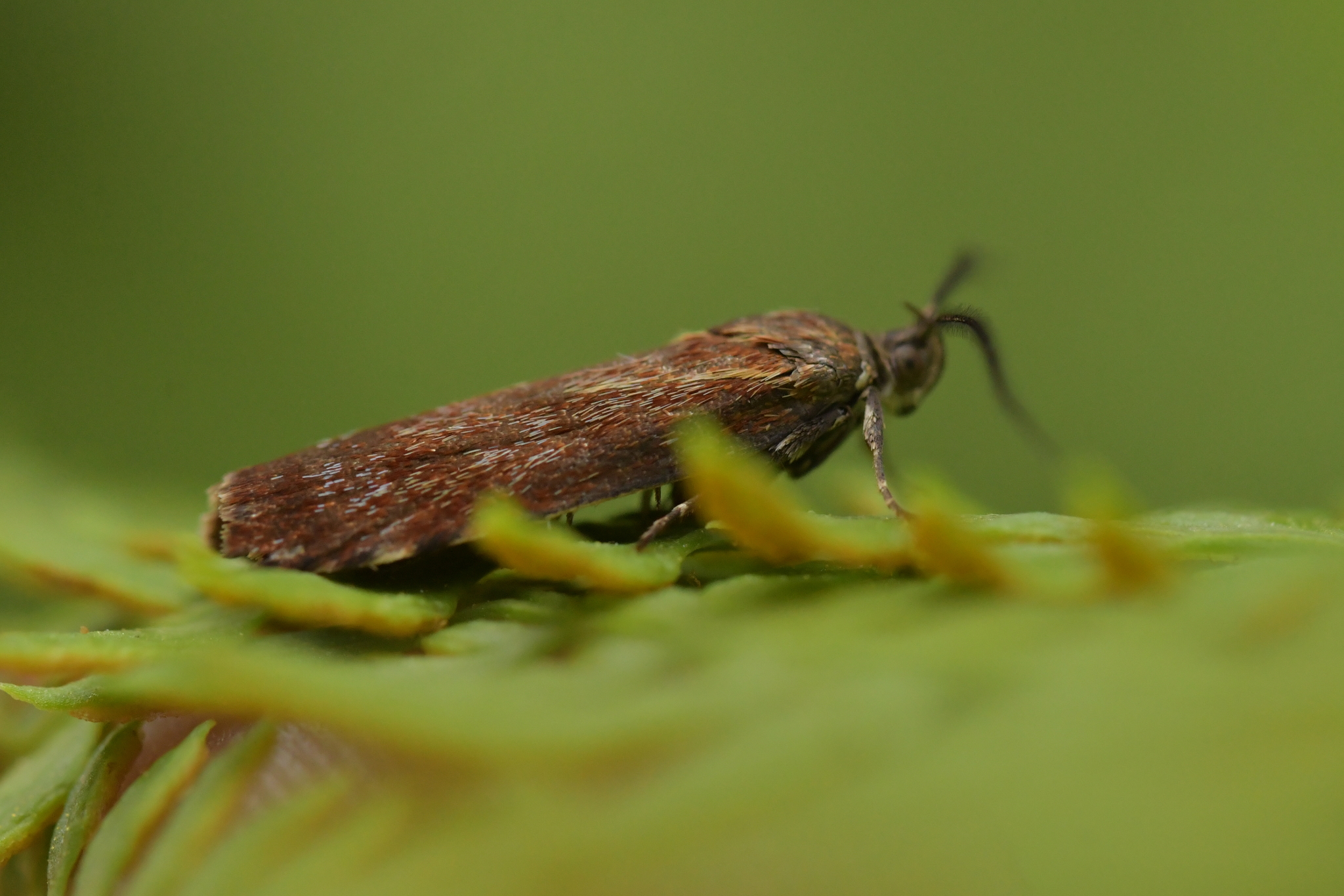

Scientific classification
- Kingdom: Animalia
- Phylum: Arthropoda
- Class: Insecta
- Order: Lepidoptera
- Family: Oecophoridae
- Genus: Hierodoris
- Species: H. atychioides

Binomial name
- Hierodoris atychioides (Butler, 1877)

Synonyms
- Tachyptilia atychioides Butler, 1877; Heliostibes atychioides (Butler, 1877); Heliostibes gregalis Philpott, 1928; Heliostibes barbarica Philpott, 1930

= Hierodoris atychioides =

Species of moth endemic to New Zealand

Hierodoris atychioides (also known as the gregarious tineid) is a moth of the family Oecophoridae. It was described by Arthur Gardiner Butler in 1877. The female holotype specimen held at the Natural History Museum, London. This species is endemic to New Zealand, and can be found in the North, South and Stewart Islands. The larvae form webs of silk attached to frass and leaves on their hosts in which they shelter, often in the company of other larvae in their species. Their feeding habits have not been observed in detail but Hoare hypothesises the larvae may feed on dead or dying leaves. The larvae feed on a wide range of trees and shrubs, including Dacrydium cupressinum, Prumnopitys taxifolia, Dacrycarpus dacrydioides, Libocedrus bidwillii, Cupressus macrocarpa, Leptospermum scoparium, Kunzea ericoides, Ozothamnus leptophyllus, Abies, Picea, Pinus and Thuja species. Although they are regarded as a pest of exotic forests in New Zealand, the economic damage the larvae cause is minimal and they tend to be controlled only by their natural enemies. Larval enemies include the parasitic flies Trigonospila brevifacies and Pales funesta as well as parasitic wasps including Xanthopimpla rhopaloceros. The adult moths are day flying and are most common during the months of December and January. This species is variable in appearance as larvae, pupa and as adults, and it has been hypothesised that it is in the process of speciation.

== Taxonomy ==
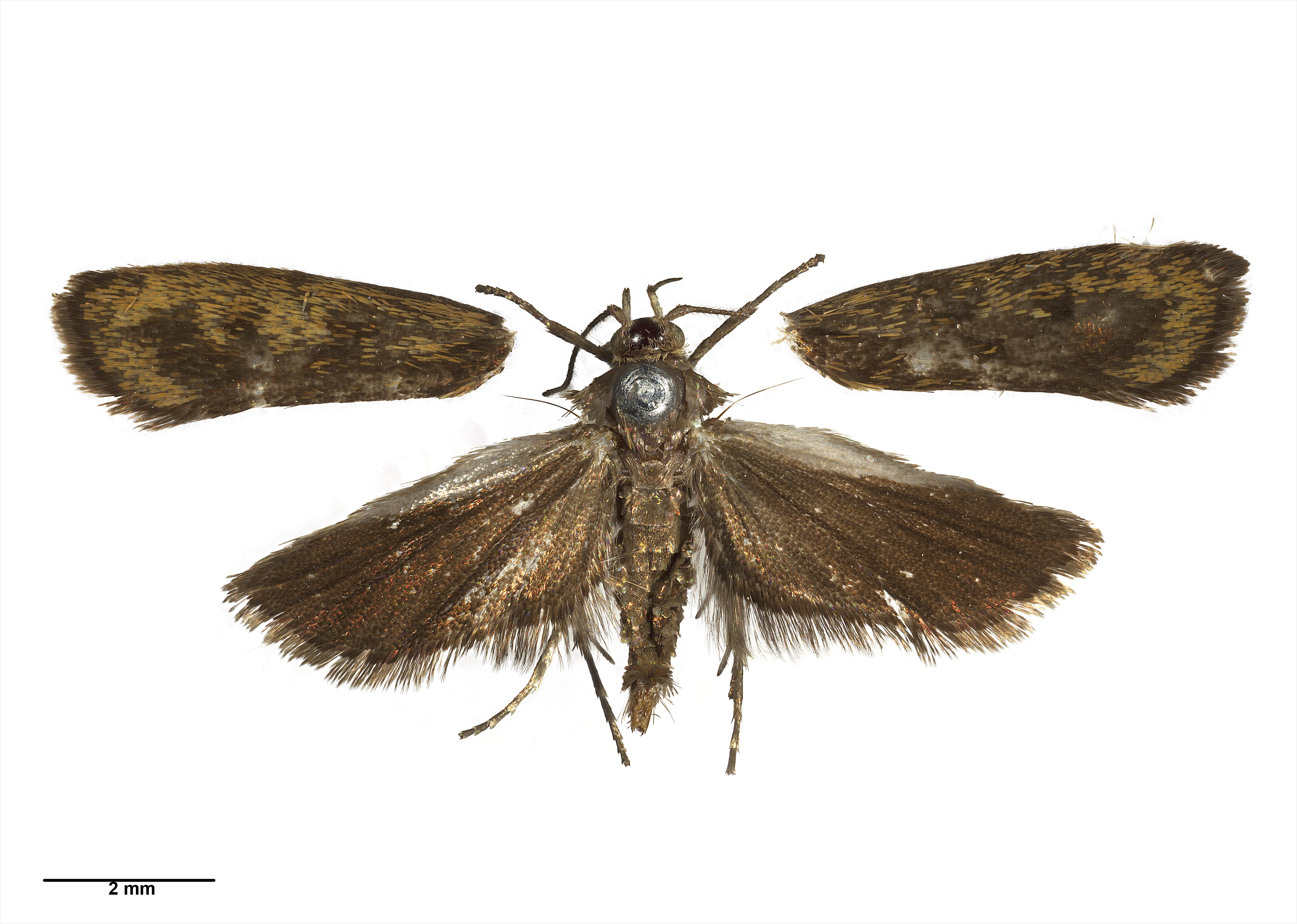
Hierodoris barbarica, now synonymised with H. atychioides, AMNZ21768

This species was first described by Arthur Gardiner Butler in 1877 and named Tachyptilia atychioides. Butler used specimens sourced from James Hector (who collected in Dunedin) and John Davies Enys (who collected in Christchurch) but did not state a type locality. In 1888 Edward Meyrick placed this species within the Heliostibes genus. In 1939 George Hudson synonymised both Heliostibes gregalis and Heliostibes barbarica with H. atychoioides. In 1988 J. S. Dugdale placed this species within the genus Hierodoris. This placement was confirmed by Robert Hoare in 2005. The female holotype specimen is held at the Natural History Museum, London.

== Description ==
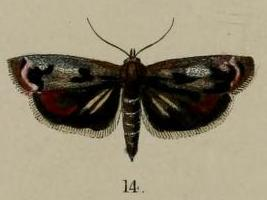
Illustration accompanying the first description of this species

M. K. Kay described the larvae of this species as follows:

Mature caterpillars are about 15 mm long and generally brown in colour although some may be quite light. The head is brown with black markings and immediately behind the head the upper surface of the next two segments is shiny, hardened and black. A white stripe extends along the back from the head to the last abdominal segment and separates paired brown spots on each segment. On dark specimens along each side there is also a pair of irregular whitish lines with dark spots between. Segments without legs have four brown spots on the underside.

Butler described the adults of the species as follows:

Primaries above purplish brown; discoidai cell white, crossed by a large central subquadrate black spot, terminated by a smaller black spot; a small white spot beyond the cell, and a discal arched white line; apex bronzy brown; fringe brown, whitish towards apex; secondaries coppery brown, two sordid whitish longitudinal and fringe white, the latter brownish at anal angle; body above dark brown, collar and prothorax varied with ochraceous; hind margins of tegulae fringed with whitish; abdomen with whitish hind margins to the segments : primaries below bronzy-brown, pale towards the base, crossed towards apex by a series of ill-defined whitish dots, fringe greyish; secondaries sordid white, shining, clouded (excepting at apex and outer border) with grey; body below pearly whitish; tibiae and tarsi of legs above banded with black.

The wingspan of the adults of this species is between 14 and 20 mm. The hindwings are dark brown.

It can be distinguished from H. callispora as it does not have the metallic head and thorax of that species. It is also different in appearance from H. gerontion as H. atychoioides has a hindwing with less white on it and a smooth labial palp. Finally it is a smaller moth that the dark forms of H. illita and does not have the pale streaks on that species' hind wings. H. atychoioides is variable in appearance as a larva, pupa and as an adult. Depending on the larval host, the adults of this species can show distinct differences in wing pattern as well as in their size. For example, if the larvae have been reared on rimu the adults can have a small reddish-marked appearance where as if reared on Libocedrus bidwillii larvae can produce a larger reddish adult moth. As a result of this, it has been hypothesised that this species may be in the process of speciation. However it has also been argued that the currently differences in appearance merge gradually from one to another in a continuous series and cannot be morphologically separated and therefore do not yet merit taxonomic separation.

== Distribution ==
This species is endemic to New Zealand and is found throughout the North, South and Stewart Islands. However this species is regarded as being uncommon in Christchurch.

== Behaviour ==
The larvae form webs of silk attached to frass and the leaves of their hosts in which they shelter, often in the company of other larvae in their species. Their feeding habits have not been observed in detail but Hoare hypothesises the larvae may feed on dead or dying leaves. The larvae will attempt to withdraw further into its shelter or alternatively will fall to the ground if disturbed. Once the larva is mature it pupates within its silken nest and then takes three weeks to metamorphosise. This species appears to have an annual life cycle. The adult moth is day flying and is most common during the months of December and January.

== Hosts ==
The larvae feed on a wide range of trees and shrubs, including Dacrydium cupressinum, Prumnopitys taxifolia, Dacrycarpus dacrydioides, Libocedrus bidwillii, Cupressus macrocarpa, Leptospermum scoparium, Kunzea ericoides, Ozothamnus leptophyllus, Abies, Picea, Pinus and Thuja species.

== Enemies ==
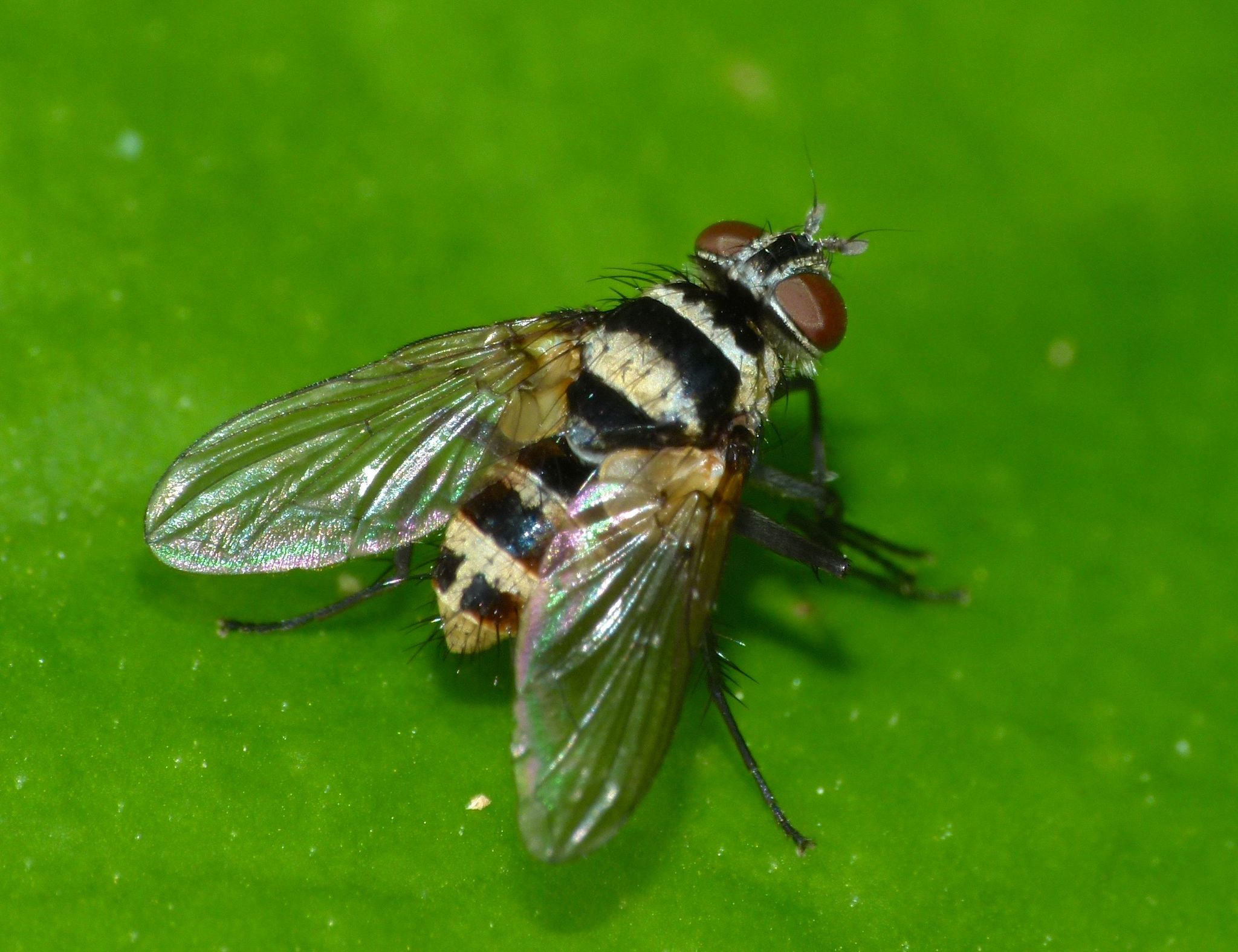
Trogonospila brevifacies

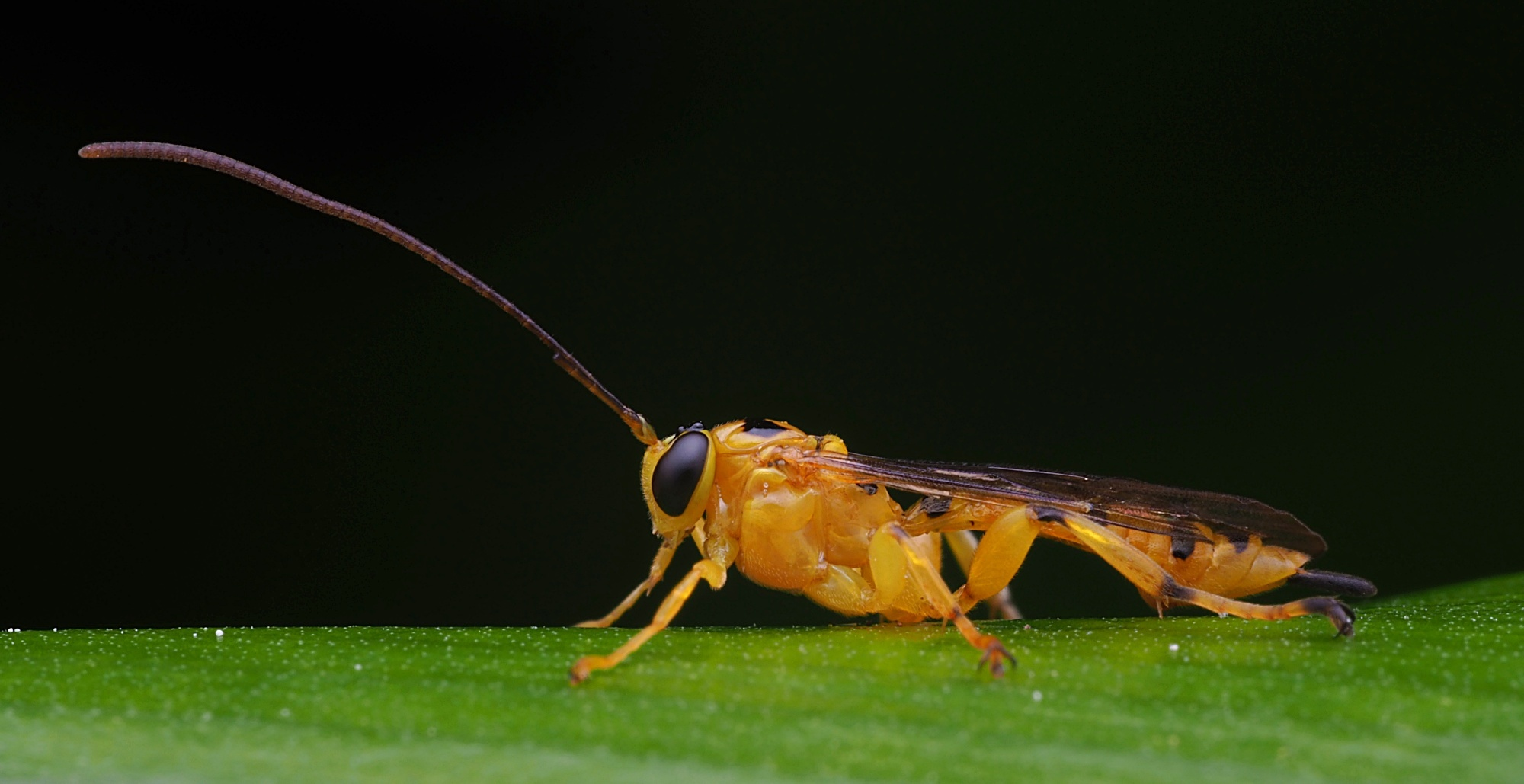
Xanthopimpla rhopaloceros

The larvae of this species are susceptible to both fungal disease and parasitic insects. Both Trigonospila brevifacies and Pales funesta, two species of fly, are known to parasitize H. atychioides. H. atychioides are also parasitized by the wasp Xanthopimpla rhopaloceros, as well as wasp species in the Campoplex, Aucklandella and Goniozus genera. It has been hypothesised that these natural parasites as well as wasps introduced as biocontrol agents may have caused the scarcity of this moth in Christchurch.

== Interactions with humans ==
Although this species is regarded as a pest of exotic forests in New Zealand, because the damage it does is limited, it is normally controlled by its natural enemies rather than by chemicals. However this species can cause ornamental plants to be defoliated and as a result gardeners may resort to spraying insecticide to kill the feeding larvae.
