= Trigonospila fasciata =

Scientific classification
- Kingdom: Animalia
- Phylum: Arthropoda
- Clade: Pancrustacea
- Class: Insecta
- Order: Diptera
- Family: Tachinidae
- Subfamily: Exoristinae
- Tribe: Blondeliini
- Genus: Trigonospila
- Species: T. fasciata

Binomial name
- Trigonospila fasciata (Hardy, 1934)

Synonyms
- Zosteromyia fasciata Hardy, 1934

Species of fly

Trigonospila fasciata is a species of fly in the family Tachinidae.

== Distribution ==
Trigonospila fasciata is a common species in Tasmania, and may be present in Victoria.
