= Unified Wine & Grape Symposium =

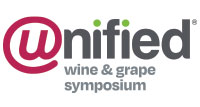
Unified Wine & Grape Symposium Logo

The Unified Wine & Grape Symposium (UWGS) is an annual wine and grape industry event, held every January in Sacramento, California, United States of America. Since 1995 the American Society for Enology and Viticulture (ASEV) and the California Association of Winegrape Growers (CAWG) have worked together to develop the trade show combined with symposium. The Unified Symposium also hosts a trade show with over 650 vendors displaying their products and services to the more than 14,000 people who attend annually.

Trade show floor of the Unified Wine & Grape Symposium
