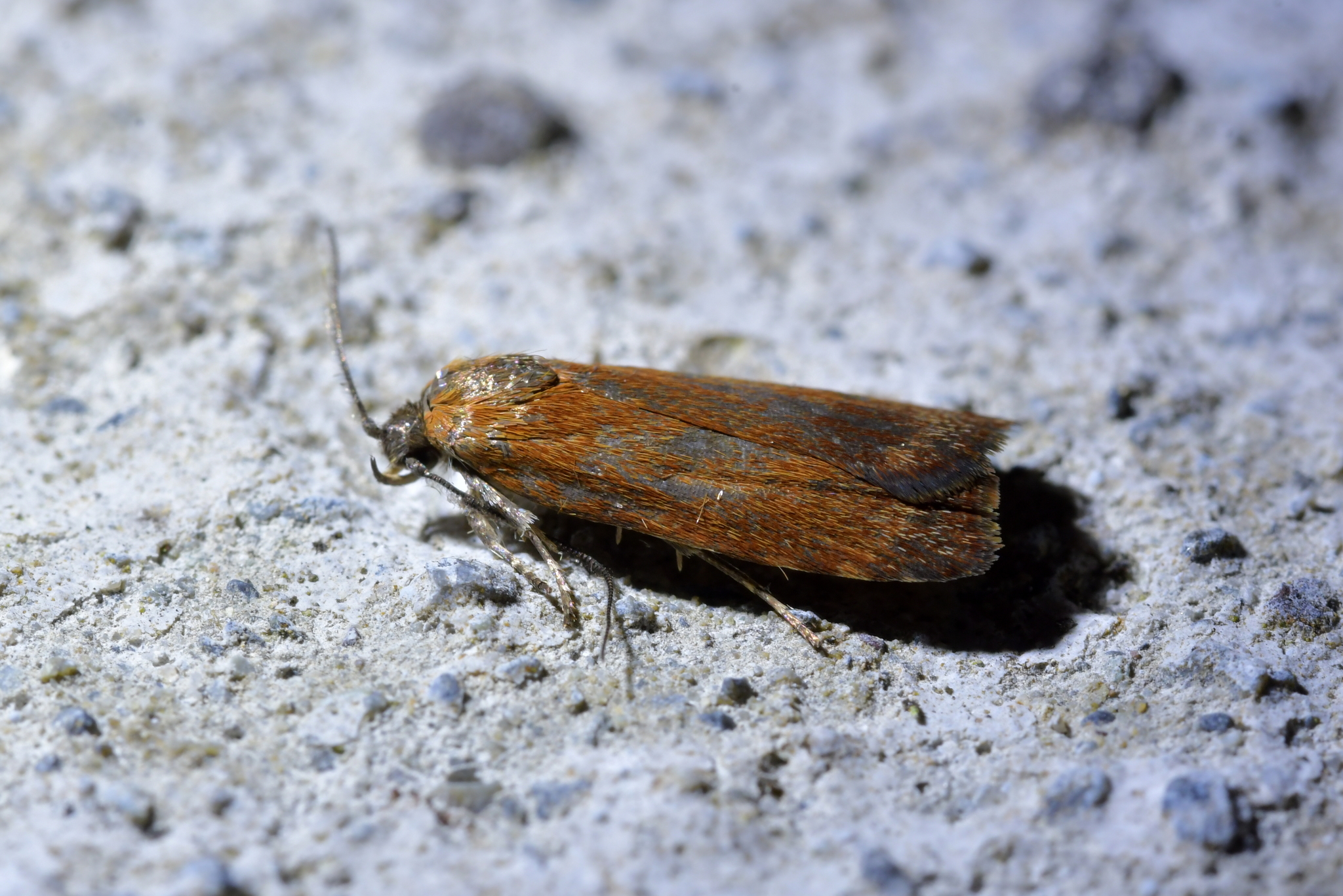

Scientific classification
- Kingdom: Animalia
- Phylum: Arthropoda
- Class: Insecta
- Order: Lepidoptera
- Family: Oecophoridae
- Genus: Hierodoris
- Species: H. illita

Binomial name
- Hierodoris illita (Felder & Rogenhofer, 1875)

Synonyms
- Atychia illita Felder & Rogenhofer, 1875; Heliostibes illita (Felder & Rogenhofer, 1875); Heliostibes chlorobela Meyrick, 1921; Hierodoris chlorobela (Meyrick, 1921)

= Hierodoris illita =

Species of moth

Hierodoris illita is a moth of the family Oecophoridae. It is endemic to New Zealand and is found in both the North and South Islands. However this species has not been recorded at Stewart Island / Rakiura.

The larvae feed on the inside of woody stems of Coriaria arborea. Specimens have also been reared from galls both on a stem of Muehlenbeckia australis and on a stem of Nothofagus truncata. Specimens have also been reared from the cones of the exotic species Larix decidua The larvae normally pupate within the stem of their host plant. The wingspan of adults of this species is between 20 and 30 mm with the forewings being blackish, variably overlain with reddish and whitish scales. The hindwings of the common form are blackish with orange streaks. However H. illlita is variable in appearance with some specimens having a rich reddish brown forewings without markings and a form exists that has whitish hindwing markings in thin stripes from the base of the hindwing. Adults of this species are on the wing from November until February. This species is known to fly during the day and have been observed flying over tall bushes and trees, including Coriaria ruscifolia and Kunzea ericoides, during hot, sunny days.

== Taxonomy ==
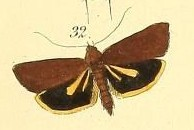
First description illustration of H. illita

This species was described by Cajetan von Felder and Alois Friedrich Rogenhofer in 1875 and named Atychia illita. In 1888 Edward Meyrick placed this species within the genus Heliostibes. George Hudson also discussed this species using that name in his 1928 book The butterflies and moths of New Zealand. In 1988 J. S. Dugdale placed this species within the genus Hierodoris. Robert Hoare confirmed this placement in 2005. In 2005 Hoare also synonymised H. cholorobela with H. illita. Hoare did so as he argued that the difference in the third segment of the labial palp, as noted by Hudson when discussing H. cholorobela, are found in specimens previously placed in both H. cholorobela and H. illita. Also the genitalia in H. cholorobela specimens are identical to those in specimens of H. illita from the South Island.

The male holotype specimen of H. illita, collected by T. R. Oxley in Nelson, is held at the Natural History Museum, London.

== Description ==
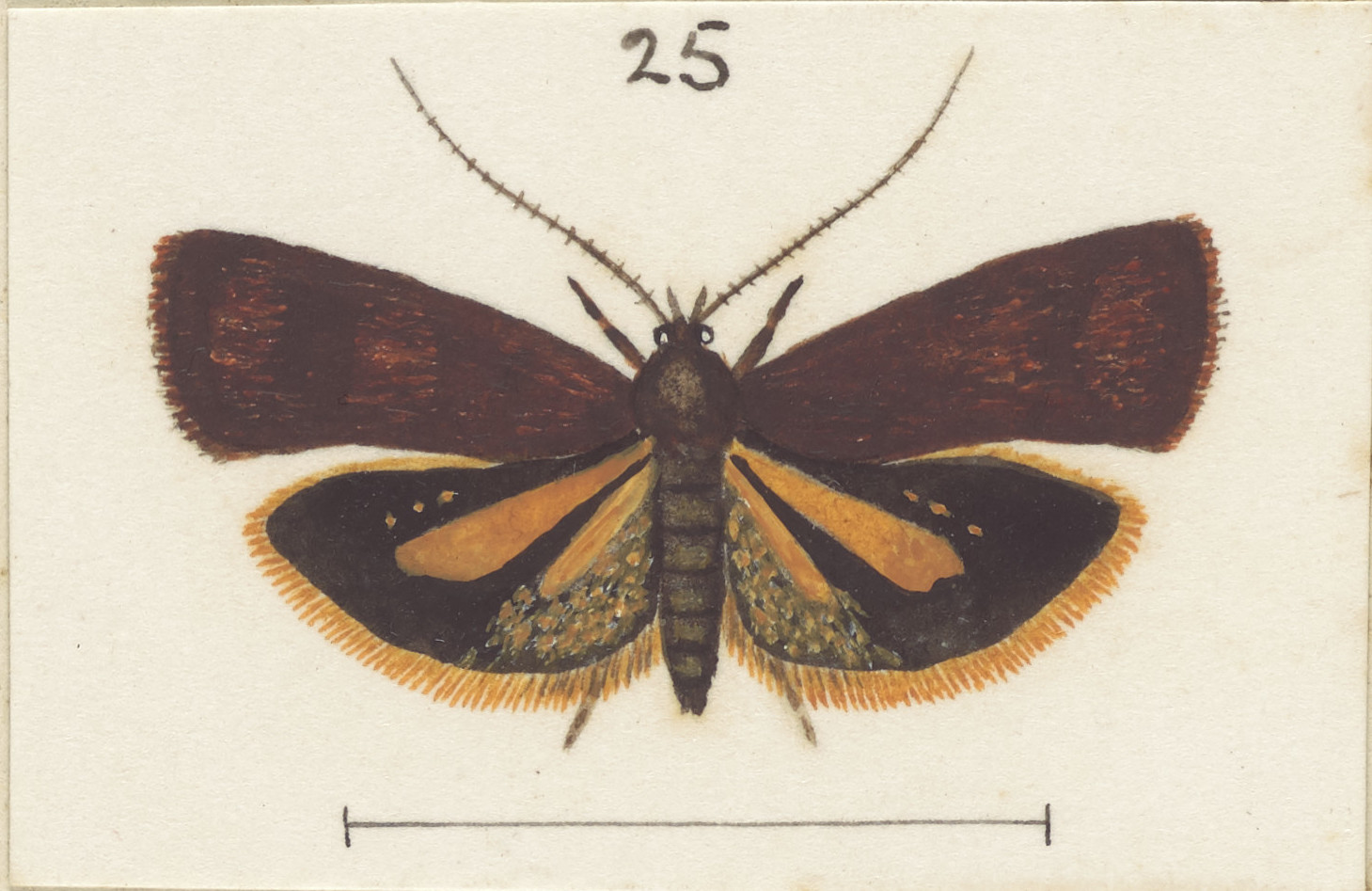
Female illustrated by George Hudson.

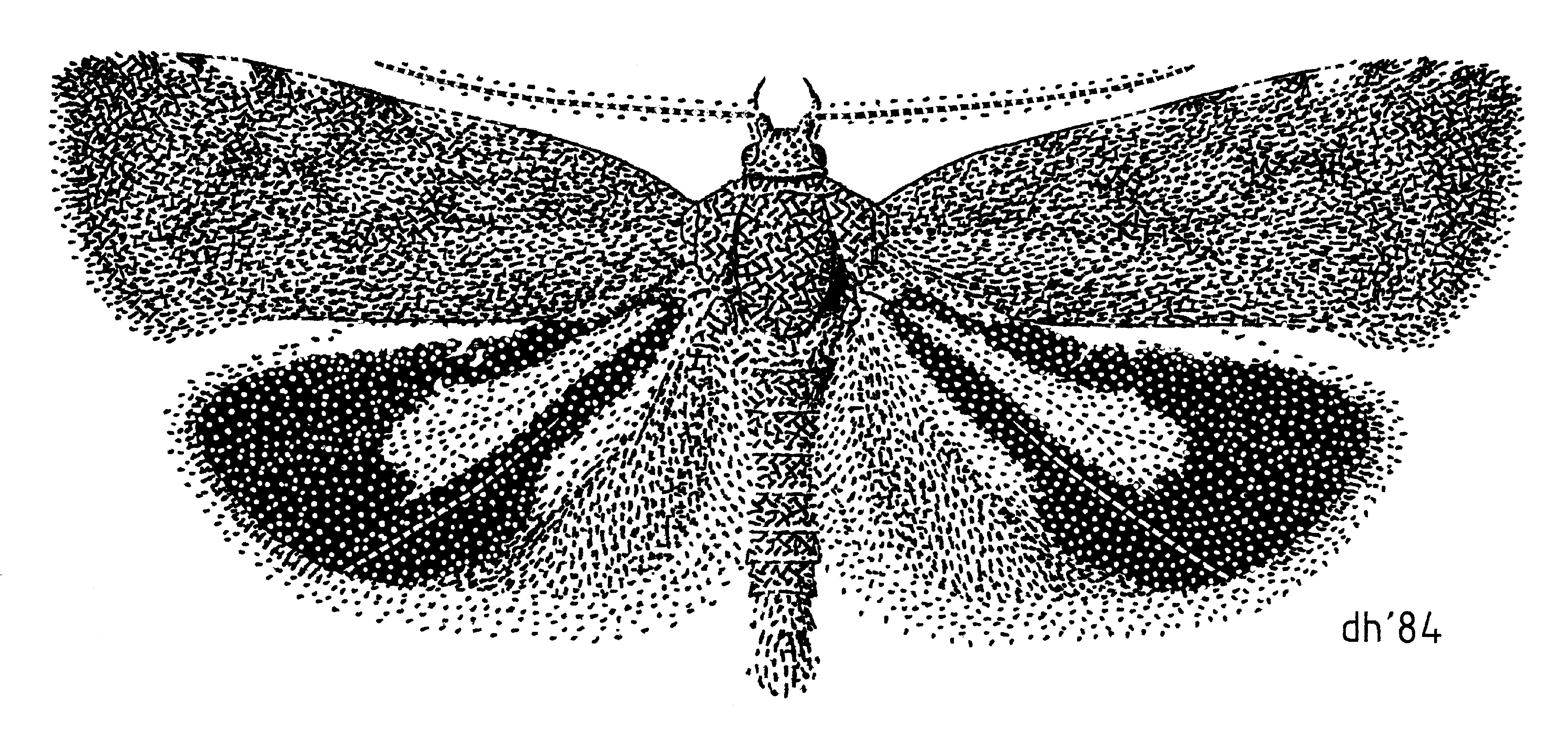
Hierodoris illita illustrated by Des Helmore.

Hoare described the larvae of this species as follows:

Head dark brown, marked darker longitudinally. Thorax and abdomen dorsally and laterally grey, ventrally whitish grey; broad irregular broken dorsal and subdorsal lines whitish yellow; dorsal pinacula black and shiny; A10 darker grey, mottled black.

Hudson described the species as follows:

The expanse of the wings is 7/8 inch. The forewings are very rich dark brown, thinly speckled with elongate bluish-white scales; there are usually cloudy discal marks before and beyond the middle, and a darker curved terminal band. The hindwings are rich velvety-black, with two unequal elongate-triangular bright orange-yellow marks, and a cloud of minute yellow dots near the tornus. The cilia of the hindwings are bright orange-yellow.

The wingspan is 20–30 mm with the forewings being blackish, variably overlain with reddish and whitish scales. The hindwings of the common form are blackish with orange streaks. This species is variable in appearance with some specimens having a rich reddish brown forewings without markings. There is a form with hindwing markings that are whitish in thin stripes from the base of the hindwing.

It is possible to confuse H. illita with H. atychioides where specimens of the former species have very dark hindwings. This species can be distinguished from H. bilineata as it has a larger wingspan. As this species has a labial palp that is unmodified and no metallic coloured scales on its forewings, it can also be distinguished from H. huia. H. illita can be distinguished from H. stella as H. illita has unmodified antennae and is a larger moth.

== Distribution ==
This species is endemic to New Zealand and is found throughout the North and South Islands. This species has not been recorded at Stewart Island / Rakiura.

== Behaviour ==
Adults of this species are on the wing from November until February. This species is known to fly during the day and have been observed flying over tall bushes and trees, including Coriaria ruscifolia and Kunzea ericoides, during hot, sunny days.

== Habitat and hosts ==
The larvae feed on Coriaria arborea. They feed inside a woody stem or branch of their host plant. Specimens have also been reared from galls both on a stem of Muehlenbeckia australis and on a stem of Nothofagus truncata. Specimens have also been reared from cones of the exotic species Larix decidua. The larvae pupate within the stem of the plant.
