= Karen Ross =

American politician

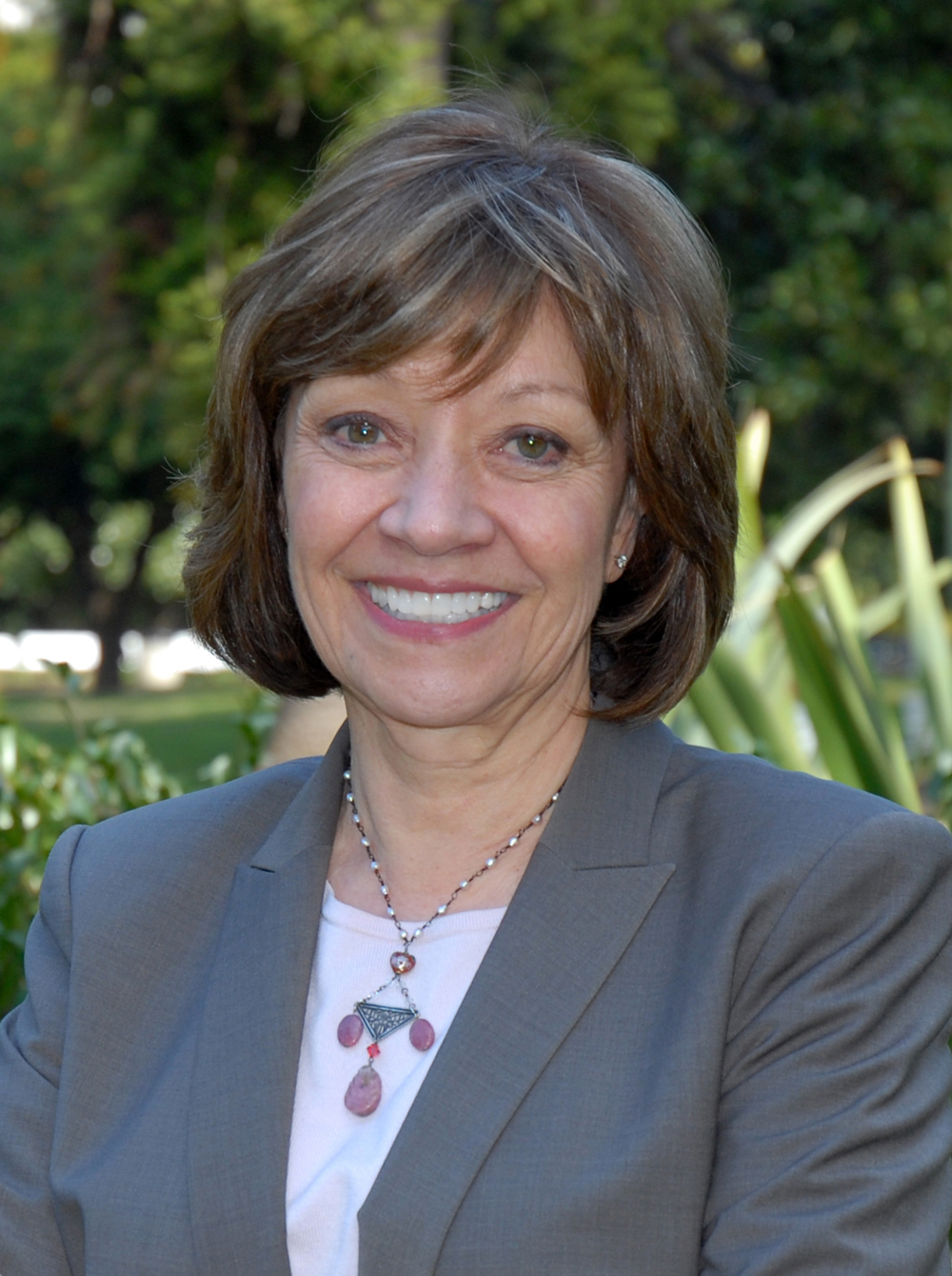

Secretary of the California Department of Food and Agriculture
- Incumbent
- Assumed office January 12, 2011
- Governor: Jerry Brown; Gavin Newsom
- Preceded by: A. G. Kawamura

Personal details
- Born: Nebraska, U.S.
- Party: Democratic
- Education: University of Nebraska–Lincoln (BA)

Karen Ross is the Secretary of the California Department of Food and Agriculture, having been appointed to that post by Governor Jerry Brown on January 12, 2011. She had previously served as Chief of Staff to U.S. Secretary of Agriculture Tom Vilsack, a position she accepted in 2009. From 1996 to 2009, she was president of the California Association of Winegrape Growers (CAWG). She is a graduate of the University of Nebraska–Lincoln, and the Nebraska Agricultural Leadership Program.

Her prior experience includes ten years as an advocate for agricultural and rural electric cooperatives at the state and national level, both in California and her native state of Nebraska, and serving as a staff member for then-United States Senator Edward Zorinsky of Nebraska from 1978 to 1985, and working on several U.S. Senate and presidential campaigns.

A major leader in California's agricultural community, she was born and reared on a family farm in western Nebraska which she and her husband co-own with her brother where her family still raises grain crops and cattle.

In her capacity as the secretary of CDFA, Ross was the defendant of the Supreme Court case National Pork Producers Council v. Ross, in which the US Supreme Court upheld the legality of 2018 California Proposition 12, which set standards for the confinement of pigs and other farm animals which produce the animal products sold in California.
