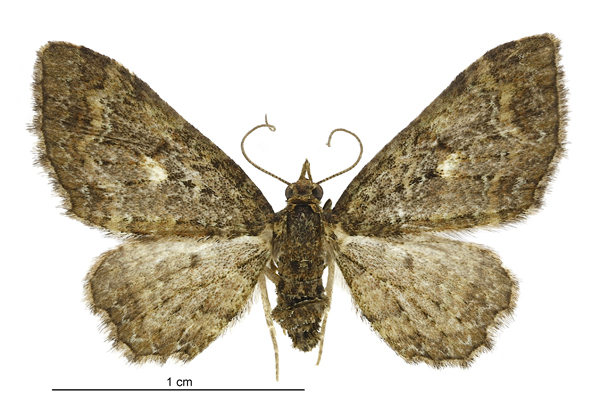
- Female
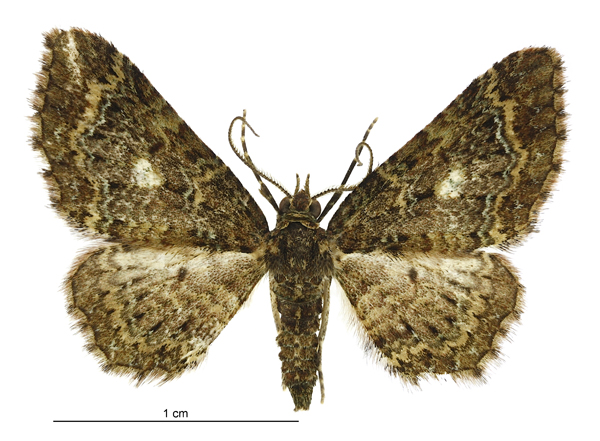
- Male

Scientific classification
- Kingdom: Animalia
- Phylum: Arthropoda
- Class: Insecta
- Order: Lepidoptera
- Family: Geometridae
- Genus: Pasiphila
- Species: P. lunata

Binomial name
- Pasiphila lunata (Philpott, 1912)

Synonyms
- Chloroclystis lunata Philpott, 1912

= Pasiphila lunata =

Species of moth

Pasiphila lunata is a species of moth of the family Geometridae. This species was first described by Alfred Philpott in 1912. It is endemic to New Zealand and has been observed on both the North and South Island. Larvae feed on Veronica species including on Veronica salicifolia.

== Taxonomy ==
This species was first described by Alfred Philpott in 1912 and originally named Chloroclystis lunata. In 1928 George Hudson illustrated and discussed this species under that name in his book The butterflies and moths of New Zealand. In 1971 John S. Dugdale placed this species in the genus Pasiphila. The male holotype, collected by Philpott at Wallacetown in Southland, is held at the New Zealand Arthropod Collection.

== Description ==
Philpott described the male adult of this species as follows:

♂. 18-19 mm. Head, palpi, thorax, and abdomen dark greenish-fuscous. Palpi 1 1/2. Antennae biciliated with long fascicles, ciliations 3. Forewings triangular, costa almost straight, termen slightly bowed, subsinuate on lower half ; dark greenish- fuscous ; veins marked more or less with black ; lines obscure ; some faint thin waved green lines near base ; median band ochreous except beneath costa, anterior edge from 1/2 to 3/5, waved, hardly curved, posterior from 3/4 to 4/5, bluntly projecting at middle and concave on lower half ; a thin dentate bluish-green subterminal line : cilia ochreous, barred with fuscous. Hindwings fuscous, sprinkled with ochreous ; veins with alternate black and white dots ; a thin dentate bluish-green subterminal line. ♀ as ♂, but median band almost obsolete, and with prominent irregular crescentic white mark in middle of forewing, the limbs directed posteriorly.

Hudson described this species as being variable in appearance and dark looking compared to other species in the genus Pasiphila.

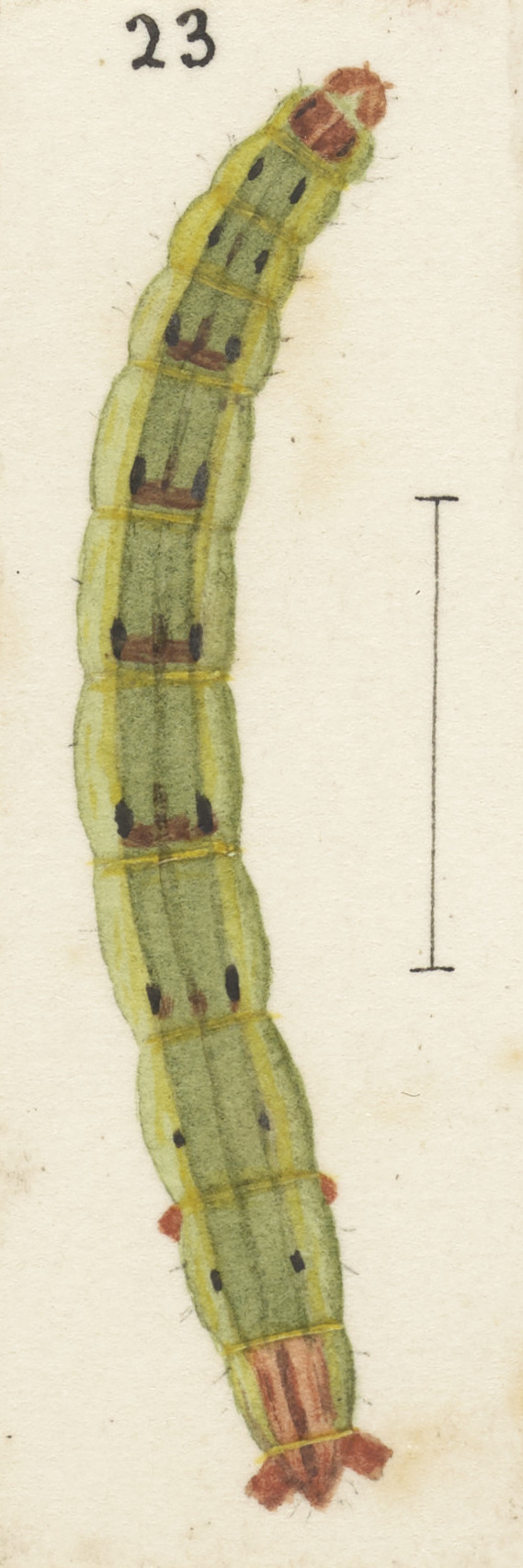
Larva

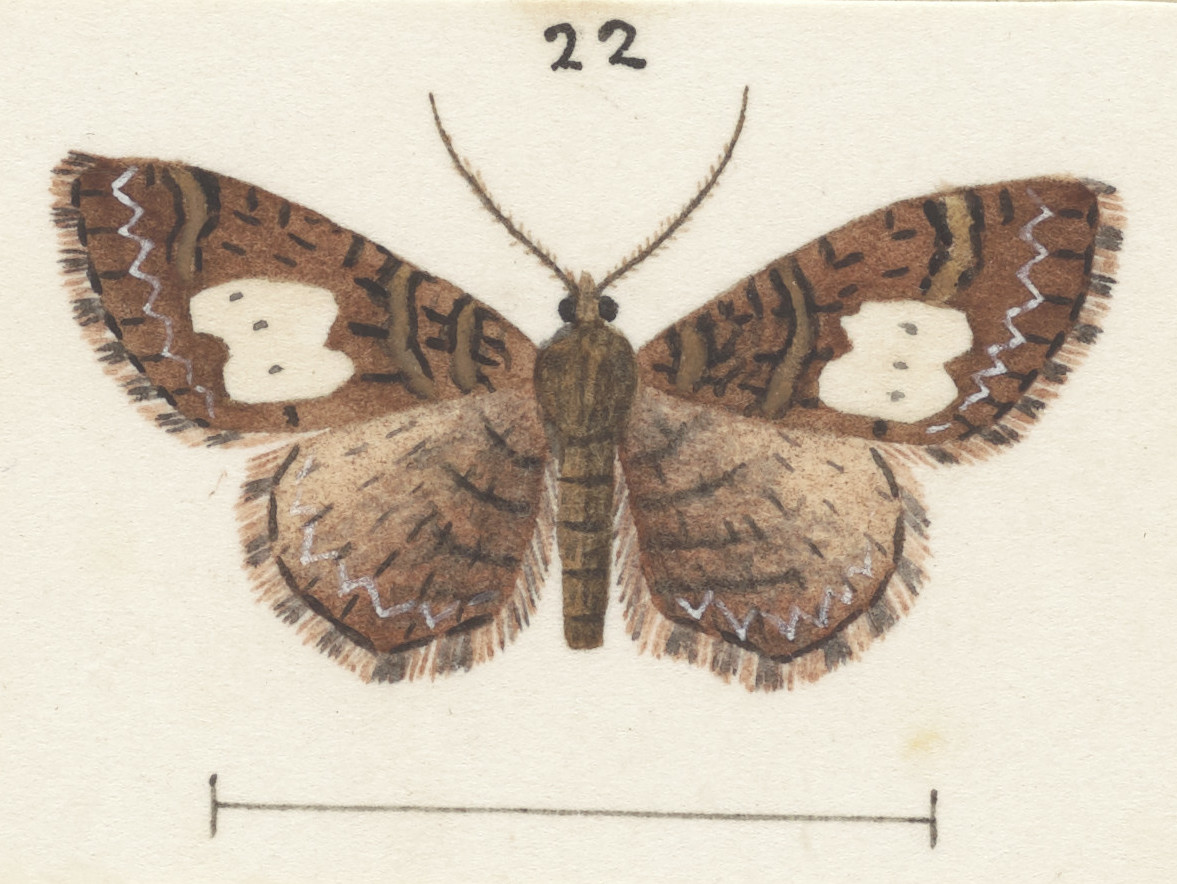
Adult male

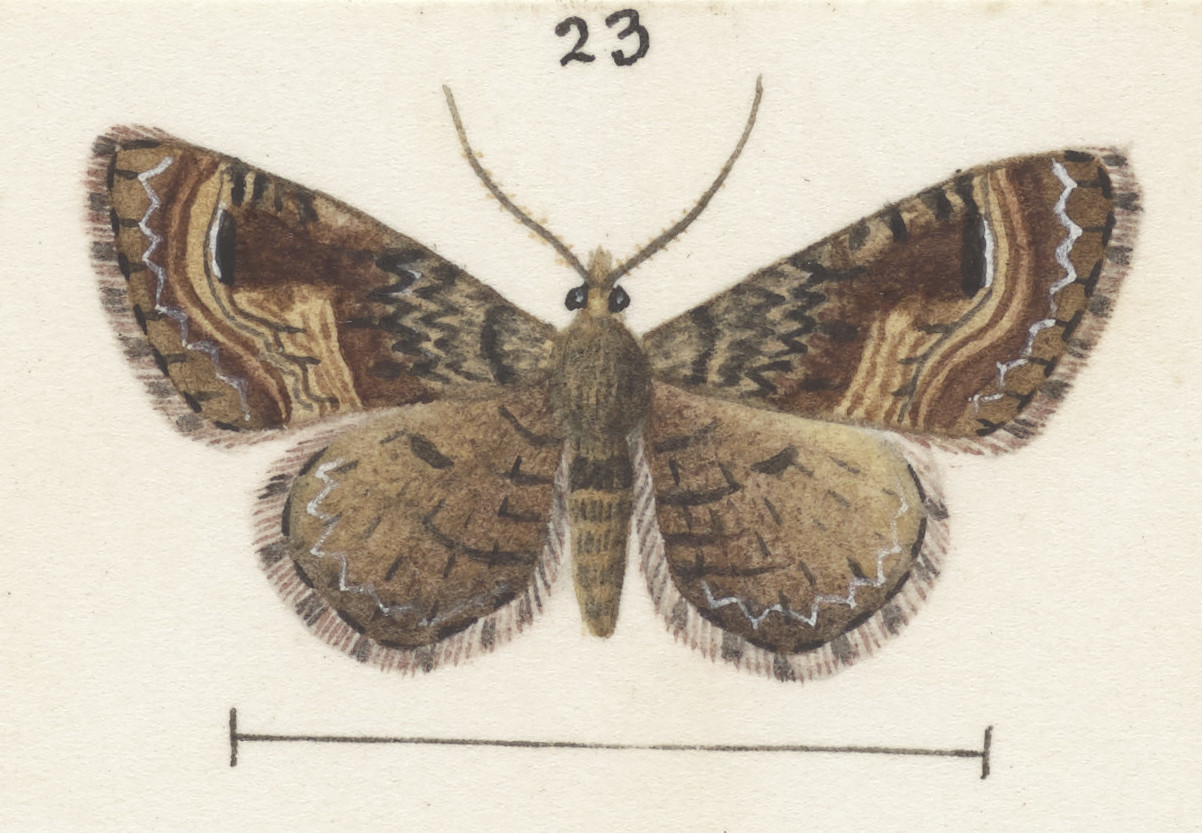
Adult male

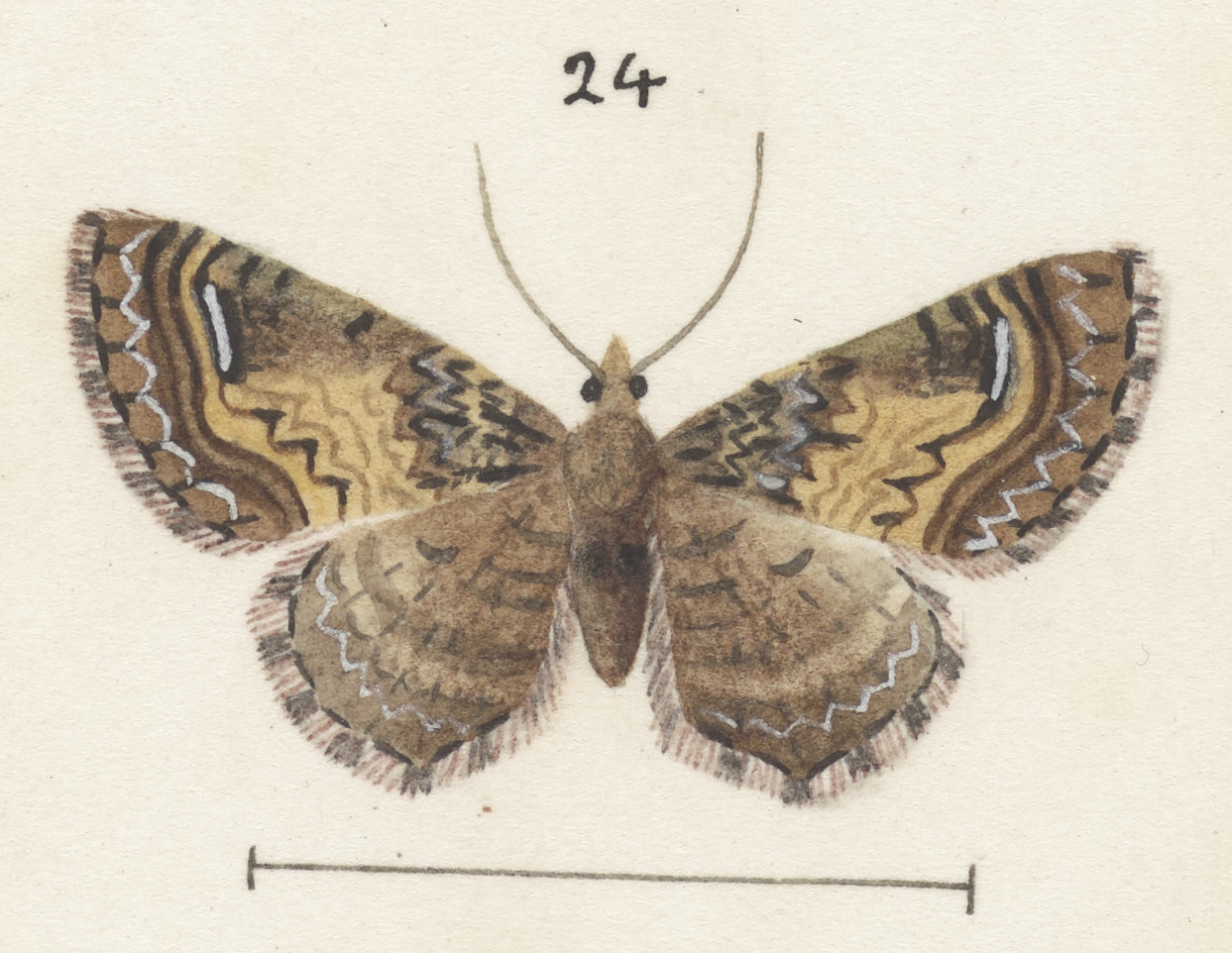
Adult female

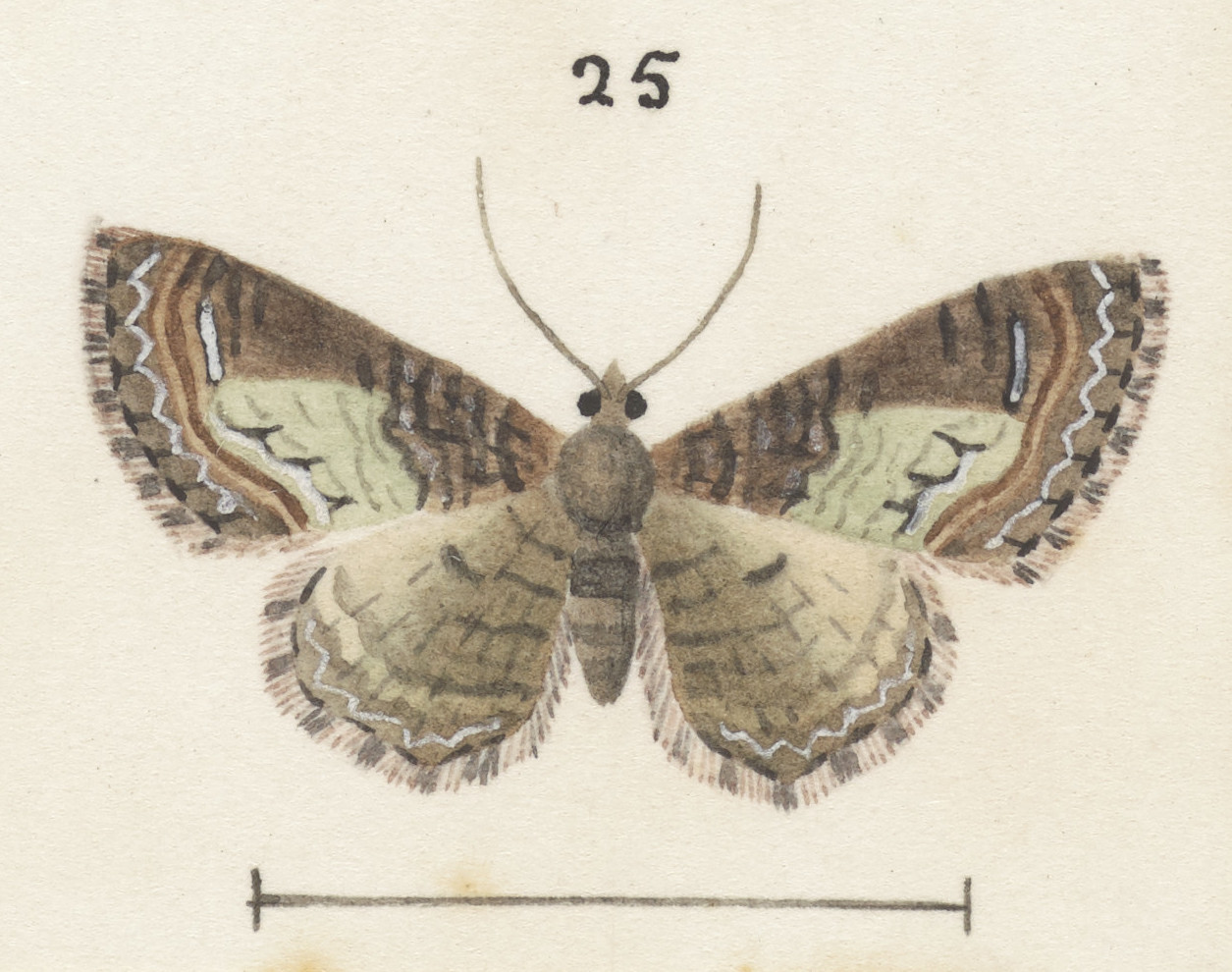
Adult female

== Distribution ==
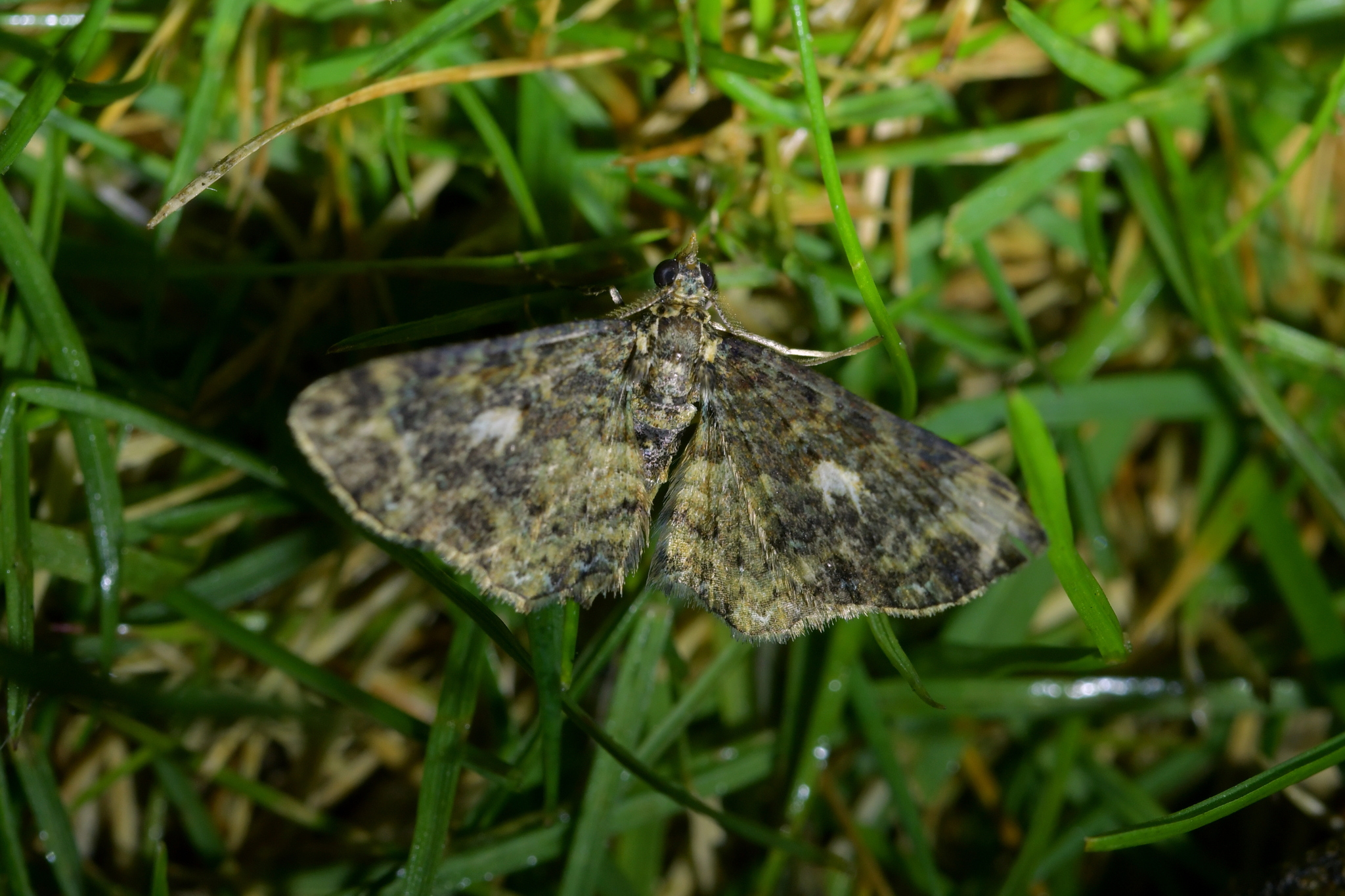
Live specimen.

P. lunata is endemic to New Zealand. It has been observed in both the North and South Islands.

== Habitat and hosts ==
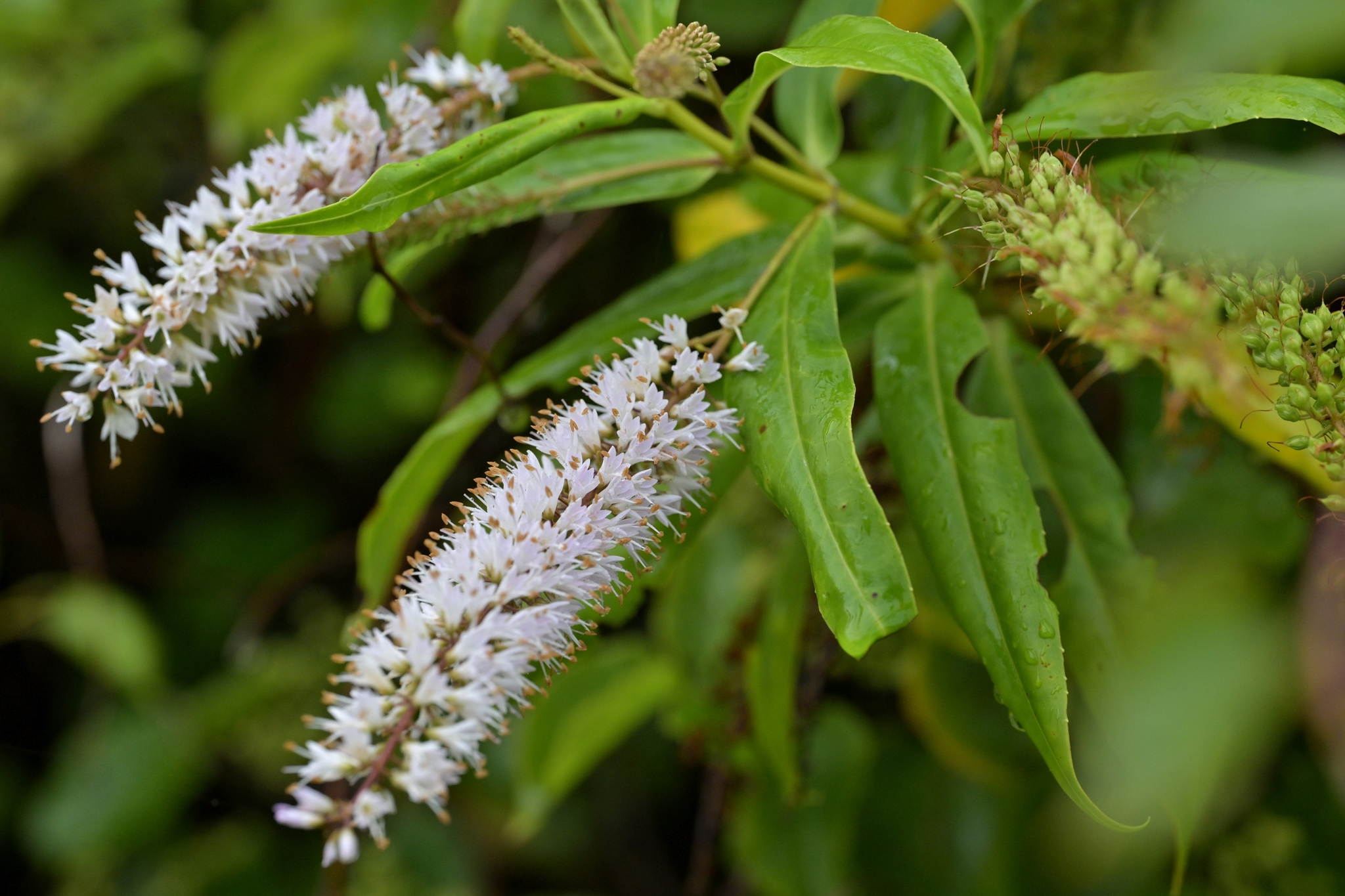
Larval host Veronica salicifolia.

The larvae feed on Veronica species. Philpott stated that he found larvae of this species on Veronica salicifolia.
