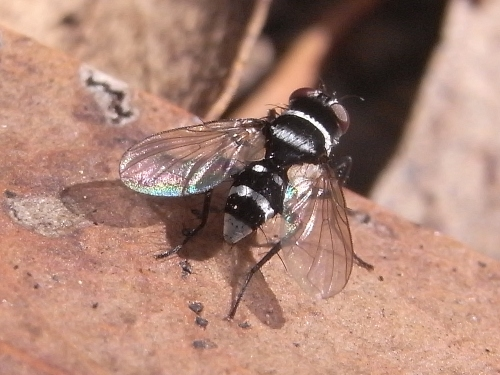

Scientific classification
- Kingdom: Animalia
- Phylum: Arthropoda
- Clade: Pancrustacea
- Class: Insecta
- Order: Diptera
- Family: Tachinidae
- Subfamily: Exoristinae
- Tribe: Blondeliini
- Genus: Trigonospila
- Species: T. cingulata

Binomial name
- Trigonospila cingulata (Macquart, 1851)

Synonyms
- Myobia cingulata; Zosteromyia cingulata

= Trigonospila cingulata =

Species of fly

Trigonospila cingulata is a species of fly in the family Tachinidae.

== Identification ==
Like other members of the genus, it is distinctive for its striking colouration. The species is primarily black with two silvery transverse bars on the thorax and three silvery transverse bars on the abdomen. The silvery transverse bars on the abdomen are narrow, never reaching the discal setae. Antennae are inserted at two-thirds eye depth, and reach a little way beyond half the distance to the oral margin

== Distribution ==
Trigonospila cingulata is a common species in Queensland, New South Wales, and the Australian Capital Territory. Both males and females can be found resting on vegetation in Spring, Summer, and early Autumn.
