= California Department of Food and Agriculture =

U.S. state cabinet-level government agency

- Official logo

Agency overview
- Formed: 1919
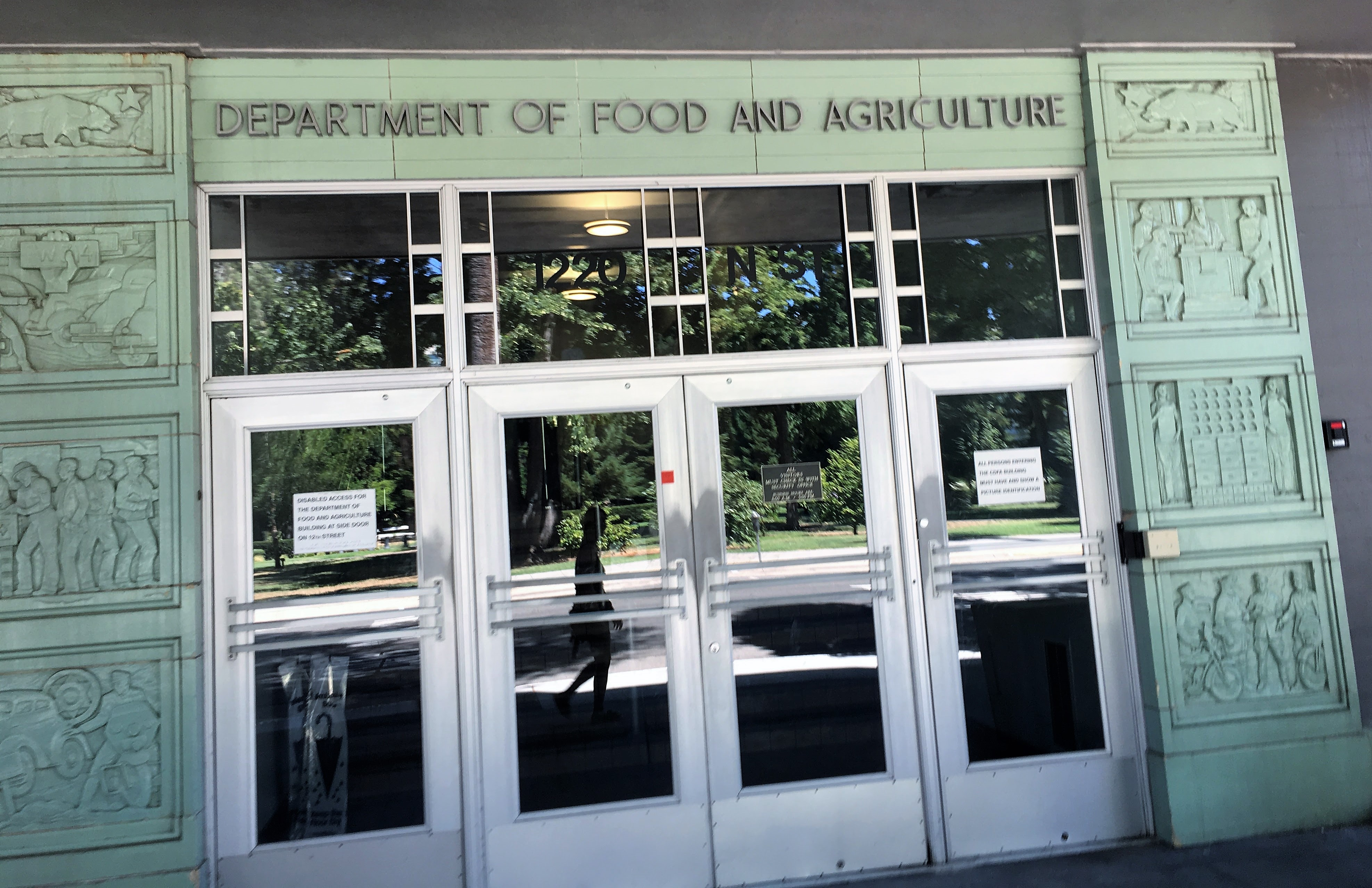
- Headquarters: 1220 N Street, Sacramento, California
- Employees: 2,300
- Annual budget: $310 Million (2007)
- Agency executive: Karen Ross, Secretary
- Website: www.cdfa.ca.gov

The California Department of Food and Agriculture (CDFA) is a cabinet-level agency in the government of California. Established in 1919 by the California State Legislature and signed into law by Governor William Stephens, the Department of Food and Agriculture is responsible for ensuring the state's food safety, the protection of the state's agriculture from invasive species, and promoting the California agricultural industry.

The Department of Food and Agriculture maintains district and field offices in 32 counties across the state, and two extraterritorial offices in Hawaii and Arizona. This includes agricultural inspection stations at the state's borders. The California State Board of Food and Agriculture is an advisory board to the governor and secretary.

As of January 2019, the Secretary of Agriculture was Karen Ross, who is a member of Governor Gavin Newsom's cabinet, having originally been appointed to that post by Governor Jerry Brown in January, 2011. As a cabinet-level agency, the Secretary reports directly to the Governor.

== Divisions ==
The Department of Food and Agriculture is internally divided into seven administration divisions, carrying out state food safety and regulation policy:

The Animal Health and Food Safety Services (AHFSS) provides services to protect California's poultry and livestock, to ensure safety of food from animal origin, to protect public health, and to protect livestock owners against losses due to theft and of animals or straying.

The Division of Fairs & Expositions (F&E) provides fiscal and policy oversight of the network of California's 78 fairs and manages the use of available funding and other services.

The Inspection Services Division (IS) states their mission is to "provide professional services that support and contribute to a safe, abundant, quality food supply; environmentally sound agricultural practices; and an equitable marketplace for California agriculture," and states:

We fulfill this mission by providing the following services: Inspect fruits, vegetables and nuts to ensure maturity, grade, size, weight, packaging and labeling meet the consumers' quality expectations. Conduct chemical analysis in support of food and environmental safety. Perform verification audits to ensure good handling and agricultural practices are utilized to contribute to a safe food supply. Ensure fertilizer, animal feed, and livestock drugs are safe and effective, and meet the quality and quantity guaranteed by the manufacturer. This helps prevent toxins and contaminants from entering the food chain. Monitor the market place to provide California consumers with eggs that are wholesome, properly labeled, refrigerated, and of established quality while maintaining fair and equitable marketing standards in the California egg industry.

IS's California Organic Program is responsible for enforcing the Organic Foods Production Act of 1990 and the California Organic Products Act of 2003; however, the California Department of Public Health enforces laws relating to products marketed as "organic". The California Organic Program is fully funded by industry registration fees.

The Division of Marketing Services conducts research and information gathering, disburses marketing and economic information, assures producers are paid for their products, assists the dairy industry in maintaining stable marketing conditions, and provides mediation to resolve problems amongst producers and handlers.

The Division of Measurement Standards works with county sealers of weights and measures to verify the quantity of packaged and bulk commodities, to ensure the accuracy of commercial measuring and weighing devices, and to enforce the quality, labeling, and advertising standards for most petroleum products.

The Plant Health and Pest Prevention Services Division (Plant Health Division) conducts pest prevention and management programs that effectively protects California's horticulture, agriculture, natural resources, and urban environments from invasive or dangerous plant pests.

== Board of Food and Agriculture ==
The California State Board of Food and Agriculture is an advisory board to the governor and secretary. It is a fifteen-member state board, appointed by the Governor to represent a broad range of agricultural commodities, a variety of geographic regions and both the University of California and California State University academic systems.

== Agriculture inspection stations ==
The Department of Food and Agriculture operates 16 agriculture inspection stations that are located along the major highways that enter the state from Oregon, Nevada, and Arizona.

== Goals ==
The Department of Food and Agriculture's stated mission is "to help the Governor and Legislature ensure delivery of safe food and fiber through responsible environmental stewardship in a fair marketplace for all Californians." CDFA explains their goals are to "Ensure that only safe and quality food reaches the consumer. Protect against invasion of exotic pests and diseases. Promote California agriculture and food products both at home and abroad. Ensure an equitable and orderly marketplace for California's agricultural products. Build coalitions supporting the state's agricultural infrastructure to meet evolving industry needs."

== Public relations and legislation ==
In late 2007 and early 2008, the CDFA became the center of a controversial eradication program for the light brown apple moth involving aerial spraying of the pesticide Checkmate. After an initial spraying in Monterey and Santa Cruz counties, hundreds of reports of adverse health effects and plans to expand the spraying into the Bay Area resulted in negative media attention, several state legislative responses to close the loophole that allowed the spraying without an environmental impact report, rejection of the plan by numerous city and county councils, and an investigative report by the Associated Press that led to the suspension of a nearly $500,000 public relations campaign undertaken by the CDFA to "counter the concerns raised by local environmentalists and residents, who complained of breathing problems and other ill health effects after the spraying." In March 2008, the mayor of Albany, California, Robert Lieber, called for the resignation of CDFA Secretary Kawamura.

CDFA is responsible for writing regulations to implement 2018 California Proposition 12, which implements minimum space requirements farm animals which produce animal products for the California market. This became the subject of litigation. On May 11, 2023, the Supreme Court of the United States decided the case, National Pork Producers Council v. Ross, and upheld Proposition 12.

== See also ==
- United States Department of Agriculture
- California Agriculture (journal)
- California Environmental Protection Agency
