= Platyptilia pulverulenta =

- Male holotype

Scientific classification
- Kingdom: Animalia
- Phylum: Arthropoda
- Clade: Pancrustacea
- Class: Insecta
- Order: Lepidoptera
- Family: Pterophoridae
- Genus: Platyptilia
- Species: P. pulverulenta

Binomial name
- Platyptilia pulverulenta Philpott, 1923

Species of plume moth endemic to New Zealand

Platyptilia pulverulenta is a moth of the family Pterophoridae. It was first described by Alfred Philpott. It is endemic to New Zealand and has been observed in the Nelson region. Adults are on the wing in November.

== Taxonomy ==
This species was first described by Alfred Philpott in 1923 using a specimen collected by Philpott in Nelson. George Hudson described this species as a synonym of Platyptilia falcatalis (now known as Amblyptilia falcatalis) in his 1928 book The butterflies and moths of New Zealand. In 1988 John S. Dugdale removed this species from this synonymy as the palpal length and colour pattern clearly distinguished this species from A. falcatalis. The male holotype is held at the New Zealand Arthropod Collection.

== Description ==
Philpott described this species:

♂ 23 mm. Head whitish, with a projecting conical tuft of hair. Antennae reddish-brown mixed with whitish. Palpi reddish. Thorax reddish-brown densely mixed with white. Abdomen greyish-brown. Legs reddish-brown broadly banded with ochreous-whitish. Forewings narrow, apex acute, termen of first segment concave, of second evenly rounded; reddish-brown, densely sprinkled with white on basal ⅔ and more sparingly on second segment and lower half of first; a blackish-brown triangular blotch on costa at ¾, its apex below cleft: cilia brown mingled with white. Hindwings pale reddish-brown: cilia paler; third segment with fairly even basal series of dark spatulate scales extending to near tornus.

It is similar in appearance to Amblyptilia aeolodes but can be distinguished as P. pulverulenta lacks the subterminal white line at the end of the forewing. P. pulverulenta also has an evenly rounded termen on the second segment of the forewing which can assist with distinguishing the species.

== Distribution ==
This species is endemic to New Zealand. It has been observed in the Nelson region.

== Behaviour ==
Adults are on the wing in November.
