= Amblyptilia skoui =

Scientific classification
- Kingdom: Animalia
- Phylum: Arthropoda
- Class: Insecta
- Order: Lepidoptera
- Family: Pterophoridae
- Genus: Amblyptilia
- Species: A. skoui

Binomial name
- Amblyptilia skoui Gielis, 1999

Species of plume moth

Amblyptilia skoui is a moth of the family Pterophoridae.
