= Amblyptilia zhdankoi =

Scientific classification
- Domain: Eukaryota
- Kingdom: Animalia
- Phylum: Arthropoda
- Class: Insecta
- Order: Lepidoptera
- Family: Pterophoridae
- Genus: Amblyptilia
- Species: A. zhdankoi

Binomial name
- Amblyptilia zhdankoi Ustjuzhanin, 2001

Species of plume moth

Amblyptilia zhdankoi is a moth of the family Pterophoridae. It is found in Kazakhstan.
