= Amblyptilia bowmani =

Scientific classification
- Domain: Eukaryota
- Kingdom: Animalia
- Phylum: Arthropoda
- Class: Insecta
- Order: Lepidoptera
- Family: Pterophoridae
- Genus: Amblyptilia
- Species: A. bowmani

Binomial name
- Amblyptilia bowmani (McDunnough, 1923)

Synonyms
- Stenoptilia bowmani McDunnough, 1927

Species of plume moth

Amblyptilia bowmani is a moth of the family Pterophoridae that can be found in North America.
