= Amblyptilia clavata =

Scientific classification
- Kingdom: Animalia
- Phylum: Arthropoda
- Clade: Pancrustacea
- Class: Insecta
- Order: Lepidoptera
- Family: Pterophoridae
- Genus: Amblyptilia
- Species: A. clavata

Binomial name
- Amblyptilia clavata S.L. Hao, H.H. Li & C.S. Wu, 2005

Species of plume moth

Amblyptilia clavata is a moth of the family Pterophoridae. It is found in Sichuan Province, China.
