= Amblyptilia grisea =

Scientific classification
- Kingdom: Animalia
- Phylum: Arthropoda
- Clade: Pancrustacea
- Class: Insecta
- Order: Lepidoptera
- Family: Pterophoridae
- Genus: Amblyptilia
- Species: A. grisea

Binomial name
- Amblyptilia grisea Gibeaux, 1997

Species of plume moth

Amblyptilia grisea is a moth of the family Pterophoridae that is found in Central Asia (Russia and Kazakhstan).
