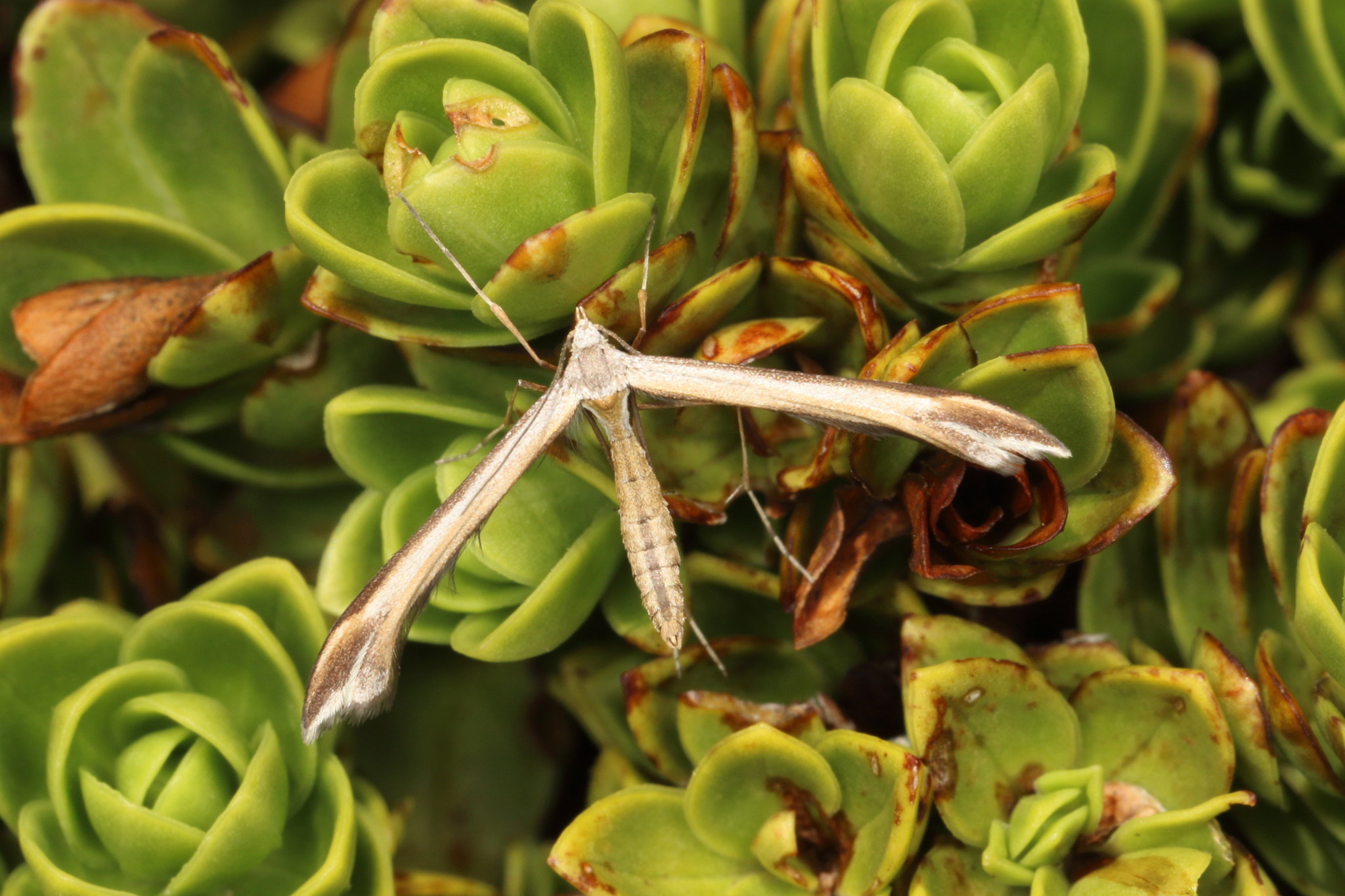

Scientific classification
- Kingdom: Animalia
- Phylum: Arthropoda
- Class: Insecta
- Order: Lepidoptera
- Family: Pterophoridae
- Genus: Amblyptilia
- Species: A. epotis

Binomial name
- Amblyptilia epotis (Meyrick, 1905)

Synonyms
- Platyptilia epotis Meyrick, 1905; Stenoptilia epotis (Meyrick, 1905)

= Amblyptilia epotis =

Species of plume moth, endemic to New Zealand

Amblyptilia epotis is a moth of the family Pterophoridae. It is endemic to New Zealand and is found in the South and Stewart Islands. It inhabits mountainous terrain covered in alpine vegetation or alternatively alpine wetland habitat. The adults of this species are on the wing from February to March. In appearance the adults of this species are variable in colour however this species can be distinguished from similar species by the oblique apical streak on its forewings as well as the patch of white on the costa cilia towards the apex of the forewing.

== Taxonomy ==
This species was first described by Edward Meyrick in 1905 and named Platyptilia epotis using a female specimen collected at the Humboldt Range by George Hudson. In 1910 Meyrick again discussed this species as Hudson sent further specimens to him including the male of the species. In 1928 Hudson, in his publication, The butterflies and moths of New Zealand, placed this species in the genus Stenoptilia. However Alfred Philpott, also in 1928, considered this species under its originally published name Platyptilia epotis. Philpott discussed the male genitalia of this species with the aim of separating species contained in the genera Platyptilia and Stenoptilia. In 1971 Dugdale also discussed the species under the name Platyptilia epotis but in 1988 dealt with this species under the name Stenoptilia epotis. In 1993 Cees Gielis placed this species within the genus Amblyptilia. This placement was followed in 2010 in the New Zealand Inventory of Biodiversity. The holotype specimen is held at the Natural History Museum, London.

== Description ==
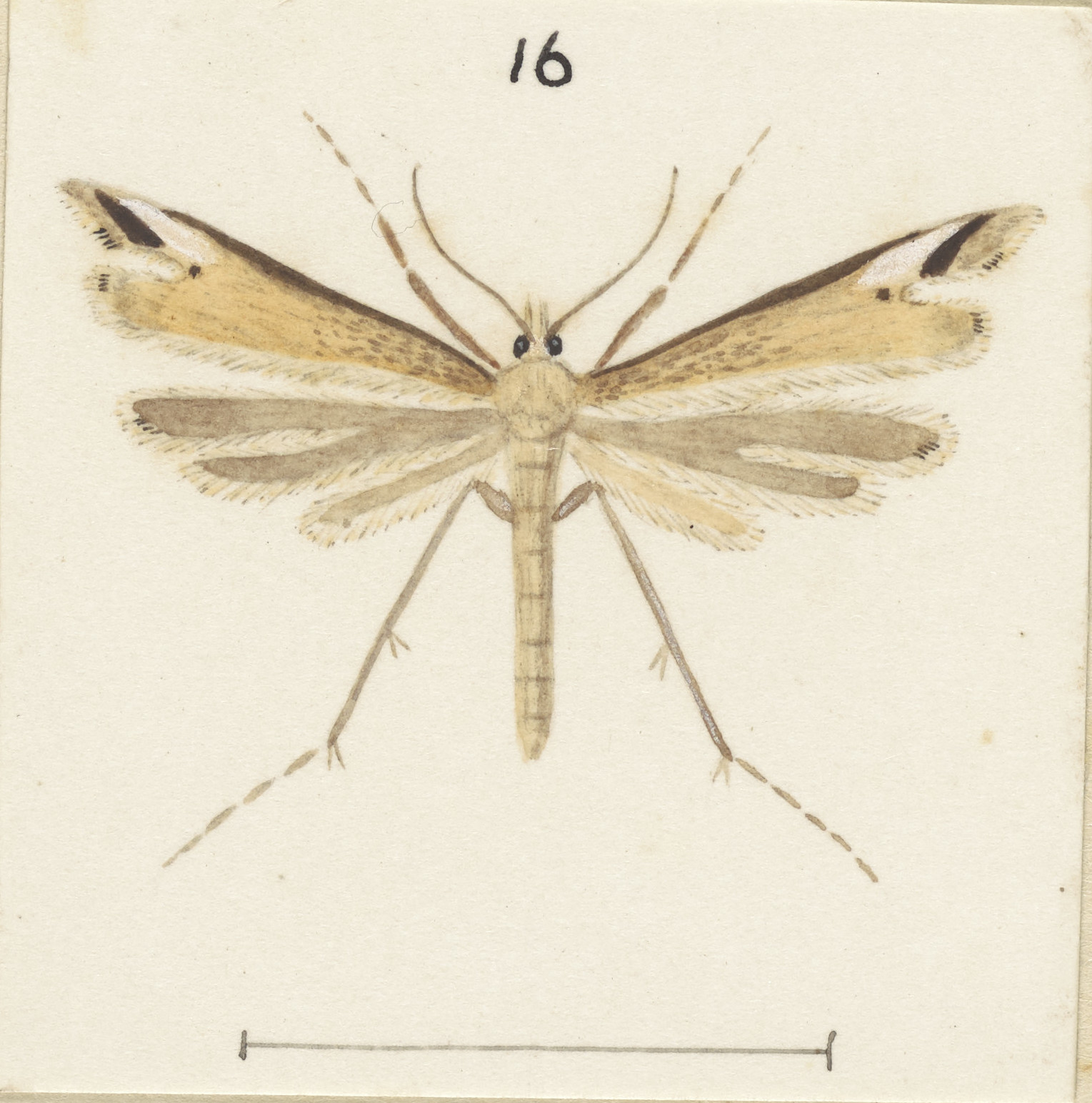
A. epotis illustrated by George Hudson

Meyrick originally described this species as follows:

♀. 25 mm. Head white. Palpi 2 1/2, greyish-ochreous sprinkled with dark fuscous, white above. Antennas grey. Thorax whitish suffusedly sprinkled with brownish-ochreous, patagia becoming clear white posteriorly. Abdomen white, partially suffused with pale brownish-ochreous except towards base. Legs white, anterior femora and tibiae fuscous. Fore-wings with apex pointed, subfalcate, termen rather deeply concave; pale brownish-ochreous densely irrorated with white, broadly suffused with white towards costa and dorsum on posterior half; basal 1/4 of costa irrorated with dark fuscous, thence a narrow dark fuscous costal streak reaching to 3/4; a dot of two or three dark fuscous scales in disc at 2/5; a short transverse blackish-fuscous mark before cleft; a strong oblique blackish streak from apex to anterior half of lower margin of first segment, where it is broadest; an undefined blackish-fuscous longitudinal dash in centre of basal half of second segment : cilia whitish, with a dark fuscous spot above apex, an interrupted blackish basal line on central third of termen, and two or three blackish scales on dorsum at 2/3. Hindwings pale fuscous, second segment whitish-tinged; cilia whitish-fuscous; two or three fine blackish hair scales in dorsal cilia of third segment beyond middle.

This species is variable in colour with specimens from the Mount Arthur tableland being more ochreous and less white than the type specimen. Hudson states that the species can be distinguished from similar species by the oblique apical streak on its forewings as well as a patch of white on the costa cilia towards the apex of the forewing.

== Distribution ==
This species is endemic to New Zealand. It is found in the South Island and on Stewart Island / Rakiura.

== Behaviour ==
Adults of A. epotis are on the wing from February to March.

== Habitat ==
This species inhabits mountainous terrain with alpine vegetation or alpine wetland habitat.
