= Amblyptilia japonica =

Scientific classification
- Domain: Eukaryota
- Kingdom: Animalia
- Phylum: Arthropoda
- Class: Insecta
- Order: Lepidoptera
- Family: Pterophoridae
- Genus: Amblyptilia
- Species: A. japonica

Binomial name
- Amblyptilia japonica (Yano, 1963)

Synonyms
- Platyptilia japonica Yano, 1963

Species of plume moth

Amblyptilia japonica is a moth of the family Pterophoridae. It is known from Japan (Honshu) and Korea.

The length of the forewings is 10–11.5 mm.
