= Amblyptilia forcipata =

Scientific classification
- Kingdom: Animalia
- Phylum: Arthropoda
- Clade: Pancrustacea
- Class: Insecta
- Order: Lepidoptera
- Family: Pterophoridae
- Genus: Amblyptilia
- Species: A. forcipata

Binomial name
- Amblyptilia forcipata (Zeller, 1867)

Synonyms
- Amblyptilia forcipatus; Amblyptilia forcipeta; Pterophorus forcipeta; Pterophorus forcipata Zeller, 1867

Species of plume moth

Amblyptilia forcipata is a moth of the family Pterophoridae that is known from India (Sikkim and Darjeeling).

The wingspan is 18–19 millimetres (0.71–0.75 in).
