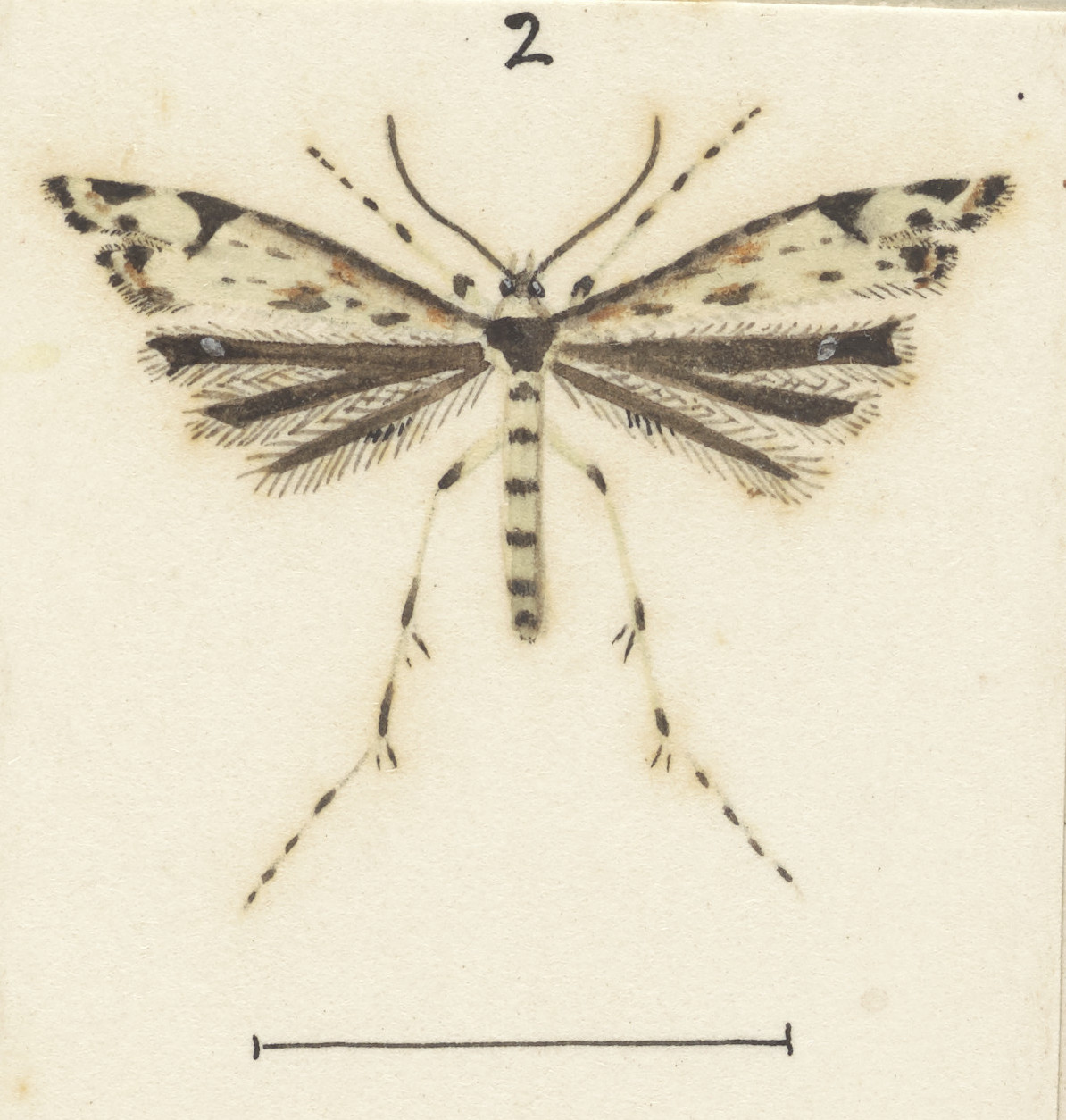
- Male

Conservation status
- Data Deficit (NZ TCS)

Scientific classification
- Kingdom: Animalia
- Phylum: Arthropoda
- Clade: Pancrustacea
- Class: Insecta
- Order: Lepidoptera
- Family: Pterophoridae
- Genus: Amblyptilia
- Species: A. deprivatalis

Binomial name
- Amblyptilia deprivatalis (Walker, 1864)

Synonyms
- Pterophorus deprivatalis Walker, 1864; Platyptilia deprivatalis (Walker, 1864)

= Amblyptilia deprivatalis =

Species of plume moth, endemic to New Zealand

Amblyptilia deprivatalis is a moth of the family Pterophoridae. This species was first described by Frances Walker in 1864. It is endemic to New Zealand and is found in the North and South Islands. Adults are on the wing from October to May and have an affinity to species in the genus Senecio. In 2025 this species was classified as "data deficient" under the New Zealand Threat Classification System.

== Taxonomy ==
This species was first described by Frances Walker in 1864 using specimens collected in Auckland by D. Bolton and named Pterophorus deprivatalis. In 1913 Edward Meyrick discussed this species under the name Platyptilia deprivatalis. In 1928 George Hudson discussing and illustrating this species in his 1928 publication The butterflies and moths of New Zealand using this name. In 1988 John S. Dugdale discussed this species also under the name Platyptilia deprivatalis. In 1993 Cees Gielis placed this species within the genus Amblyptilia. This placement was followed in 2010 in the New Zealand Inventory of Biodiversity. The male lectotype is held at the Natural History Museum, London.

== Description ==
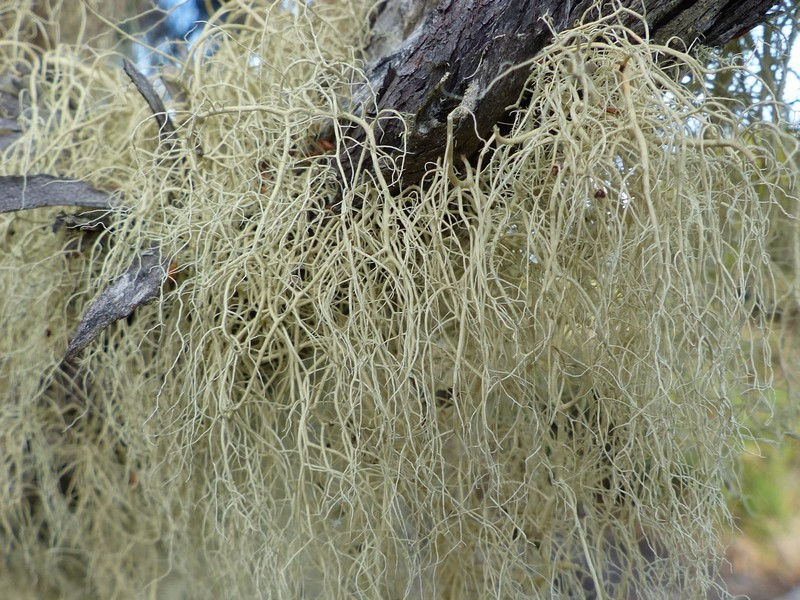
Usnea barbata

Walker described this species as follows:

Male and female. Very pale ochraceous. Legs whitish; femora pale ochraceous towards the tips; tibiae with three ochraceous bands; tarsi with two ochraceous bands. Forewings acute, with an elongated fawn-coloured costal dot at three-fourths of the length. Hind wings fawn-colour. Length of the body 5 lines; of the wings 12 lines.

Hudson described this species as follows:

The expansion of the wings is about 3/4 inch. The fore-wings are very pale yellowish-white with black markings; there is a more or less distinct series of black marks on the costa, from the base to 2/3, often obscured by a brown shading; a large triangular black spot at 3/4 with a pointed apex reaching beyond the middle of the wing; an oblong spot on the costal edge of the first plume and a brownish mark at the apex; a curved blackish-brown mark in the middle of the second plume and a sharp black terminal line; a few irregular black marks and brown dots on the dorsum before the cleft. The hind-wings are dark brownish-grey with purple reflections; there is a small tuft of dense scales in the cilia on the middle of the dorsum of the third digit. The legs and body are pale yellowish-white with the joints marked in black.

Hudson was of the opinion that the appearance of this species evolved for protective purposes when the adults of the species rest against the lichen Usnea barbata. Hudson argued that when at rest on this plant with its hindwings hidden beneath its extended forewings, the adults of A. deprivatalis are almost completely concealed. Hudson stated the markings on the forewings, body and legs fit the general appearance of U. barbata.

== Distribution ==
This species is endemic to New Zealand. Along with the type locality, this species has been observed in the Coromandel, Ohakune, the Mount Arthur tableland, Mount Cook, Ben Lomond, Lake Wakatipu, and Invercargill at altitudes from around 1250 m down to sea level. Hudson regarded it as a rare and local species.

== Behaviour ==
Adults of this species are on the wing from October until May.

== Hosts ==
The adults of this species appear to be attracted to species in the genus Senecio.

== Conservation status ==
In 2025 this species was classified by the New Zealand Department of Conservation as "data deficient" under the New Zealand Threat Classification System.
