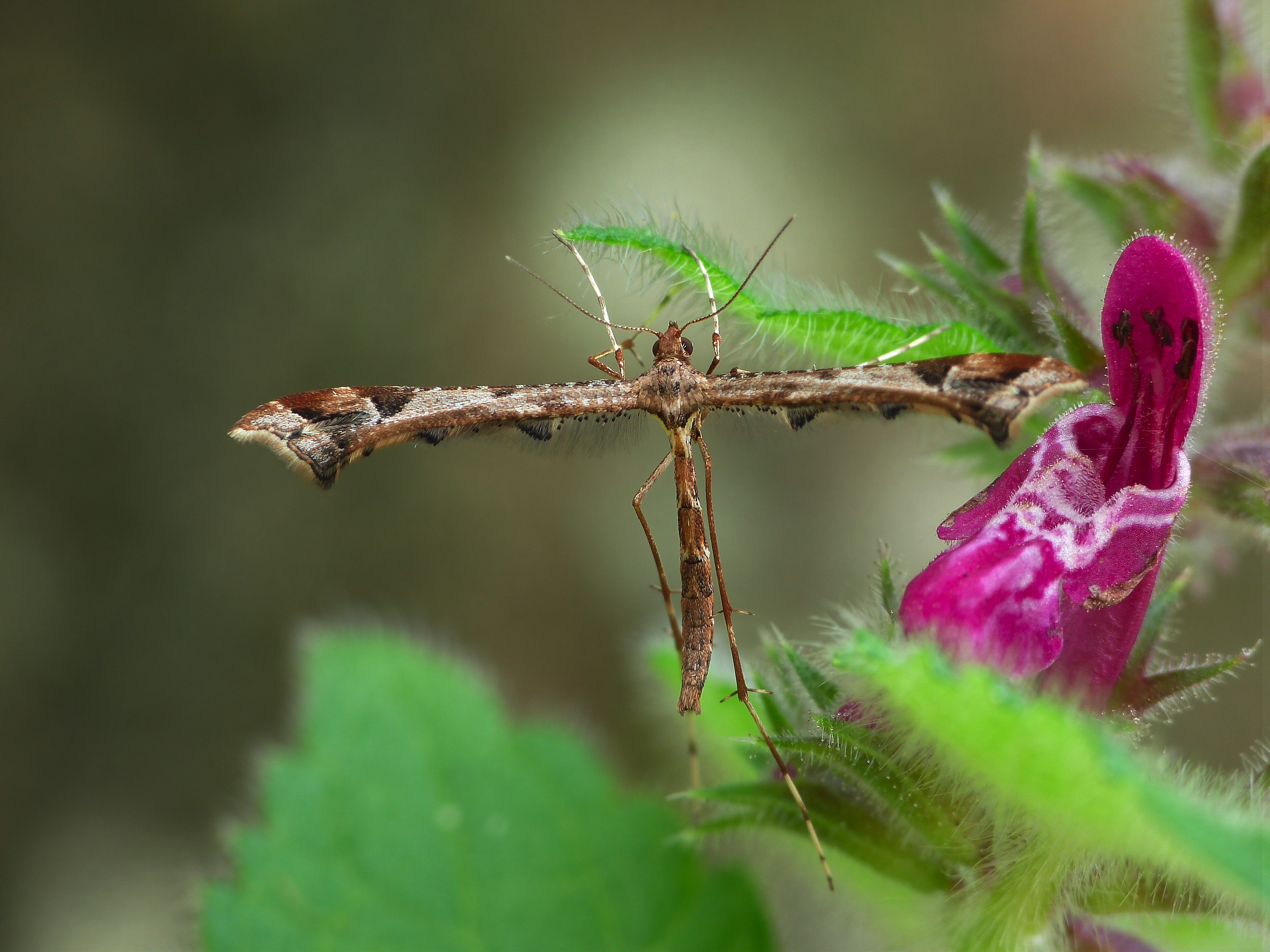

Scientific classification
- Kingdom: Animalia
- Phylum: Arthropoda
- Class: Insecta
- Order: Lepidoptera
- Family: Pterophoridae
- Genus: Amblyptilia
- Species: A. acanthadactyla

Binomial name
- Amblyptilia acanthadactyla (Hübner, 1813)

Synonyms
- List: Alucita acanthadactyla Hübner, 1813; Platyptilia acanthadactyla; Amblyptilia calaminthae Frey, 1886; Amblyptilia tetralicella Hering, 1891; Platyptilia acanthodactyla var. phoenicodactyla Chrétien, 1915

= Amblyptilia acanthadactyla =

Beautiful plume

Species of plume moth

Amblyptilia acanthadactyla, also known as the beautiful plume, is a moth of the family Pterophoroidea found in across the Palearctic including Europe. The species was first described by the German entomologist, Jacob Hübner in 1813.

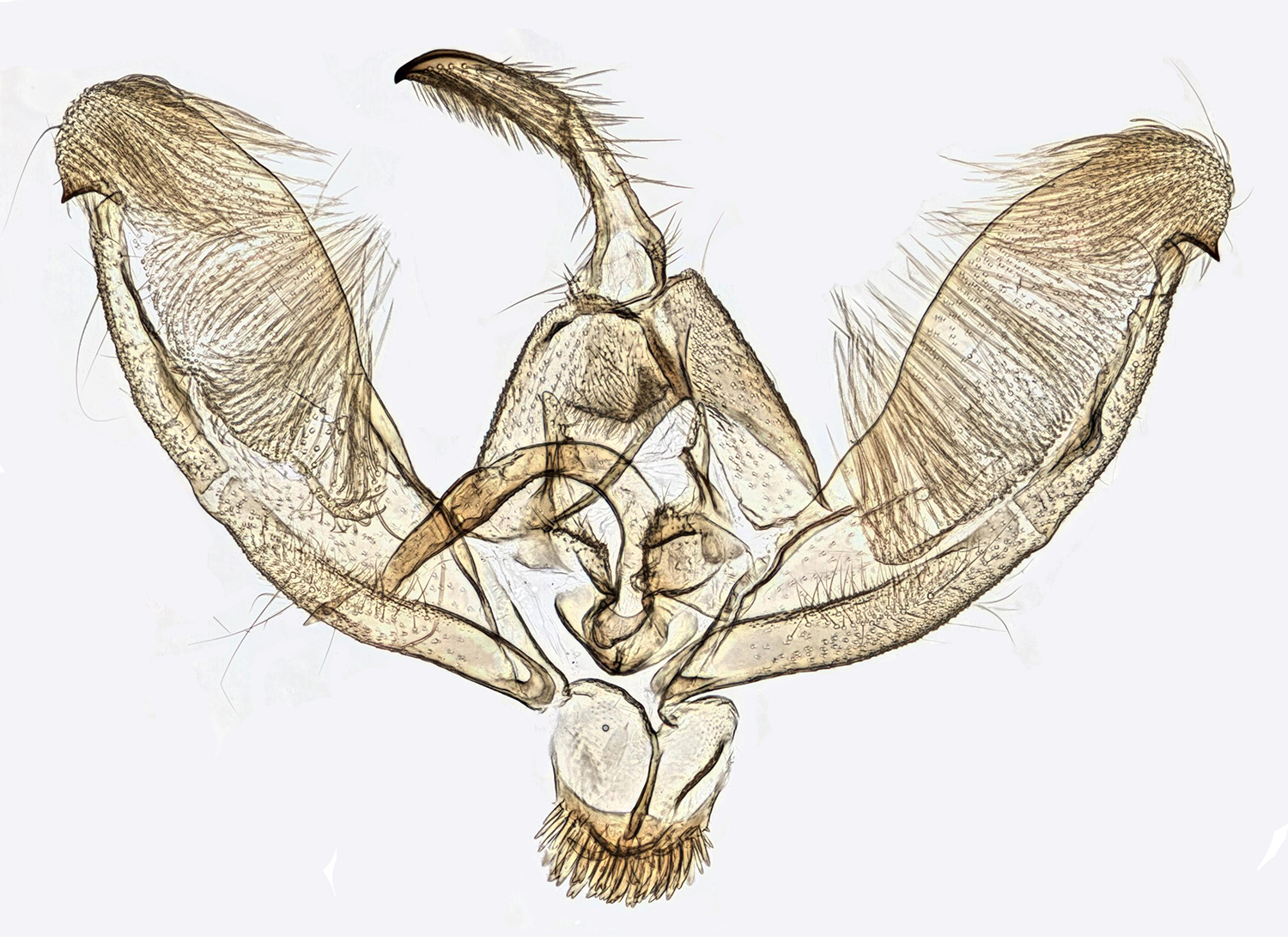
Amblyptilia acanthadactyla male genitalia

== Description ==
The wingspan is 17–23 millimetres (0.67–0.91 in). The imago of the beautiful plume is similar in appearance to the brindled plume (Amblyptilia punctidactyla) but is a warm reddish-brown (cf. darker appearing greyish-brown of the brindled plume, which also has distinct white speckling). Examination of the genitalia is required for certain identification.

The moth flies almost year-round with two generations, flying in July and from September to June (hibernating as an imago). They fly from dusk and the autumn moths have been found on ivy (Hedera helix).

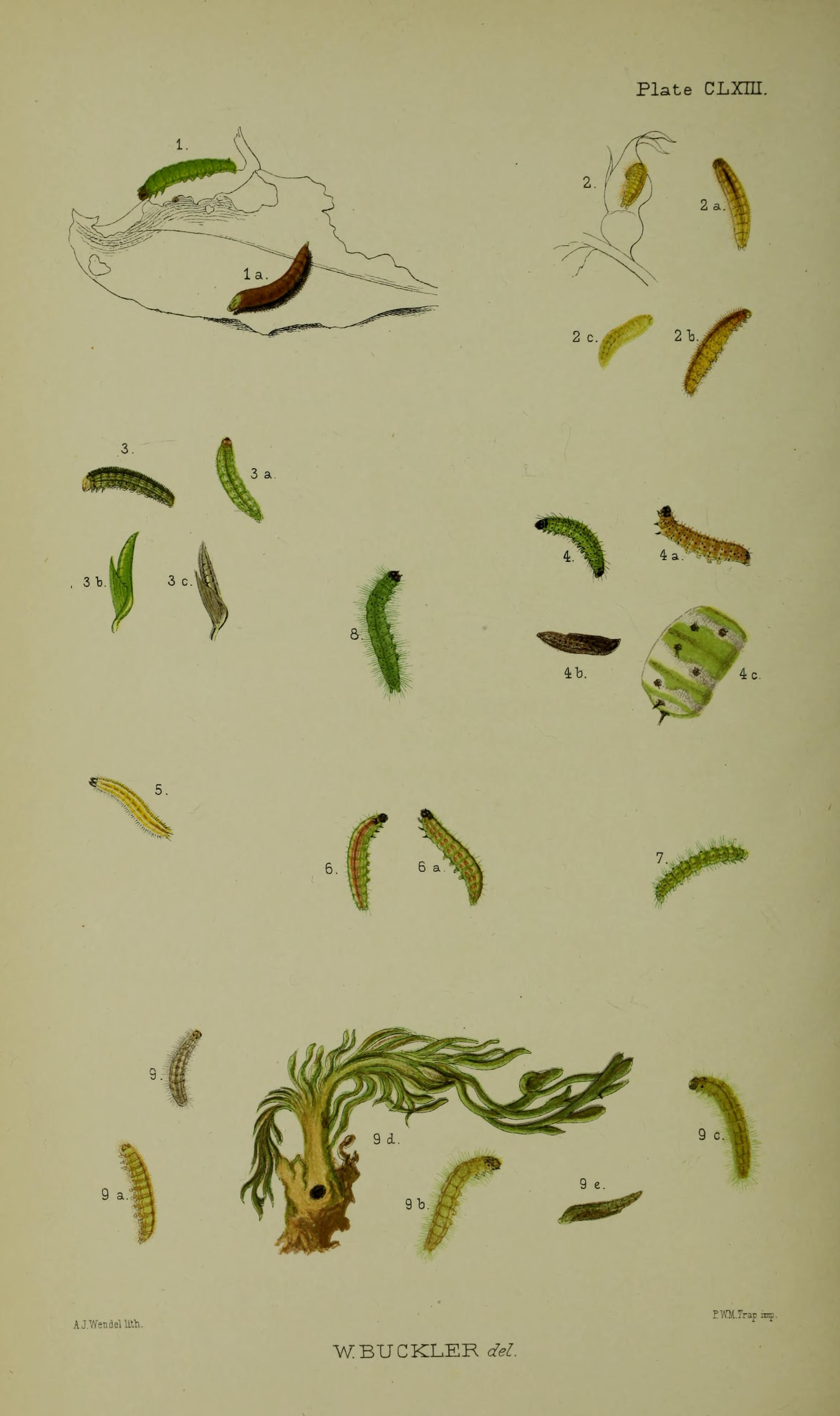
Figs 5 larva after final moult

The larvae feed on various low growing plants, including, restharrow (Ononis spp.), hedge woundwort (Stachys sylvatica), cranesbills (Geranium species), cultivated geraniums (Pelargonium species), goosefoots (Chenopodium species), heathers (Calluna and Erica species), mints (Mentha species), sage (Salvia), wood sage (Teucrium scorodonia), lavender (Lavandula species), eyebright (Euphrasia species), carline thistles (Carlina species), Vaccinium species, calamints (Calamintha species) and catnip (Nepeta species).

== Distribution ==
The beautiful plume is found in Europe and is also known from Iran and Georgia.
