= Amblyptilia atrodactyla =

Scientific classification
- Domain: Eukaryota
- Kingdom: Animalia
- Phylum: Arthropoda
- Class: Insecta
- Order: Lepidoptera
- Family: Pterophoridae
- Genus: Amblyptilia
- Species: A. atrodactyla

Binomial name
- Amblyptilia atrodactyla Pagenstecher, 1900

Species of plume moth

Amblyptilia atrodactyla is a moth of the family Pterophoridae. It is found on the Bismarck Archipelago off the northeastern coast of New Guinea.
