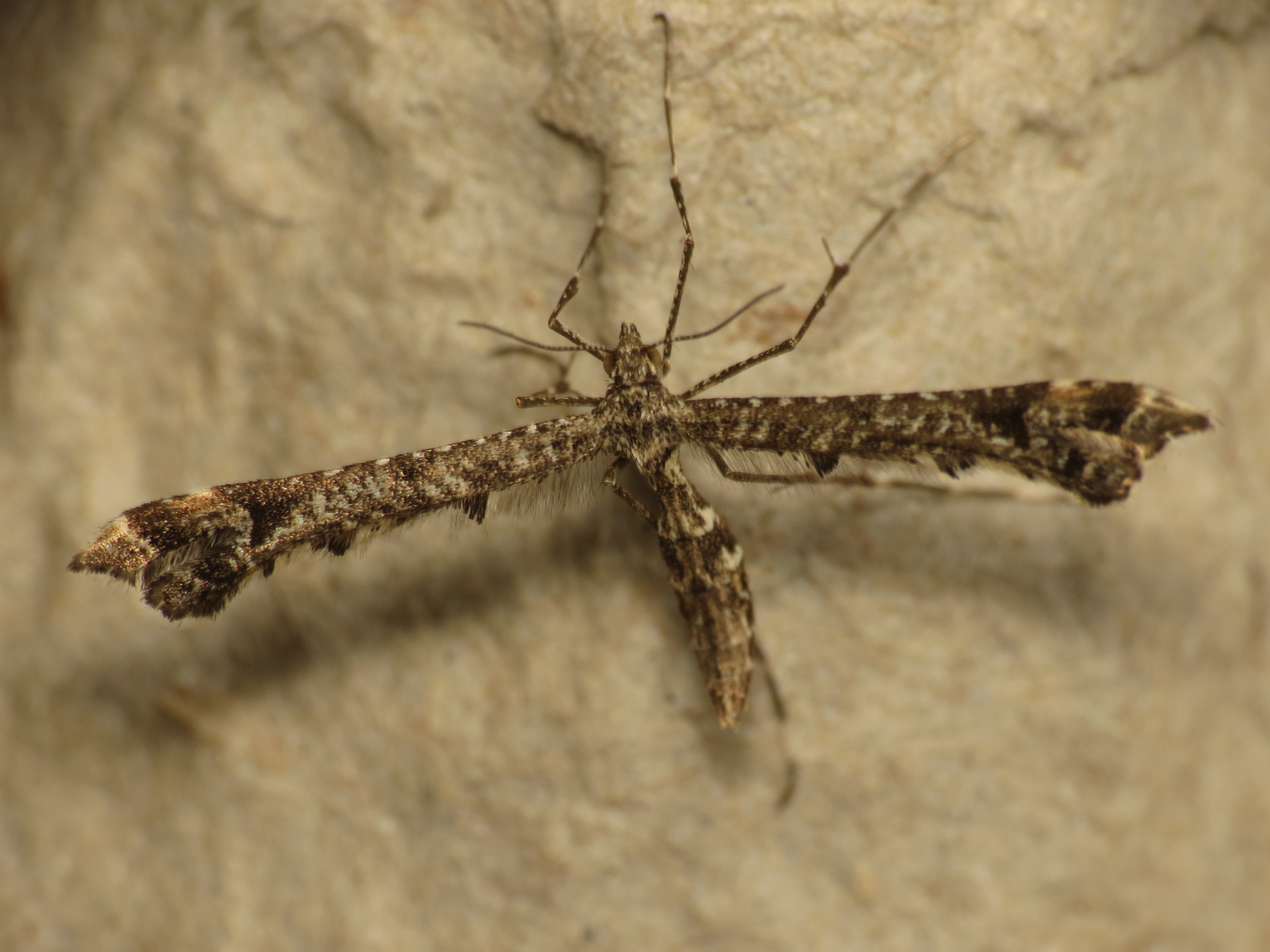

Scientific classification
- Kingdom: Animalia
- Phylum: Arthropoda
- Clade: Pancrustacea
- Class: Insecta
- Order: Lepidoptera
- Family: Pterophoridae
- Genus: Amblyptilia
- Species: A. punctidactyla

Binomial name
- Amblyptilia punctidactyla (Haworth, 1811)

Synonyms
- List: Alucita punctidactyla Haworth, 1811; Alucita cosmodactyla Hübner, 1819; Alucita ulodactyla Zetterstedt, 1840; Platyptilus cosmadactylus var. stachydalis Frey, 1872; Platyptilus moerens Snellen, 1884; Platyptilia jezoensis Matsumura, 1931; Platyptilia bella Yano, 1963

= Amblyptilia punctidactyla =

Species of plume moth

Amblyptilia punctidactyla, also known as the brindled plume, is a moth of the family Pterophoridae found across the Palearctic (including Japan and Europe). The species was first described by the English entomologist, Adrian Hardy Haworth in 1811.

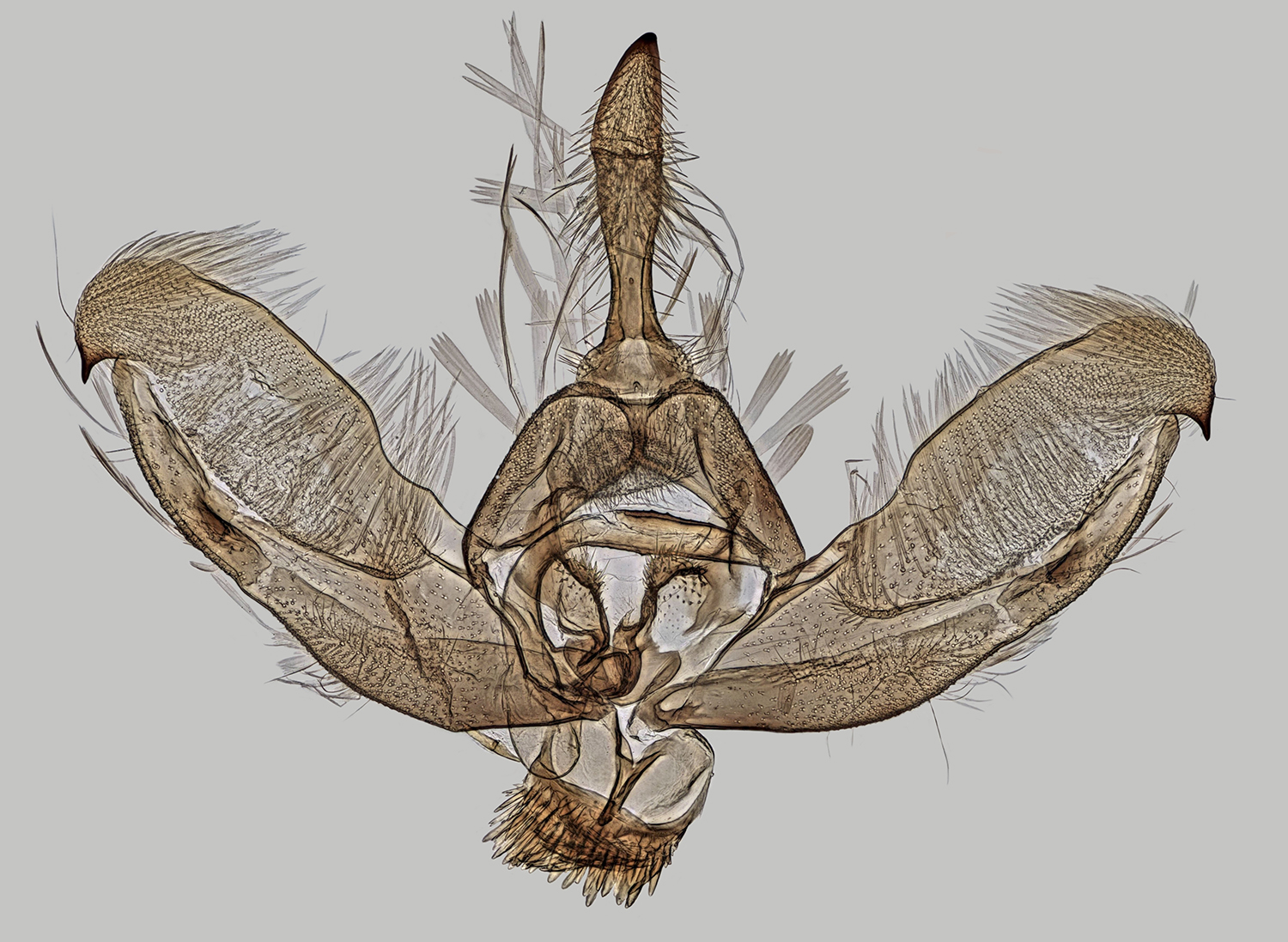
Amblyptilia punctidactyla male genitalia

== Description ==
The wingspan is 18–23 millimetres (0.71–0.91 in). There are two generations per year in western Europe, with Adults on wing in July, and again from September to early-June, hibernating through the winter. The imago of the brindled plume is similar in appearance to the beautiful plume (Amblyptilia acanthadactyla) but is darker appearing greyish-brown (cf. warm reddish-brown colour of the beautiful plume) and has distinct white speckling. Examination of the genitalia is required for certain identification.

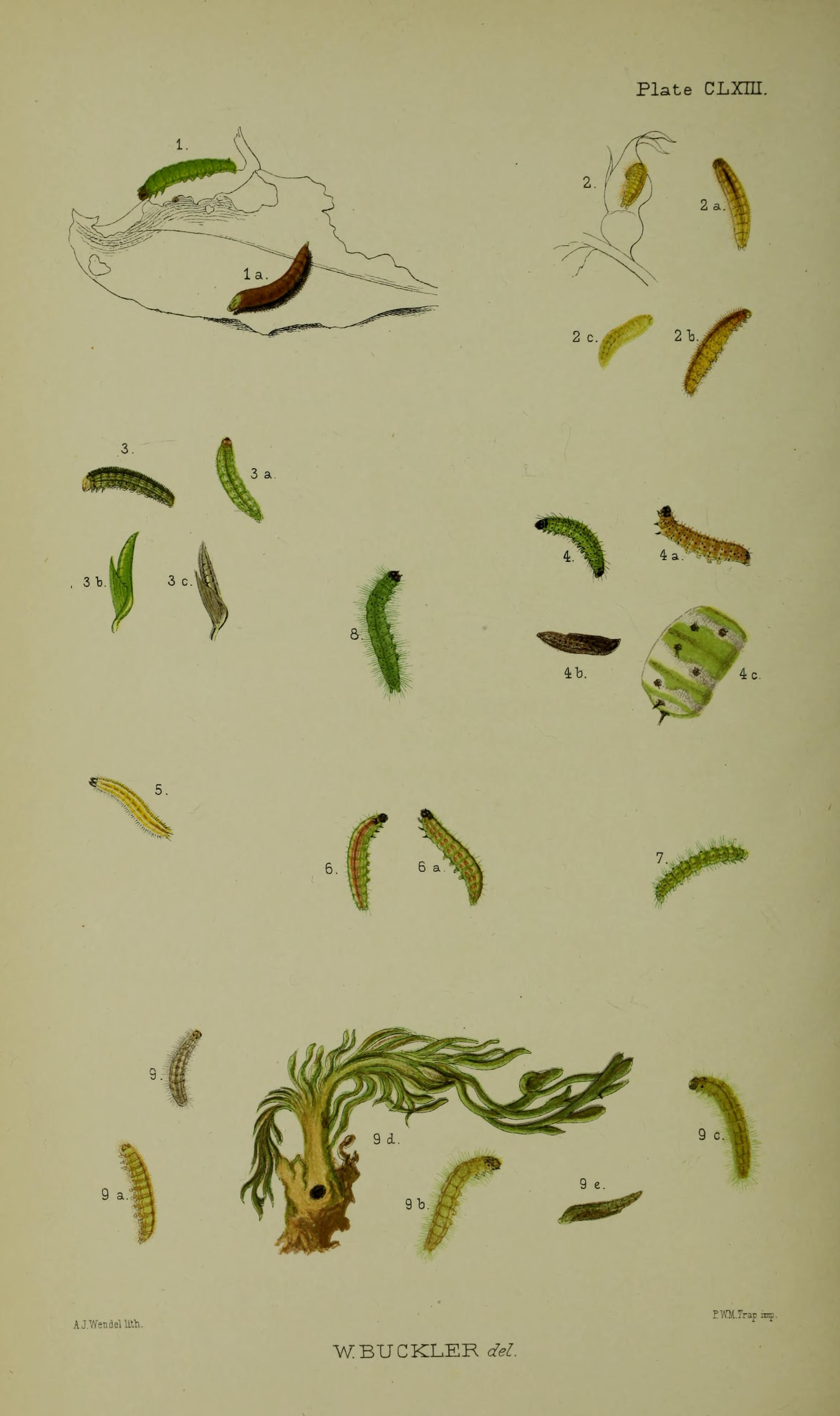
Figs 6, 6a larva after final moult

The larvae feed on the flowers and unripe seeds of various herbaceous plants, but only on shaded plants. Larval food plants include European columbine (Aquilegia vulgaris), common stork's-bill (Erodium cicutarium), meadow crane's-bill (Geranium pratense), bog-myrtle (Myrica gale), primroses (Primula species) and hedge woundwort (Stachys sylvatica).
