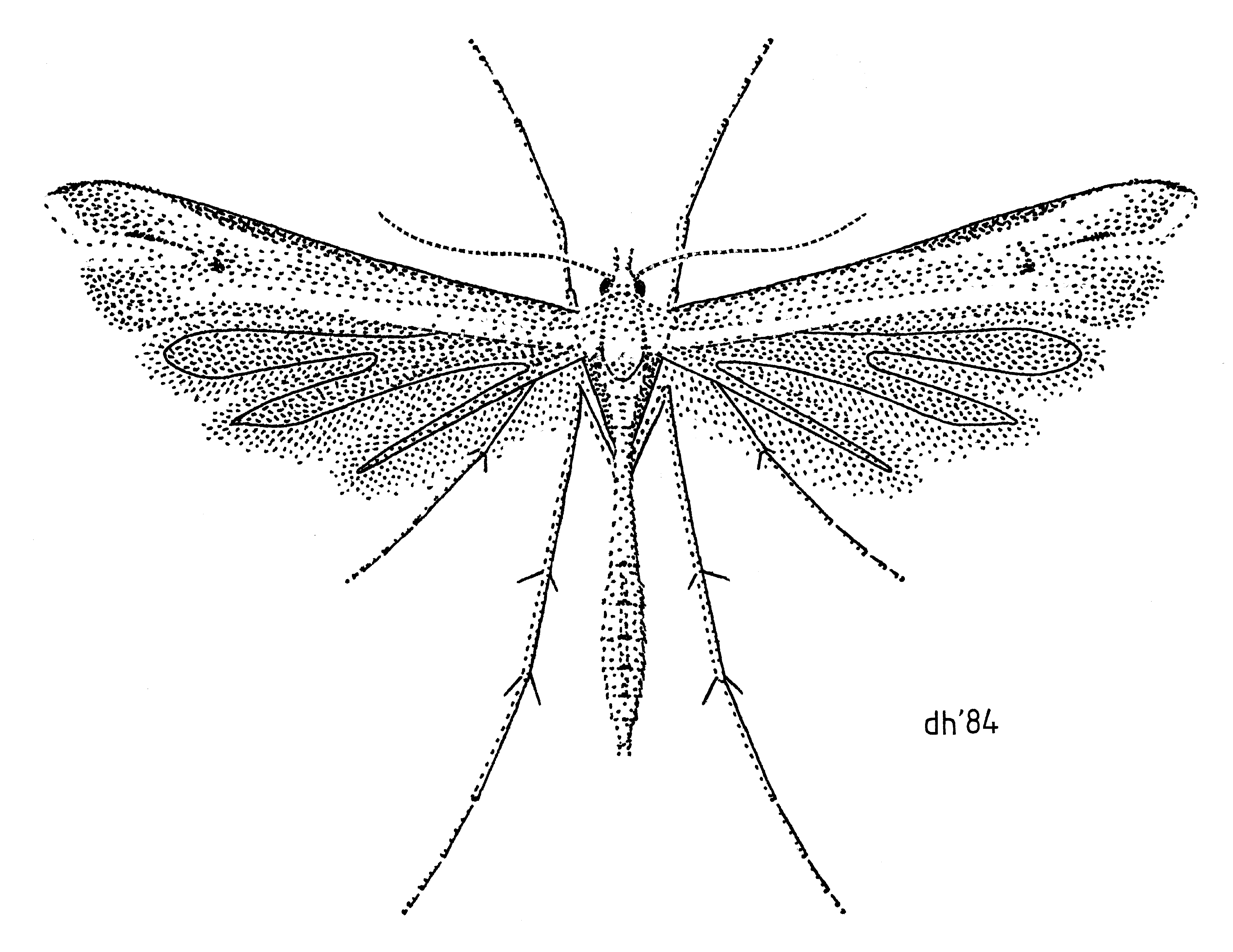

Scientific classification
- Domain: Eukaryota
- Kingdom: Animalia
- Phylum: Arthropoda
- Class: Insecta
- Order: Lepidoptera
- Family: Pterophoridae
- Genus: Amblyptilia
- Species: A. lithoxesta

Binomial name
- Amblyptilia lithoxesta (Meyrick, 1885)

Synonyms
- Mimaeseoptilis lithoxestus Meyrick, 1885; Mimaeseoptilis lithoxesta Meyrick, 1885; Stenoptilia lithoxesta (Meyrick, 1885); Amblyptilia lithoxestes (Meyrick, 1885); Amblyptilia lithoxesta (Meyrick, 1885)

= Amblyptilia lithoxesta =

Species of plume moth, endemic to New Zealand

Amblyptilia lithoxesta is a moth of the family Pterophoridae. It is endemic to New Zealand. It was first described by Edward Meyrick in 1885. This species inhabits rough herbage on mountain sides. Larvae feed on Veronica buchananii. Adults are on the wing in January.

== Taxonomy ==
This species was first described by Edward Meyrick in 1885 using specimens collected in January at Arthur's Pass and named Mimaeseoptilis lithoxestus. Meyrick gave a more detailed description later in 1885. In 1928 George Hudson discussing and illustrating this species in his 1928 publication The butterflies and moths of New Zealand using the name Stenoptilia lithoxesta. In 1988 John S. Dugdale discussed this species under this name. In 1993 Cees Gielis placed this species within the genus Amblyptilia, naming it Amblyptilia lithoxestes. This placement was followed in 2010 in the New Zealand Inventory of Biodiversity but naming the species Amblyptilia lithoxesta. This is the name is used in the New Zealand Arthropod Collection. The male lectotype specimen, collected Arthur's Pass, is held at the Natural History Museum, London.

== Description ==
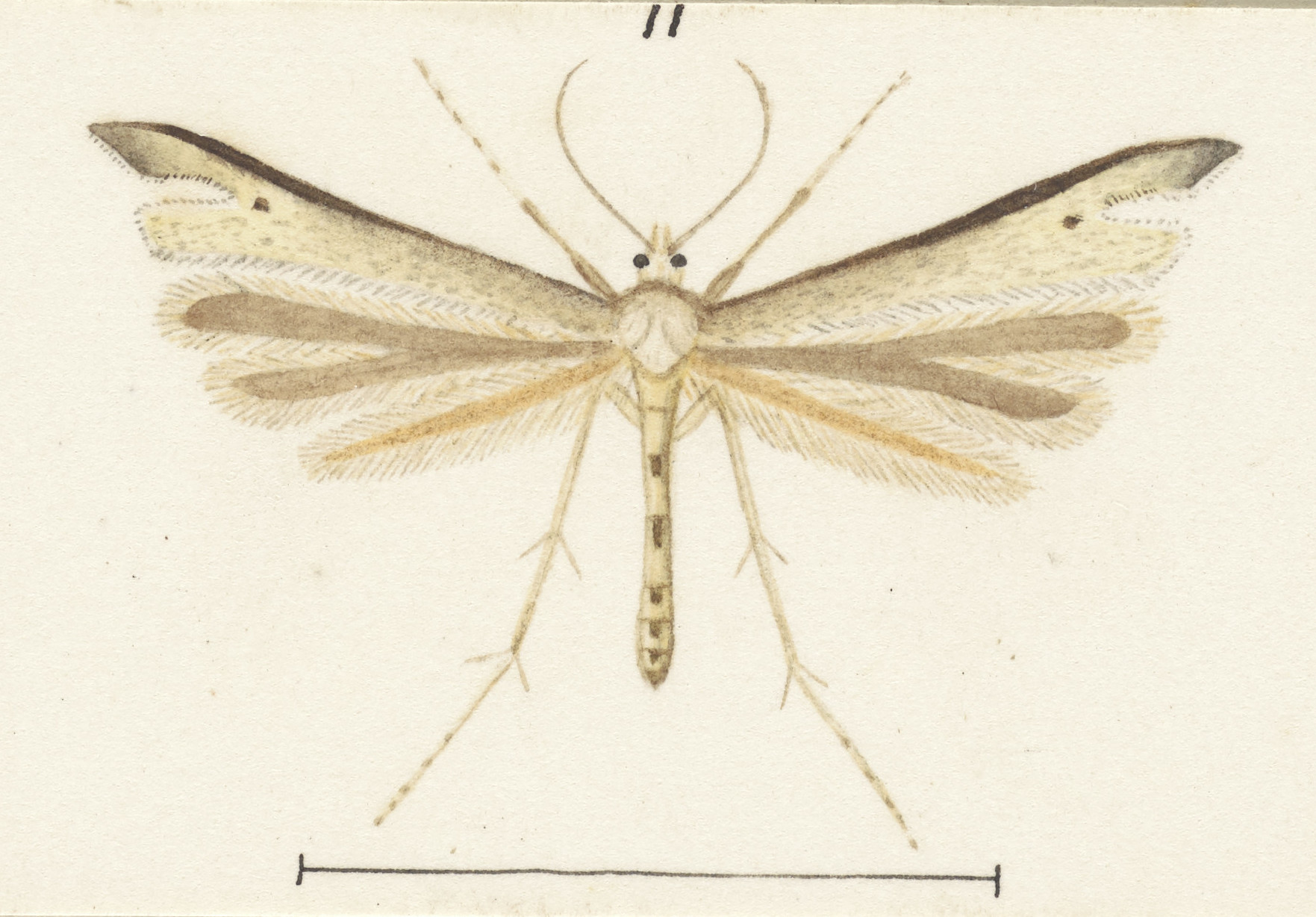
Female adult of A. lithoxesta.

Meyrick described this species as follows:

Male, female.— 23-28 mm. Head, palpi, thorax, and abdomen whitish-ochreous, mixed with white. Antennae fuscous. Legs ochreous-whitish, internally dark fuscous. Forewings light fuscous, suffused with whitish-ochreous posteriorly and towards inner margin, and strewn with white in disc; a sharply-defined very narrow blackish-fuscous costal streak from base to apex, rather strongly dilated between 1/2 and 3/4, obscurely margined beneath with pale whitish-ochreous; a black dot in disc before and rather below cleft; apex and hindmargin rather darker fuscous, somewhat mixed with whitish; a fine black line along lower edge of first segment : cilia whitish-ochreous, on costa dark fuscous, within cleft and on hindmargin of first segment snow-white. Hindwings fuscous-grey; cilia pale greyish-ochreous.

Similar in appearance to Platyptilia charadrias but this species is larger in size, much neater in appearance, sharply defined costal streak, black line on lower margin of first segment, and absence of distinct dark line in cilia.

== Habitat ==
This species inhabits rough herbage on mountain sides.

== Behaviour ==
The adults of this species are on the wing in January.

== Host ==
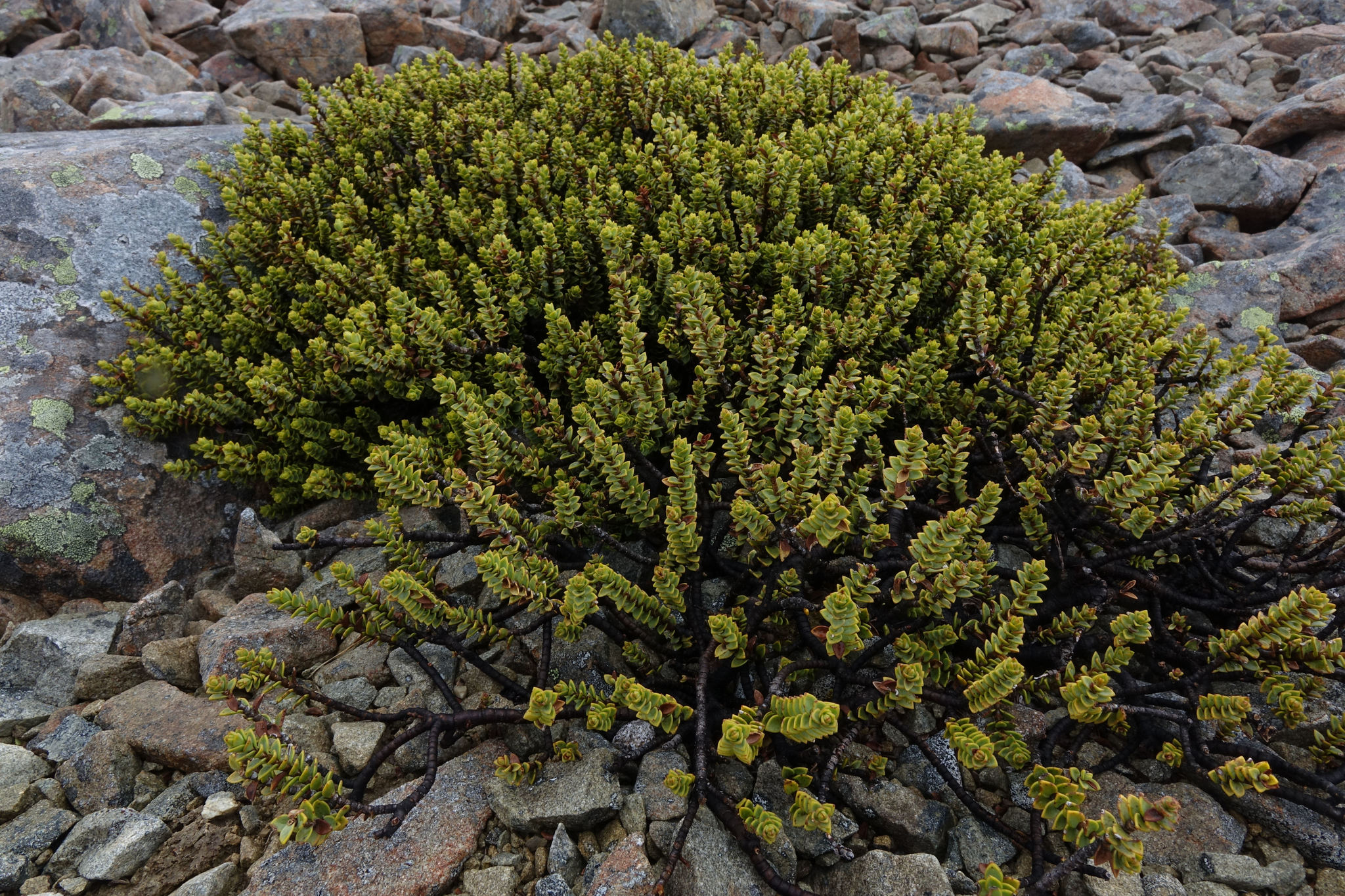
Larval host, Veronica buchananii.

The larvae feed on the buds of Veronica buchananii.
