= Amblyptilia acanthadactyloides =

Scientific classification
- Kingdom: Animalia
- Phylum: Arthropoda
- Clade: Pancrustacea
- Class: Insecta
- Order: Lepidoptera
- Family: Pterophoridae
- Genus: Amblyptilia
- Species: A. acanthadactyloides

Binomial name
- Amblyptilia acanthadactyloides Gibeaux, 1997

Species of plume moth

Amblyptilia acanthadactyloides is a moth of the family Pterophoridae.
