= Amblyptilia incerta =

Scientific classification
- Kingdom: Animalia
- Phylum: Arthropoda
- Clade: Pancrustacea
- Class: Insecta
- Order: Lepidoptera
- Family: Pterophoridae
- Genus: Amblyptilia
- Species: A. incerta

Binomial name
- Amblyptilia incerta Gibeaux, 1994

Species of plume moth

Amblyptilia incerta is a moth of the family Pterophoridae. It is known from Madagascar.
