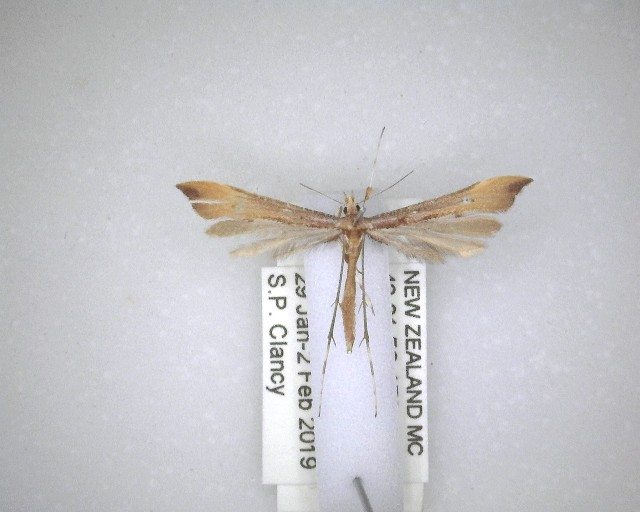

Scientific classification
- Kingdom: Animalia
- Phylum: Arthropoda
- Class: Insecta
- Order: Lepidoptera
- Family: Pterophoridae
- Genus: Amblyptilia
- Species: A. heliastis

Binomial name
- Amblyptilia heliastis (Meyrick, 1885)

Synonyms
- Platyptilia heliastis Meyrick, 1885

= Amblyptilia heliastis =

Species of plume moth

Amblyptilia heliastis is a moth of the family Pterophoridae. This species is endemic to New Zealand. It was first described by Edward Meyrick in 1885. The larvae of this species feed on Veronica species. The adults of this species are on the wing from October to February and can often be found amongst subalpine Veronica species.

== Taxonomy ==
It was first described by Edward Meyrick in 1885 using a male specimen collected at Porter's Pass, Castle Hill by J. D. Enys and named Platyptilia heliastis. Meyrick gave a more full description of this species in May 1885. In 1928 George Hudson discussing and illustrating this species in his 1928 publication The butterflies and moths of New Zealand using this name. In 1988 John S. Dugdale discussed this species also using this name. In 1993 Cees Gielis placed this species within the genus Amblyptilia. This placement was followed in 2010 in the New Zealand Inventory of Biodiversity. The male holotype is held at the Natural History Museum, London.

== Description ==
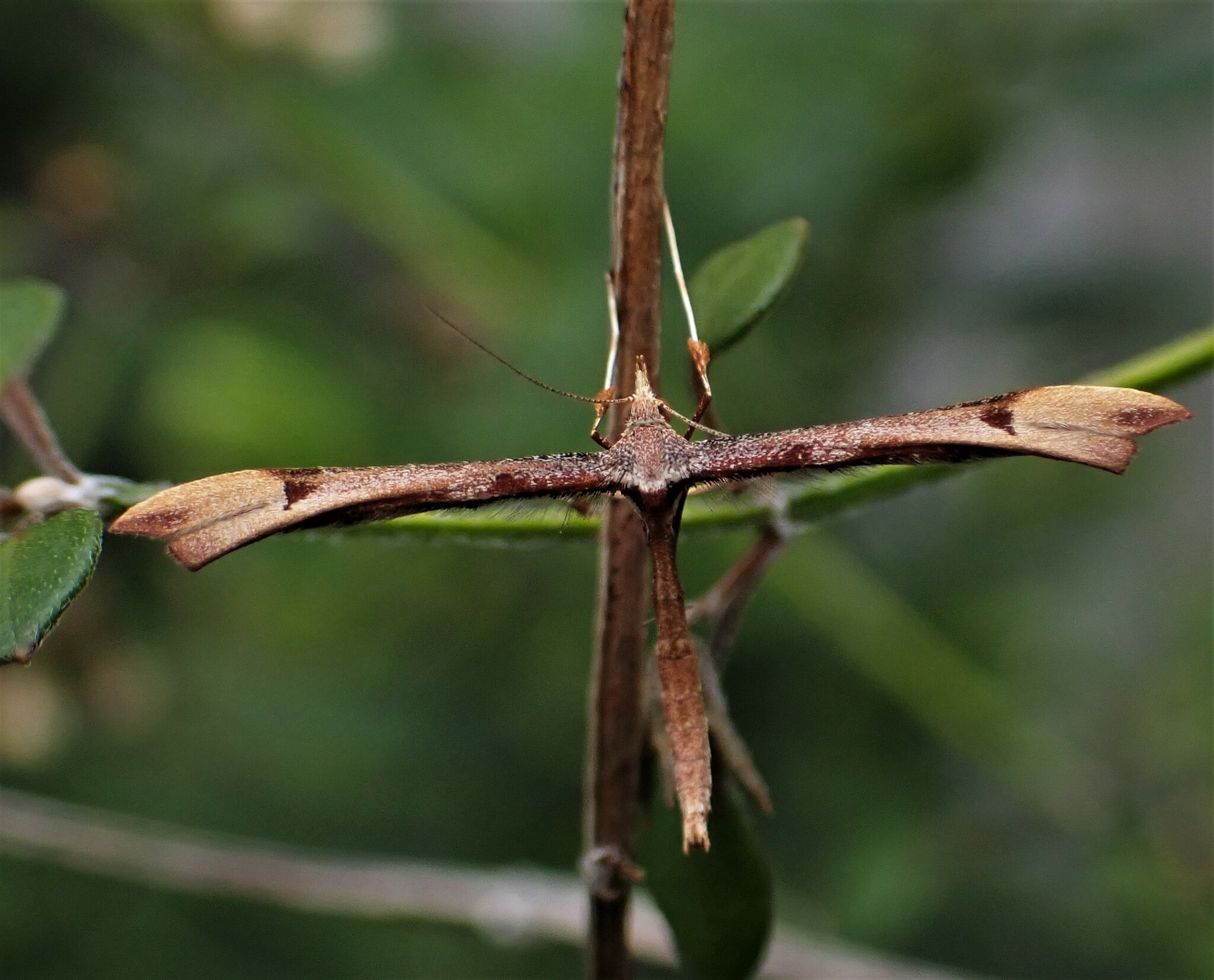

Meyrick described this species as follows:

Male. — 19 mm. Head, palpi, antennas, thorax, abdomen and legs reddish-fuscous, somewhat mixed with whitish, posterior tarsi white. Forewings light brownish-ochreous, suffused with reddish-fuscous towards base and inner margin, and less strongly on hindmargin, and slightly strewn with whitish in disc; costa suffusedly ochreous-whitish towards 3/4, towards base suffused with dark fuscous and obscurely spotted with whitish; a dark fuscous dot before and below cleft : cilia dark reddish-fuscous, on costa whitish-ochreous. Hindwings and cilia light grey, slightly reddish-tinged, lower margin of third segment fringed with coarse black scales from base to 3/4.

The dark fuscous costal triangle on the front edge of the forewing is very variable.

== Distribution ==
This species is endemic to New Zealand. This species has been observed in Mount Arthur, Castle Hill, Humboldt Range and Mount Earnslaw, Lake Wakatipu, at elevations ranging from 2,500 to 4,000 feet above the sea-level.

== Behaviour ==
The adults of this species are on the wing from October to February. Hudson pointed out that when this species is at rest the adult moths give the appearance of two dead leaves emerging from the stem

== Habitat ==
This species inhabits mountain habitat. It can be found amongst subalpine Veronica species.

== Hosts ==
The larvae feed on Veronica species.
