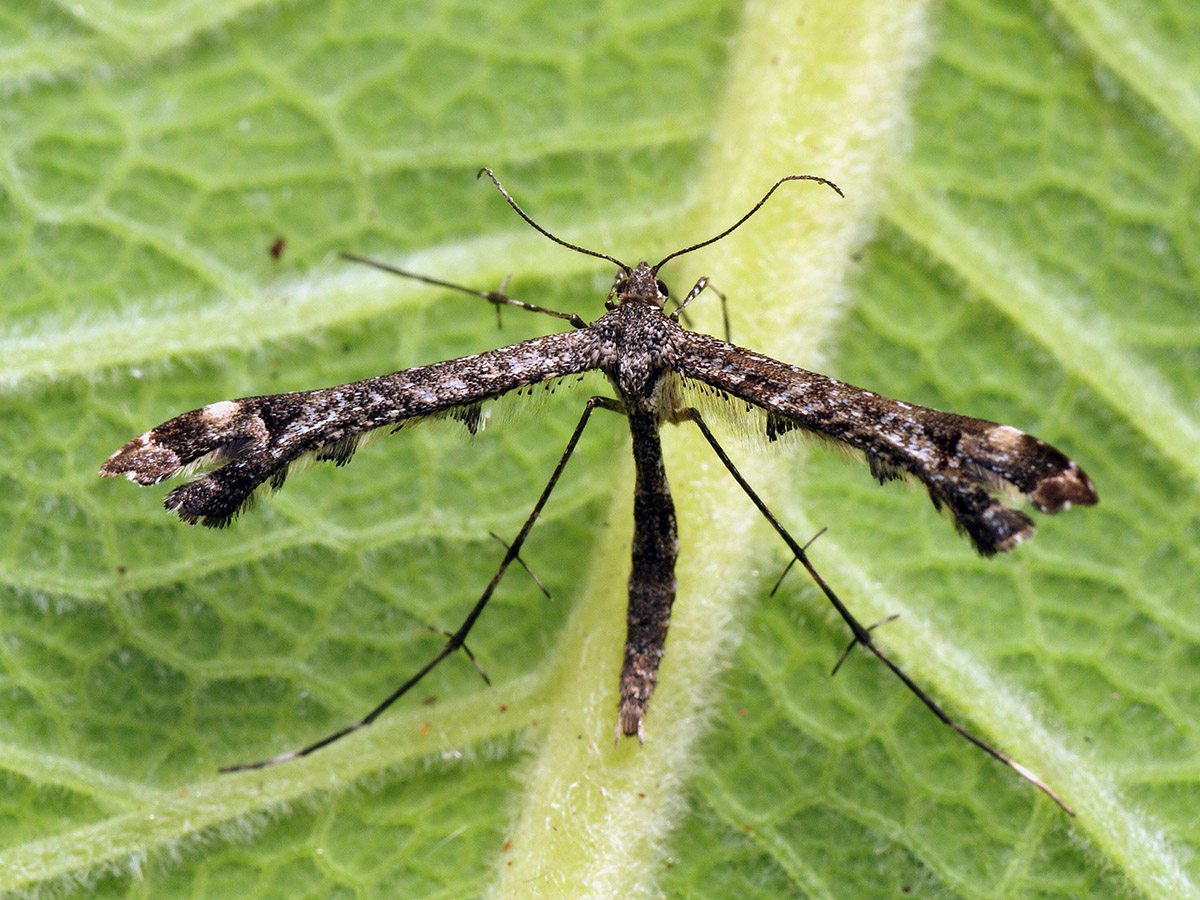
- Amblyptilia punctidactyla

Scientific classification
- Kingdom: Animalia
- Phylum: Arthropoda
- Class: Insecta
- Order: Lepidoptera
- Family: Pterophoridae
- Tribe: Platyptiliini
- Genus: Amblyptilia; Hübner, 1825

Synonyms
- Amplyptilia Hübner, 1825 (misspelling); Amblyptilia Wallengren, 1862 (emendation).

= Amblyptilia =

Plume moth genus

Amblyptilia is a genus of moths in the family Pterophoridae. The genus was raised by the German entomologist, Jacob Hübner in 1825.

== Species ==
- Amblyptilia acanthadactyla (Hübner, 1813)
- Amblyptilia acanthadactyloides
- Amblyptilia aeolodes
- Amblyptilia atrodactyla
- Amblyptilia bowmani
- Amblyptilia clavata
- Amblyptilia deprivatalis
- Amblyptilia direptalis
- Amblyptilia epotis
- Amblyptilia falcatalis
- Amblyptilia fibigeri
- Amblyptilia forcipata
- Amblyptilia galactostacta
- Amblyptilia grisea
- Amblyptilia hebeata
- Amblyptilia heliastis
- Amblyptilia incerta
- Amblyptilia iriana
- Amblyptilia japonica
- Amblyptilia kosteri
- Amblyptilia landryi
- Amblyptilia lithoxesta
- Amblyptilia pica
- Amblyptilia punctidactyla
- Amblyptilia punoica
- Amblyptilia repletalis
- Amblyptilia scutellaris
- Amblyptilia shirozui
- Amblyptilia skoui
- Amblyptilia viettei
- Amblyptilia zhdankoi
