= Amblyptilia landryi =

Scientific classification
- Kingdom: Animalia
- Phylum: Arthropoda
- Class: Insecta
- Order: Lepidoptera
- Family: Pterophoridae
- Genus: Amblyptilia
- Species: A. landryi

Binomial name
- Amblyptilia landryi Gielis, 2006

Species of plume moth

Amblyptilia landryi is a moth of the family Pterophoridae that is known from Honduras.

The wingspan is about 21 millimetres (0.83 in). Adults are on wing in May.
