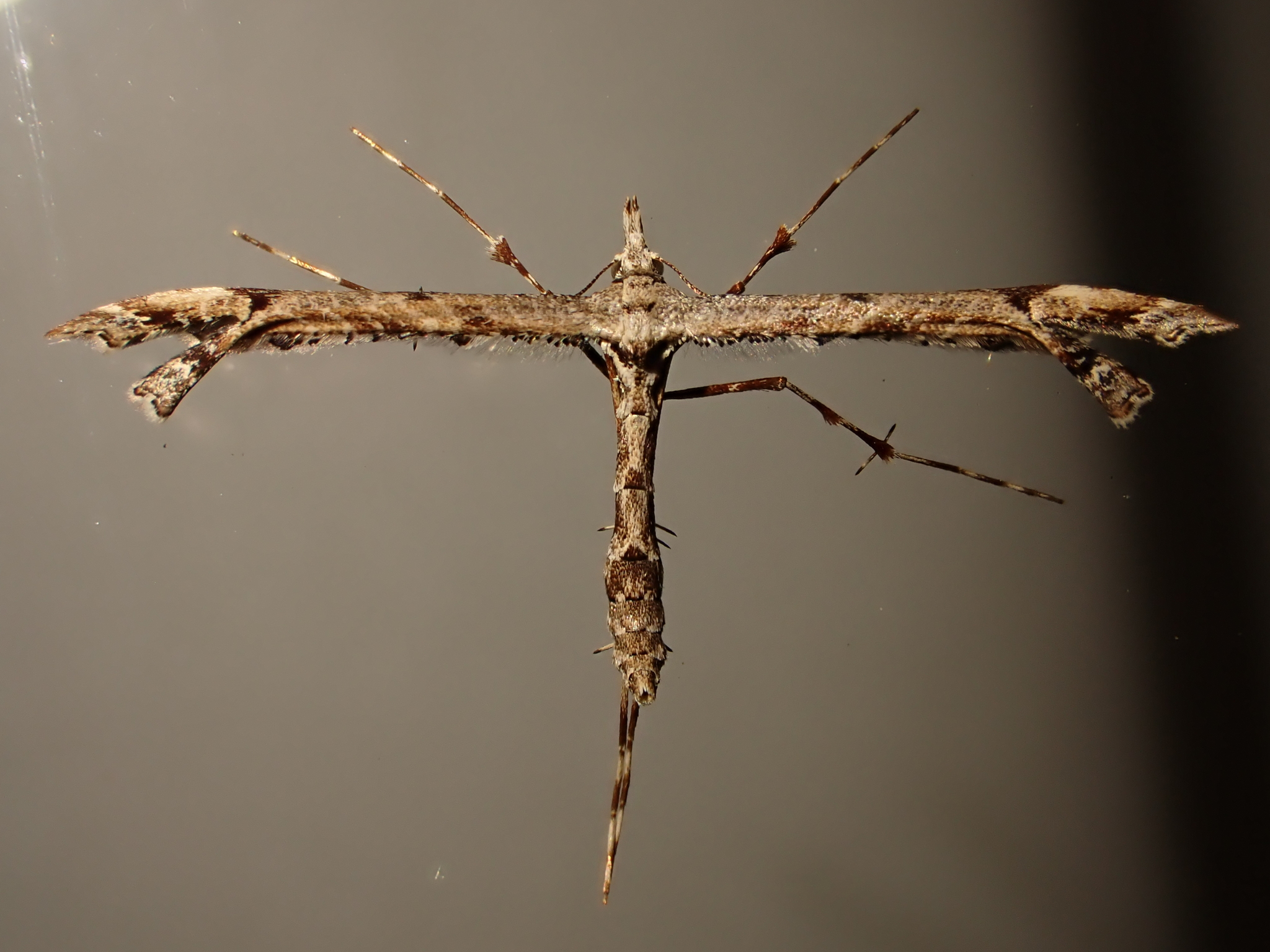

Scientific classification
- Kingdom: Animalia
- Phylum: Arthropoda
- Class: Insecta
- Order: Lepidoptera
- Family: Pterophoridae
- Genus: Amblyptilia
- Species: A. repletalis

Binomial name
- Amblyptilia repletalis (Walker, 1864)

Synonyms
- Platyptilus repletalis Walker, 1864; Platyptilia repletalis Walker, 1864

= Amblyptilia repletalis =

Species of plume moth

Amblyptilia repletalis is a moth of the family Pterophoridae. It is endemic to New Zealand and can be found throughout the country from North Cape to Bluff. The species inhabits a variety of habitats including native forest clearings, shrubland, coastal dunes and gardens. Larvae feed on the seed heads of Plantago plant species. Adults are on the wing all year round and are attracted to light.

== Taxonomy ==
This species was first described by Francis Walker in 1864 and named Platyptilus repletalis. In 1928 George Hudson discussed and illustrated the species under the name Platyptila aeolodes. Hudson, when referring to P. aeolodes as being in the North and South Islands, is referring to this species. In 1988 John S. Dugdale discussed this species under the name Platyptila repletalis. In 1993 Cees Gielis placed this species within the genus Amblyptilia. This placement was followed in 2010 in the New Zealand Inventory of Biodiversity. The male lectotype specimen, collected in Auckland, is held at the Natural History Museum, London.

== Description ==
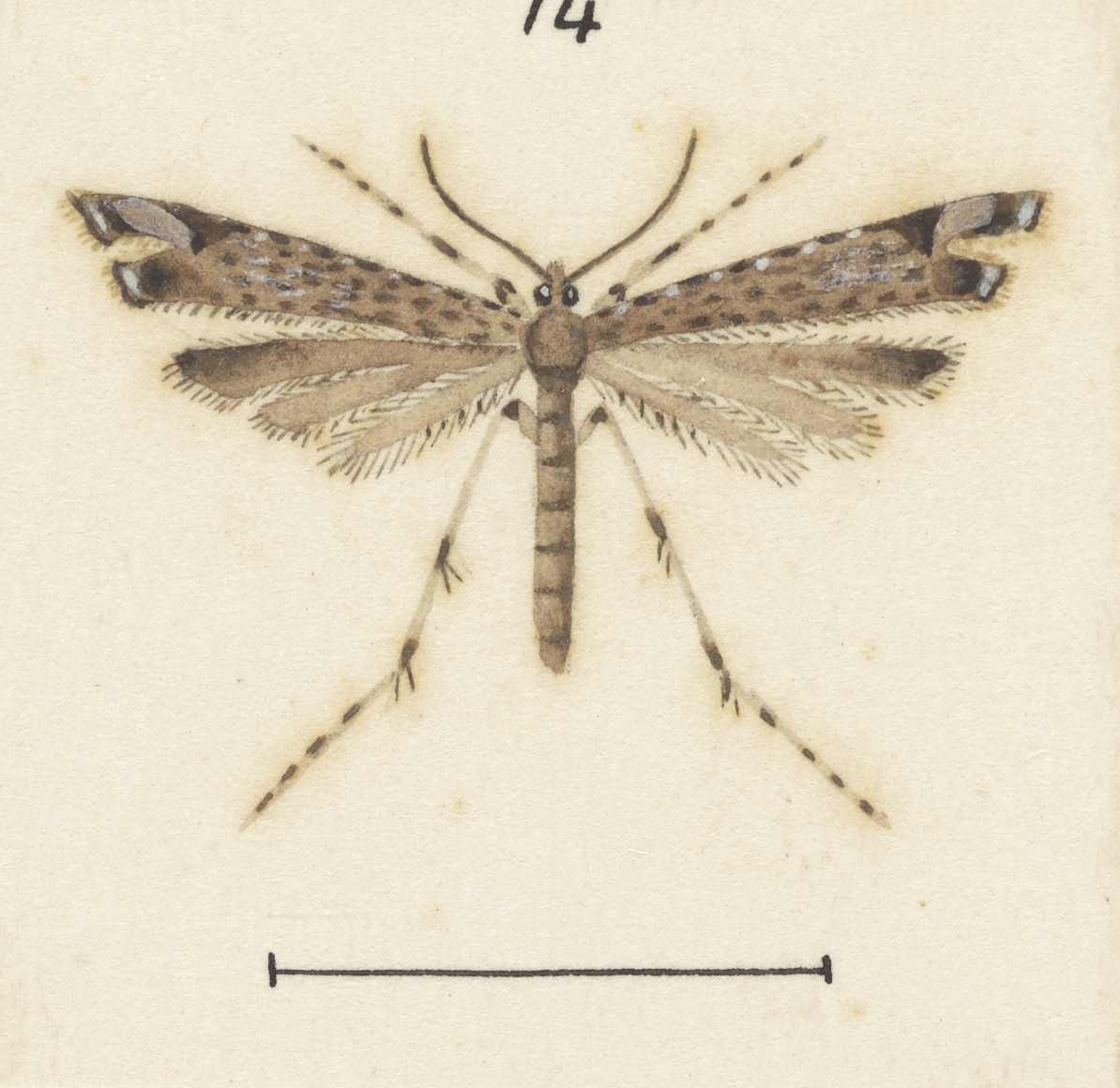
Illustration by George Hudson.

Walker described the female adult as follows:

Female. Ferruginous, slender. Palpi porrect, lanceolate. Tibiae and tarsi with whitish bands. Wings rather broad. Forewings acute, with many cinereous costal points, which are oblique outward towards the disk, and are more numerous than the cinereous streaks, which are oblique inward from the middle of the breadth to the interior border; two brown costal marks; first mark at one-third of the length; second at two-thirds of the length, larger than the first; a pale fawn-coloured costal patch between the second streak and a cinereous transverse zigzag submarginal line, which is partly bordered on the inner side by deep black; space between the submarginal line and the undulating black marginal line dark cinereous; fringe pale. Length of the body 6 lines; of the wings 12 lines.

The wingspan of this species is between 14 and 21 mm. This species is very similar in appearance to A. falcatalis but is a smaller moth with a more indistinct dark triangle shaped pattern on its forewings.

== Distribution ==
This species is endemic to New Zealand and can be found throughout the country from North Cape to Bluff.

== Habitat and hosts ==
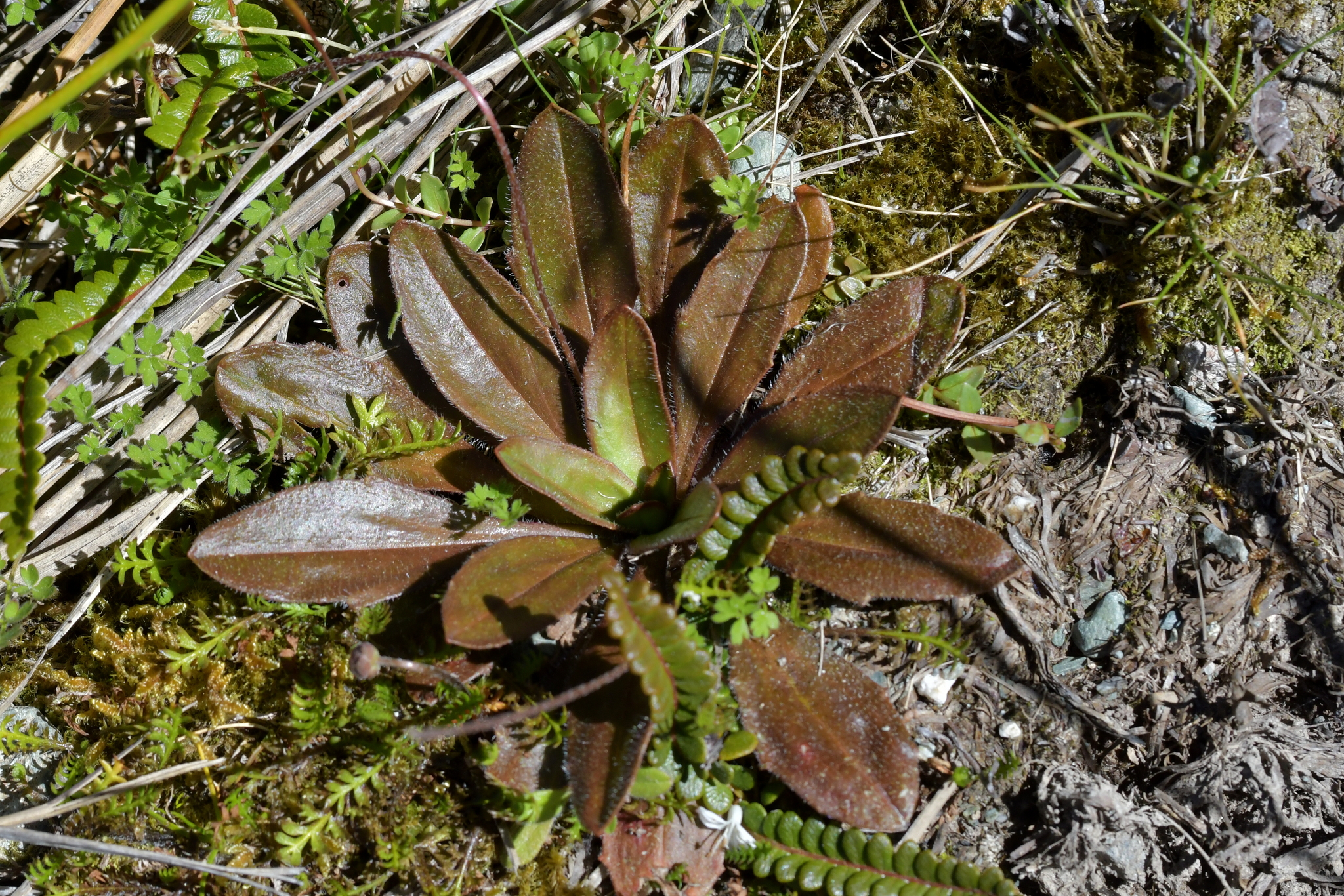
Plantago novae-zelandiae, a possible larval host.

A. repletalis can be found in a variety of habitats including in native forest clearings, shrubland, coastal dunes and gardens. The larvae feed on the seed-heads of Plantago species.

== Behaviour ==
Larvae pupate with no cocoon but the pupa is attached by a silk thread to a silk pad on the host plant. Adults are on the wing throughout the year and are active in the evening and at night. They are attracted to light.
