= Amblyptilia direptalis =

Scientific classification
- Kingdom: Animalia
- Phylum: Arthropoda
- Class: Insecta
- Order: Lepidoptera
- Family: Pterophoridae
- Genus: Amblyptilia
- Species: A. direptalis

Binomial name
- Amblyptilia direptalis (Walker, 1864)

Synonyms
- Oxyptilus direptalis Walker, 1864; Platyptilia amblydectis Meyrick, 1932

Species of plume moth

Amblyptilia direptalis is a moth of the family Pterophoridae. It is known from Ethiopia, Kenya, South Africa, Tanzania, India and Sri Lanka.

The larvae feed on Scutellaria discolor and Teucrium quadrifarium.
