= Amblyptilia fibigeri =

Scientific classification
- Kingdom: Animalia
- Phylum: Arthropoda
- Class: Insecta
- Order: Lepidoptera
- Family: Pterophoridae
- Genus: Amblyptilia
- Species: A. fibigeri

Binomial name
- Amblyptilia fibigeri Gielis, 1999

Species of plume moth

Amblyptilia fibigeri is a moth of the family Pterophoridae.
