= Amblyptilia kosteri =

Scientific classification
- Kingdom: Animalia
- Phylum: Arthropoda
- Class: Insecta
- Order: Lepidoptera
- Family: Pterophoridae
- Genus: Amblyptilia
- Species: A. kosteri

Binomial name
- Amblyptilia kosteri Gielis, 2006

Species of plume moth

Amblyptilia kosteri is a moth of the family Pterophoridae that is known from Argentina and Brazil.

The wingspan is about 20 millimetres (0.79 in). Adults are on wing in June and November.
