= Amblyptilia viettei =

Scientific classification
- Kingdom: Animalia
- Phylum: Arthropoda
- Clade: Pancrustacea
- Class: Insecta
- Order: Lepidoptera
- Family: Pterophoridae
- Genus: Amblyptilia
- Species: A. viettei

Binomial name
- Amblyptilia viettei Gibeaux, 1994

Species of plume moth

Amblyptilia viettei is a moth of the family Pterophoridae that is known from Madagascar.
