= Amblyptilia shirozui =

Scientific classification
- Domain: Eukaryota
- Kingdom: Animalia
- Phylum: Arthropoda
- Class: Insecta
- Order: Lepidoptera
- Family: Pterophoridae
- Genus: Amblyptilia
- Species: A. shirozui

Binomial name
- Amblyptilia shirozui (Yano, 1965)

Synonyms
- Platyptilia shirozui Yano, 1965

Species of plume moth

Amblyptilia shirozui is a moth of the family Pterophoridae. It was described by Yano in 1965 and is found in Taiwan.
