= Amblyptilia galactostacta =

Scientific classification
- Domain: Eukaryota
- Kingdom: Animalia
- Phylum: Arthropoda
- Class: Insecta
- Order: Lepidoptera
- Family: Pterophoridae
- Genus: Amblyptilia
- Species: A. galactostacta

Binomial name
- Amblyptilia galactostacta (Diakonoff, 1952)

Synonyms
- Stenoptilia galactostacta Diakonoff, 1952

Species of plume moth

Amblyptilia galactostacta is a moth of the family Pterophoridae. It is known from New Guinea.
