= Amblyptilia iriana =

Scientific classification
- Domain: Eukaryota
- Kingdom: Animalia
- Phylum: Arthropoda
- Class: Insecta
- Order: Lepidoptera
- Family: Pterophoridae
- Genus: Amblyptilia
- Species: A. iriana

Binomial name
- Amblyptilia iriana (Diakonoff, 1952)

Synonyms
- Stenoptilia iriana Diakonoff, 1952

Species of plume moth

Amblyptilia iriana is a moth of the family Pterophoridae that is known from Papua New Guinea.
