= Amblyptilia punoica =

Scientific classification
- Kingdom: Animalia
- Phylum: Arthropoda
- Class: Insecta
- Order: Lepidoptera
- Family: Pterophoridae
- Genus: Amblyptilia
- Species: A. punoica

Binomial name
- Amblyptilia punoica Gielis, 1996

Species of plume moth

Amblyptilia punoica is a moth of the family Pterophoridae that is known from Peru.

The wingspan is about 25 millimetres (0.98 in). Adults are on wing from end March to the beginning of April.
