= Amblyptilia scutellaris =

Scientific classification
- Domain: Eukaryota
- Kingdom: Animalia
- Phylum: Arthropoda
- Class: Insecta
- Order: Lepidoptera
- Family: Pterophoridae
- Genus: Amblyptilia
- Species: A. scutellaris

Binomial name
- Amblyptilia scutellaris (C. Felder, R. Felder & Rogenhofer, 1875)

Synonyms
- Platyptilia scutellaris Felder & Rogenhofer, 1875

Species of plume moth

Amblyptilia scutellaris is a moth of the family Pterophoridae that is known from Colombia.

The wingspan is about 18 millimetres (0.71 in).
