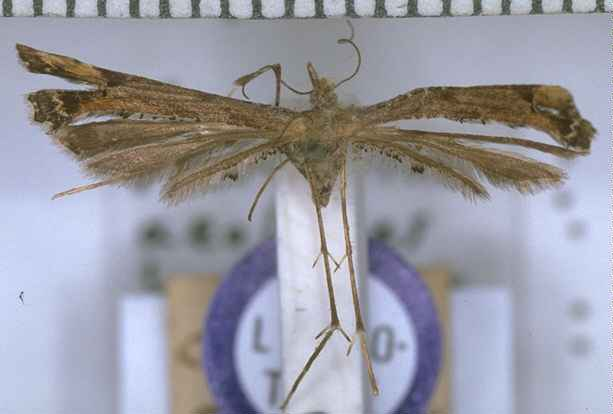
- Male lectotype

Conservation status
- Data Deficit (NZ TCS)

Scientific classification
- Kingdom: Animalia
- Phylum: Arthropoda
- Clade: Pancrustacea
- Class: Insecta
- Order: Lepidoptera
- Family: Pterophoridae
- Genus: Amblyptilia
- Species: A. aeolodes

Binomial name
- Amblyptilia aeolodes (Meyrick, 1902)

Synonyms
- Platyptilia aeolodes Meyrick, 1902; Platyptilia aelodes Meyrick, 1902 (misspelling)

= Amblyptilia aeolodes =

Species of plume moth, endemic to New Zealand

Amblyptilia aeolodes is a moth of the family Pterophoridae. This species was first described by Edward Meyrick in 1902. It is endemic to New Zealand and is found on the Chatham Islands, Big South Cape Island, and the subantarctic Auckland and Campbell Islands.The larvae feed on dicotyledonous herbs. In 2025 this species was classified as "data deficient" under the New Zealand Threat Classification System by the Department of Conservation.

== Taxonomy ==
This species was first described by Edward Meyrick in 1902 and originally named Platyptilia aeolodes. In 1928 George Hudson discussed and illustrated the species. However Hudson, when referring to P. aeolodes as being in the North and South Islands, is referring to Platyptilia repletalis (now known as Amblyptilia repletalis). In 1971 and again in 1988 John S. Dugdale discussed this species under the name Platyptilia aelodes, a misspelling of the original name. In 1993 Cees Gielis placed this species within the genus Amblyptilia. This placement was followed in 2010 in the New Zealand Inventory of Biodiversity. The lectotype specimen, collected by J. Fourgère at Chatham Island, is held at the Natural History Museum, London.

== Description ==
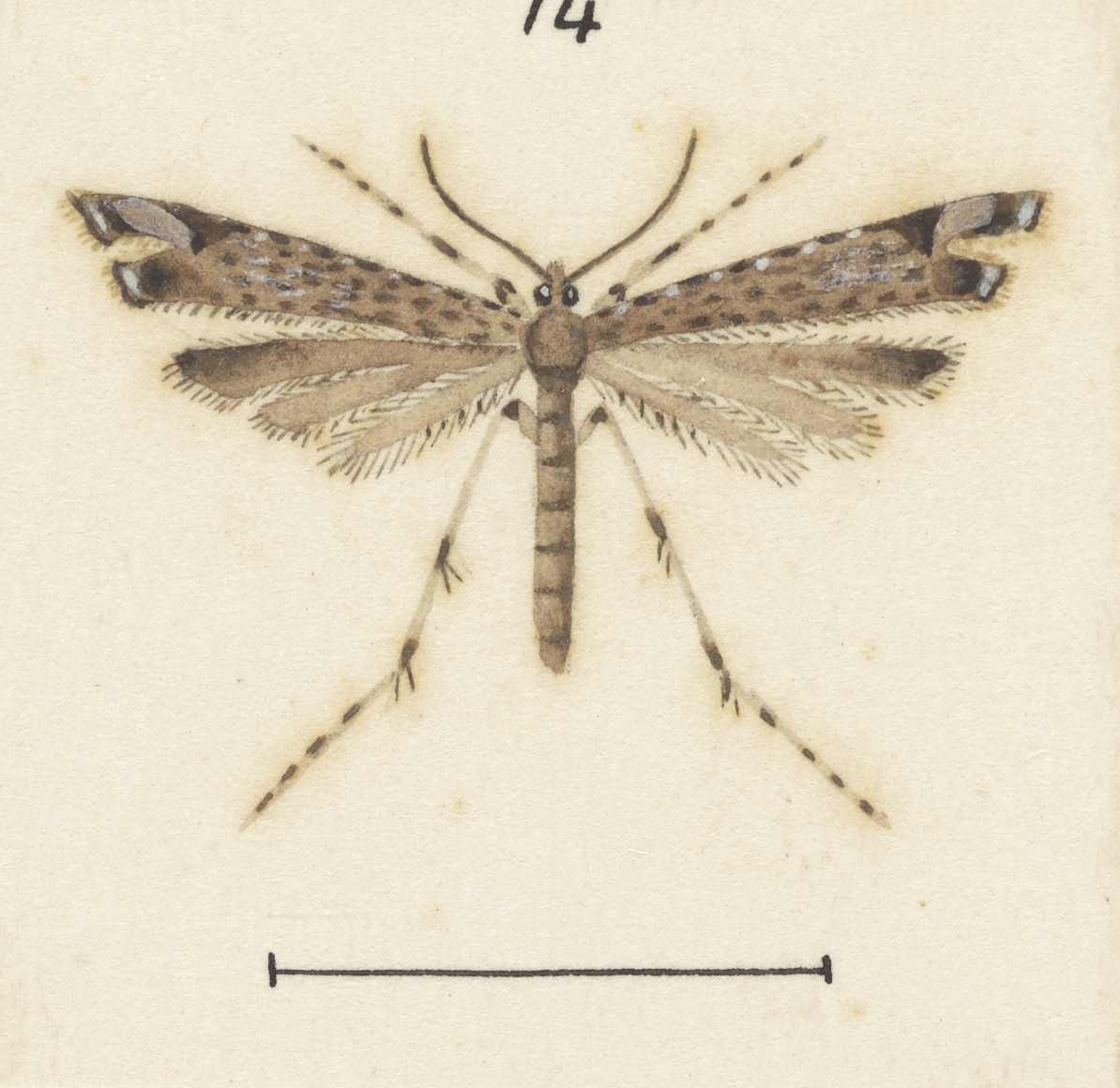
A. aeolodes illustrated by George Hudson.

Meyrick described this species as follows:

♂♀. 17-22 m.m. Head, palpi, and thorax ochreous, variably mixed with whitish and reddish- fuscous, frontal tuft 1; palpi nearly 4. Middle tibiae distinctly tufted in middle and at apex. Forewings with apex produced, termen prominently angulated on vein 3 (middle of second segment); reddish-lirown, varying to light reddish-ochreous, variably mixed with whitish and dark fuscous; costa darker, strigulated with whitish; a dark reddish-brown sub-triangular spot on costa at 2/3, anteriorly undefined, its apex touching a blackish transverse dot before fissure, posteriorly followed by more or less ochreous-whitish suffusion; subterminal line sharply dentate, ochreous-whitish, usually nearly obsolete, but in one specimen in which the terminal area is suffused with dark reddish-brown very conspicuous : cilia reddish-fuscous, barred with whitish, on termen with tips beyond a blackish median line whitish, on dorsum with numerous small projections of black scales and a larger black scale- tooth at 2/3. Hindwings fuscous : cilia whitish-fuscous, with indistinct darker median line on termen; on dorsum with rather large undefined black scale-tooth scarcely beyond middle of third segment, and numerous black-tipped projecting scales between this and base.

This species varies in intensity of colouration but can be distinguished from A. falcatalis as A. aeolodes is smaller and darker and the second segment of the forewing has a more prominent angle on the edge most distant from the body. Also the principal hindwing scale tuft on the dorsal side of the forewings is only slightly beyond the middle where as with A. falcatalis the scale tuft is broader and considerably beyond the middle. A. aeolodes is very similar in appearance to A. repletalis, a species found on the North and South Islands. However there are differences in the genitalia of these two species. Also A. repletalis is a smaller moth with a more indistinct dark triangle shaped pattern on its forewings. Dugdale described the larva of this species as follows:

Integument evenly scobinate, scobinations rounded, cobbled. Meso, metathorax, and abdominal segments 1-7 with evenly distributed capitate short black setulae; these restricted to the mesal part of the shield on prothorax, to around the spiracular area on the 8th abdominal segment, and to around the D setae on 9th abdominal segment. Anal shield with no basal setulae. SV groups on abdomen bi-setose on segments 1 and 7, trisetose on 2-6, single on segments 8 and 9. SD2 minute, anterodorsad of spiracle on all abdominal segments except on 8th, where it is directly anterad; margin of spiracle on 8th segment stouter than on other segments.

== Distribution ==
A. aeolodes is endemic to New Zealand. It is found in southern most islands of New Zealand, specifically on the Chatham Islands, Big South Cape Island, and the subantarctic Auckland and Campbell Islands.

== Hosts ==
The larvae feed on dicotyledonous herbs.

== Conservation status ==
In 2025 this species was classified by the New Zealand Department of Conservation as "data deficient" under the New Zealand Threat Classification System as a result of the difficulty in identifying the species.
