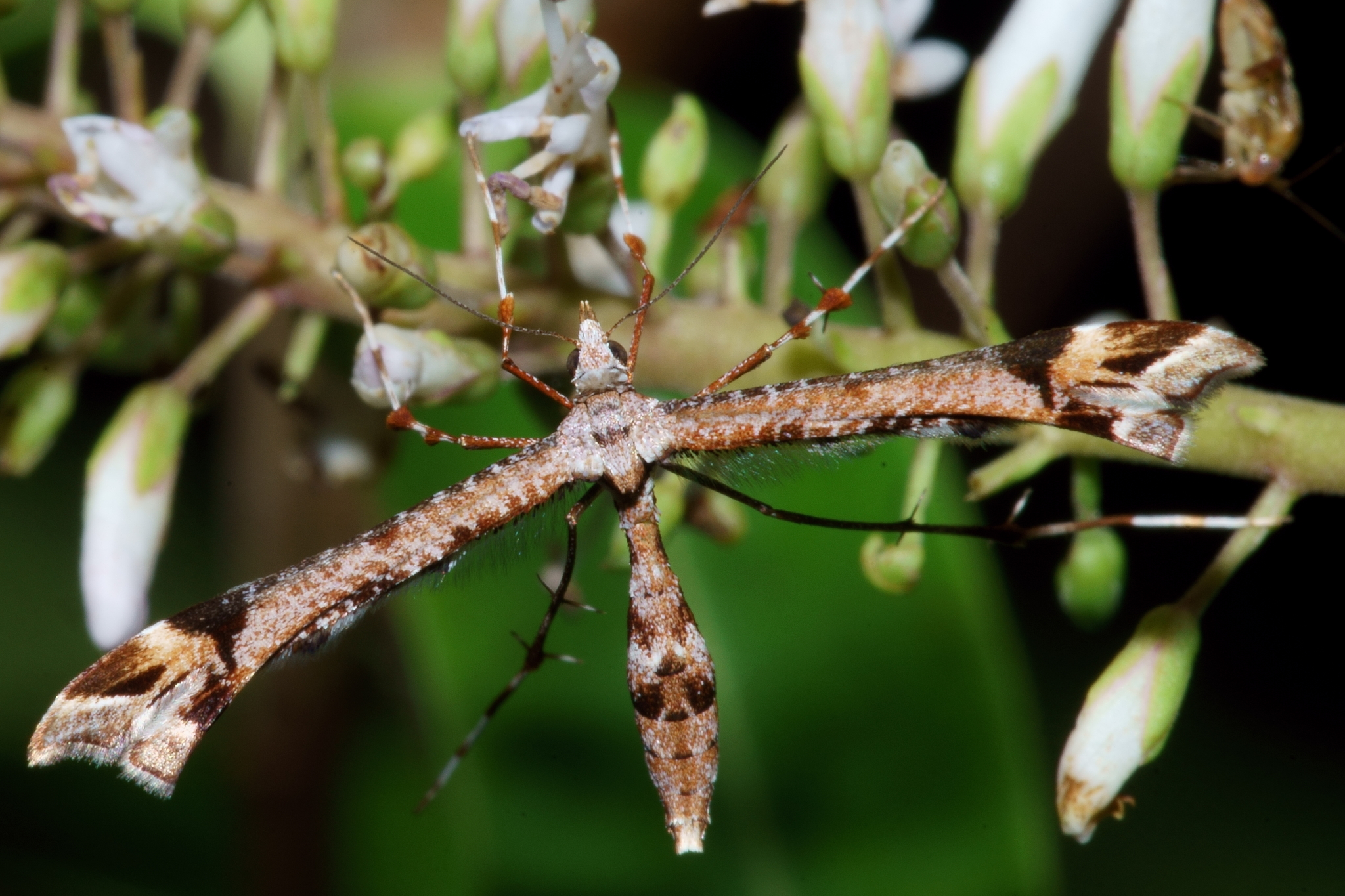

Scientific classification
- Kingdom: Animalia
- Phylum: Arthropoda
- Class: Insecta
- Order: Lepidoptera
- Family: Pterophoridae
- Genus: Amblyptilia
- Species: A. falcatalis

Binomial name
- Amblyptilia falcatalis (Walker, 1864)

Synonyms
- Platyptilus falcatalis Walker, 1864; Platyptila falcatalis Walker, 1864; Platyptilia falcstalis (Walker, 1864); Platyptilia haasti Felder & Rogenhofer, 1875; Platyptilia indubitata Philpott, 1929

= Amblyptilia falcatalis =

Species of plume moth, endemic to New Zealand

Amblyptilia falcatalis, the common Hebe plume moth, is a species of moth of the family Pterophoridae. This species was first described by Francis Walker and is endemic to New Zealand. This species can be found in both the North and South Islands. The larval host plants are in the Veronica (also known as Hebe) genus and include Veronica stricta, Veronica salicifolia, Veronica elliptica, Veronica macrocarpa and Veronica speciosa. This moth likely has two broods a year and adults have been observed all year round.

== Taxonomy ==
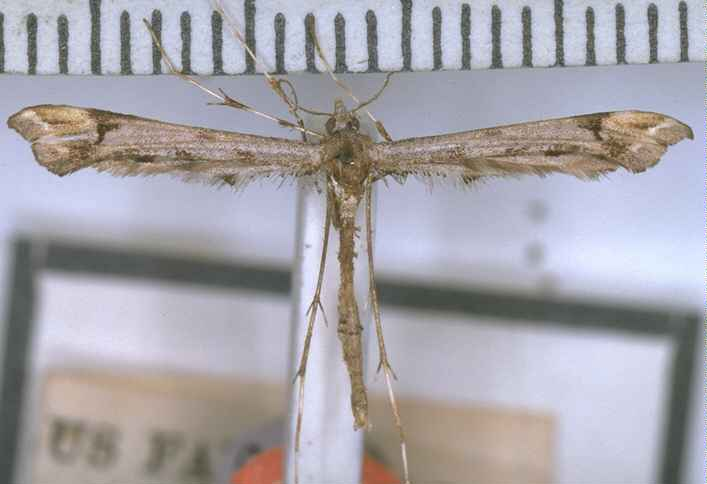
A. falcatalis male lectotype

This species was first described by Francis Walker in 1864 using specimens collected in Nelson by T. R. Oxley. Walker originally named the species Platyptilus falcatalis. In 1875 Cajetan von Felder and Alois Friedrich Rogenhofer, thinking they were describing a new species, named it Platyptilus haasti. John S. Dugdale synonymised this name with P. facatalis in 1988. In 1923, thinking he was describing a new species Alfred Philpott named this species Platyptilia ferruginea. However, as this name was preoccupied by Crocydoscelus ferrugineum, Philpott gave the species the new name of Platyptilia indubitata. This later name was synonymised with P. falcatalis in 1928 by George Hudson. Hudson would go on to discuss the larva and pupa of this species in books published in 1939 and 1950. In 1993 Cees Gielis placed this species within the genus Amblyptilia. This placement was followed in 2010 in the New Zealand Inventory of Biodiversity. The lectotype specimen, collected in Nelson, is held at the Natural History Museum, London.

== Description ==
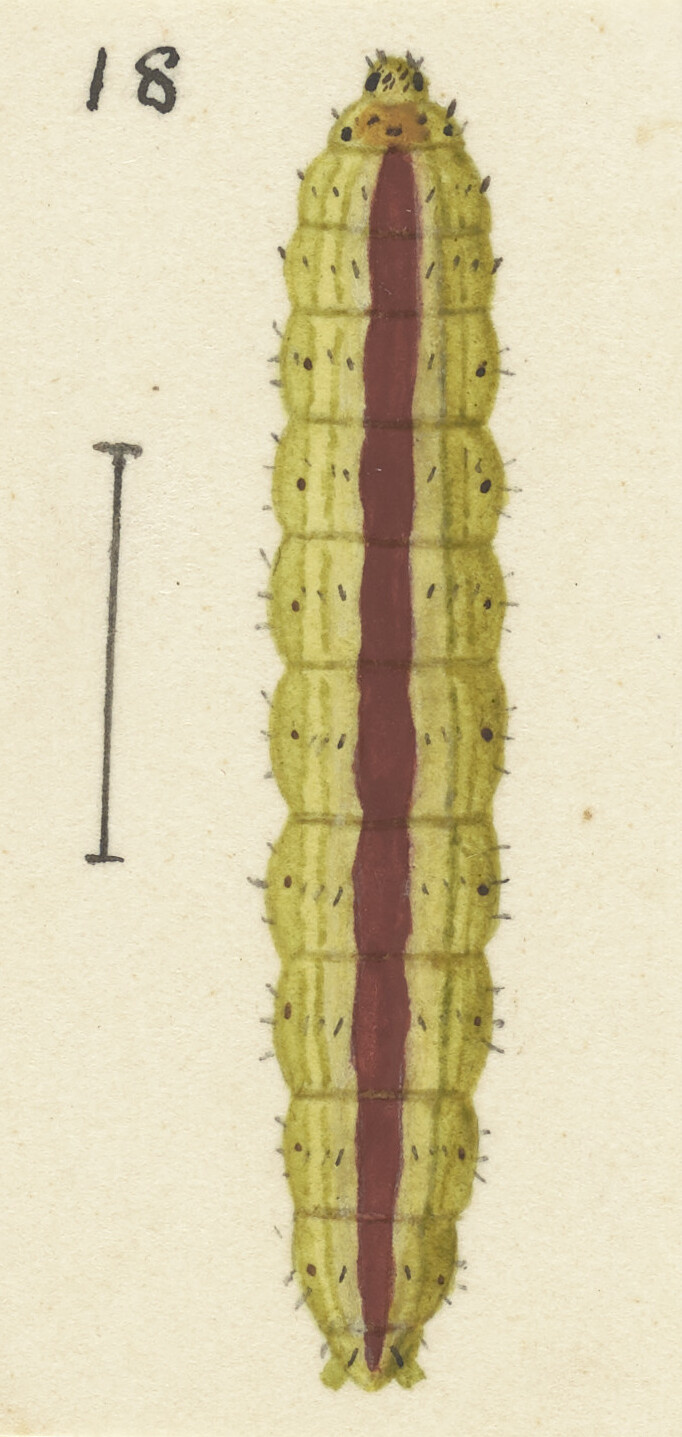
Larva (1939)

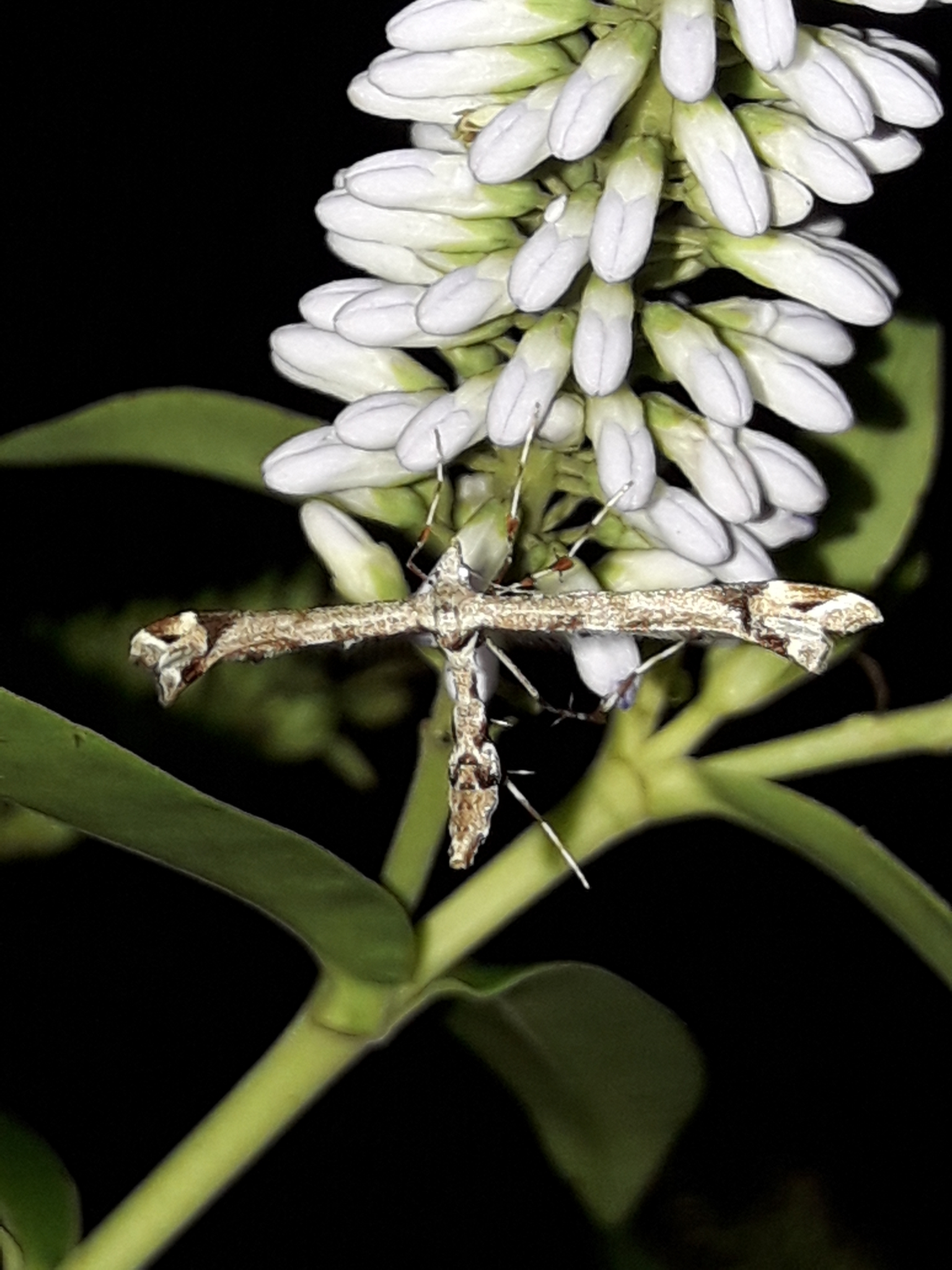
A. falcatalis on a Veronica species.

In 1939 Hudson discussed and illustrated of the larva of this species. He described the larva:

The larva, which feeds in the opening leaf and flower buds of Hebe salicifolia, is about 1 inch in length, fairly stout, slightly tapering at each end, with segments well defined; head small, greenish, mottled with brown; segment 2 with obscure ochreous dorsal plate; rest of body yellowish-green, darker on sides and under-surface; a broad, slightly irregular, deep red dorsal line from segment 3 to anal extremity; several slightly darker green subdorsal lines; warts minute, emitting short slender blackish bristles. Full-grown larvae occur at the end of October, and at the end of February, there being most likely two complete broods in the season.

He again discussed the larva of this species in 1950 and also illustrated the larva as well as the pupa of this species. Hudson described the specimen upon which he based his 1950 saying that the green subdorsal lines he described in 1939 were replaced by faint, broken reddish coloured lines. Hudson also stated that the larva of A. facatalis had black legs which appeared to be characteristic for this species.

Hudson also described the pupa:

The length of the pupa is slightly under 1/2 inch (11 mm.). In form it is very like the pupa of P. aeolodes; the dorsal appendages are slightly shorter and flatter, with a small spine projecting from the extremity of each; general colour rather dull reddish-brown, a little paler on ventral surface, and faintly mottled with darker brown; an obscure paler lateral line; abdomen with four rows of conspicuous whitish warts. The pupa is suspended by the tail, with the ventral surface appressed to supporting object.

Walker originally described the adult male of the species as follows:

Male. Ferruginous. Tibiae and tarsi ferruginous, with two whitish bands on each. Fore wings falcate, speckled with cinereous; a triangular black costal spot beyond two-thirds of the length, attenuated towards the disk; a pale lawn-coloured costal spot adjoining the outer side of the black spot, including a black longitudinal streak, another black streak behind the first, partly bordered by an acute angle, which is formed by the submarginal transverse whitish line; three elongated irregular blackish marks along the interior border. Length of the body 6 — 7 lines; of the wings 12—14 lines.

This adult moths are very similar in appearance to A. repletalis. However A. falcatalis has a more rectangular and parallel-edged second lobe of the forewing than P. carduidactyla.

== Distribution ==
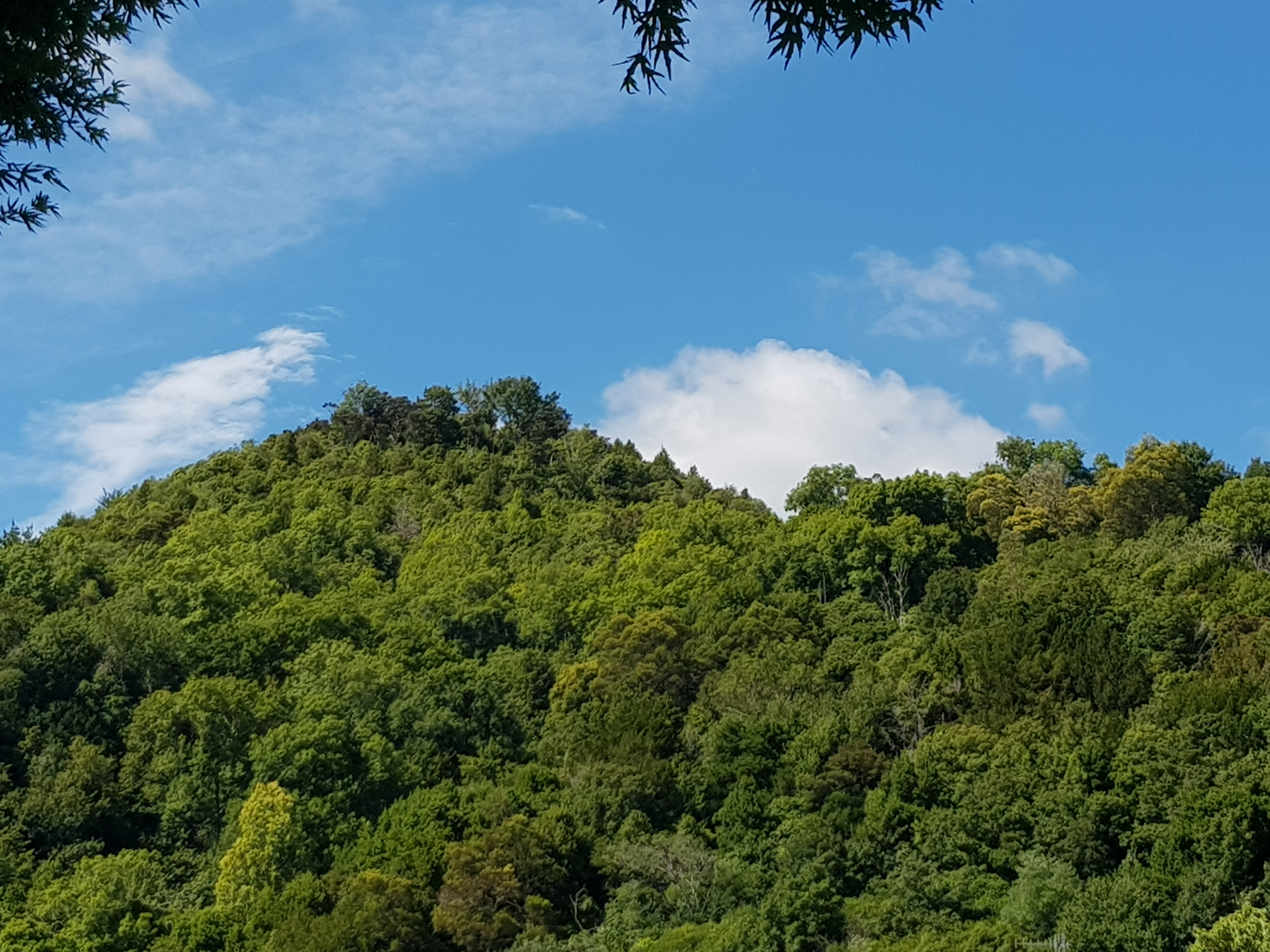
A hill in Nelson, the type locality of this species.

This species is endemic to New Zealand. It is found in both the North and South Islands.

== Life history and behaviour ==
The larvae are diurnal in their feeding habits. Prior to pupation the larva will retract its head and move the anterior segments of its body in a humping action. The pupa is formed by the larva after it attaches itself to a leaf or twig with a silk pad, hanging head down. The pupa is peculiarly shaped and can come in two colour shades, either a yellowish, green or a darkish brown. Hudson hypothesised that this species has two broods a year. The adults of this species have been observed on the wing all year round but is more commonly seen in late summer and autumn.

== Hosts ==
The larval host plants of this species include Veronica stricta, Veronica salicifolia, Veronica elliptica, Veronica macrocarpa and Veronica speciosa. The larvae of A. falcatalis make mines in leaves of large leaved species of Veronica and also tunnel into centre of the buds of these plants.

== Predators ==
Research undertaken prior to the introduction of Trigonospila brevifacies into New Zealand as a bio control, indicated that this species of fly uses A. falcatalis as a larval host.
