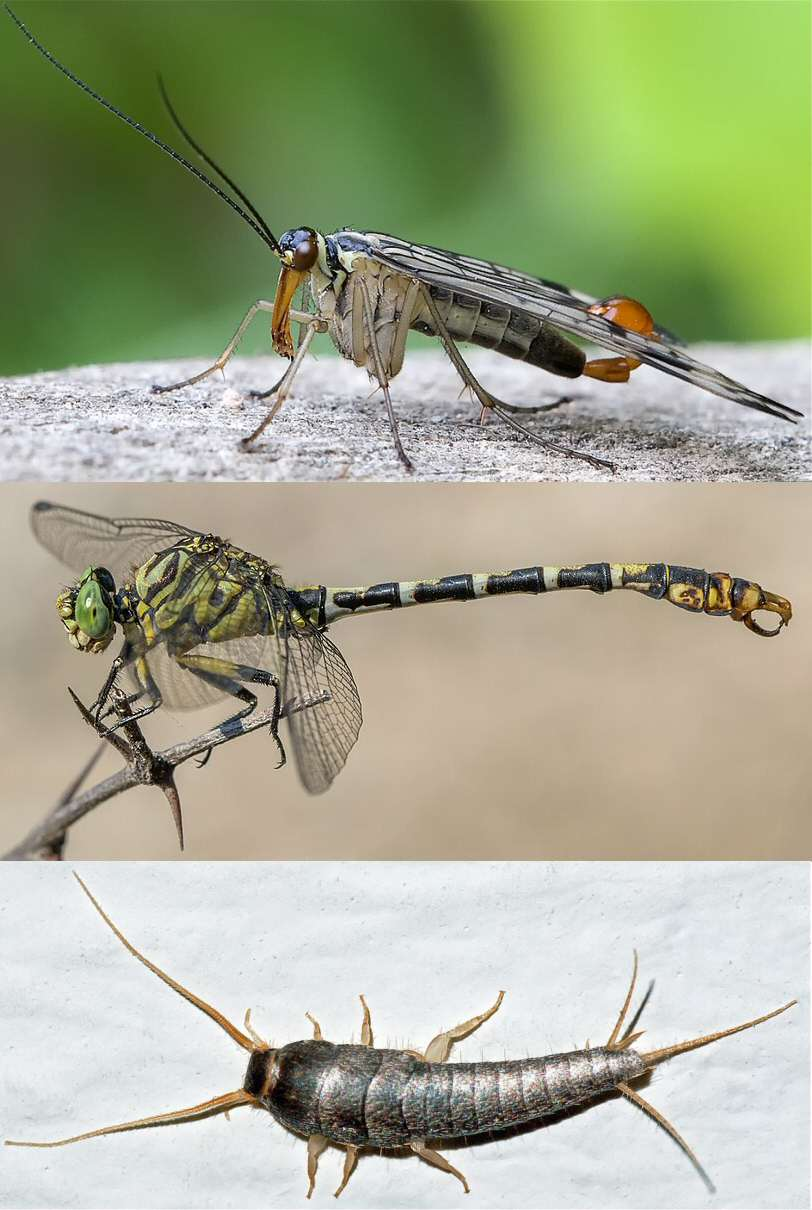
- Insects have a three-part body: a head with large compound eyes and antennae, a thorax with three pairs of legs, and a segmented abdomen. Many groups also have two pairs of wings.

Scientific classification
- Kingdom: Animalia
- Phylum: Arthropoda
- Clade: Pancrustacea
- Clade: Allotriocarida
- Subphylum: Hexapoda
- Class: Insecta; Linnaeus (1758)

Subgroups
- Archaeognatha; Dicondylia; Zygentoma; Pterygota

Synonyms
- Ectognatha; Entomida

= Insect =

Insect Temporal range: Carboniferous–Present Stem-group known from the Devonian

Class of arthropods

Insects live in a world of motion. This leaf-footed bug climbs windblown grass and flies off.

Insects (from Latin insectum) are invertebrates of the class Insecta. They are the largest group within the arthropod phylum. Insects have an exoskeleton, a three-part body (head, thorax and abdomen), three pairs of jointed legs, compound eyes, and a pair of antennae. Insects are the most diverse group of animals, with more than a million described species; they represent more than half of all animal species.

The insect nervous system consists of a brain and a ventral nerve cord. Insects breathe air through a system of paired openings along their sides, connected to small tubes that take air directly to the tissues. The blood therefore does not carry oxygen; it is only partly contained in vessels, and some circulates in an open hemocoel. Insect vision is mainly through their compound eyes, with additional small ocelli. Many insects can hear, using tympanal organs. Their sense of smell is via receptors, usually on the antennae and the mouthparts.

Most insects reproduce by laying eggs. Insect growth is constrained by the inelastic exoskeleton, so development involves a series of molts. The immature stages often differ from the adults in structure, habit, and habitat. Groups that undergo four-stage metamorphosis often have a nearly immobile pupa and those that undergo three-stage metamorphosis lack a pupa, developing through a series of increasingly adult-like nymphal stages. Adult insects typically move about by walking and flying; some can swim. Insects are the only invertebrates that can achieve sustained powered flight; insect flight evolved just once. Many insects are at least partly aquatic, and have larvae with gills; in some species, the adults too are aquatic. Some species, such as water striders, can walk on the surface of water. Insects are mostly solitary, but some, such as bees, ants and termites, are social and live in large, well-organized colonies. Others, such as earwigs, provide maternal care, guarding their eggs and young. Insects can communicate with each other in a variety of ways. Male moths can sense the pheromones of female moths over great distances. Other species communicate with sounds: crickets stridulate, or rub their wings together, to attract a mate and repel other males. Lampyrid beetles communicate with light.

Fossilized insects of enormous size have been found from the Paleozoic era, including giant dragonfly-like insects with wingspans of 55 to 70 cm (22 to 28 in). The most diverse insect groups appear to have coevolved with flowering plants. Humans regard many insects as pests, especially those that damage crops, and attempt to control them using insecticides and other techniques. Others are parasitic, and may act as vectors of diseases. Insect pollinators are essential to the reproduction of many flowering plants and so to their ecosystems. Many insects are ecologically beneficial as predators of pest insects, while a few provide direct economic benefit. Two species in particular are economically important and were domesticated many centuries ago: silkworms for silk and honey bees for honey. Insects are intentionally consumed as food in 80% of the world's nations, by people in roughly 3,000 ethnic groups. Human activities are having serious effects on insect biodiversity.

== Etymology ==
The word insect comes from the Latin word insectum from in + sĕco, "cut up", as insects appear to be cut into three parts. The Latin word was introduced by Pliny the Elder who calqued the Ancient Greek word ἔντομον éntomon "insect" (as in entomology) from ἔντομος éntomos "cut in pieces"; this was Aristotle's term for this class of life in his biology, also in reference to their notched bodies. The English word insect first appears in 1601 in Philemon Holland's translation of Pliny.

== Insects and other "bugs" ==
=== Distinguishing features ===
In common speech, insects and other terrestrial arthropods are often called bugs (Note: The Museum of New Zealand notes that "in everyday conversation", bug "refers to land arthropods with at least six legs, such as insects, spiders, and centipedes". In a chapter on "Bugs That Are Not Insects", entomologist Gilbert Walbauer specifies centipedes, millipedes, arachnids (spiders, daddy longlegs, scorpions, mites, chiggers and ticks) as well as the few terrestrial crustaceans (sowbugs and pillbugs).) or creepy crawlies. Entomologists to some extent reserve the name "bugs" for a narrow category of "true bugs", insects of the order Hemiptera, such as cicadas and shield bugs. Other terrestrial arthropods, such as centipedes, millipedes, woodlice, spiders, mites and scorpions, are sometimes confused with insects, since they have a jointed exoskeleton. Adult insects are the only arthropods that ever have wings, with up to two pairs on the thorax. Whether winged or not, adult insects can be distinguished by their three-part body plan, with head, thorax, and abdomen; they have three pairs of legs on the thorax.

Insects and other 'bugs' that could be confused with them

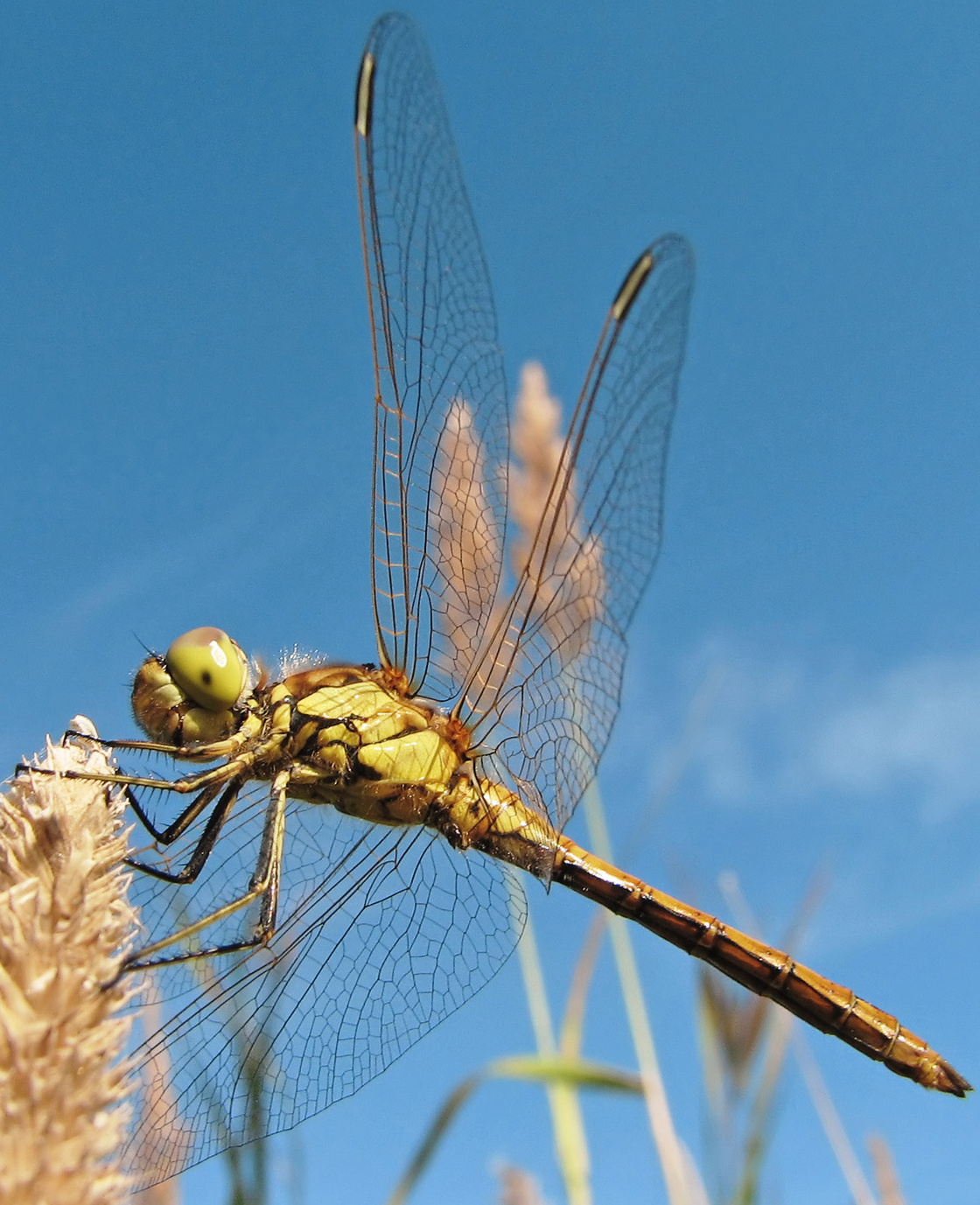
Insect: Six legs, three-part body
(head, thorax, abdomen),
up to two pairs of wings

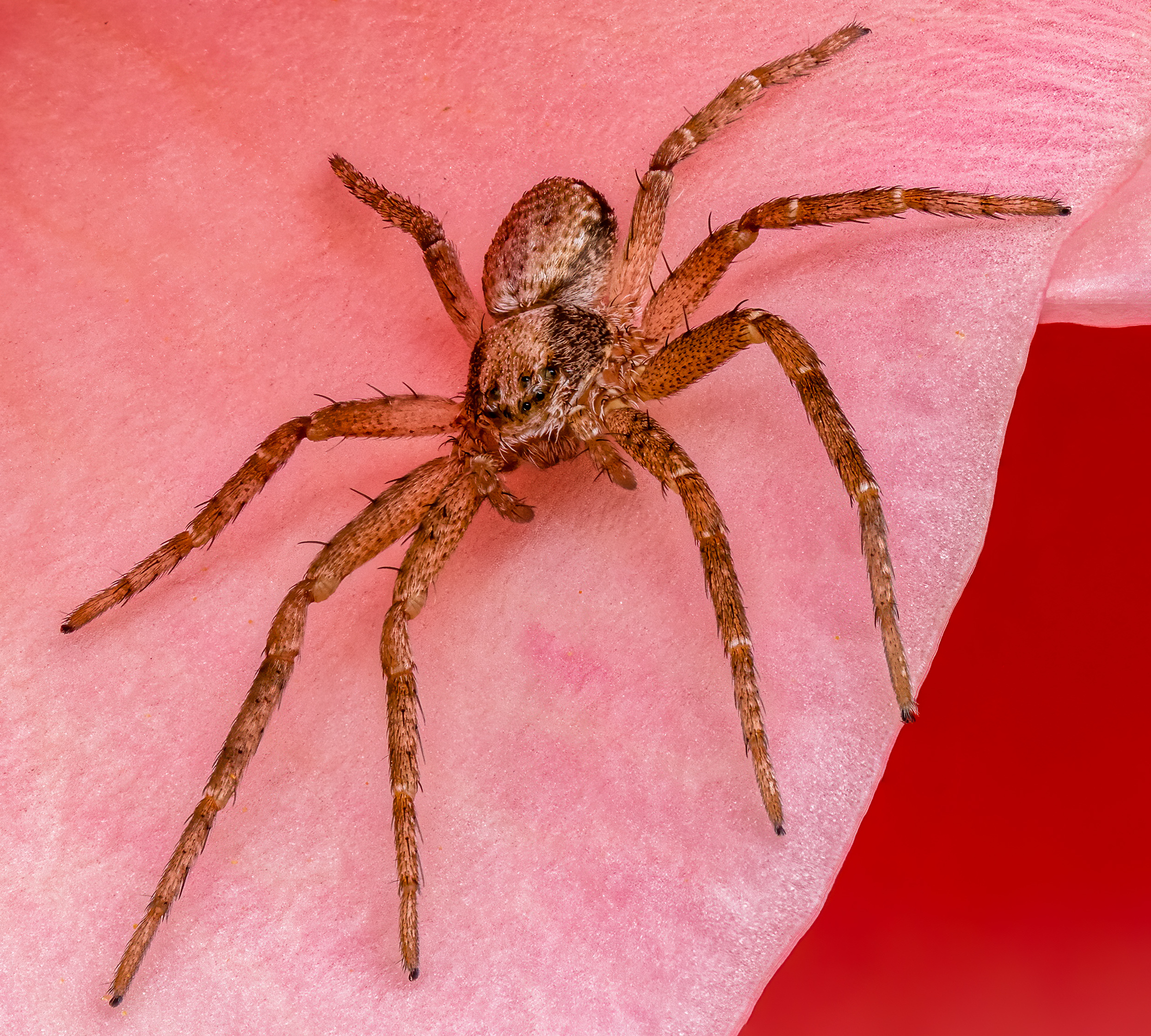
Spider: eight legs,
two-part body

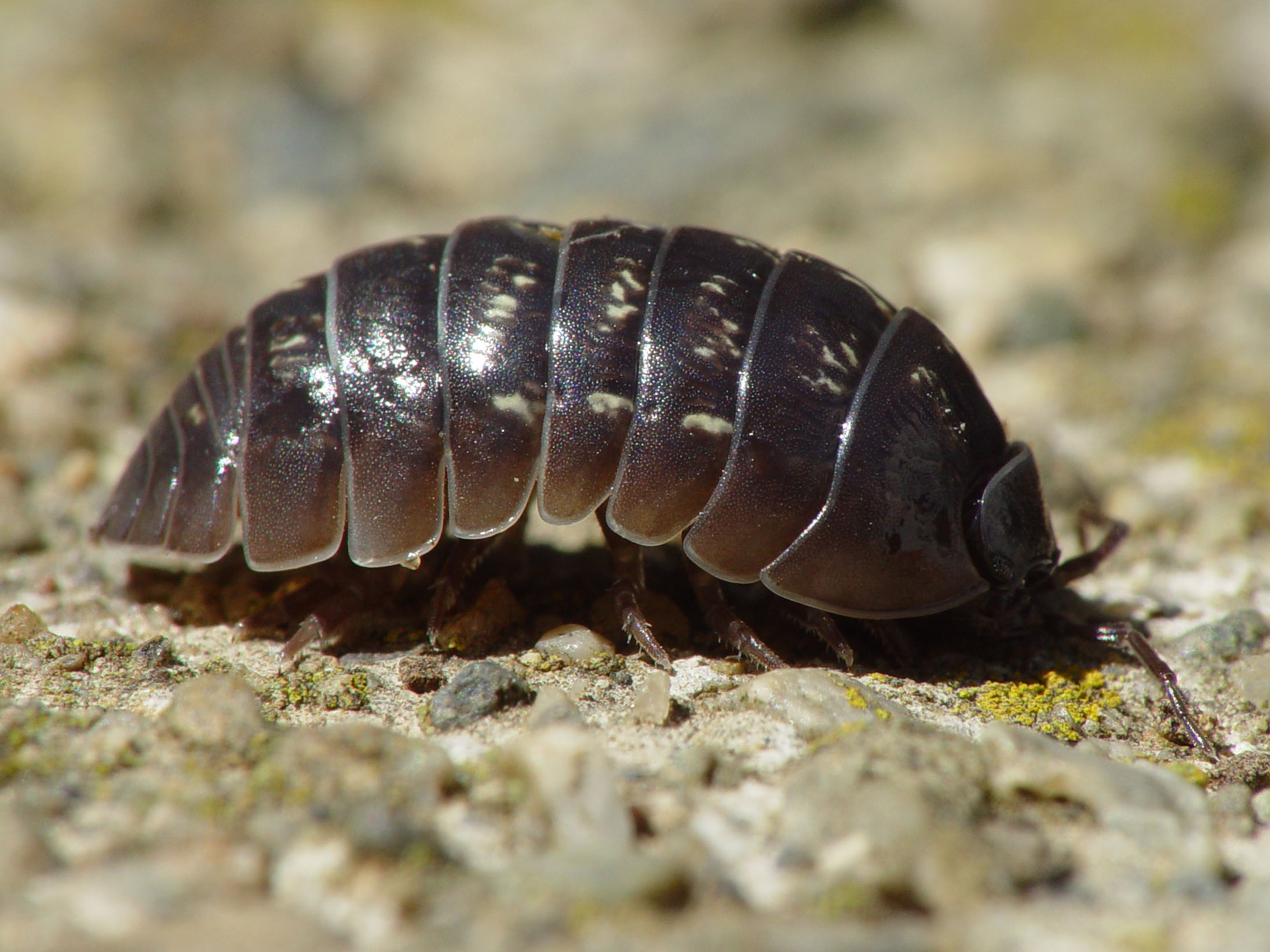
Woodlouse: seven pairs of legs, seven body segments (plus head and tail)

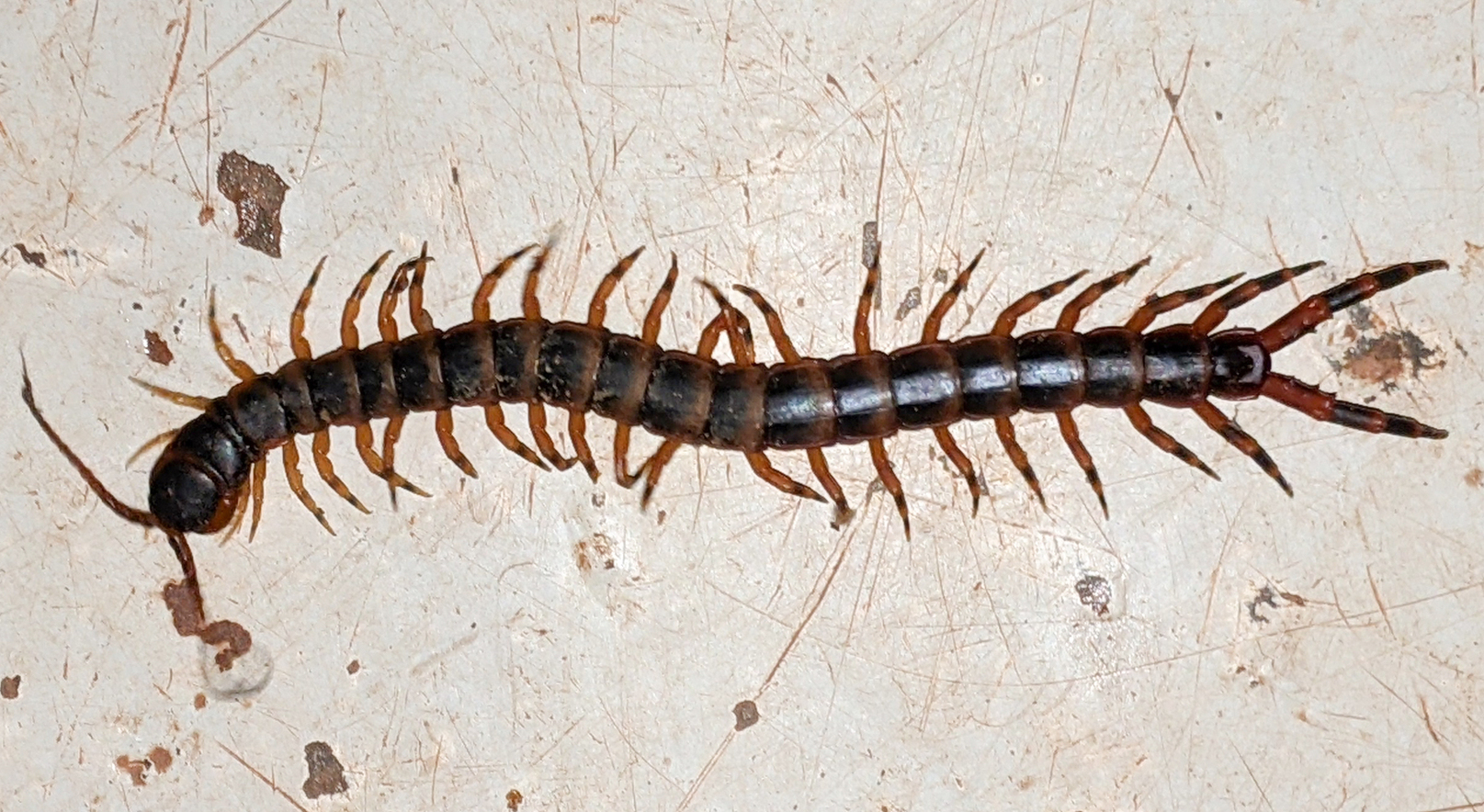
Centipede: many legs,
one pair per segment

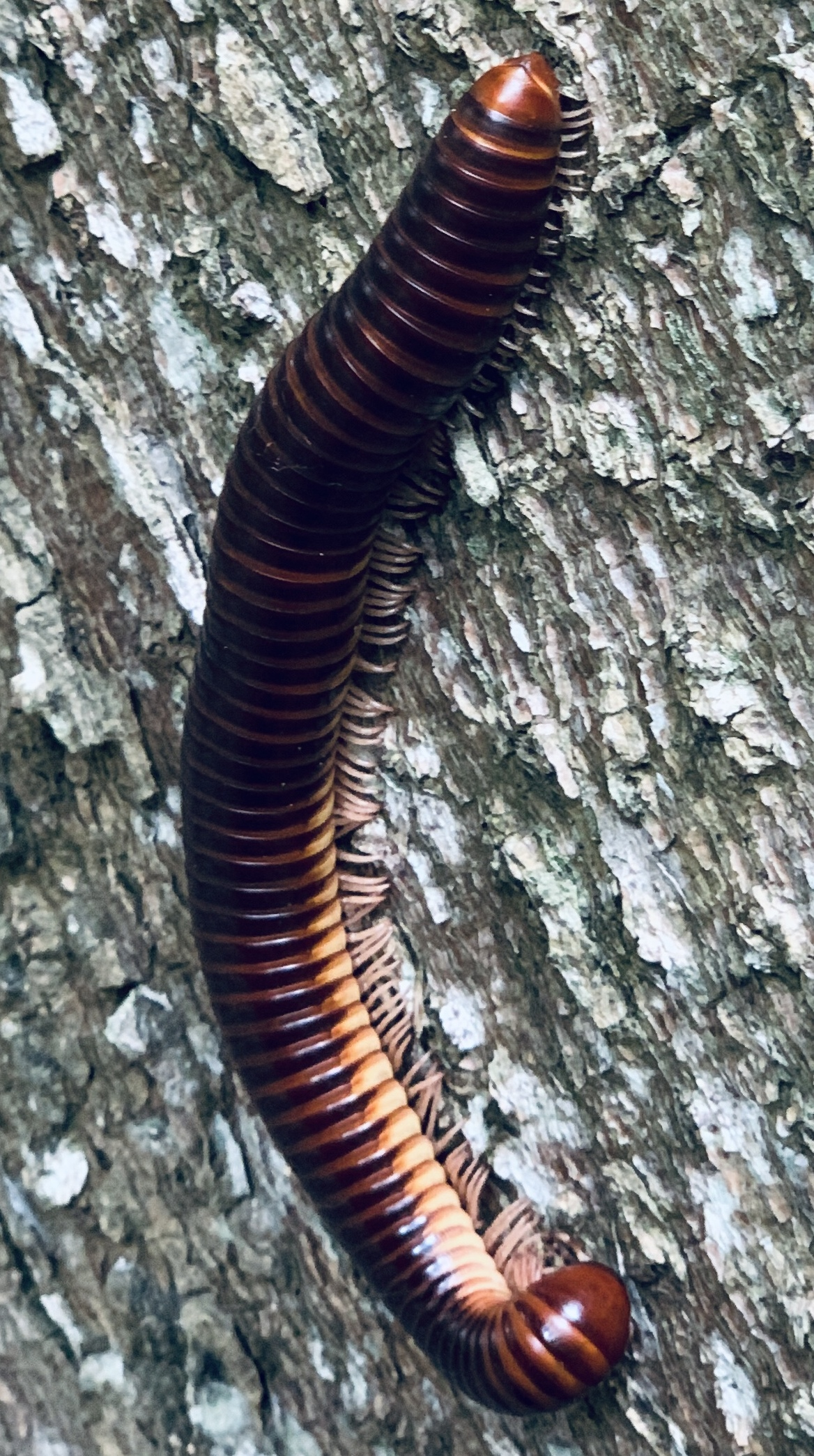
Millipede: many legs,
two pairs per segment

=== Diversity ===
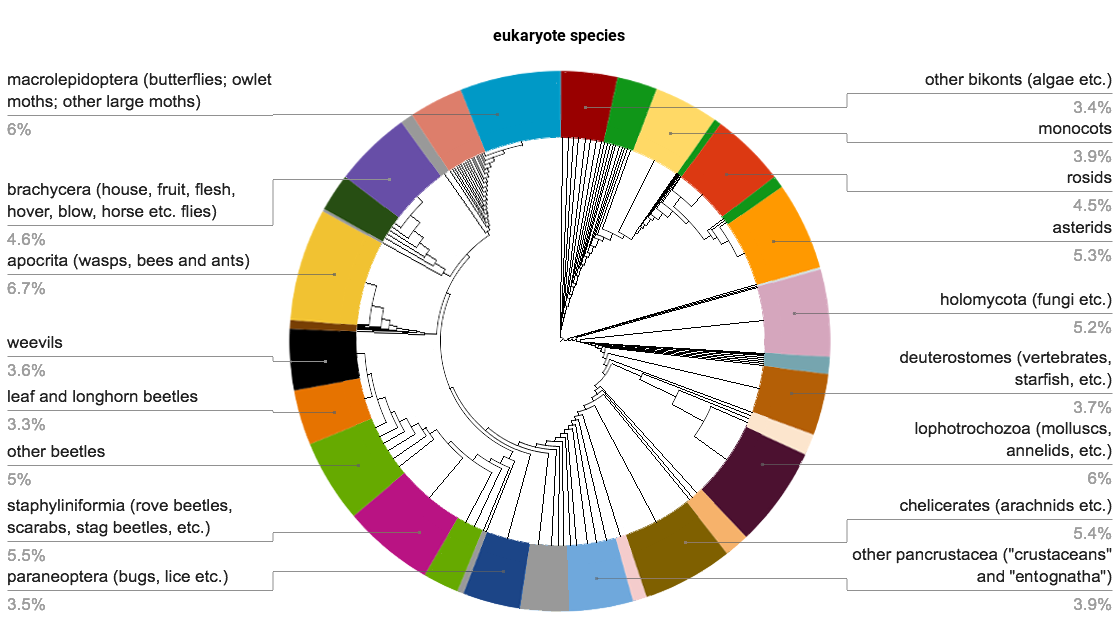
About half of all eukaryotes are insects (left side of diagram).

Estimates of the total number of insect species vary considerably, suggesting that there are perhaps some 5.5 million insect species in existence, of which about one million have been described and named. These constitute around half of all eukaryote species, including animals, plants, and fungi. The most diverse insect orders are the Hemiptera (true bugs), Lepidoptera (butterflies and moths), Diptera (true flies), Hymenoptera (wasps, ants, and bees), and Coleoptera (beetles), each with more than 100,000 described species.

Insects are extremely diverse. Five groups each have over 100,000 described species.

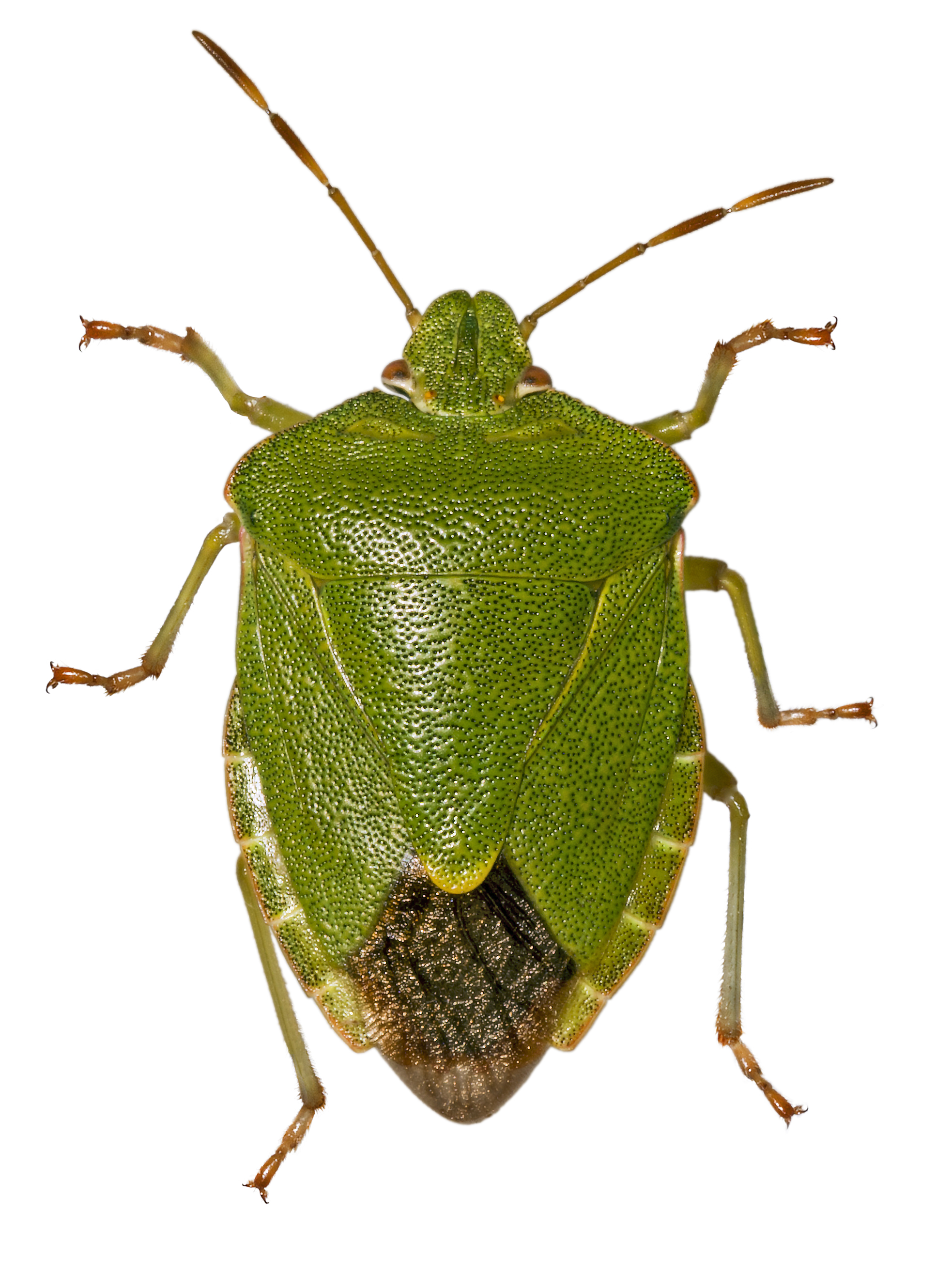
True bugs
(Hemiptera)

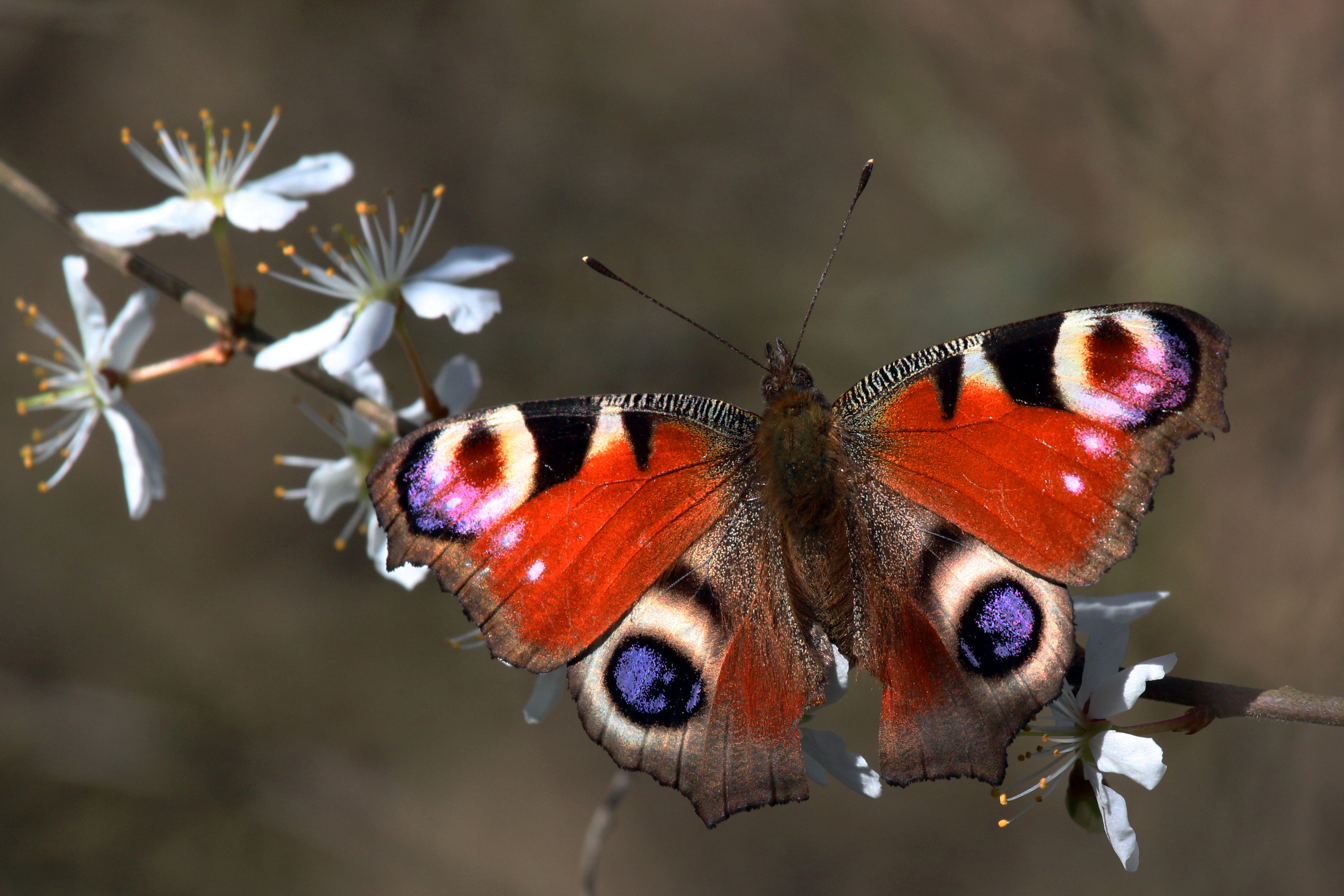
Butterflies and moths
(Lepidoptera)

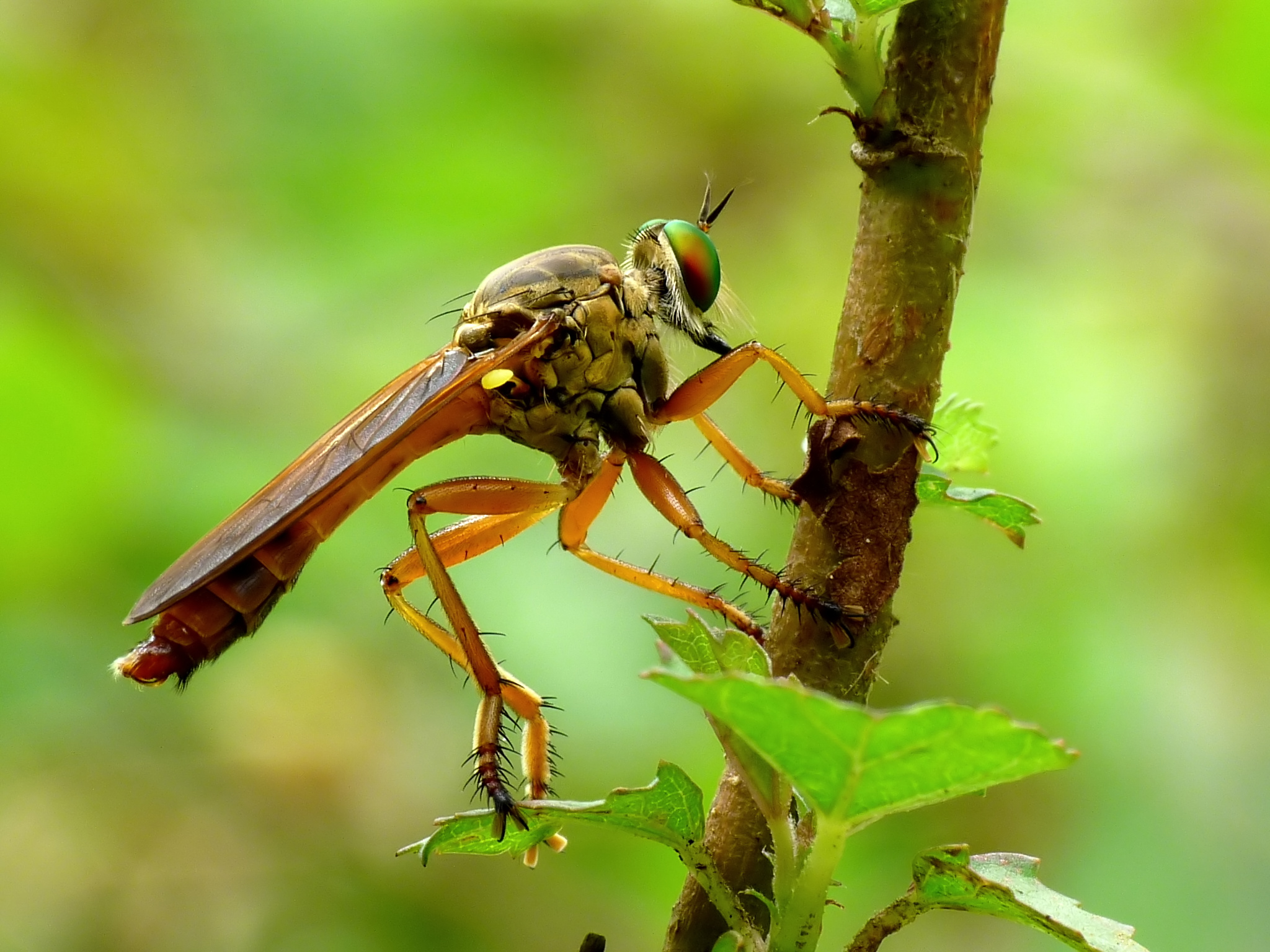
Flies
(Diptera)

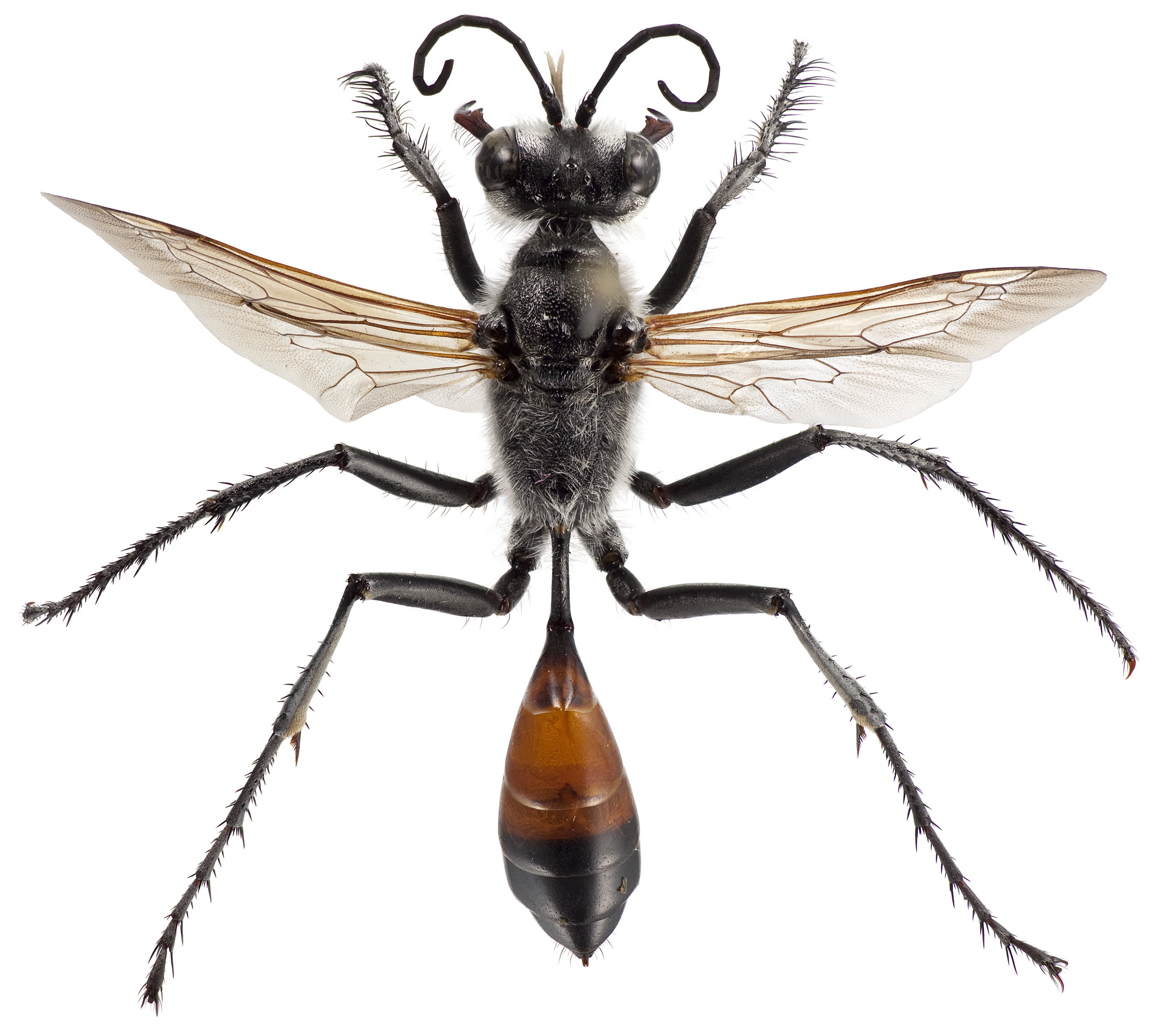
Wasps
(Hymenoptera)

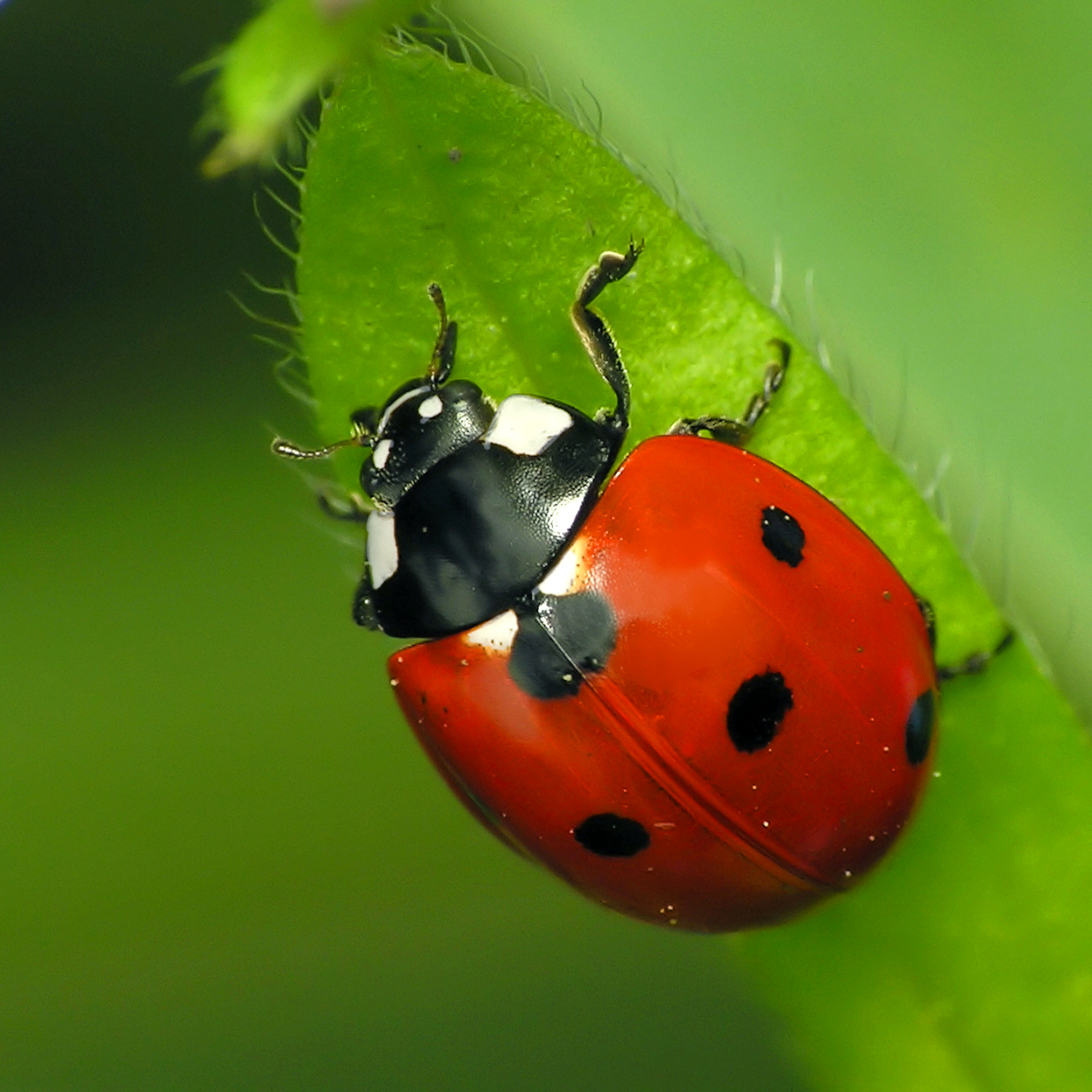
Beetles
(Coleoptera)

=== Distribution and habitats ===
Insects occur in habitats as varied as snow, freshwater, the tropics, desert, and even the sea.

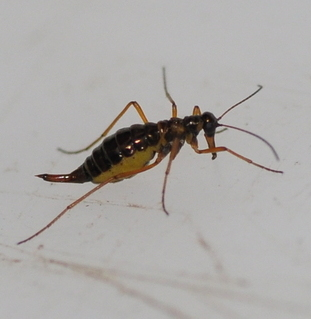
The snow scorpionfly Boreus hyemalis on snow

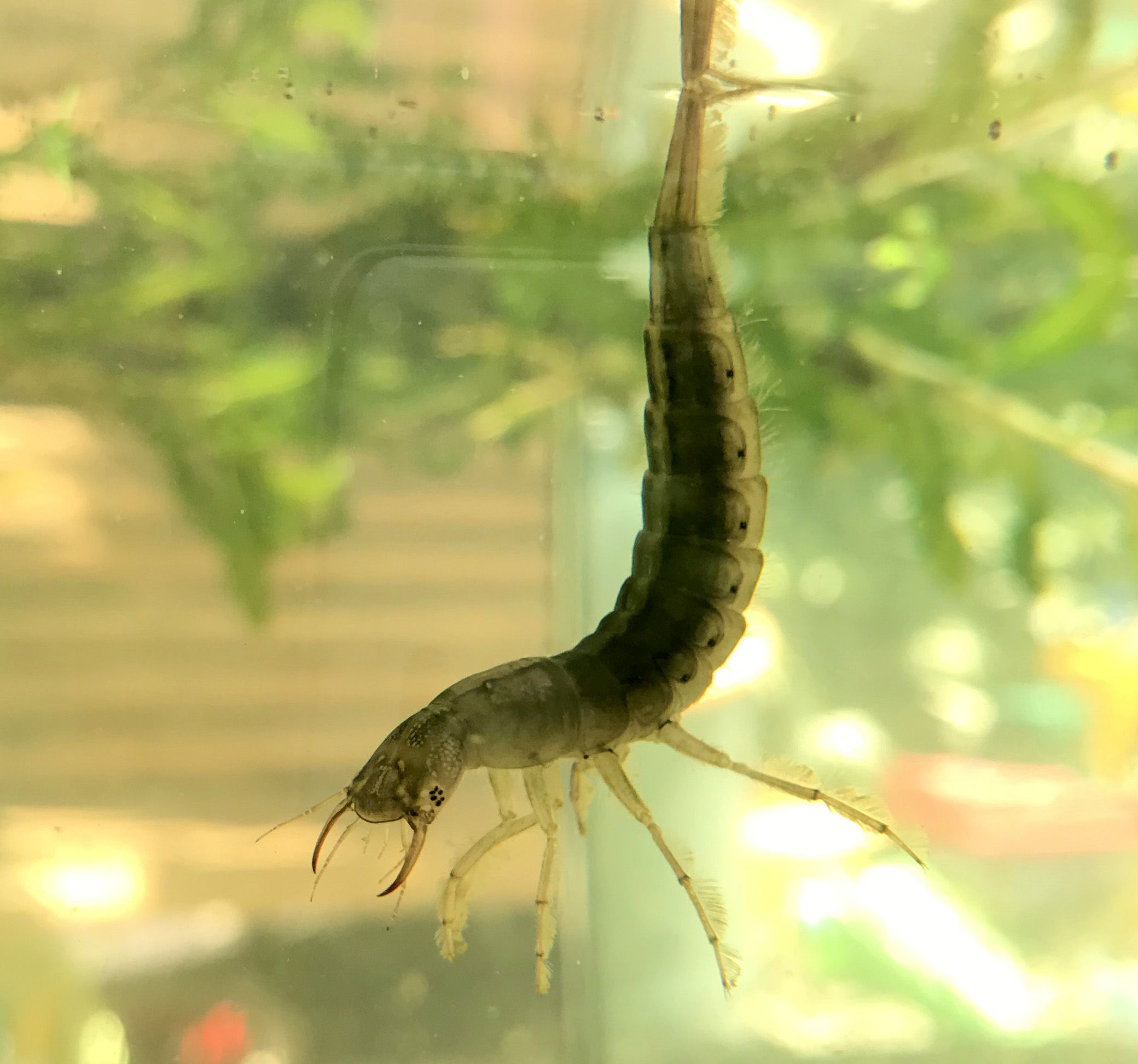
The great diving beetle Dytiscus marginalis larva in a pond

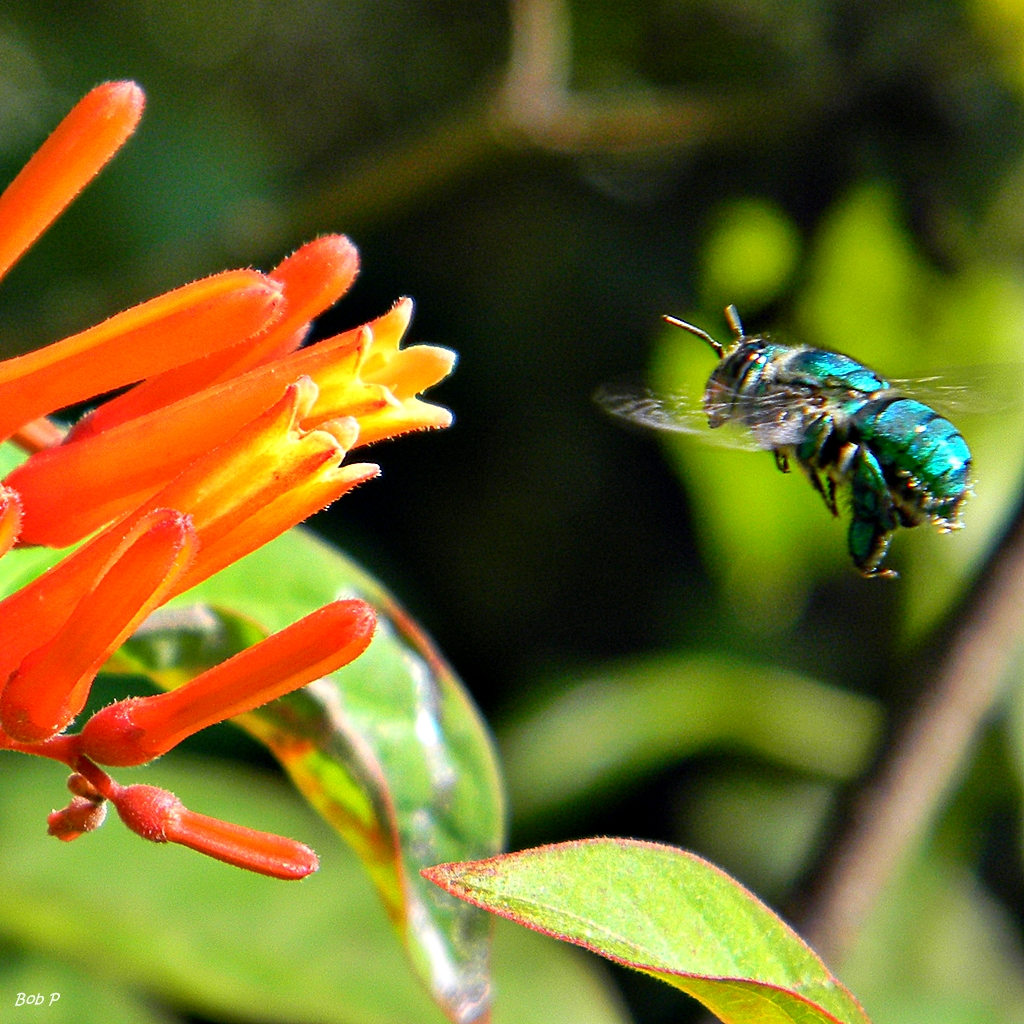
The green orchid bee Euglossa dilemma of Central America

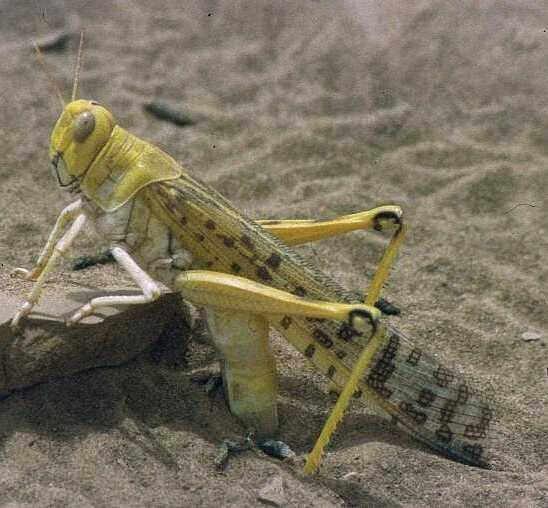
The desert locust Schistocerca gregaria laying eggs in sand

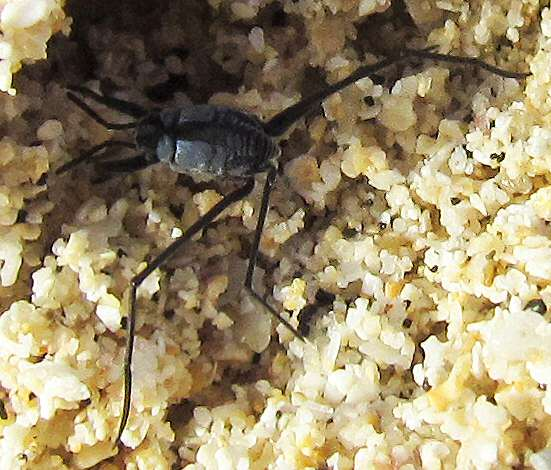
Sea skater Halobates on a Hawaii beach

Insects are distributed over every continent and almost every terrestrial habitat. There are many more species in the tropics, especially in rainforests, than in temperate zones. The world's regions have received widely differing amounts of attention from entomologists. The British Isles have been thoroughly surveyed, so that Gullan and Cranston 2014 state that the total of around 22,500 species is probably within 5% of the actual number there; they comment that Canada's list of 30,000 described species is surely over half of the actual total. They add that the 3,000 species of the American Arctic must be broadly accurate. In contrast, a large majority of the insect species of the tropics and the southern hemisphere are probably undescribed. Some 30–40,000 species inhabit freshwater; very few insects, perhaps a hundred species, are marine. Insects such as snow scorpionflies flourish in cold habitats including the Arctic and at high altitude. Insects such as desert locusts, ants, beetles, and termites are adapted to some of the hottest and driest environments on earth, such as the Sonoran Desert.

== Phylogeny and evolution ==
=== External phylogeny ===
Insects form a clade, a natural group with a common ancestor, among the arthropods. A phylogenetic analysis by Kjer et al. (2016) places the insects among the Hexapoda, six-legged animals with segmented bodies; their closest relatives are the Diplura (bristletails).

- Hexapoda
  - - Collembola (springtails)
    - Protura (coneheads)
  - - Diplura (two-pronged bristletails)
    - **Insecta** (=Ectognatha)

=== Internal phylogeny ===
The internal phylogeny is based on the works of Wipfler et al. 2019 for the Polyneoptera, Johnson et al. 2018 for the Paraneoptera, and Kjer et al. 2016 for the Holometabola. The numbers of described extant species (boldface for groups with over 100,000 species) are from Stork 2018.

- **Insecta**
  - Monocondylia
    Archaeognatha (hump-backed/jumping bristletails, 513 spp)
  - Dicondylia
    - Zygentoma (silverfish, firebrats, fishmoths, 560 spp)
    - Pterygota wings
      - Palaeoptera
        - Odonata (dragonflies and damselflies, 5,899 spp)
        - Ephemeroptera (mayflies, 3,240 spp)
      - Neoptera wings flex over abdomen
        - Polyneoptera
          - - Zoraptera (angel insects, 37 spp)
            - Dermaptera (earwigs, 1,978 spp)
          - - Plecoptera (stoneflies, 3,743 spp)
            - - Orthoptera (grasshoppers, crickets, katydids, 23,855 spp)
              - - - Notoptera
                    - Grylloblattodea (ice crawlers, 34 spp)
                    - Mantophasmatodea (gladiators, 15 spp)
                  - - Phasmatodea (stick insects, 3,014 spp)
                    - Embioptera (webspinners, 463 spp)
                - Dictyoptera
                  - Mantodea (mantises, 2,400 spp)
                  - Blattodea (cockroaches and termites, 7,314 spp)
        - Eumetabola
          - Paraneoptera
            - Psocodea (book lice, barklice and sucking lice, 11,000 spp)
            - Condylognatha
              - Hemiptera (true bugs, **103,590** spp)
              - Thysanoptera (thrips, 5,864 spp)
          - Holometabola larvae, pupae
            - Hymenoptera (sawflies, wasps, bees, ants, **116,861** spp)
            - Aparaglossata
              - Neuropteroidea
                - Coleopterida
                  - Strepsiptera (twisted-wing flies, 609 spp)
                  - Coleoptera (beetles, **386,500** spp)
                - Neuropterida
                  - Raphidioptera (snakeflies, 254 spp)
                  - - Neuroptera (lacewings, 5,868 spp)
                    - Megaloptera (alderflies and dobsonflies, 354 spp)
              - Panorpida
                - Amphiesmenoptera
                  - Lepidoptera (butterflies and moths, **157,338** spp)
                  - Trichoptera (caddisflies, 14,391 spp)
                - Antliophora
                  - Diptera (true flies, **155,477** spp)
                  - - Mecoptera (scorpionflies, 757 spp)
                    - Siphonaptera (fleas, 2,075 spp)

=== Taxonomy ===
==== Early ====
Diagram of Linnaeus's key to his seven orders of insect, 1758

- **Insecta**
  - Aptera wingless
  - winged
    - Diptera 2‑winged
    - 4‑winged
      - dissimilar pairs
        - Coleoptera forewings fully hardened
        - Hemiptera forewings partly hardened
      - similar pairs
        - Lepidoptera wings scaly
        - wings membranous
          - Neuroptera no sting
          - Hymenoptera sting

Aristotle was the first to describe the insects as a distinct group. He placed them as the second-lowest level of animals on his scala naturae, above the spontaneously generating sponges and worms, but below the hard-shelled marine snails. His classification remained in use for many centuries.

In 1758, in his Systema Naturae, Carl Linnaeus divided the animal kingdom into six classes including Insecta. He created seven orders of insect according to the structure of their wings. These were the wingless Aptera, the two-winged Diptera, and five four-winged orders: the Coleoptera with fully-hardened forewings; the Hemiptera with partly-hardened forewings; the Lepidoptera with scaly wings; the Neuroptera with membranous wings but no sting; and the Hymenoptera, with membranous wings and a sting.

Jean-Baptiste de Lamarck, in his 1809 Philosophie Zoologique, treated the insects as one of nine invertebrate phyla. In his 1817 Le Règne Animal, Georges Cuvier grouped all animals into four embranchements ("branches" with different body plans), one of which was the articulated animals, containing arthropods and annelids. This arrangement was followed by the embryologist Karl Ernst von Baer in 1828, the zoologist Louis Agassiz in 1857, and the comparative anatomist Richard Owen in 1860. In 1874, Ernst Haeckel divided the animal kingdom into two subkingdoms, one of which was Metazoa for the multicellular animals. It had five phyla, including the articulates.

==== Modern ====
Traditional morphology-based systematics have usually given the Hexapoda the rank of superclass, and identified four groups within it: insects (Ectognatha), Collembola, Protura, and Diplura, the latter three being grouped together as the Entognatha on the basis of internalized mouth parts.

The use of phylogenetic data has brought about numerous changes in relationships above the level of orders. Insects can be divided into two groups historically treated as subclasses: wingless insects or Apterygota, and winged insects or Pterygota. The Apterygota traditionally consisted of the primitively wingless orders Archaeognatha (jumping bristletails) and Zygentoma (silverfish). However, Apterygota is not monophyletic, as Archaeognatha are sister to all other insects, based on the arrangement of their mandibles, while the Pterygota, the winged insects, emerged from within the Dicondylia, alongside the Zygentoma.

The Pterygota (Palaeoptera and Neoptera) are winged and have hardened plates on the outside of their body segments; the Neoptera have muscles that allow their wings to fold flat over the abdomen. Neoptera can be divided into groups with incomplete metamorphosis (Polyneoptera and Paraneoptera) and those with complete metamorphosis (Holometabola). The molecular finding that the traditional louse orders Mallophaga and Anoplura are within Psocoptera has led to the new taxon Psocodea. Phasmatodea and Embiidina have been suggested to form the Eukinolabia. Mantodea, Blattodea, and Isoptera form a monophyletic group, Dictyoptera. Fleas are now thought to be closely related to boreid mecopterans.

=== Evolutionary history ===
The oldest fossil that may be a primitive wingless insect is Leverhulmia from the Windyfield chert, dating to the early Devonian, though it may be a stem-group insect rather than part of the crown group. The oldest known flying insects are from the mid-Carboniferous, around 328–324 million years ago. The group subsequently underwent a rapid explosive diversification. Claims that flying insects originated substantially earlier, during the Silurian or Devonian (some 400 million years ago) based on molecular clock estimates, are unlikely to be correct, given the fossil record.

Four large-scale radiations of insects have occurred: beetles (from about 300 million years ago), flies (from about 250 million years ago), moths and wasps (both from about 150 million years ago).

The extremely successful Hymenoptera (wasps, bees, and ants) appeared some 200 million years ago in the Triassic Period, but achieved their wide diversity more recently in the Cenozoic era, which began 66 million years ago. Some highly successful insect groups evolved in conjunction with flowering plants, a powerful illustration of coevolution. Insects were among the earliest terrestrial herbivores and acted as major selection agents on plants. Plants evolved chemical defenses against this herbivory and the insects, in turn, evolved mechanisms to deal with plant toxins. Many insects make use of these toxins to protect themselves from their predators. Such insects often advertise their toxicity using warning colors.

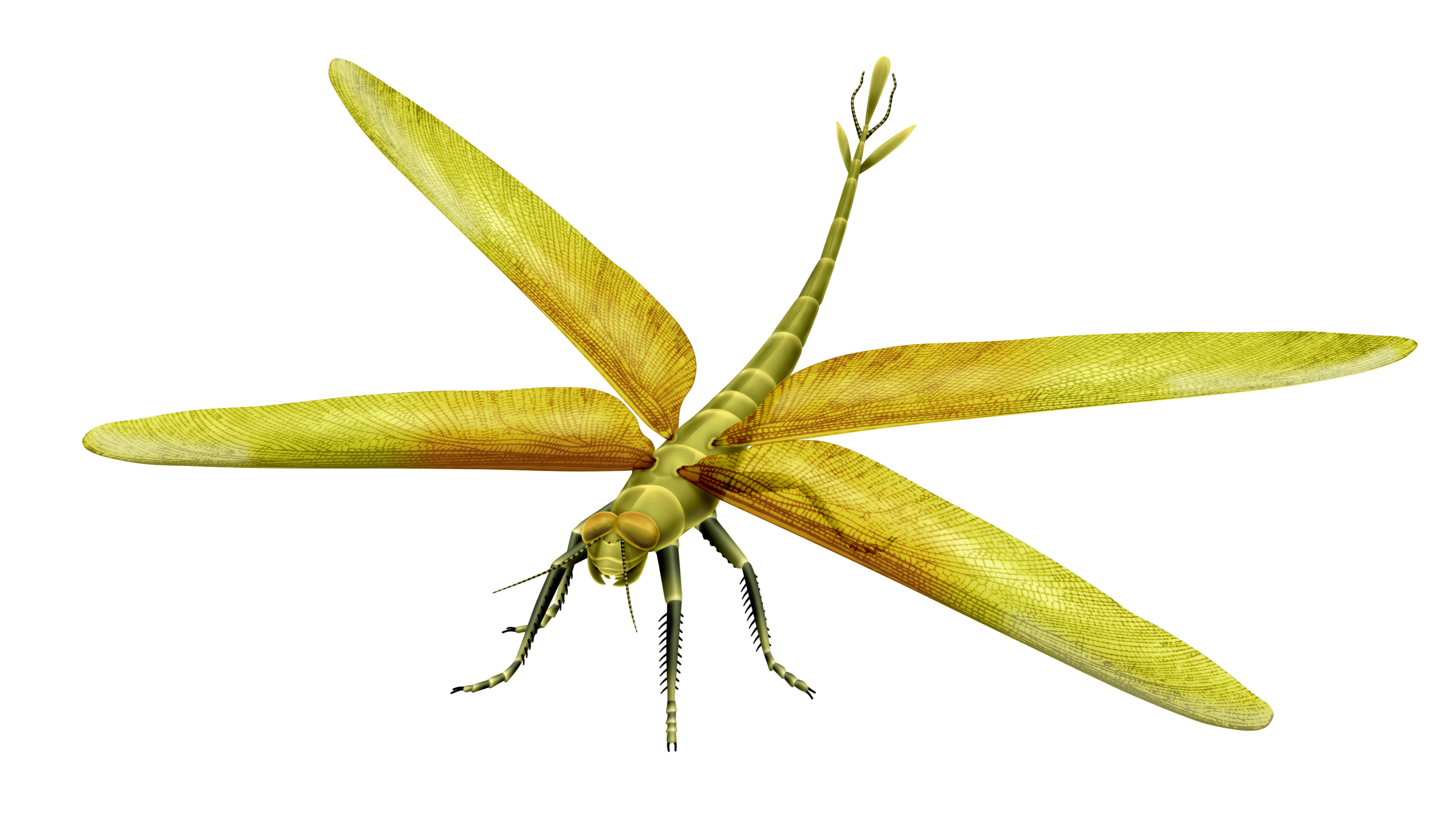
The giant dragonfly-like insect Meganeura monyi grew to wingspans of 75 cm (2 ft 6 in) in the late Carboniferous, around 300 million years ago.

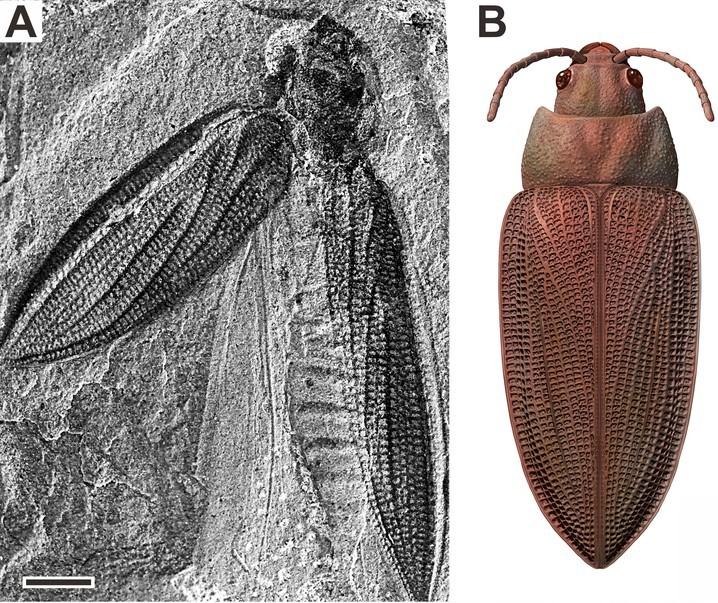
Beetle Moravocoleus permianus, fossil and reconstruction, from the Early Permian

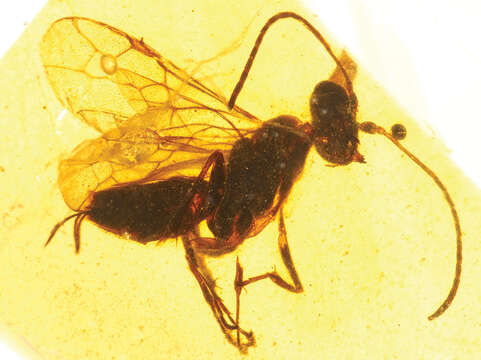
Hymenoptera such as this Iberomaimetsha from the Early Cretaceous, around 100 million years ago.

== Morphology and physiology ==
=== External ===
Insect morphology A- Head B- Thorax C- Abdomen: 1. antenna; 2. ocellus (lower); 3. ocellus (upper); 4. compound eye; 5. brain (cerebral ganglia); 6. prothorax; 7. dorsal blood vessel; 8. tracheal tubes (trunk with spiracle); 9. mesothorax; 10. metathorax; 11. forewing; 12. hindwing; 13. midgut (stomach); 14. dorsal tube (heart); 15. ovary; 16. hindgut (intestine, rectum, anus); 17. anus; 18. oviduct; 19. nerve cord (abdominal ganglia); 20. Malpighian tubules; 21. tarsal pads; 22. claws; 23. tarsus; 24. tibia; 25. femur; 26. trochanter; 27. foregut (crop, gizzard); 28. thoracic ganglion; 29. coxa; 30. salivary gland; 31. subesophageal ganglion; 32. mouthparts

==== Three-part body ====
Insects have a segmented body supported by an exoskeleton, the hard outer covering made mostly of chitin. The body is organized into three interconnected units: the head, thorax and abdomen. The head supports a pair of sensory antennae, a pair of compound eyes, zero to three simple eyes (or ocelli) and three sets of variously modified appendages that form the mouthparts. The thorax carries the three pairs of legs and up to two pairs of wings. The abdomen contains most of the digestive, respiratory, excretory and reproductive structures.

==== Segmentation ====
The head is enclosed in a hard, heavily sclerotized, unsegmented head capsule, which contains most of the sensing organs, including the antennae, compound eyes, ocelli, and mouthparts. The thorax is composed of three sections named (from front to back) the prothorax, mesothorax and metathorax. The prothorax carries the first pair of legs. The mesothorax carries the second pair of legs and the front wings. The metathorax carries the third pair of legs and the hind wings. The abdomen is the largest part of the insect, typically with 11–12 segments, and is less strongly sclerotized than the head or thorax. Each segment of the abdomen has sclerotized upper and lower plates (the tergum and sternum), connected to adjacent sclerotized parts by membranes. Each segment carries a pair of spiracles.

==== Exoskeleton ====
The outer skeleton, the cuticle, is made up of two layers: the epicuticle, a thin and waxy water-resistant outer layer without chitin, and a lower layer, the thick chitinous procuticle. The procuticle has two layers: an outer exocuticle and an inner endocuticle. The tough and flexible endocuticle is built from numerous layers of fibrous chitin and proteins, criss-crossing each other in a sandwich pattern, while the exocuticle is rigid and sclerotized. As an adaptation to life on land, insects have an enzyme that uses atmospheric oxygen to harden their cuticle, unlike crustaceans which use heavy calcium compounds for the same purpose. This makes the insect exoskeleton a lightweight material.

=== Internal systems ===
==== Nervous ====
The nervous system of an insect consists of a brain and a ventral nerve cord. The head capsule is made up of six fused segments, each with either a pair of ganglia, or a cluster of nerve cells outside of the brain. The first three pairs of ganglia are fused into the brain, while the three following pairs are fused into a structure of three pairs of ganglia under the insect's esophagus, called the subesophageal ganglion. The thoracic segments have one ganglion on each side, connected into a pair per segment. This arrangement is also seen in the first eight segments of the abdomen. Many insects have fewer ganglia than this. Insects are capable of learning.

==== Digestive ====
An insect uses its digestive system to extract nutrients and other substances from the food it consumes. There is extensive variation among different orders, life stages, and even castes in the digestive system of insects. The gut runs lengthwise through the body. It has three sections, with paired salivary glands and salivary reservoirs. By moving its mouthparts the insect mixes its food with saliva. Some insects, like flies, expel digestive enzymes onto their food to break it down, but most insects digest their food in the gut. The foregut is lined with cuticule as protection from tough food. It includes the mouth, pharynx, and crop which stores food. Digestion starts in the mouth with enzymes in the saliva. Strong muscles in the pharynx pump fluid into the mouth, lubricating the food, and enabling certain insects to feed on blood or from the xylem and phloem transport vessels of plants. Once food leaves the crop, it passes to the midgut, where the majority of digestion takes place. Microscopic projections, microvilli, increase the surface area of the wall to absorb nutrients. In the hindgut, undigested food particles are joined by uric acid to form fecal pellets; most of the water is absorbed, leaving a dry pellet to be eliminated. Insects may have one to hundreds of Malpighian tubules. These remove nitrogenous wastes from the hemolymph of the insect and regulate osmotic balance. Wastes and solutes are emptied directly into the alimentary canal, at the junction between the midgut and hindgut.

==== Reproductive ====
The reproductive system of female insects consist of a pair of ovaries, accessory glands, one or more spermathecae to store sperm, and ducts connecting these parts. The ovaries are made up of a variable number of egg tubes, ovarioles. Female insects make eggs, receive and store sperm, manipulate sperm from different males, and lay eggs. Accessory glands produce substances to maintain sperm and to protect the eggs. They can produce glue and protective substances for coating eggs, or tough coverings for a batch of eggs called oothecae.

For males, the reproductive system consists of one or two testes, suspended in the body cavity by tracheae. The testes contain sperm tubes or follicles in a membranous sac. These connect to a duct that leads to the outside. The terminal portion of the duct may be sclerotized to form the intromittent organ, the aedeagus.

==== Respiratory ====
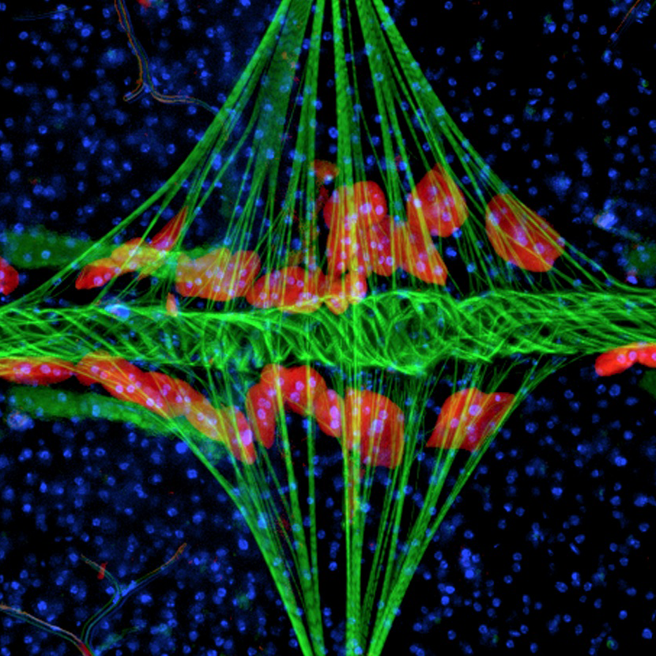
The tube-like heart (green) of the mosquito Anopheles gambiae extends horizontally across the body, interlinked with the diamond-shaped wing muscles (also green) and surrounded by pericardial cells (red). Blue depicts cell nuclei.

Insect respiration is accomplished without lungs. Instead, insects have a system of internal tubes and sacs through which gases either diffuse or are actively pumped, delivering oxygen directly to tissues that need it via their tracheae and tracheoles. In most insects, air is taken in through paired spiracles, openings on the sides of the abdomen and thorax. The respiratory system limits the size of insects. As insects get larger, gas exchange via spiracles becomes less efficient, and thus the heaviest insect currently weighs less than 100 g. However, with increased atmospheric oxygen levels, as were present in the late Paleozoic, larger insects were possible, such as dragonflies with wingspans of more than two feet (60 cm). Gas exchange patterns in insects range from continuous and diffusive ventilation, to discontinuous.

==== Circulatory ====
Because oxygen is delivered directly to tissues via tracheoles, the circulatory system is not used to carry oxygen, and is therefore greatly reduced. The insect circulatory system is open; it has no veins or arteries, and instead consists of little more than a single, perforated dorsal tube that pulses peristaltically. This dorsal blood vessel is divided into two sections: the heart and aorta. The dorsal blood vessel circulates the hemolymph, arthropods' fluid analog of blood, from the rear of the body cavity forward. Hemolymph is composed of plasma in which hemocytes are suspended. Nutrients, hormones, wastes, and other substances are transported throughout the insect body in the hemolymph. Hemocytes include many types of cells that are important for immune responses, wound healing, and other functions. Hemolymph pressure may be increased by muscle contractions or by swallowing air into the digestive system to aid in molting.

==== Sensory ====
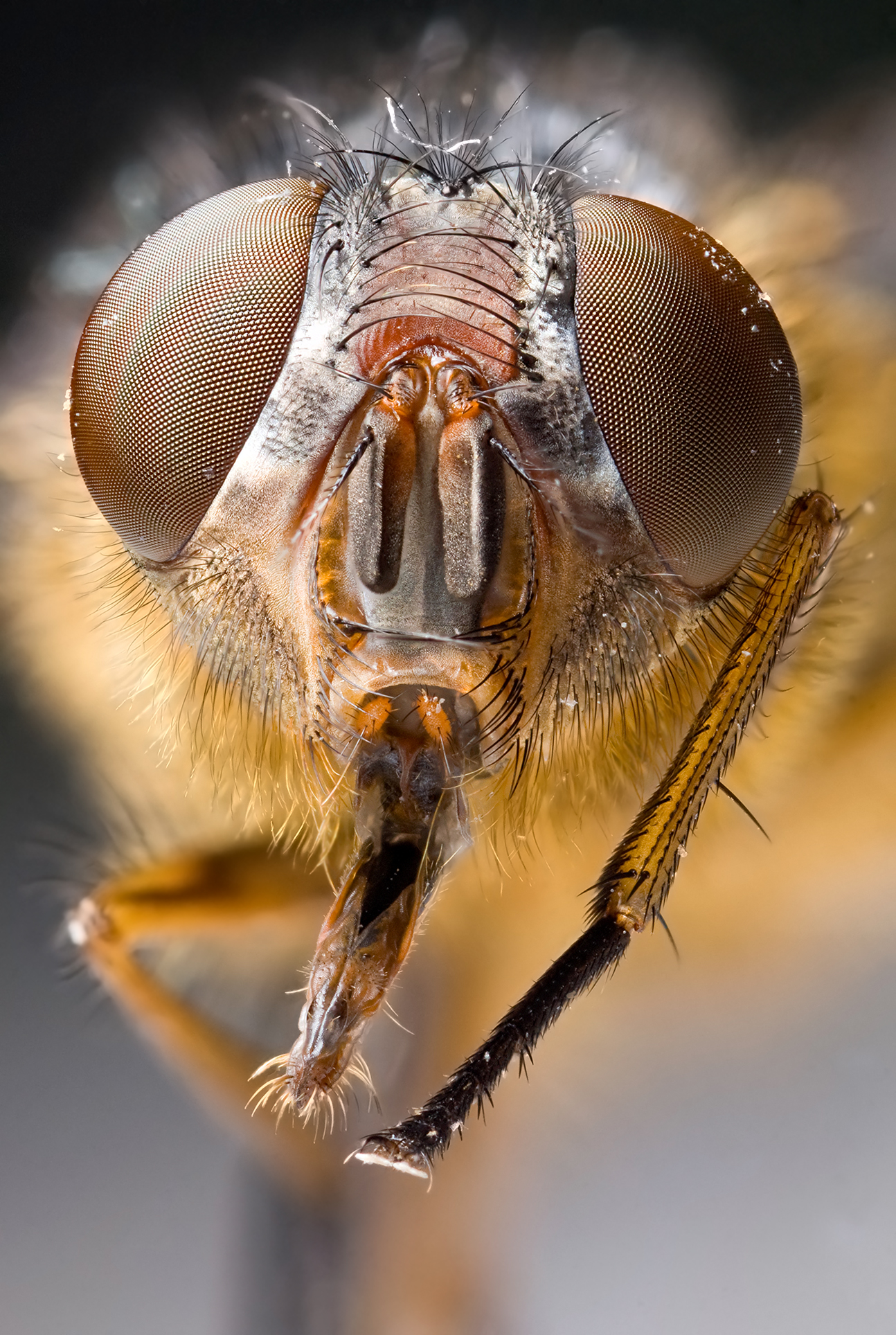
Most insects have a pair of large compound eyes and other sensory organs such as antennae able to detect movements and chemical stimuli on their heads.

Many insects possess numerous specialized sensory organs able to detect stimuli including limb position (proprioception) by campaniform sensilla, light, water, chemicals (senses of taste and smell), sound, and heat. Some insects such as bees can perceive ultraviolet wavelengths, or detect polarized light, while the antennae of male moths can detect the pheromones of female moths over distances of over a kilometer. There is a trade-off between visual acuity and chemical or tactile acuity, such that most insects with well-developed eyes have reduced or simple antennae, and vice versa. Insects perceive sound by different mechanisms, such as thin vibrating membranes (tympana). Insects were the earliest organisms to produce and sense sounds. Hearing has evolved independently at least 19 times in different insect groups.

Most insects, except some cave crickets, are able to perceive light and dark. Many have acute vision capable of detecting small and rapid movements. The eyes may include simple eyes or ocelli as well as larger compound eyes. Many species can detect light in the infrared, ultraviolet and visible light wavelengths, with color vision. Phylogenetic analysis suggests that UV-green-blue trichromacy existed from at least the Devonian Period, some 400 million years ago.

The individual lenses in compound eyes are immobile, but fruit flies have photoreceptor cells underneath each lens which move rapidly in and out of focus, in a series of movements called photoreceptor microsaccades. This gives them, and possibly many other insects, a much clearer image of the world than previously assumed.

An insect's sense of smell is via chemical receptors, usually on the antennae and the mouthparts. These detect both airborne volatile compounds and odorants on surfaces, including pheromones from other insects and compounds released by food plants. Insects use olfaction to locate mating partners, food, and places to lay eggs, and to avoid predators. It is thus an extremely important sense, enabling insects to discriminate between thousands of volatile compounds.

Some insects are capable of magnetoreception; ants and bees navigate using it both locally (near their nests) and when migrating. The Brazilian stingless bee detects magnetic fields using the hair-like sensilla on its antennae.

== Reproduction and development ==
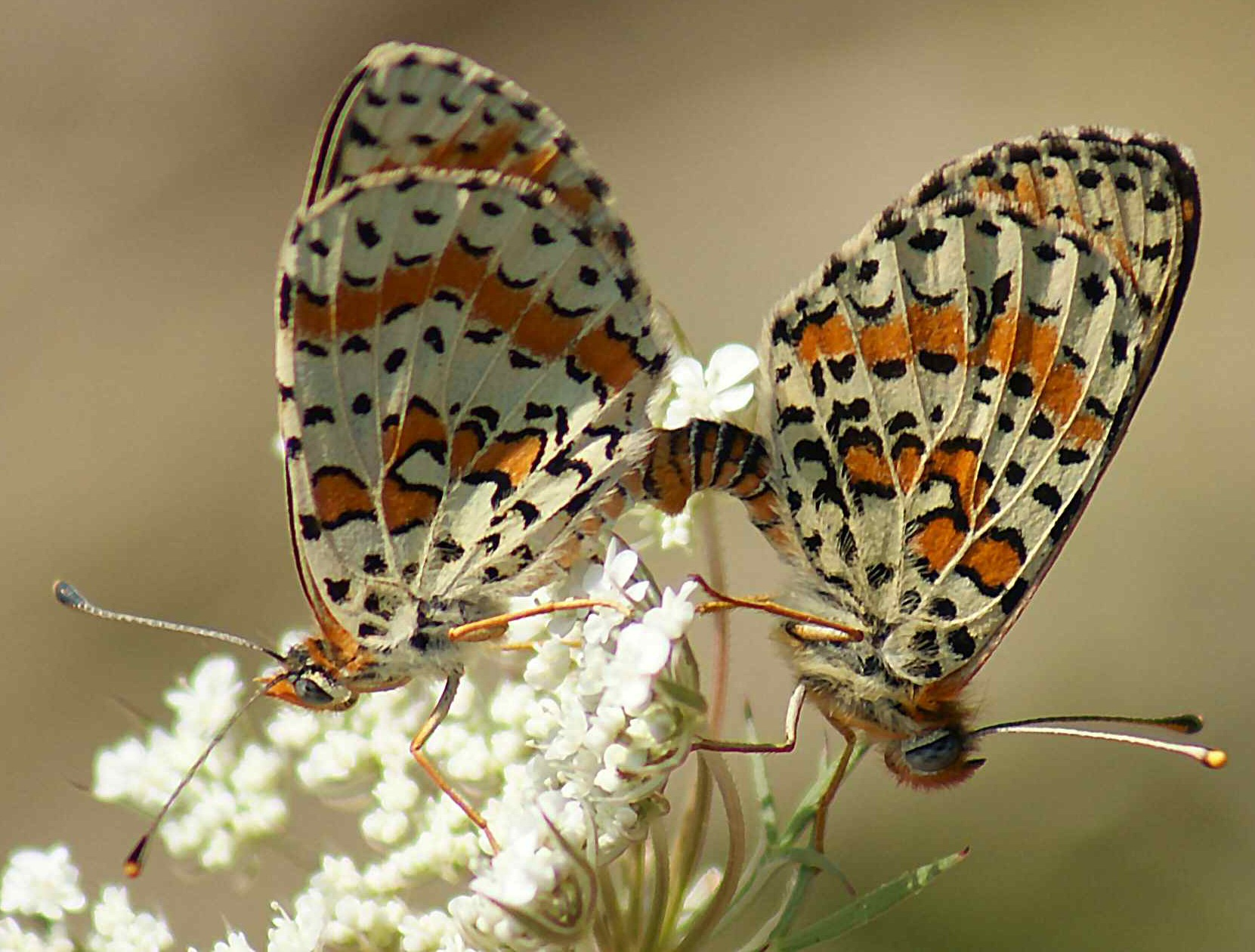
Butterflies mating

Male insects produce sperm, which is delivered to the female via the aedeagus. In some insects, such as bed bugs, the male can inject his sperm directly into the abdomen through the cuticle of the female, a process known as traumatic insemination. With the exception of parthenogenetic insects, insects are most often sexually dimorphic, with the males and females of most insects differing in appearance. Insects demonstrate a variety of strategies for locating mates, including the use of sex pheromones, mass swarming (referred to as leks), and nuptial gifts.

=== Life-cycles ===
The majority of insects hatch from eggs. The fertilization and development takes place inside the egg, which is usually drought resistant. Many insects lay their eggs in large masses, while others favor greater dispersion and lay single eggs in different locations. Some insects are parthenogenetic, meaning that the female can reproduce and give birth without having the eggs fertilized by a male. Many aphids alternate between generations of asexual and sexual reproduction.

Since most insects are poikilothermic, a rise in temperature will speed up the metabolism of an insect and consequently increase its rate of development. For this reason the development stage of an insect can be more accurately predicted when temperature over time is taken into account, rather than just the calendar age of the insect. Most insects develop in a year or less, exhibiting varying degrees of voltinism. Most insects in temperate climates do not develop continuously throughout the year, but slow or arrest their development during unfavorable times of the year. During seasonal extremes in summer (aestivation) or cold winters (hibernation) insects will enter diapause. Some insects will enter diapause every year regardless of conditions, where as others will only enter diapause during seasonal extremes.

=== Metamorphosis ===
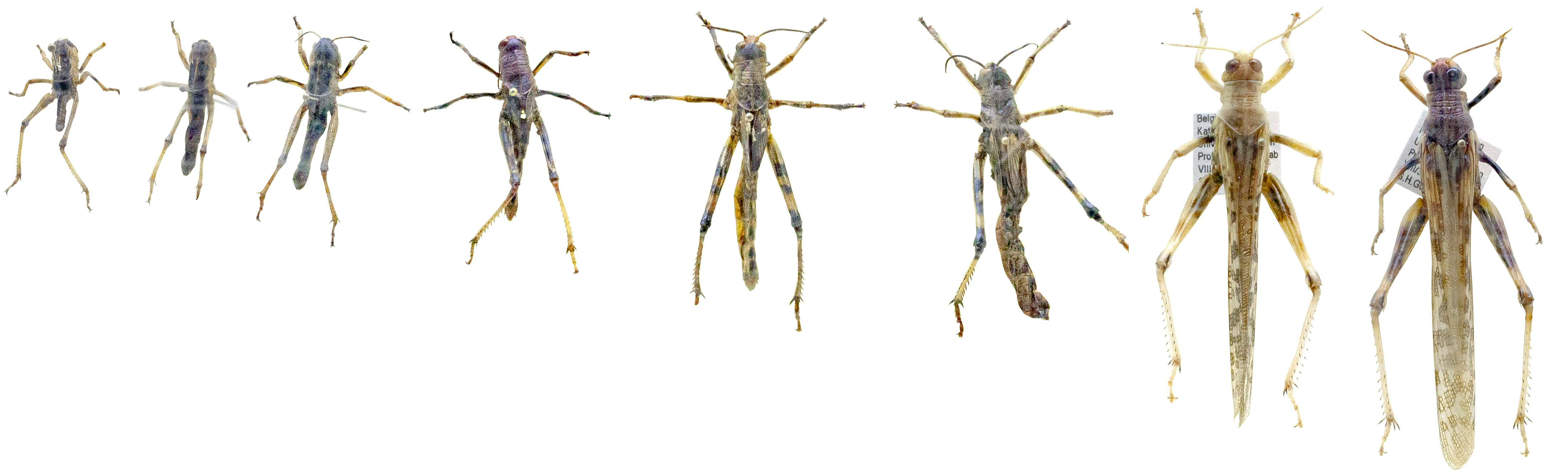
Incomplete metamorphosis in a locust with multiple instars. Egg is not shown. The largest specimen is adult.

Metamorphosis in insects is the process of development that converts young to adults. There are two forms of metamorphosis: incomplete (hemimetabolism) and complete (holometabolism).

Hemimetabolous insects, those with incomplete metamorphosis, change gradually after hatching from the egg by undergoing a series of molts through stages called instars, until the final, adult, stage is reached.

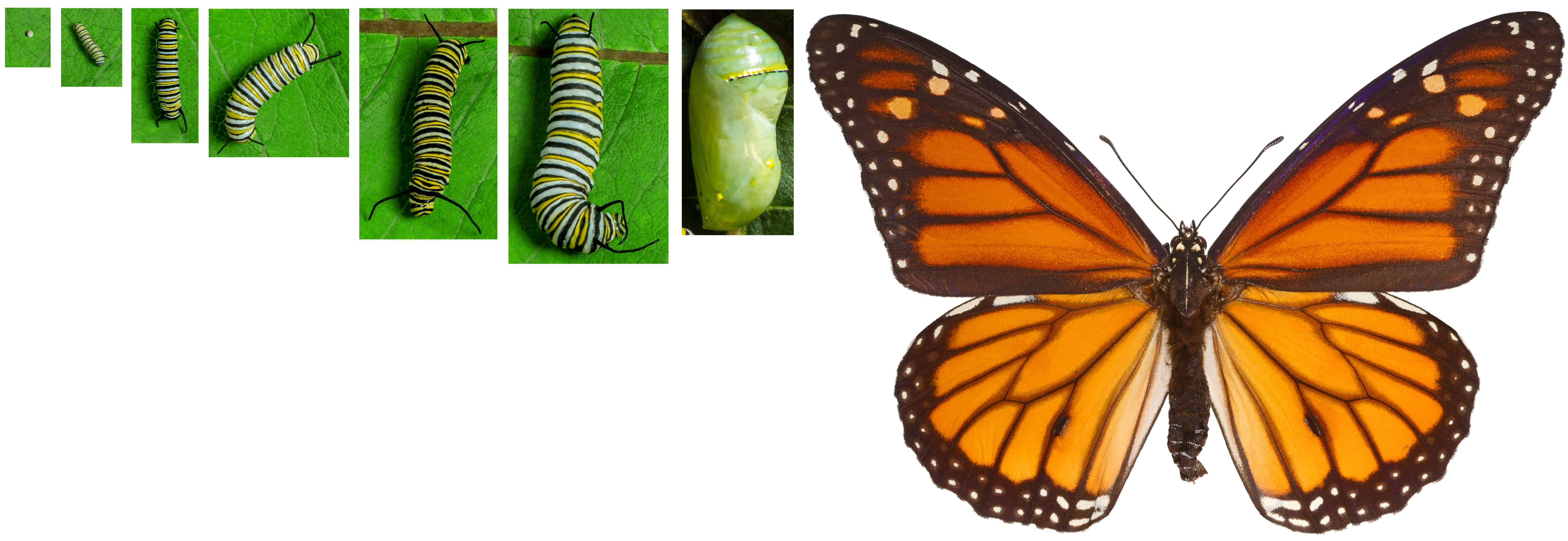
Life-cycle of butterfly, undergoing complete metamorphosis from egg through caterpillar larvae to pupa and adult

Holometabolism, or complete metamorphosis, is where the insect changes in four stages, an egg or embryo, a larva, a pupa and the adult or imago. In these species, an egg hatches to produce a worm-like larva. The larva grows and eventually becomes a pupa, a stage marked by reduced movement. Insects such as butterflies undergo considerable change in form during the pupal stage, and emerge as adults.

== Communication ==
Insects that produce sound can generally hear it. Most insects can hear only a narrow range of frequencies related to the frequency of the sounds they can produce. Mosquitoes can hear up to 2 kilohertz. Certain predatory and parasitic insects can detect the characteristic sounds made by their prey or hosts, respectively. Likewise, some nocturnal moths can perceive the ultrasonic emissions of bats, which helps them avoid predation.

=== Light production ===
A few insects, such as Mycetophilidae (Diptera) and the beetle families Lampyridae, Phengodidae, Elateridae and Staphylinidae are bioluminescent. The most familiar group are the fireflies, beetles of the family Lampyridae. Some species are able to control this light generation to produce flashes. The function varies with some species using them to attract mates, while others use them to lure prey. Cave dwelling larvae of Arachnocampa (Mycetophilidae, fungus gnats) glow to lure small flying insects into sticky strands of silk. Some fireflies of the genus Photuris mimic the flashing of female Photinus species to attract males of that species, which are then captured and devoured. The colors of emitted light vary from dull blue (Orfelia fultoni, Mycetophilidae) to the familiar greens and the rare reds (Phrixothrix tiemanni, Phengodidae).

=== Sound production ===
Insects make sounds mostly by mechanical action of appendages. In grasshoppers and crickets, this is achieved by stridulation. Cicadas make the loudest sounds among the insects by producing and amplifying sounds with special modifications to their body to form tymbals and associated musculature. The African cicada Brevisana brevis has been measured at 106.7 decibels at a distance of 50 cm (20 in). Some insects, such as the Helicoverpa zea moths, hawk moths and Hedylid butterflies, can hear ultrasound and take evasive action when they sense that they have been detected by bats. Some moths produce ultrasonic clicks that warn predatory bats of their unpalatability (acoustic aposematism), while some palatable moths have evolved to mimic these calls (acoustic Batesian mimicry). The claim that some moths can jam bat sonar has been revisited. Ultrasonic recording and high-speed infrared videography of bat-moth interactions suggest the palatable tiger moth really does defend against attacking big brown bats using ultrasonic clicks that jam bat sonar.

Grasshopper stridulation
Several unidentified grasshoppers stridulating

Very low sounds are produced in various species of Coleoptera, Hymenoptera, Lepidoptera, Mantodea and Neuroptera. These low sounds are produced by the insect's movement, amplified by stridulatory structures on the insect's muscles and joints; these sounds can be used to warn or communicate with other insects. Most sound-making insects also have tympanal organs that can perceive airborne sounds. Some hemipterans, such as the water boatmen, communicate via underwater sounds.

Cricket in garage with familiar call

Communication using surface-borne vibrational signals is more widespread among insects because of size constraints in producing air-borne sounds. Insects cannot effectively produce low-frequency sounds, and high-frequency sounds tend to disperse more in a dense environment (such as foliage), so insects living in such environments communicate primarily using substrate-borne vibrations.

Some species use vibrations for communicating, such as to attract mates as in the songs of the shield bug Nezara viridula. Vibrations can also be used to communicate between species; lycaenid caterpillars, which form a mutualistic association with ants communicate with ants in this way. The Madagascar hissing cockroach has the ability to press air through its spiracles to make a hissing noise as a sign of aggression; the death's-head hawkmoth makes a squeaking noise by forcing air out of their pharynx when agitated, which may also reduce aggressive worker honey bee behavior when the two are close.

=== Chemical communication ===
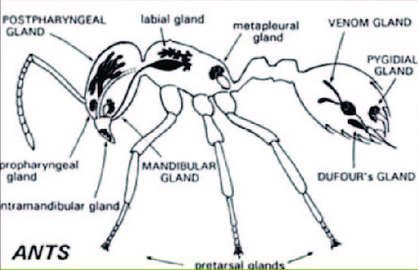
Social insects such as ants have multiple types of pheromonal glands, producing different semiochemicals for communication with other insects.

Many insects have evolved chemical means for communication. These semiochemicals are often derived from plant metabolites including those meant to attract, repel and provide other kinds of information. Pheromones are used for attracting mates of the opposite sex, for aggregating conspecific individuals of both sexes, for deterring other individuals from approaching, to mark a trail, and to trigger aggression in nearby individuals. Allomones benefit their producer by the effect they have upon the receiver. Kairomones benefit their receiver instead of their producer. Synomones benefit the producer and the receiver. While some chemicals are targeted at individuals of the same species, others are used for communication across species. The use of scents is especially well-developed in social insects. Cuticular hydrocarbons are nonstructural materials produced and secreted to the cuticle surface to fight desiccation and pathogens. They are important, too, as pheromones, especially in social insects.

== Social behavior ==
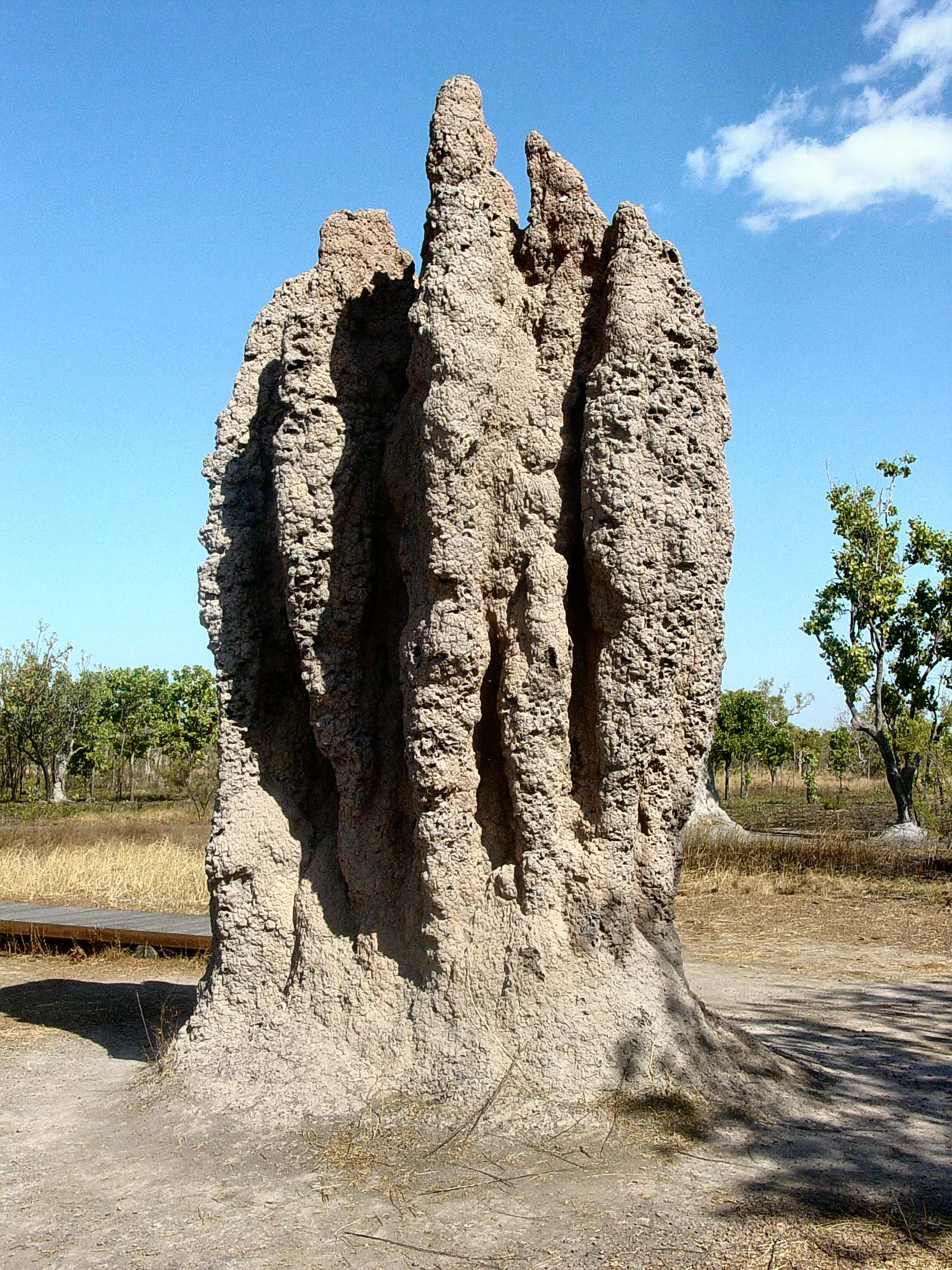
A cathedral mound created by mound-building termites.

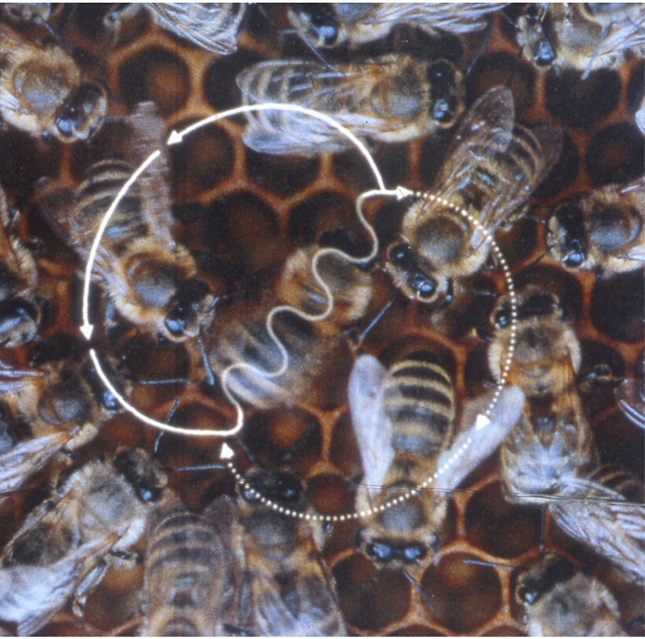
Honey bee's figure-eight waggle dance. An orientation 45° to the right of 'up' on the comb indicates food 45° to the right of the sun. The dancer's rapid waggling blurs her abdomen.

Social insects, such as termites, ants and many bees and wasps, are eusocial. They live together in such large well-organized colonies of genetically similar individuals that they are sometimes considered superorganisms. In particular, reproduction is largely limited to a queen caste; other females are workers, prevented from reproducing by worker policing. Honey bees have evolved a system of abstract symbolic communication where a behavior is used to represent and convey specific information about the environment. In this communication system, called dance language, the angle at which a bee dances represents a direction relative to the sun, and the length of the dance represents the distance to be flown. Bumblebees too have some social communication behaviors. Bombus terrestris, for example, more rapidly learns about visiting unfamiliar, yet rewarding flowers, when they can see a conspecific foraging on the same species.

Only insects that live in nests or colonies possess fine-scale spatial orientation. Some can navigate unerringly to a single hole a few millimeters in diameter among thousands of similar holes, after a trip of several kilometers. In philopatry, insects that hibernate are able to recall a specific location up to a year after last viewing the area of interest. A few insects seasonally migrate large distances between different geographic regions, as in the continent-wide monarch butterfly migration.

=== Care of young ===
Eusocial insects build nests, guard eggs, and provide food for offspring full-time. Most insects, however, lead short lives as adults, and rarely interact with one another except to mate or compete for mates. A small number provide parental care, where they at least guard their eggs, and sometimes guard their offspring until adulthood, possibly even feeding them. Many wasps and bees construct a nest or burrow, store provisions in it, and lay an egg upon those provisions, providing no further care.

== Locomotion ==
=== Flight ===
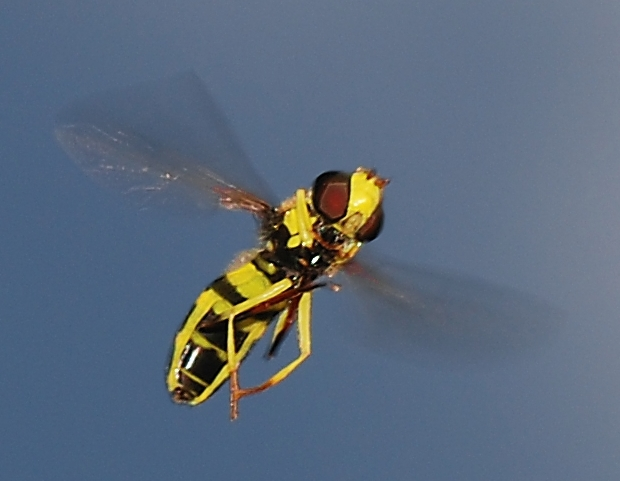
Insects such as hoverflies are capable of rapid and agile flight.

Insects are the only group of invertebrates to have developed flight. The ancient groups of insects in the Palaeoptera, the dragonflies, damselflies and mayflies, operate their wings directly by paired muscles attached to points on each wing base that raise and lower them. This can only be done at a relatively slow rate. All other insects, the Neoptera, have indirect flight, in which the flight muscles cause rapid oscillation of the thorax: there can be more wingbeats than nerve impulses commanding the muscles. One pair of flight muscles is aligned vertically, contracting to pull the top of the thorax down, and the wings up. The other pair runs longitudinally, contracting to force the top of the thorax up and the wings down. Most insects gain aerodynamic lift by creating a spiralling vortex at the leading edge of the wings. Small insects like thrips with tiny feathery wings gain lift using the clap and fling mechanism; the wings are clapped together and pulled apart, flinging vortices into the air at the leading edges and at the wingtips.

The evolution of insect wings has been a subject of debate; it has been suggested they came from modified gills, flaps on the spiracles, or an appendage, the epicoxa, at the base of the legs. More recently, entomologists have favored evolution of wings from lobes of the notum, of the pleuron, or more likely both. In the Carboniferous age, the dragonfly-like Meganeura had as much as a 50 cm (20 in) wide wingspan. The appearance of gigantic insects is consistent with high atmospheric oxygen at that time, as the respiratory system of insects constrains their size. The largest flying insects today are much smaller, with the largest wingspan belonging to the white witch moth (Thysania agrippina), at approximately 28 cm (11 in).

Unlike birds, small insects are swept along by the prevailing winds although many larger insects migrate. Aphids are transported long distances by low-level jet streams.

=== Walking ===
Spatial and temporal stepping pattern of walking desert ants performing an alternating tripod gait. Recording rate: 500 fps, Playback rate: 10 fps.

Many adult insects use six legs for walking, with an alternating tripod gait. This allows for rapid walking with a stable stance; it has been studied extensively in cockroaches and ants. For the first step, the middle right leg and the front and rear left legs are in contact with the ground and move the insect forward, while the front and rear right leg and the middle left leg are lifted and moved forward to a new position. When they touch the ground to form a new stable triangle, the other legs can be lifted and brought forward in turn. The purest form of the tripedal gait is seen in insects moving at high speeds. However, this type of locomotion is not rigid and insects can adapt a variety of gaits. For example, when moving slowly, turning, avoiding obstacles, climbing or slippery surfaces, four (tetrapodal) or more feet (wave-gait) may be touching the ground. Cockroaches are among the fastest insect runners and, at full speed, adopt a bipedal run. More sedate locomotion is seen in the well-camouflaged stick insects (Phasmatodea). A small number of species such as Water striders can move on the surface of water; their claws are recessed in a special groove, preventing the claws from piercing the water's surface film. The ocean-skaters in the genus Halobates even live on the surface of open oceans, a habitat that has few insect species.

=== Swimming ===
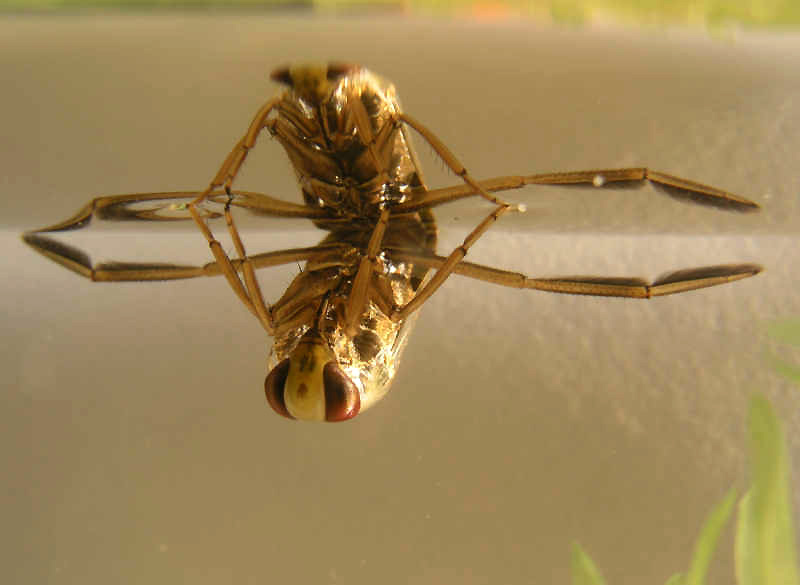
The backswimmer Notonecta glauca underwater, showing its paddle-like hindleg adaptation

A large number of insects live either part or the whole of their lives underwater. In many of the more primitive orders of insect, the immature stages are aquatic. In some groups, such as water beetles, the adults too are aquatic.

Many of these species are adapted for under-water locomotion. Water beetles and water bugs have legs adapted into paddle-like structures. Dragonfly naiads use jet propulsion, forcibly expelling water out of their rectal chamber. Other insects such as the rove beetle Stenus emit pygidial gland surfactant secretions that reduce surface tension; this enables them to move on the surface of water by Marangoni propulsion.

== Ecology ==
Insects play many critical roles in ecosystems, including soil turning and aeration, dung burial, pest control, pollination and wildlife nutrition. For instance, termites modify the environment around their nests, encouraging grass growth; many beetles are scavengers; dung beetles recycle biological materials into forms useful to other organisms. Insects are responsible for much of the process by which topsoil is created.

=== Defense ===
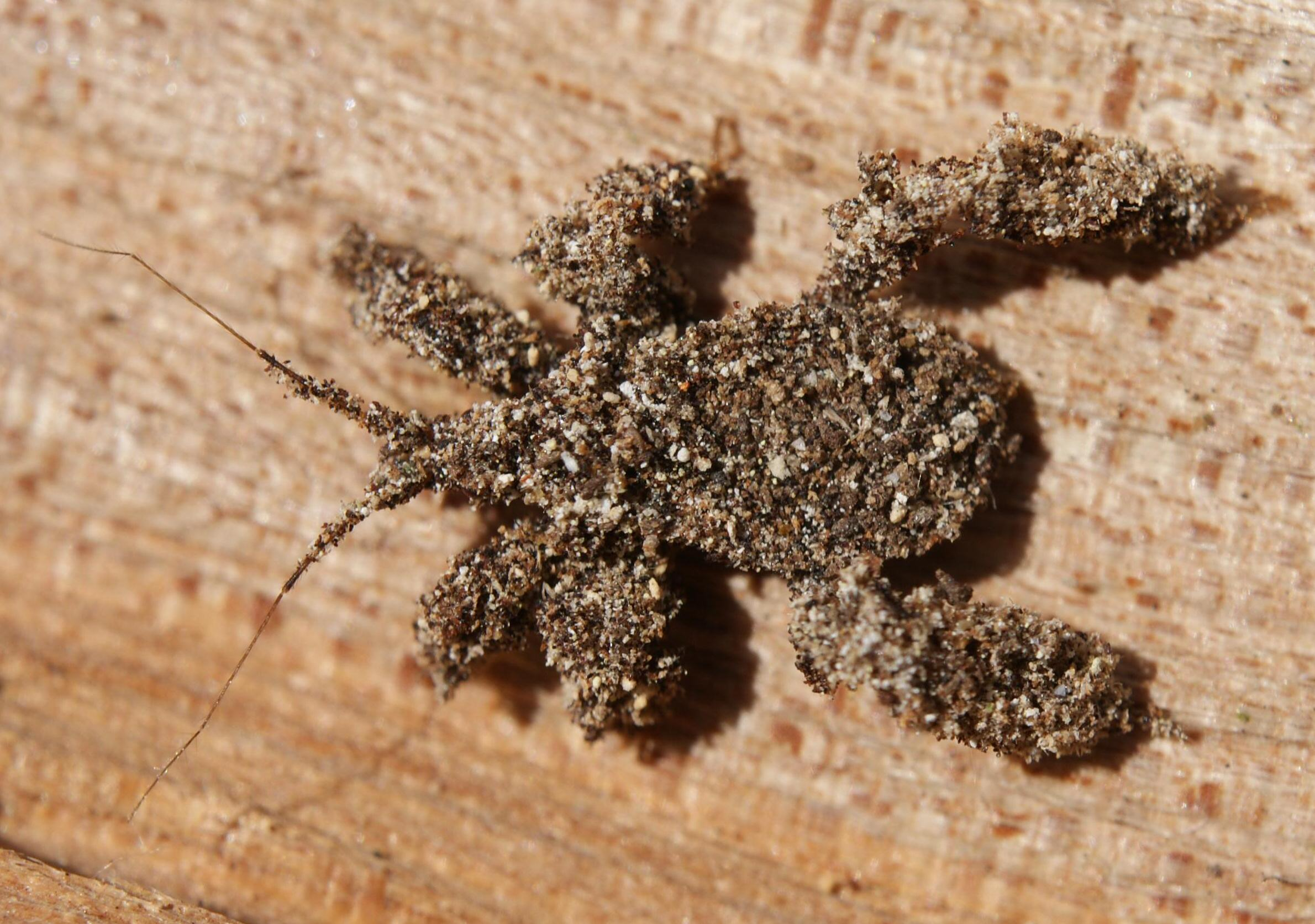
Reduvius personatus, the masked hunter bug nymph, camouflages itself with sand grains to avoid predators.

Insects are mostly small, soft bodied, and fragile compared to larger lifeforms. The immature stages are small, move slowly or are immobile, and so all stages are exposed to predation and parasitism. Insects accordingly employ multiple defensive strategies, including camouflage, mimicry, toxicity and active defense. Many insects rely on camouflage to avoid being noticed by their predators or prey. It is common among leaf beetles and weevils that feed on wood or vegetation. Stick insects mimic the forms of sticks and leaves. Many insects use mimicry to deceive predators into avoiding them. In Batesian mimicry, edible species, such as of hoverflies (the mimics), gain a survival advantage by resembling inedible species (the models). In Müllerian mimicry, inedible species, such as of wasps and bees, resemble each other so as to reduce the sampling rate by predators who need to learn that those insects are inedible. Heliconius butterflies, many of which are toxic, form Müllerian complexes, advertising their inedibility. Chemical defense is common among Coleoptera and Lepidoptera, usually being advertised by bright warning colors (aposematism), as in the monarch butterfly. As larvae, they obtain their toxicity by sequestering chemicals from the plants they eat into their own tissues. Some manufacture their own toxins. Predators that eat poisonous butterflies and moths may vomit violently, learning not to eat insects with similar markings; this is the basis of Müllerian mimicry. Some ground beetles of the family Carabidae actively defend themselves, spraying chemicals from their abdomen with great accuracy, to repel predators.

=== Pollination ===
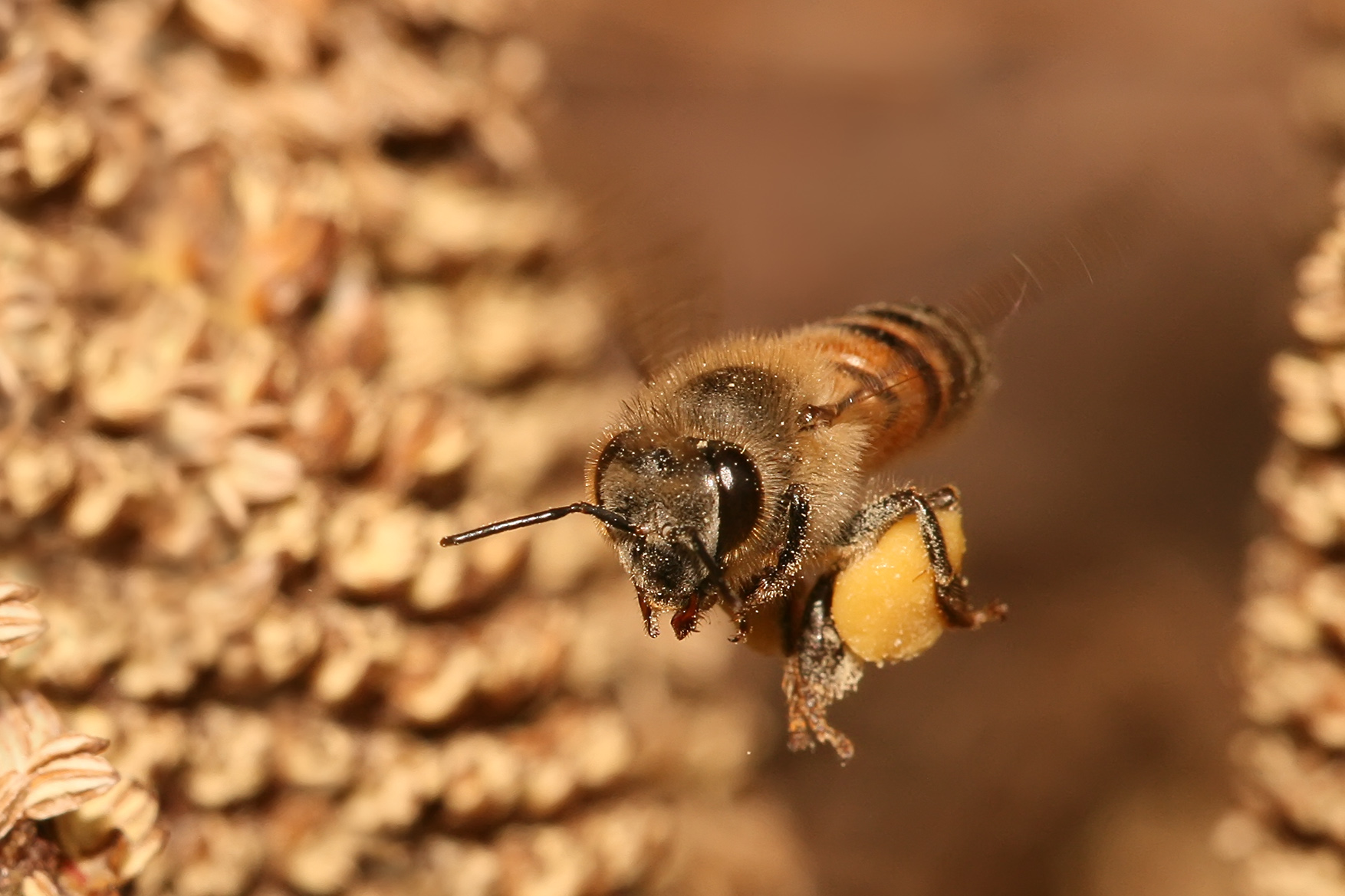
European honey bee carrying pollen in a pollen basket back to the hive

Pollination is the process by which pollen is transferred in the reproduction of plants, thereby enabling fertilisation and sexual reproduction. Most flowering plants require an animal to do the transportation. The majority of pollination is by insects. Because insects usually receive benefit for the pollination in the form of energy rich nectar it is a mutualism. The various flower traits, such as bright colors and pheromones that coevolved with their pollinators, have been called pollination syndromes, though around one third of flowers cannot be assigned to a single syndrome.

=== Parasitism ===
Many insects are parasitic. The largest group, with over 100,000 species and perhaps over a million, consists of a single clade of parasitoid wasps among the Hymenoptera. These are parasites of other insects, eventually killing their hosts. Some are hyper-parasites, as their hosts are other parasitoid wasps. Several groups of insects can be considered as either micropredators or external parasites; for example, many hemipteran bugs have piercing and sucking mouthparts, adapted for feeding on plant sap, while species in groups such as fleas, lice, and mosquitoes are hematophagous, feeding on the blood of animals.

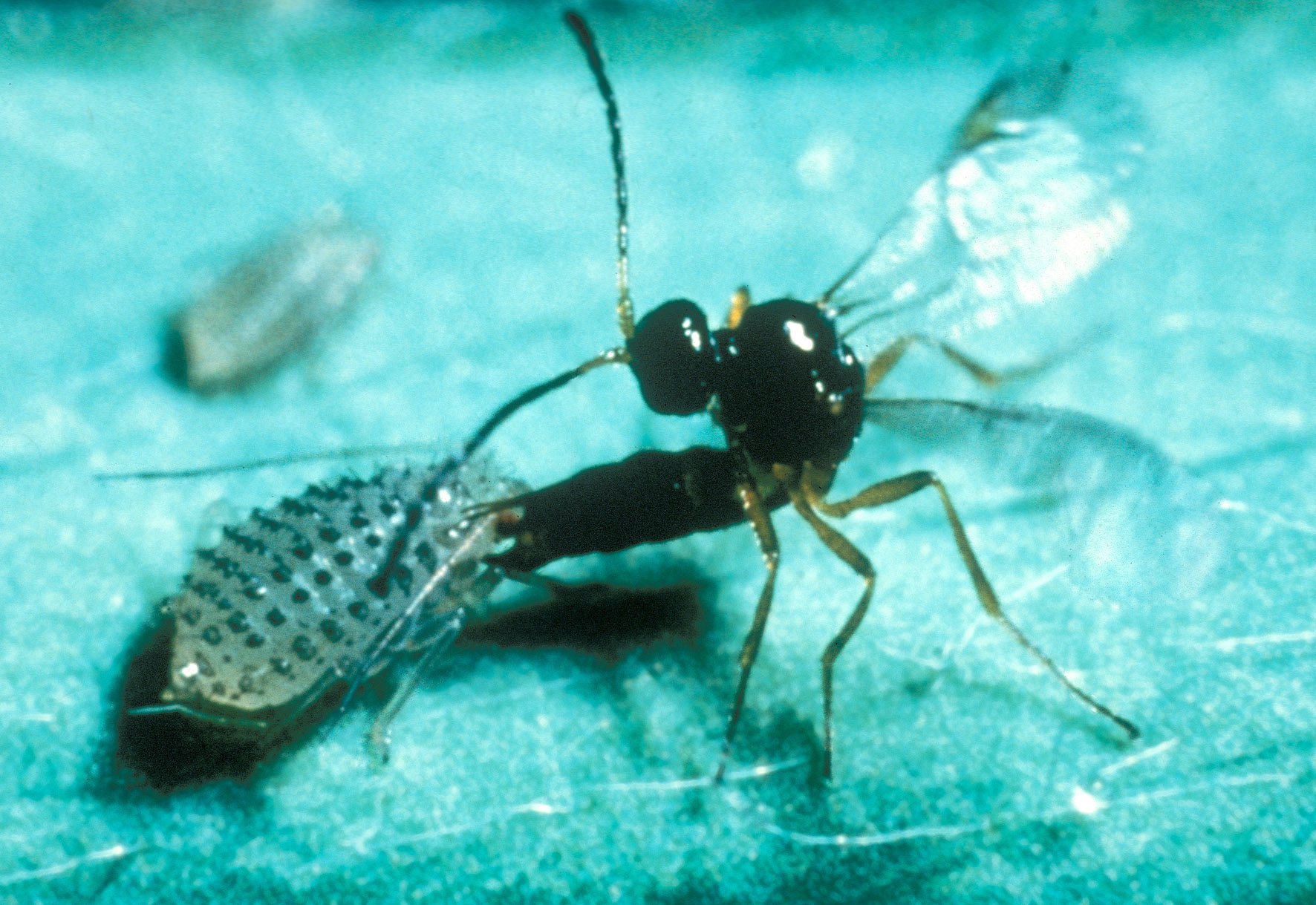
A parasitoid wasp ovipositing into an aphid

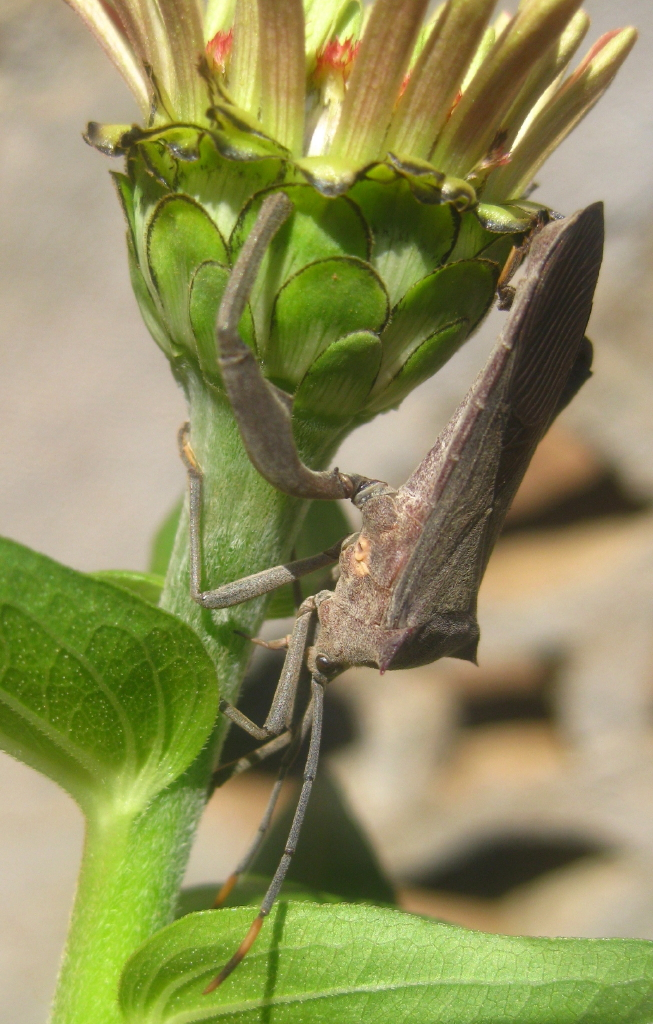
Plant parasite or micropredator: a coreid bug sucking plant sap

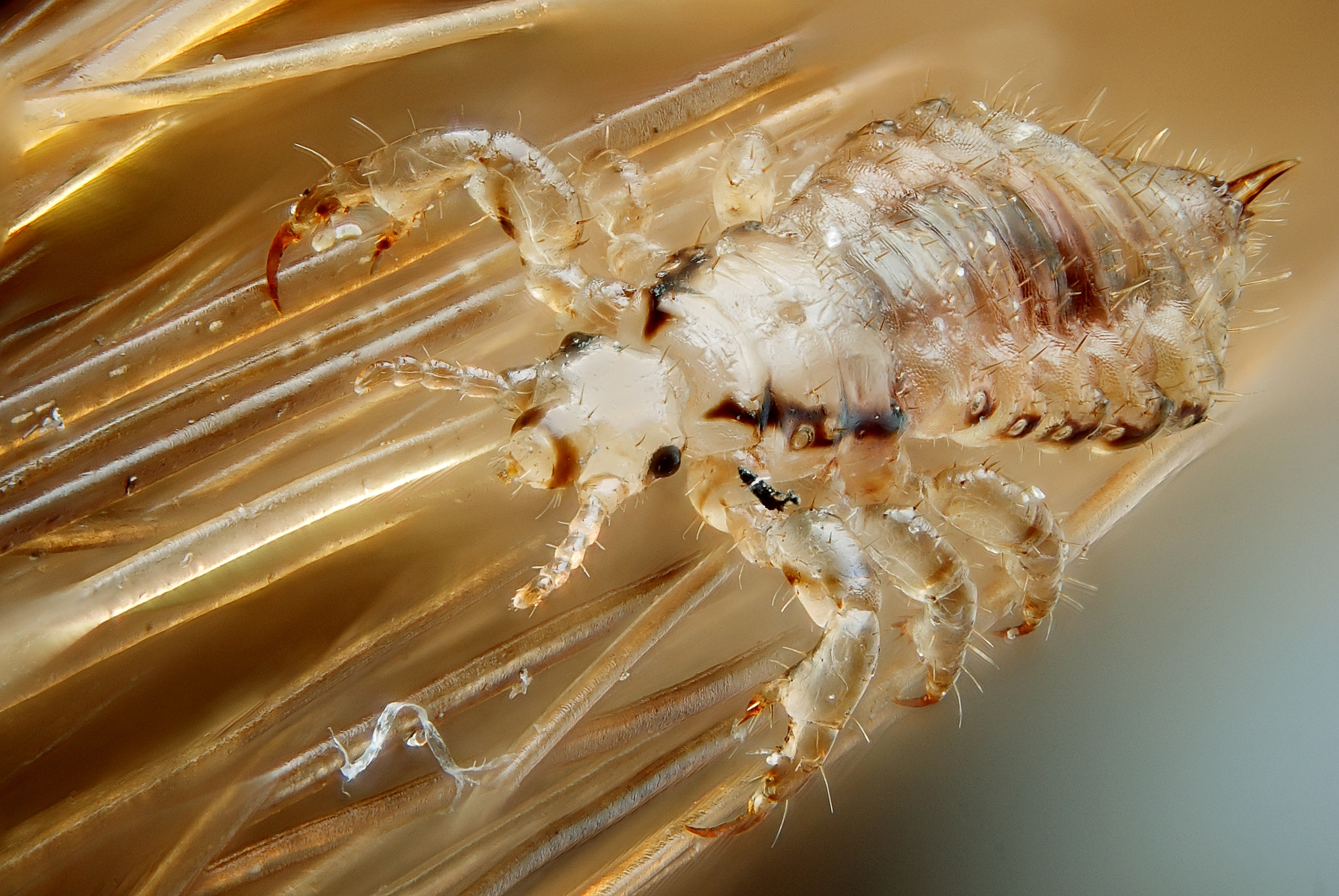
Human head-lice are directly transmitted obligate ectoparasites.

== Relationship to humans ==
=== As pests ===
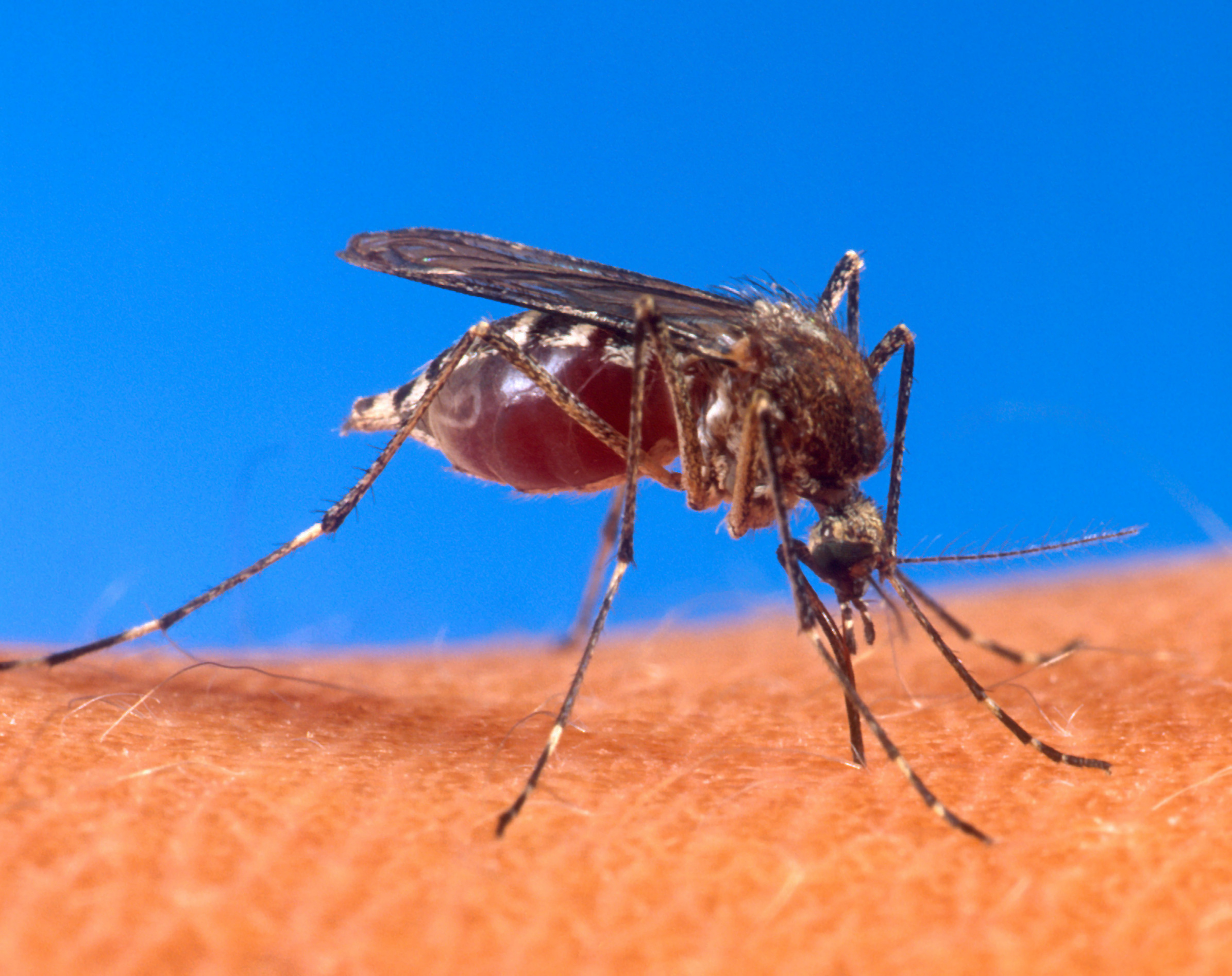
Aedes aegypti, the yellow fever mosquito, is a vector of several diseases.

Many insects are considered pests by humans. These include parasites of people and livestock, such as lice and bed bugs; mosquitoes act as vectors of several diseases. Other pests include insects like termites that damage wooden structures; herbivorous insects such as locusts, aphids, and thrips that destroy agricultural crops, or like wheat weevils damage stored agricultural produce. Farmers have often attempted to control insects with chemical insecticides, but increasingly rely on biological pest control. This uses one organism to reduce the population density of a pest organism; it is a key element of integrated pest management. Biological control is favored because insecticides can cause harm to ecosystems far beyond the intended pest targets.

=== In beneficial roles ===
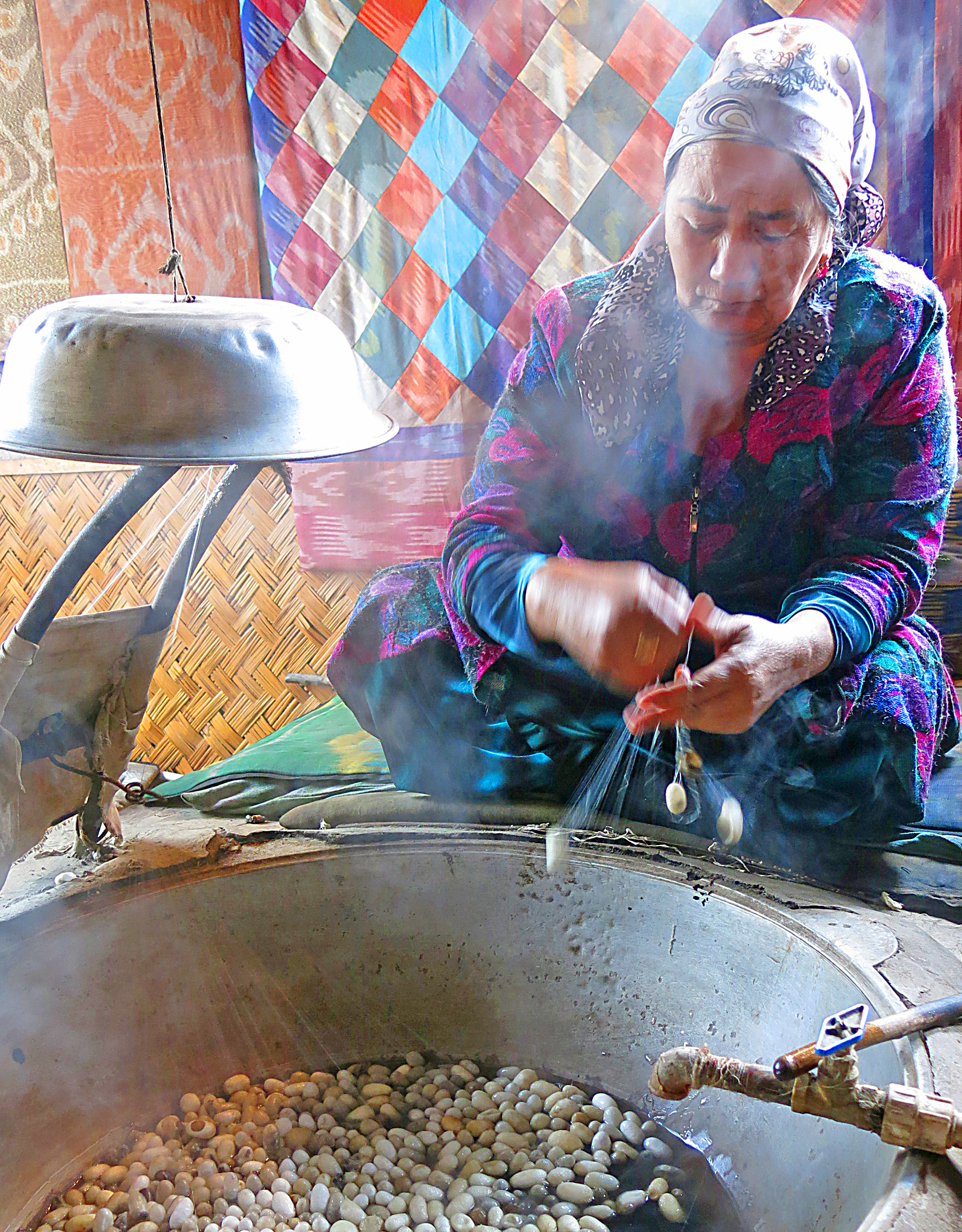
Silkworms were domesticated for silk over 5,000 years ago. Here, silk cocoons are being unrolled.

Pollination of flowering plants by insects including bees, butterflies, flies, and beetles, is economically important. The value of insect pollination of crops and fruit trees was estimated in 2021 to be about $34 billion in the US alone.

Insects produce useful substances such as honey, wax, lacquer silk, and carmine. Honey bees have been cultured by humans for thousands of years for honey. Beekeeping in pottery vessels began about 9,000 years ago in North Africa. The silkworm has greatly affected human history, as silk-driven trade established relationships between China and the rest of the world.

Insects that feed on or parasitise other insects are beneficial to humans if they thereby reduce damage to agriculture and human structures. For example, aphids feed on crops, causing economic loss, but ladybugs feed on aphids, and can be used to control them. Insects account for the vast majority of insect consumption.

Fly larvae (maggots) were formerly used to treat wounds to prevent or stop gangrene, as they would only consume dead flesh. This treatment is finding modern usage in some hospitals. Insects have gained attention as potential sources of drugs and other medicinal substances. Adult insects, such as crickets and insect larvae of various kinds, are commonly used as fishing bait.

=== Population declines ===
At least 66 insect species extinctions have been recorded since 1500, many of them on oceanic islands. Declines in insect abundance have been attributed to human activity in the form of artificial lighting, land use changes such as urbanization or farming, pesticide use, and invasive species. A 2019 research review suggested that a large proportion of insect species is threatened with extinction in the 21st century, though the details have been disputed. A larger 2020 meta-study, analyzing data from 166 long-term surveys, suggested that populations of terrestrial insects are indeed decreasing rapidly, by about 9% per decade.

=== In research ===
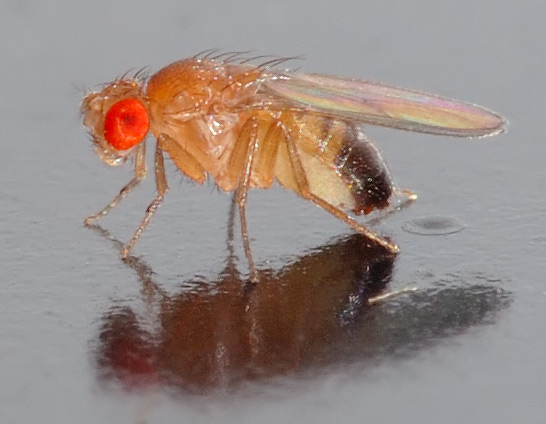
The fruit fly Drosophila melanogaster is a widely used model organism.

Insects play important roles in biological research. For example, because of its small size, short generation time and high fecundity, the common fruit fly Drosophila melanogaster is a model organism for studies in the genetics of eukaryotes, including genetic linkage, interactions between genes, chromosomal genetics, development, behavior and evolution. Because genetic systems are well conserved among eukaryotes, understanding basic cellular processes like DNA replication or transcription in fruit flies can help to understand those processes in other eukaryotes, including humans. The genome of D. melanogaster was sequenced in 2000, reflecting the organism's important role in biological research. It was found that 70% of the fly genome is similar to the human genome, supporting the theory of evolution.

=== As food ===
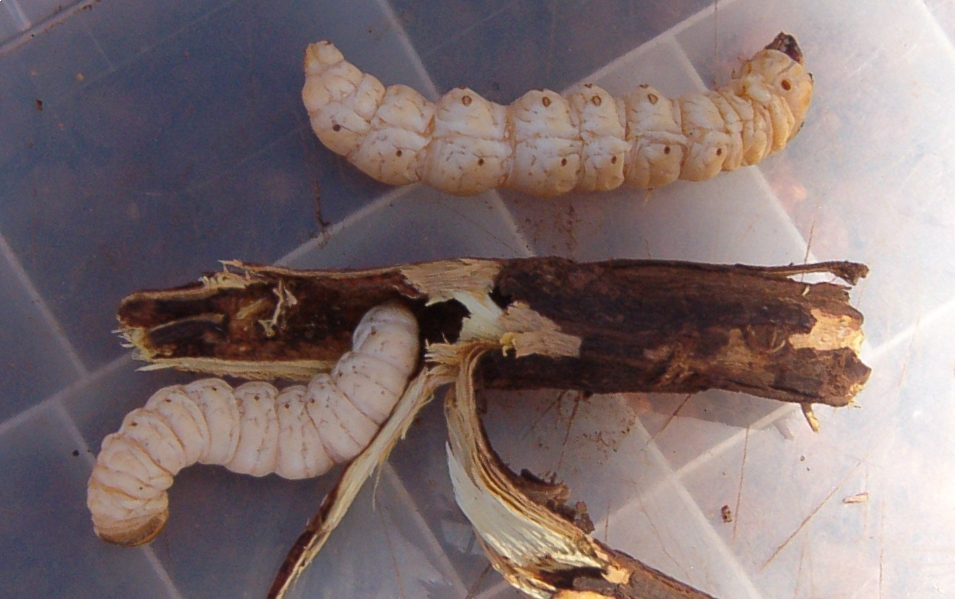
Witchetty grubs are prized as high-protein foods by Aboriginal Australians.

Insects are consumed as food in 80% of the world's nations, by people in roughly 3,000 ethnic groups. In Africa, locally abundant species of locusts and termites are a common traditional human food source. Some, especially deep-fried cicadas, are considered to be delicacies. Insects have a high protein content for their mass, and some authors suggest their potential as a major source of protein in human nutrition. In most first-world countries, however, entomophagy (the eating of insects), is taboo. They are also recommended by armed forces as a survival food for troops in adversity. Because of the abundance of insects and a worldwide concern of food shortages, the Food and Agriculture Organization of the United Nations considers that people throughout the world may have to eat insects as a food staple. Insects are noted for their nutrients, having a high content of protein, minerals and fats and are already regularly eaten by one-third of the world's population.

=== In other products ===
Black soldier fly larvae can provide protein and fats for use in cosmetics. Insect cooking oil, insect butter and fatty alcohols can be made from such insects as the superworm (Zophobas morio). Insect species including the black soldier fly or the housefly in their maggot forms, and beetle larvae such as mealworms, can be processed and used as feed for farmed animals including chicken, fish and pigs. Many species of insects are sold and kept as pets.

=== In religion and folklore ===
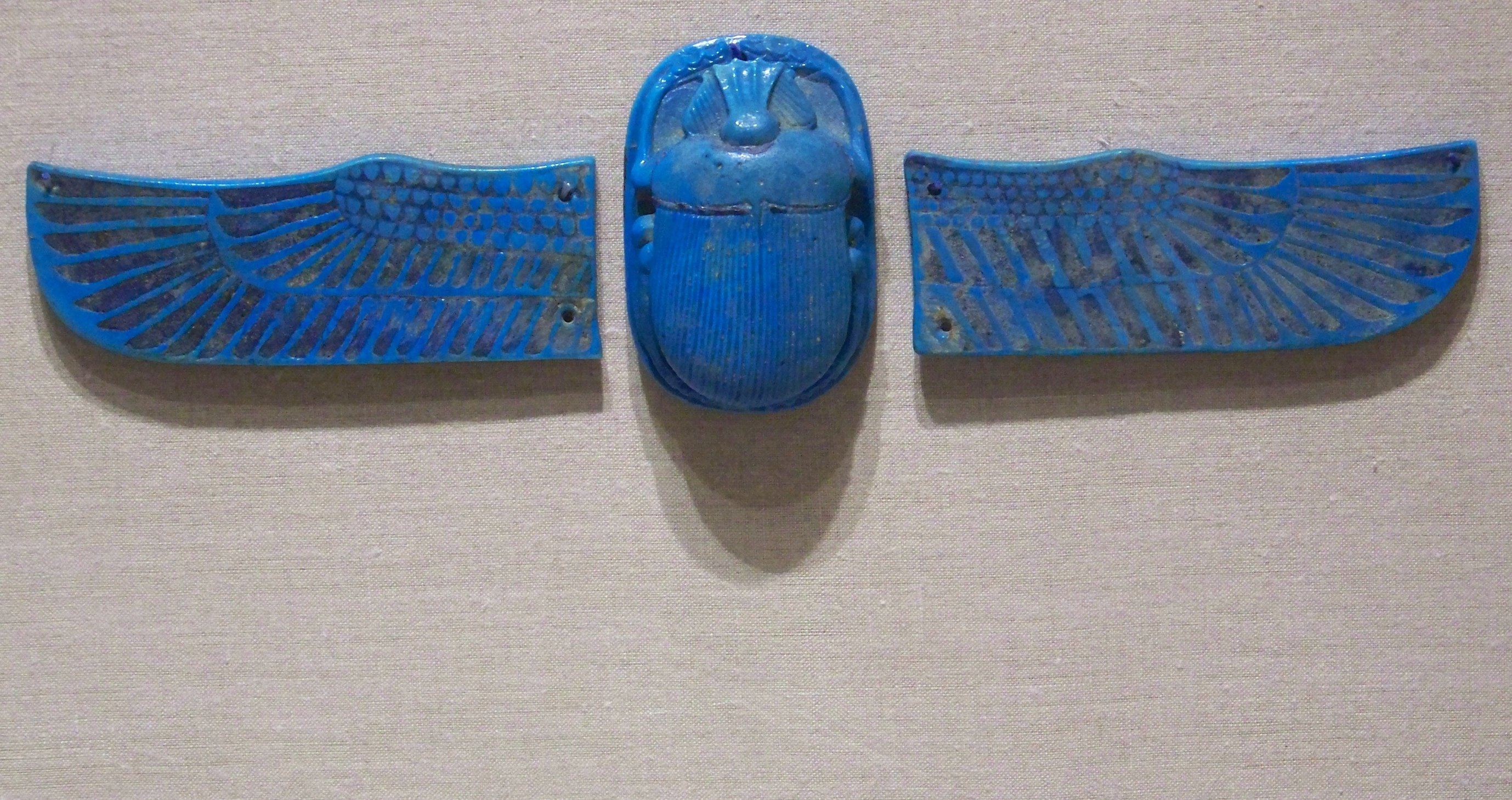
Ancient Egyptian scarab with separate wings, c. 712-342 BC

Scarab beetles held religious and cultural symbolism in ancient Egypt, Greece and some shamanistic Old World cultures. The ancient Chinese regarded cicadas as symbols of rebirth or immortality. In Mesopotamian literature, the epic poem of Gilgamesh has allusions to Odonata that signify the impossibility of immortality. In the case of the 'San' bush-men of the Kalahari, it is the praying mantis that holds much cultural significance including creation and zen-like patience in waiting.

== See also ==
- Entomology
- Ethnoentomology
- Flying and gliding animals
- Insect-borne diseases

== Sources ==
- Gullan, P. J.; Cranston, P. S. (2005). The Insects: An Outline of Entomology (3rd ed.). Oxford: Blackwell Publishing. ISBN 978-1-4051-1113-3.
- Gullan, P. J.; Cranston, P. S. (2014). The Insects: An Outline of Entomology (5th ed.). Oxford: Wiley Blackwell. ISBN 978-1-118-84616-2.
- Nation, James L. (2001). Insect Physiology and Biochemistry (1st ed.). CRC Press. ISBN 978-0-8493-1181-9.
- Resh, Vincent H.; Carde, Ring T. (2009). Encyclopedia of Insects (2 ed.). Academic Press. ISBN 978-0-12-374144-8.
- Schowalter, Timothy Duane (2006). Insect Ecology: An Ecosystem Epproach (2nd (illustrated) ed.). Academic Press. ISBN 978-0-12-088772-9. Archived from the original on 3 June 2016.
