= Yuri Alexandrovich Popov =

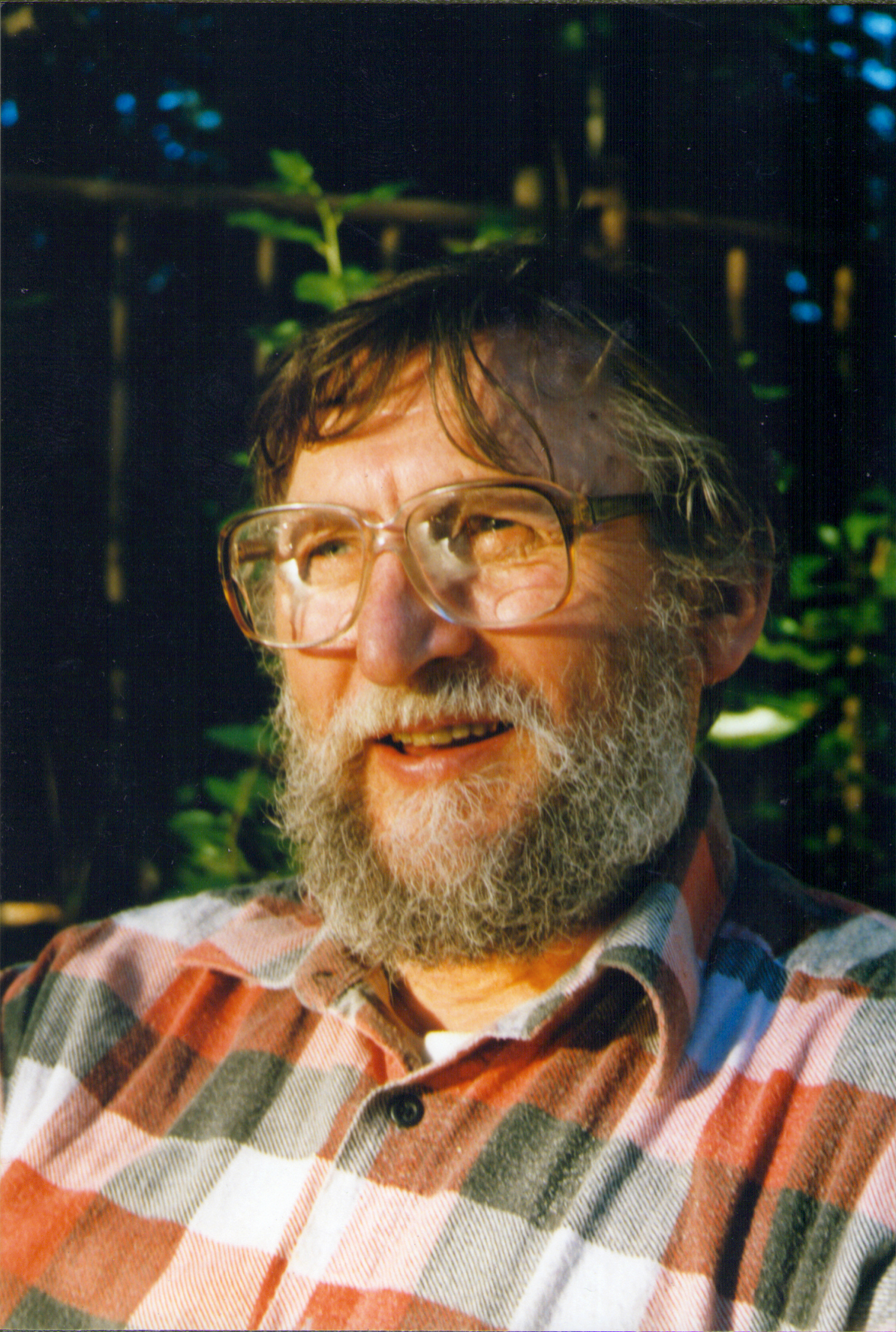
- Born: 5 March 1936; Moscow, Russia
- Died: 16 November 2016; Lobnya, Russia
- Education: Moscow State University (1959)
- Known for: Paleoentomology
- Scientific career
- Fields: Paleoentomology

Yuri Alexandrovich Popov (Russian: Юрий Александрович Попов) (5 March 1936 – 16 November 2016) was a Soviet and Russian paleoentomologist, an authority on the taxonomy and evolution of fossil true bugs (Heteroptera) and Coleorrhyncha. He described more than 20 new families and subfamilies and 300 new genera and species from the Mesozoic and Cenozoic. He also was one of the founders of the modern higher classification of true bugs: three of seven heteropteran infraorders have been established by him (Nepomorpha Popov, 1968, Gerromorpha Popov, 1971, and Leptopodomorpha Popov, 1971). He was the author of more than 170 publications, including a classic monograph on the evolution of water bugs.

== Selected publications ==
- Popov, Yu.A. (1971) Historical development of true bugs of the infraorder Nepomorpha (Heteroptera). Trudy Paleontologicheskogo Instituta AN SSSR 129: 1–230 (in Russian).
- Popov, Yu.A. & Shcherbakov, D.E. (1991) Mesozoic Peloridioidea and their ancestors (Insecta: Hemiptera, Coleorrhyncha). Geologica et Palaeontologica 25: 215–235.
- Popov, Yu.A., Dolling, W.R. & Whalley, P.E.S. (1994) British Upper Triassic and Lower Jurassic Heteroptera and Coleorrhyncha (Insecta: Hemiptera). Genus, 5(4): 307–347.

== Families and subfamilies of fossil Hemiptera established by Yuri Popov ==
- Karabasiidae Popov, 1985 (Coleorrhyncha Peloridioidea)
- Hoploridiinae Popov et Shcherbakov, 1991 (Karabasiidae)
- Propreocorinae Popov, Dolling et Whalley, 1994 (Ochteridae)
- Shurabellidae Popov, 1971 (Corixoidea)
- Archaeocorixinae Popov, 1968 (Corixidae)
- Ijanectinae Popov, 1971 (Corixidae)
- Velocorixinae Popov, 1986 (Corixidae)
- Corixonectinae Popov, 1986 (Corixidae)
- Diapherininae Popov, 1988 (Corixidae)
- Scaphocoridae Popov, 1968 (Notonectoidea)
- Mesotrephidae Popov, 1971 (Notonectoidea)
- Sphaerodemopsinae Popov, 1971 (Naucoridae)
- Stygeonepinae Popov, 1971 (Belostomatidae)
- Pterocimicidae Popov, Dolling & Whalley, 1994 (Nepomorpha)
- Enicocorinae Popov, 1980 (Saldidae)
- Taimyrocoridae Popov, 2016 (Cimicoidea)
- Ciorullinae Popov, 2004 (Microphysidae)
- Ignotingidae Zhang, Golub, Popov et Shcherbakov, 2005 (Tingoidea)
- Hispanocaderidae Golub, Popov et Arillo, 2012 (Tingoidea)
- Tingiometrinae Heiss, Golub et Popov, 2015 (Tingidae)
- Kobdocoridae Popov, 1986 (Aradoidea)
- Lygaenocorinae Popov, 1961 (Lygaeidae)
- Monstrocoreinae Popov, 1968 (Coreidae)
- Mesopentacoridae Popov, 1968 (Pentatomoidea)

== Genera and families named after Yuri Popov ==
- Yuripopovia Jarzembowski, 1991 (Progonocimicidae)
- Popoviana Herczek, 1997 (Miridae; nom.nov. pro Popovia Herczek 1993)
- Archepopovia Golub 2001 (Tingidae)
- Yurigocimex Martins-Neto et Gallego, 2003 (Progonocimicidae)
- Popovigocimex Martins-Neto et Gallego, 2003 (Progonocimicidae)
- Popovus Oezdikmen et Demir, 2007 (Progonocimicidae; nom.nov. pro Progonus Popov, 1986)
- Popovophysa McKellar et Engel, 2011 (Microphysidae)
- Yuripopovinidae Azar et al., 2011 and Yuripopovina Azar et al., 2011 (Coreoidea)
- Yuripopoverus Stroinski et Szwedo, 2011 (Ricaniidae)
- Popovineura Fedotova et Perkovsky, 2014 (Cecidomyiidae)
