= Croudace Bay Formation =

Late Permian geologic formation in New South Wales, Australia

- Stratigraphic range: Lopingian (Wuchiapingian); ~Lopingian
- Type: Geological formation
- Unit of: Newcastle Coal Measures
- Sub-units: Belmont Conglomerate Member
- Underlies: Upper Pilot Coal
- Overlies: Fassifern Coal
- Thickness: 20–32 cm (7.9–12.6 in) (Belmont insect bed)

Lithology
- Primary: Coal, conglomerate and sandstone
- Other: Volcanic chert and shale

Location
- Coordinates: 32.98°S 151.645°E (Warner's Bay)
- Region: Hunter Region
- Country: Australia
- Croudace Bay Formation (Australia) Croudace Bay Formation (New South Wales)

The Croudace Bay Formation is a geological formation dating back to approximately ~255 Ma, during the Wuchiapingian age of the Lopingian (Late Permian). Its lithology consists of coal, conglomerates, sandstones, and smaller amounts of volcanic chert and shales. It is best known for the Belmont insect bed, part of the Belmont Conglomerate Member in the upper strata of the formation.

== Belmont Conglomerate Member ==
The Belmont Conglomerate Member filled an engraved river valley and the stream, which transported the gravel that was deposited within this valley, flowed in a south-southwest direction at about 210°. The gravel which filled the valley originated from the New England Fold Belt to the north-east, a highland area during the Permian. This river flowed into the Hunter Trough, a part of the Sydney Basin, depositing gravel within the Belmont area, along with sand further downstream, west of Fennel Bay in the Lake Macquarie area. The Belmont Conglomerate is one of the several lenticular fluvial bodies deposited during the Late Permian in the Newcastle Coal Measures. The Awaba and Warner's Bay tuffs, overlaying and underlaying the Belmont Conglomerate respectively, become thinner from north to south.

=== Belmont insect bed ===
The Belmont insect bed consists of lithified volcanic chert, represented by a fine groundmass of crystalized glass shards and fine, large crystals consisting primarily of feldspars, along with additional opaque material. In thin sections, the grains show linear alignment, and within sliced insect seam blocks, fine horizontal bedding planes are visible. Cross-lamination has not been observed. There is a slight upward fining within the insect seam, more noticeable in some specimens than others. The seam descends gently towards the west and weathers to generally rhomboidal blocks. In the majority of localities there are three distinct vertical zones. One section of insect bed from site 206 is typical of the sequence at all other sites sampled along the Violet Town Ridge. In other localities there are variations in the presence and thickness of a conchostracan layer, located in the zonation of the fossil insects and in the absence or presence of a basal layer known as the "chopped straw" zone.

== Paleobiota ==
=== Coleoptera ===
Coleopterans represent all beetles.

Coleopterans of the Croudace Bay Formation
Genus	Species	Clade	Image
Permosyne	P. affinis	Permosynoidea, Permosynidae	
Permosyne	P. belmontensis	Permosynoidea, Permosynidae	
Permosyne	P. mitchelli	Permosynoidea, Permosynidae	
Permosyne	P. pincombeae	Permosynoidea, Permosynidae	

=== Hemiptera ===
==== Auchenorrhyncha ====
Auchenorrhyncha includes cicadas, leafhoppers, treehoppers, planthoppers, and spittlebugs.

Auchenorrhynchans of the Croudace Bay Formation
Genus	Species	Clade	Image
Anomaloscytina	A. incompleta	Scytinopteroidea, Scytinopteridae	
Anomaloscytina	A. metapteryx	Scytinopteroidea, Scytinopteridae	
Austroprosbole	A. maculata	Palaeontinoidea, Dunstaniidae	
Belmontocarta	B. perfecta	Cercopoidea, Eoscarterellidae	
Elliptoscarta	E. ovalis	Scytinopteroidea, Scytinopteridae	Tegmen of E. ovalis.
Eochiliocycla	E. angusta	Scytinopteroidea, incertae sedis	
Homaloscytina	H. plana	Prosboloidea, Prosbolidae	Tegmen of H. plana.
Mitchelloneura	M. permiana	Prosboloidea, Prosbolidae	
Orthoscytina	O. belmontensis	Prosboloidea, Prosbolidae	Tegmen of O. mitchelli.
Orthoscytina	O. indistincta	Prosboloidea, Prosbolidae	Tegmen of O. mitchelli.
Orthoscytina	O. irregularis	Prosboloidea, Prosbolidae	Tegmen of O. mitchelli.
Orthoscytina	O. mitchelli	Prosboloidea, Prosbolidae	Tegmen of O. mitchelli.
Orthoscytina	O. obliqua	Prosboloidea, Prosbolidae	Tegmen of O. mitchelli.
Orthoscytina	O. pincombei	Prosboloidea, Prosbolidae	Tegmen of O. mitchelli.
Orthoscytina	O. quinquemedia	Prosboloidea, Prosbolidae	Tegmen of O. mitchelli.
Orthoscytina	O. subcostalis	Prosboloidea, Prosbolidae	Tegmen of O. mitchelli.
Orthoscytina	O. tetraneura	Prosboloidea, Prosbolidae	Tegmen of O. mitchelli.
Palaeovicia	P. incerta	Scytinopteroidea, Stenoviciidae	
Paraknightia	P. magnifica	Scytinopteroidea, Paraknightiidae	
Permagra	P. distincta	Scytinopteroidea, Stenoviciidae	
Permocentrus	P. trivenulata (Formerly Permoscarta trivenulata)	Scytinopteroidea, Stenoviciidae	Tegmen of P. trivenulata.
Permobrachus	P. dubia (Formerly Permodiphthera dubia)	Prosboloidea, Prosbolidae	Tegmen of P. dubia.
Permobrachus	P. magnus	Prosboloidea, Prosbolidae	Tegmen of P. dubia.
Permodiphthera	P. robusta	Prosboloidea, Prosbolidae	Tegmen of P. robusta.
Permofulgor	P. belmontensis	Permofulgoridae	Tegmen of P. belmontensis.
Permofulgor	P. indistinctus (Synonym of P. belmontensis; specimen is a counterpart)	Permofulgoridae	Tegmen of P. belmontensis.
Permoglyphis	P. belmontensis	Prosboloidea, Prosbolidae	
Permojassus	P. australis	Scytinopteroidea, Scytinopteridae	
Permojassus	P. dubius	Scytinopteroidea, Scytinopteridae	
Permoscarta	P. mitchelli	Scytinopteroidea, Stenoviciidae	Tegmen of P. mitchelli.
Permovicia	P. obscura	Scytinopteroidea, Stenoviciidae	
Psocoscytina	P. bifida	Scytinopteroidea, Scytinopteridae	
Stanleyana	S. pulchra	Scytinopteroidea, Stenoviciidae	
Stenoscytina	S. australiensis	Scytinopteroidea, Scytinopteridae	Tegmen of S. australiensis.
Stenovicia	S. angustata	Scytinopteroidea, Stenoviciidae	
Scytinopteridae indet.	sp. indet.	Scytinopteroidea, Scytinopteridae	Body of an indeterminate scytinopterid.

==== Coleorrhyncha ====
Coleorrhyncha includes moss bugs and extinct relatives such as the Progonocimicidae.

Coleorrhynchans of the Croudace Bay Formation
Genus	Species	Clade	Image
Actinoscytina	A. belmontensis	Progonocimicoidea, Progonocimicidae	Tegmen of A. belmontensis.

==== Paleorrhyncha ====
Paleorrhynchans of the Croudace Bay Formation
Genus	Species	Clade	Image
Austroscytina	A. imperfecta	Archescytinoidea, Archescytinidae	
Bekkerscytina	B. primitiva	Archescytinoidea, Archescytinidae	
Eoscytina	E. incompleta	Archescytinoidea, Archescytinidae	
Eoscytina	E. migdisovae	Archescytinoidea, Archescytinidae	

==== Sternorrhyncha ====
Sternorrhynchans include aphids, whiteflies, and scale insects.

Sternorrhynchans of the Croudace Bay Formation
Genus	Species	Clade	Image
Belpsylla	B. reticulata	Protopsyllidioidea, Protopsyllidiidae	
Clavopsyllidium	C. minutum	Protopsyllidioidea, Permopsyllidiidae	
Eopsyllidium	E. delicatulum	Protopsyllidioidea, Permopsyllidiidae	
Eupincombea	E. postica	Pincombeoidea, Pincombeidae	
Permocapitus	P. globulus	Pincombeoidea, Pincombeidae	
Permocephalus	P. knighti	Pincombeoidea, Pincombeidae	
Permopsyllidium	P. affine	Protopsyllidioidea, Permopsyllidiidae	
Permopsyllidium	P. mitchelli	Protopsyllidioidea, Permopsyllidiidae	
Permopsyllidops	P. stanleyi	Protopsyllidioidea, Permopsyllidiidae	
Permopsylloides	P. insolita	Protopsyllidioidea, Protopsyllidiidae	
Permothea	P. latipennis	Protopsyllidioidea, Permopsyllidiidae	Tegmen of P. latipennis.
Permotheella	P. scytinopteroides	Protopsyllidioidea, Permopsyllidiidae	
Pincombea	P. mirabilis	Pincombeoidea, Pincombeidae	Tegmen of P. mirabilis.
Protopincombea	P. obscura	Pincombeoidea, Pincombeidae	
Protopsyllidium	P. australe	Protopsyllidioidea, Protopsyllidiidae	
Protopsyllidium	P. sinuatum	Protopsyllidioidea, Protopsyllidiidae	
Protopsyllops	P. minuta	Protopsyllidioidea, Protopsyllidiidae	
Psocopsyllidium	P. media	Protopsyllidioidea, Permopsyllidiidae	
Psyllidella	P. magna	Protopsyllidioidea, Protopsyllidiidae	
Psyllidiana	P. davisia	Protopsyllidioidea, Protopsyllidiidae	
Tripsyllidium	T. wadei	Protopsyllidioidea, Protopsyllidiidae	

=== Mecoptera ===
Mecopterans are known as scorpionflies.

Mecopterans of the Croudace Bay Formation
Genus	Species	Clade	Image
Belmontia	B. mitchelli	Belmontiidae	
Parabelmontia	P. permiana (Synonym of Belmontia)	Belmontiidae	
Mesochorista (All listed species previously under Permochorista)	M. affinis	Permochoristidae	Wing of M. australica.
Mesochorista (All listed species previously under Permochorista)	M. australica	Permochoristidae	Wing of M. australica.
Mesochorista (All listed species previously under Permochorista)	M. mitchelli	Permochoristidae	Wing of M. australica.
Mesochorista (All listed species previously under Permochorista)	M. sinuata	Permochoristidae	Wing of M. australica.

=== Protelytroptera ===
The protelytropterans are considered a stem group of modern earwigs.

Protelytroptera of the Croudace Bay Formation
Genus	Species	Clade	Image
Permophilus	P. pincombei	Permophilidae	
Protocoleus	P. mitchelli	Protocoleidae	

=== Thysanoptera ===
Thysanopterans are known as thunderbugs.

Thysanopterans of the Croudace Bay Formation
Genus	Species	Clade	Image
Austrocypha	A. abrupta	Lophioneurida, Lophioneuridae	
Lophioneura	L. angusta	Lophioneurida, Lophioneuridae	
Lophioneura	L. conjuncta	Lophioneurida, Lophioneuridae	
Lophioneura	L. ustulata	Lophioneurida, Lophioneuridae	
Lophiocypha	L. maxima	Lophioneurida, Lophioneuridae	
Lophiocypha	L. permiana	Lophioneurida, Lophioneuridae	
Lophiocypha	L. stanleyi	Lophioneurida, Lophioneuridae	
Zoropsocus	Z. delicatulus	Lophioneurida, Lophioneuridae	
Zoropsocus	Z. stanleyi	Lophioneurida, Lophioneuridae	

=== Other ===
Other insects of the Croudace Bay Formation
Genus	Species	Clade	Image
Permithone	P. belmontensis	Neuropterida, Permithonidae	
Permosialis	P. belmontensis	Neoptera, Permosialidae	
Eumegasecoptera indet.	sp. indet.	Megasecoptera, Eumegasecoptera incertae sedis	
Meganisoptera indet.	sp. indet.	Meganisoptera, incertae sedis	
Paraplecoptera indet.	sp. indet.	Paraplecoptera, incertae sedis	

== See also ==
- Coal measures
