= Systelloderes biceps =

Scientific classification
- Domain: Eukaryota
- Kingdom: Animalia
- Phylum: Arthropoda
- Class: Insecta
- Order: Hemiptera
- Suborder: Heteroptera
- Family: Enicocephalidae
- Genus: Systelloderes
- Species: S. biceps

Binomial name
- Systelloderes biceps (Say, 1832)

Species of true bug

Systelloderes biceps is a species of gnat bug in the family Enicocephalidae. It is found in Central America and North America.
