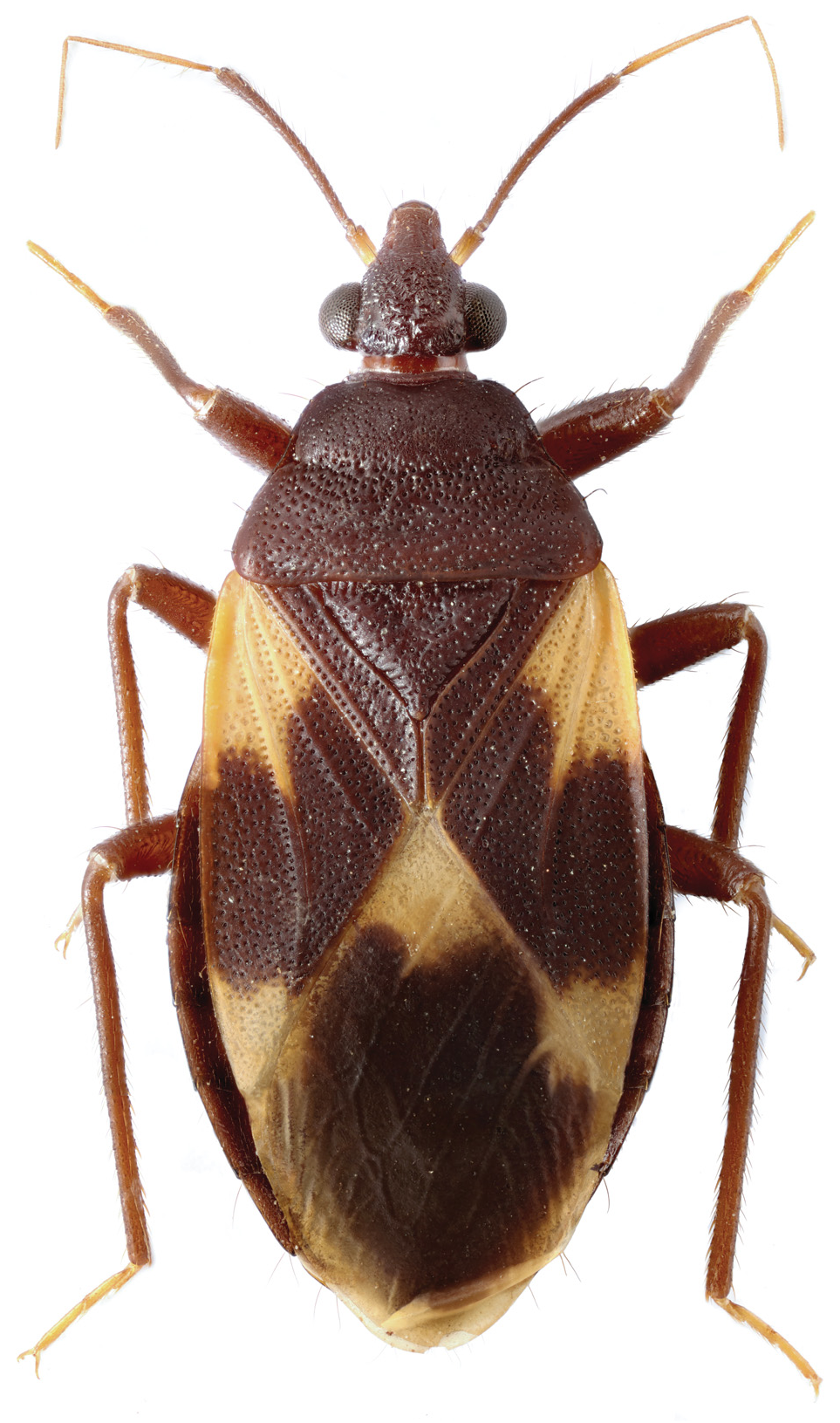
- Medocostes lestoni from Cameroon

Scientific classification
- Kingdom: Animalia
- Phylum: Arthropoda
- Class: Insecta
- Order: Hemiptera
- Suborder: Heteroptera
- Family: Medocostidae; Štys, 1967
- Genus: Medocostes; Štys, 1967
- Species: M. lestoni

Binomial name
- Medocostes lestoni Štys, 1967

= Medocostes =

Genus of insects

Medocostidae is a family of true bugs with the sole genus Medocostes with a single species known from Africa. The family was created in 1967 by Pavel Štys with a single genus containing a single species (initially with 2 species described) which was obtained in tropical Africa.

Medocostes lestoni was found in the bark of dead trees and is thought to be predaceous. The generic name is an anagram of Scotomedes which is the type genus of the family Velocipedidae. The bug has a short head with ocelli. The labium has segment 4 elongated, as long as the second and third combined and the first segment is nearly absent. The mesepimeron and metepisternum are covered by the scent gland opening. The wing membrane has 3 long basal cells with many simple or bifurcating veins emerging from them. Initially Štys described a second species (Medocostes carayoni) in the genus but this was synonymized later. Although placed within the Cimicomorpha, molecular phylogeny studies until 2008 have not examined the group.
