= Patapius spinosus =

Scientific classification
- Domain: Eukaryota
- Kingdom: Animalia
- Phylum: Arthropoda
- Class: Insecta
- Order: Hemiptera
- Suborder: Heteroptera
- Family: Leptopodidae
- Genus: Patapius
- Species: P. spinosus

Binomial name
- Patapius spinosus (Rossi, 1790)

Synonyms
- Acanthia spinosa Rossi, 1790

Species of true bug

Patapius spinosus is a species of spiny-legged bug in the family Leptopodidae. It is found in Africa, Europe and Northern Asia (excluding China), North America, and South America.
