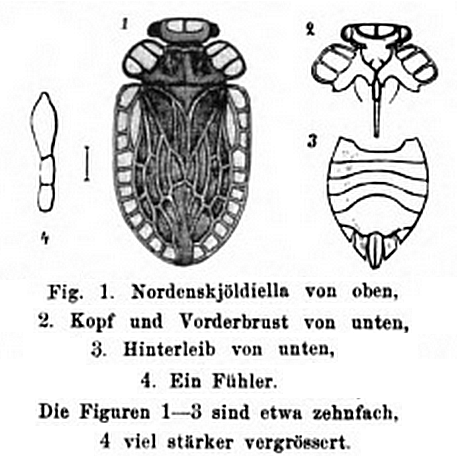

Scientific classification
- Kingdom: Animalia
- Phylum: Arthropoda
- Clade: Pancrustacea
- Class: Insecta
- Order: Hemiptera
- Family: Peloridiidae
- Genus: Peloridium
- Species: P. hammoniorum

Binomial name
- Peloridium hammoniorum Breddin, 1897

Synonyms
- Nordenskjoldiella insignis Haglund, 1899

= Peloridium hammoniorum =

Species of true bug

Peloridium hammoniorum is a species of moss bug from southern South America.

It was first described in 1897 by Gustav Breddin from a specimen found at Puerto Toro on Navarin Island in Tierra del Fuego. A Swedish expedition collected a second specimen in a forest on the Brunswick Peninsula near Punta Arenas, Chile, and Haglund unknowingly described it as a new genus and species (Nordenskjoldiella insignis), but it later proved to be a sub-brachypterous female corresponding with the macropterous male described by Breddin.

Peloridium hammoniorum is the only Peloridiidae that has both a macropterous and a flightless brachypterous form, all others have only flightless forms. A macropterous form is unknown in the other described species, P. pomponorum.
