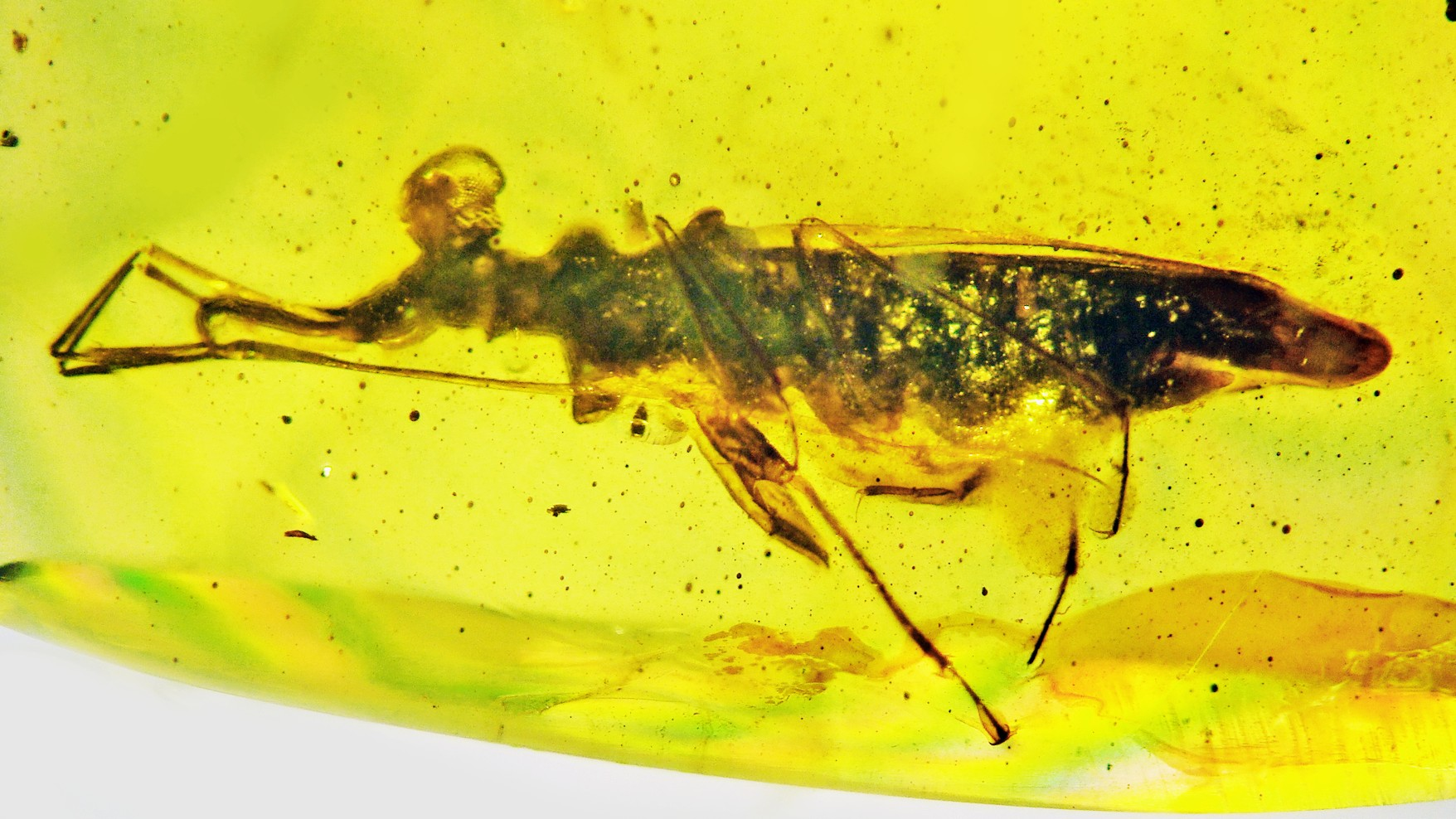

Scientific classification
- Kingdom: Animalia
- Phylum: Arthropoda
- Class: Insecta
- Order: Hemiptera
- Suborder: Heteroptera
- Family: Leptopodidae
- Genus: †Palaeotanyrhina; Poinar, Brown & Kóbor, 2022
- Species: †P. exophthalma

Binomial name
- †Palaeotanyrhina exophthalma Poinar, Brown & Kóbor, 2022

= Palaeotanyrhina =

Extinct genus of insects

Palaeotanyrhina is a genus of extinct insects in the order Hemiptera. The type species Palaeotanyrhina exophthalma had large bulging eyes and a highly elongated rostrum. P. exophthalma lived 100 million years ago during the Middle Cretaceous period in modern day Myanmar. The specimen was found in amber southwest of Maingkhwan in the Kachin state (26°20'N, 96°36'E).

Palaeotanyrhina was originally placed into the infraorder Cimicomorpha and a new family, Palaeotanyrhinidae, was established for its accommodation. A subsequent study concluded that it is a member of Leptopodomorpha, and Palaeotanyrhinidae was downgraded to a junior synonym of Leptopodidae.
