= Lophioneurida =

Lophioneurida Temporal range: Westphalian–Santonian

Scientific classification
- Kingdom: Animalia
- Phylum: Arthropoda
- Clade: Pancrustacea
- Class: Insecta
- Order: Thysanoptera
- Suborder: †Lophioneurida; Tillyard, 1921

Order of insects

Lophioneurida is an extinct suborder of Thysanoptera, dating from the Carboniferous to the Cretaceous. It is likely paraphyletic, with modern thrips having evolved from members of the group.

== Taxonomy ==
After ULITZKA, 2021

- Order †Lophioneurida Tillyard
  - Family †Lophioneuridae Tillyard
    - †Austrocypha Tillyard, 1935 Croudace Bay Formation, Australia, Late Permian (Changhsingian)
    - †Burmacypha Zherikhin, 2000 Burmese amber, Myanmar, Late Cretaceous (Cenomanian)
    - †Cyphoneura Carpenter, 1932 Wellington Formation, Kansas, Early Permian (Artinskian)
    - †Cyphoneurodes Becker-Migdisova, 1953 Wellington Formation, Kansas, Early Permian (Artinskian)
    - †Lophiocypha Tillyard, 1935 : Iva-Gora Beds Formation, Arkangelsk, Russia Middle Permian (Roadian) Croudace Bay Formation, Australia, Late Permian (Changhsingian)
    - †Lophioneura Tillyard, 1921 Newcastle Coal Measures, Australia Late Permian (Wuchiapingian) Croudace Bay Formation, Australia, Late Permian (Changhsingian)
    - †Lophioneurodes Becker-Migdisova 1953 Tersinskaya Formation, Kemerovo, Russia Early Permian (Kungurian)
    - †Lophiosina Nel et al. 2014 Daohugou, China, Middle-Late Jurassic (Bathonian-Oxfordian)
    - †Jantardachus Vishnyakova, 1981 Taimyr amber, Russia, Late Cretaceous (Santonian)
    - †Karataocypha Vishnyakova, 1981 Karabastau Formation, Middle/Upper Jurassic (Callovian-Oxfordian)
    - †Undacypha Vishnyakova, 1981 Green Series, Germany, Early Jurassic, (Toarcian) Daohugou, China, Middle-Late Jurassic (Bathonian-Oxfordian) Glushkovo Formation, Russia, Upper Jurassic (Tithonian) Koonwarra Fossil Bed, Australia, Early Cretaceous (Aptian)
    - †Vitriala Becker-Migdisova, 1961 Mitina Formation, Kemerovo, Russia Middle Permian (Roadian)
  - †Moundthripidae Nel, Azar & Nel
    - †Moundthrips Nel, Azar & Nel, 2007 Lebanese amber, Early Cretaceous (Barremian)
  - Family †Westphalothripidesidae Nel, Azar, Prokop, Roques, Hodebert & Nel
    - †Westphalothripides Nel, Azar, Prokop, Roques, Hodebert & Nel, 2012 France, Late Carboniferous (Westphalian)
  - Family †Zoropsocidae Tillyard
    - †Mogsonus Vishnyakova, 1981 Badin Formation, Russia, Late Jurassic (Oxfordian/Kimmeridgian)
    - †Tschekardus Vishnyakova, 1981 Koshelevka Formation, Russia, Kungurian
    - †Zoropsocoides Vishnyakova, 1981 Kazankovo-Markinskaya Formation, Russia, Middle Permian (Wordian)
    - †Zoropsocus Tillyard, 1935 Kazankovo-Markinskaya Formation, Russia, Middle Permian (Wordian) Croudace Bay Formation, Australia, Late Permian (Changhsingian), Akkolka Formation, Kazakhstan, Changhsingian
