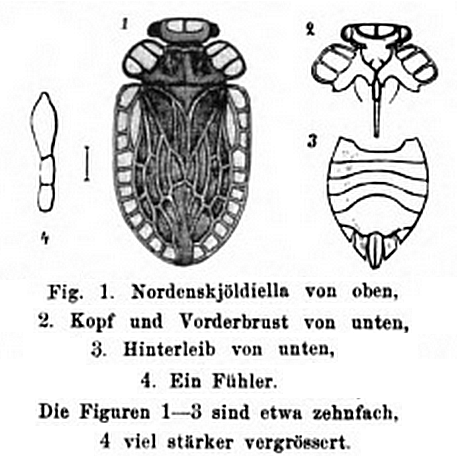

Scientific classification
- Kingdom: Animalia
- Phylum: Arthropoda
- Class: Insecta
- Order: Hemiptera
- Family: Peloridiidae
- Genus: Peloridium; Breddin, 1897

Synonyms
- Nordenskjoldiella Haglund, 1899

= Peloridium =

Genus of true bugs

Peloridium is a genus of moss bugs from southern South America, with two known species.

Peloridium hammoniorum was first described in 1897 by Gustav Breddin from a specimen found at Puerto Toro on Navarin Island in Tierra del Fuego. A second species, Peloridium pomponorum, was described in 2014.

== Species ==
Two species are recognised:

- Peloridium hammoniorum Breddin, 1897
- Peloridium pomponorum Shcherbakov, 2014
