= Patapius =

Scientific classification
- Domain: Eukaryota
- Kingdom: Animalia
- Phylum: Arthropoda
- Class: Insecta
- Order: Hemiptera
- Suborder: Heteroptera
- Family: Leptopodidae
- Genus: Patapius; Horváth, 1912

Genus of true bugs

Patapius is a genus of spiny-legged bugs in the family Leptopodidae. There are about seven described species in Patapius.

== Species ==
These seven species belong to the genus Patapius:

- Patapius africanus Drake & Hoberlandt, 1951
- Patapius angolensis Drake & Hoberlandt, 1951
- Patapius corticalis Linnavuori, 1974
- Patapius integerrimus Linnavuori, 1974
- Patapius sentus Drake & Hoberlandt, 1951
- Patapius spinosus (Rossi, 1790)
- Patapius thaiensis Cobben, 1968
