= Boolaroo Subgroup =

Geologic formation in the Hunter Region of Australia

- Stratigraphic range: late Permian
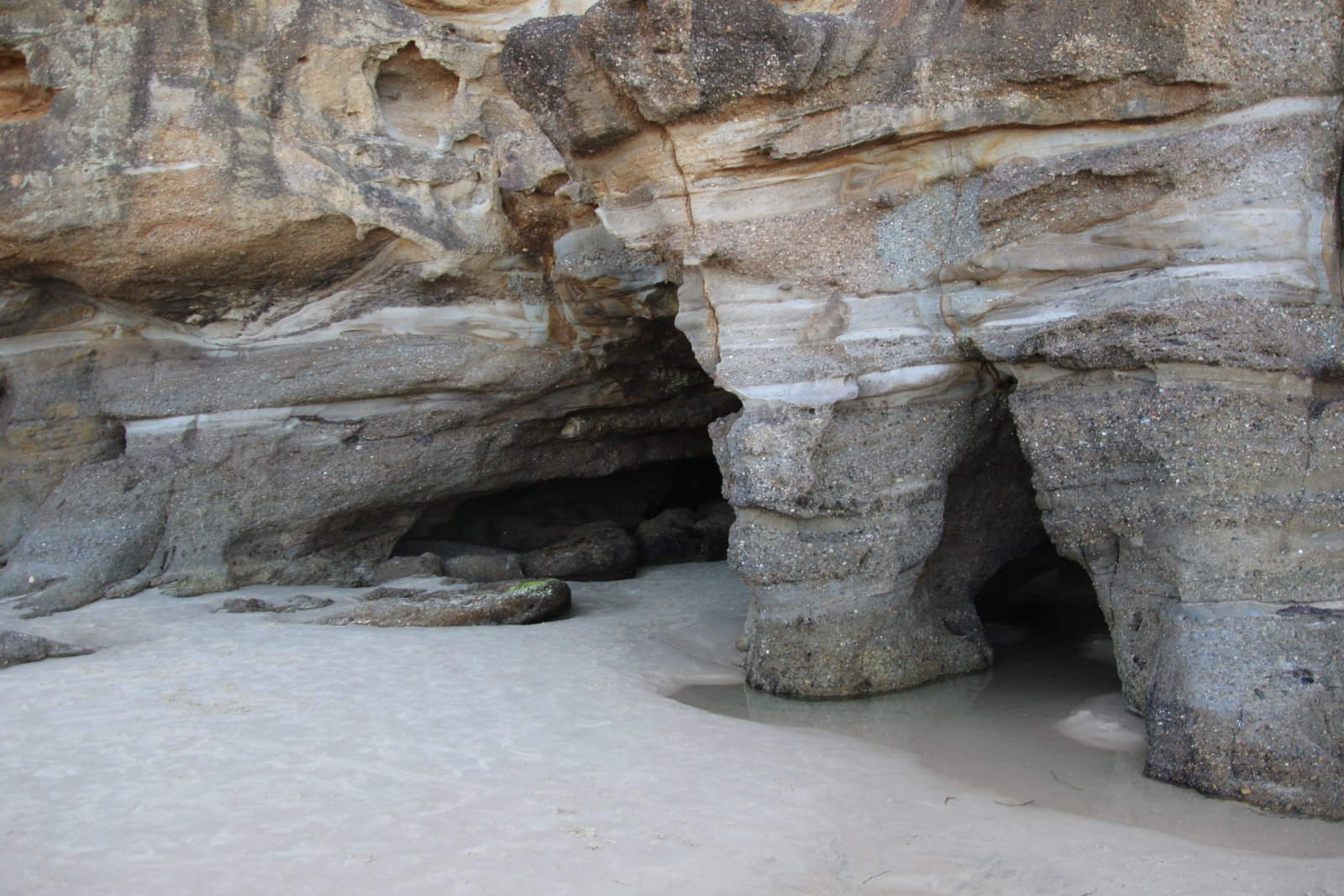
- Caves Beach, New South Wales, Australia
- Type: Geological formation
- Unit of: Newcastle Coal Measures
- Sub-units: many, including Reids Mistake Formation and Croudace Bay Formation
- Underlies: Moon Island Beach Subgroup
- Overlies: Adamstown Subgroup

Lithology
- Primary: sandstone
- Other: conglomerate

Location
- Location: Hunter Region
- Region: New South Wales
- Country: Australia
- Extent: Lachlan Orogen

Type section
- Named for: Boolaroo, New South Wales
- Named by: McKenzie and Britten (1969)
- Country: Australia

Boolaroo Subgroup is a geologic subgroup in the Lachlan Orogen in eastern Australia in the Hunter Region. Formed in the late Permian, it is part of the Newcastle Coal Measures. This formation includes sandstone, conglomerate, tuff, and black coal. Belmont Conglomerate Member, part of the Croudace Bay Formation and a formation of the Boolaroo Subgroup, can be seen at Caves Beach, New South Wales.

== See also ==
- Lachlan Orogen
- Newcastle Coal Measures
- Reids Mistake Formation
- Sydney Basin
