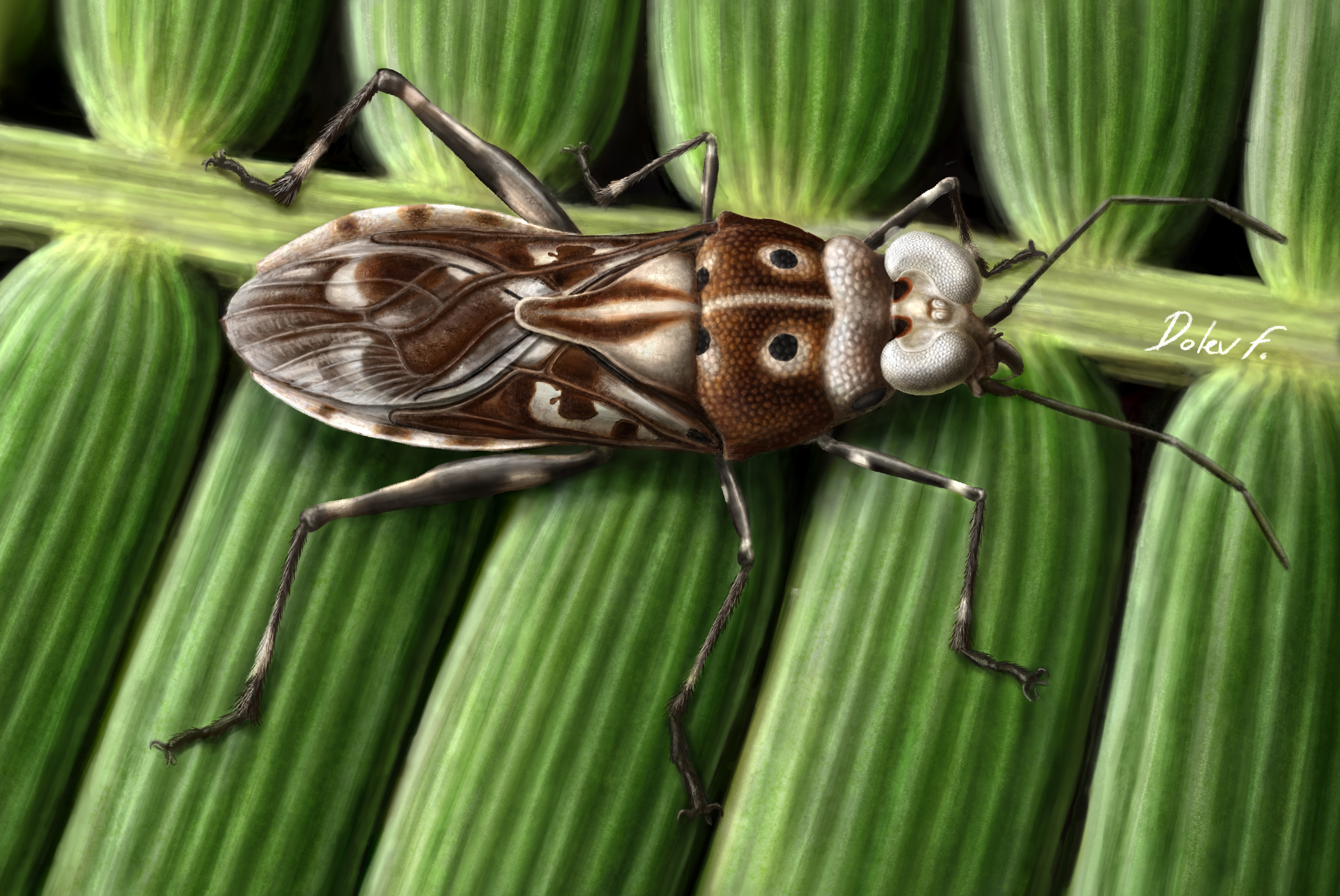
- Miropictopallium coloradmonens reconstruction

Scientific classification
- Kingdom: Animalia
- Phylum: Arthropoda
- Clade: Pancrustacea
- Class: Insecta
- Order: Hemiptera
- Suborder: Heteroptera
- Superfamily: Coreoidea
- Family: †Yuripopovinidae; Azar et al. 2011

Genera
- See text

Synonyms
- Dehiscensicoridae Du, Yao & Ren 2017

= Yuripopovinidae =

Yuripopovinidae Temporal range: Barremian–Cenomanian

Extinct family of true bugs

Yuripopovinidae is an extinct family of Hemipteran true bugs. Member species are known from the Early Cretaceous and early Late Cretaceous of Asia and northern Gondwana. Among the distinguishing characters are "the hemelytral costal vein apically much thickened and pterostigma-like, the corium with two large cells separated by one longitudinal straight vein." Dehiscensicoridae, described from the Yixian Formation of China has been deemed a junior synonym of Yuripopovinidae per Du et al. (2019). The family was named after Russian paleoentomologist Yuri Alexandrovich Popov.

== Genera ==
- †Caulisoculus Zhang & Chen, 2020 Burmese amber, Myanmar, Cenomanian
- †Changirostrus Du, Yao & Ren, 2017 Yixian Formation, China, Aptian
- †Crassiantenninus Du, Yao & Ren, 2017 Yixian Formation, China, Aptian
- †Dehiscensicoris Du, Yao & Ren, 2017 Yixian Formation, China, Aptian
- †Jinjupopovina Sohn & Nam, 2024 Jinju Formation, South Korea, Albian
- †Minuticoris Du, Yao & Ren, 2017 Yixian Formation, China, Aptian
- †Microcaulisoculus Faúndez, 2026 Burmese amber, Myanmar, Cenomanian
- †Miropictopallium Fabrikant & Novoselska, 2024 Burmese amber, Myanmar, Cenomanian
- †Megaoptocoris Zhou et al. 2022 Burmese amber, Myanmar, Cenomanian
- †Pingquanicoris Du, Yao & Ren, 2017 Yixian Formation, China, Aptian
- †Pseusocaulisoculus Kóbora & Roca-Cusachs, 2021 Burmese amber, Myanmar, Cenomanian
- †Reticulatitergum Du et al., 2019 Burmese amber, Myanmar, Cenomanian
- †Tumpectus triporcatus Dai et al., 2024 Burmese amber, Myanmar, Cenomanian
- †Yuripopovina Azar et al., 2011 Lebanese amber, Barremian
