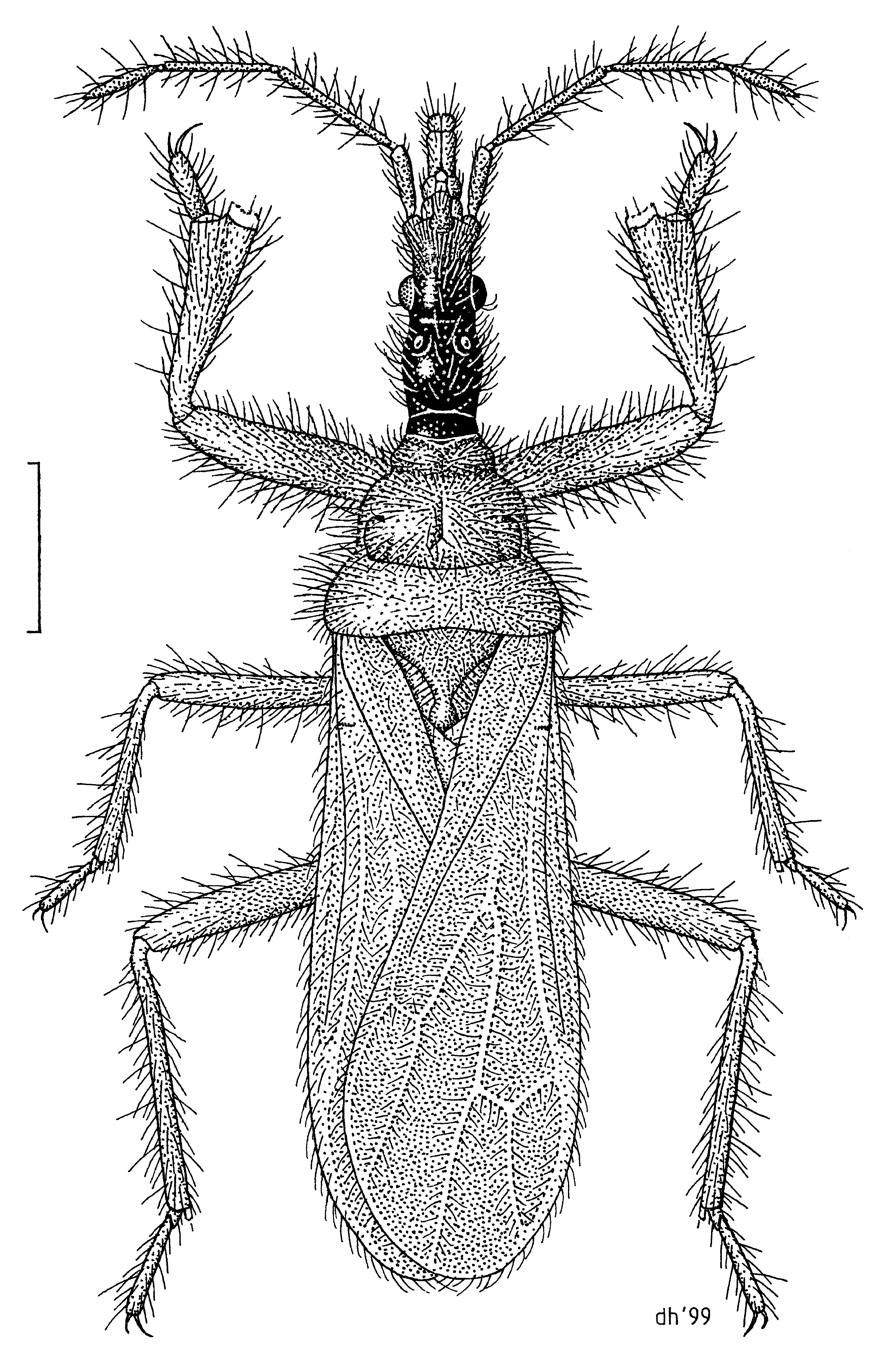
- Systelloderes maclachlani illustrated by Des Helmore

Scientific classification
- Kingdom: Animalia
- Phylum: Arthropoda
- Class: Insecta
- Order: Hemiptera
- Suborder: Heteroptera
- Family: Enicocephalidae
- Genus: Systelloderes; Blanchard, 1852

= Systelloderes =

Genus of true bugs

Systelloderes is a genus of gnat bugs in the family Enicocephalidae. There are about 12 described species in Systelloderes.

== Species ==
These 12 species belong to the genus Systelloderes:

- Systelloderes biceps (Say, 1832)
- Systelloderes crassatus Usinger, 1932
- Systelloderes dorsalis Kritsky
- Systelloderes grandis Kritsky, 1978
- Systelloderes inusitatus Drake & Harris, 1927
- Systelloderes iowensis Drake & Harris, 1927
- Systelloderes lateralis Kritsky, 1978
- Systelloderes lateralus Kritsky
- Systelloderes moschatus Blanchard, 1852
- Systelloderes notialis Woodward, 1956
- Systelloderes terrenus Drake & Harris
- Systelloderes utukhengal Stys
