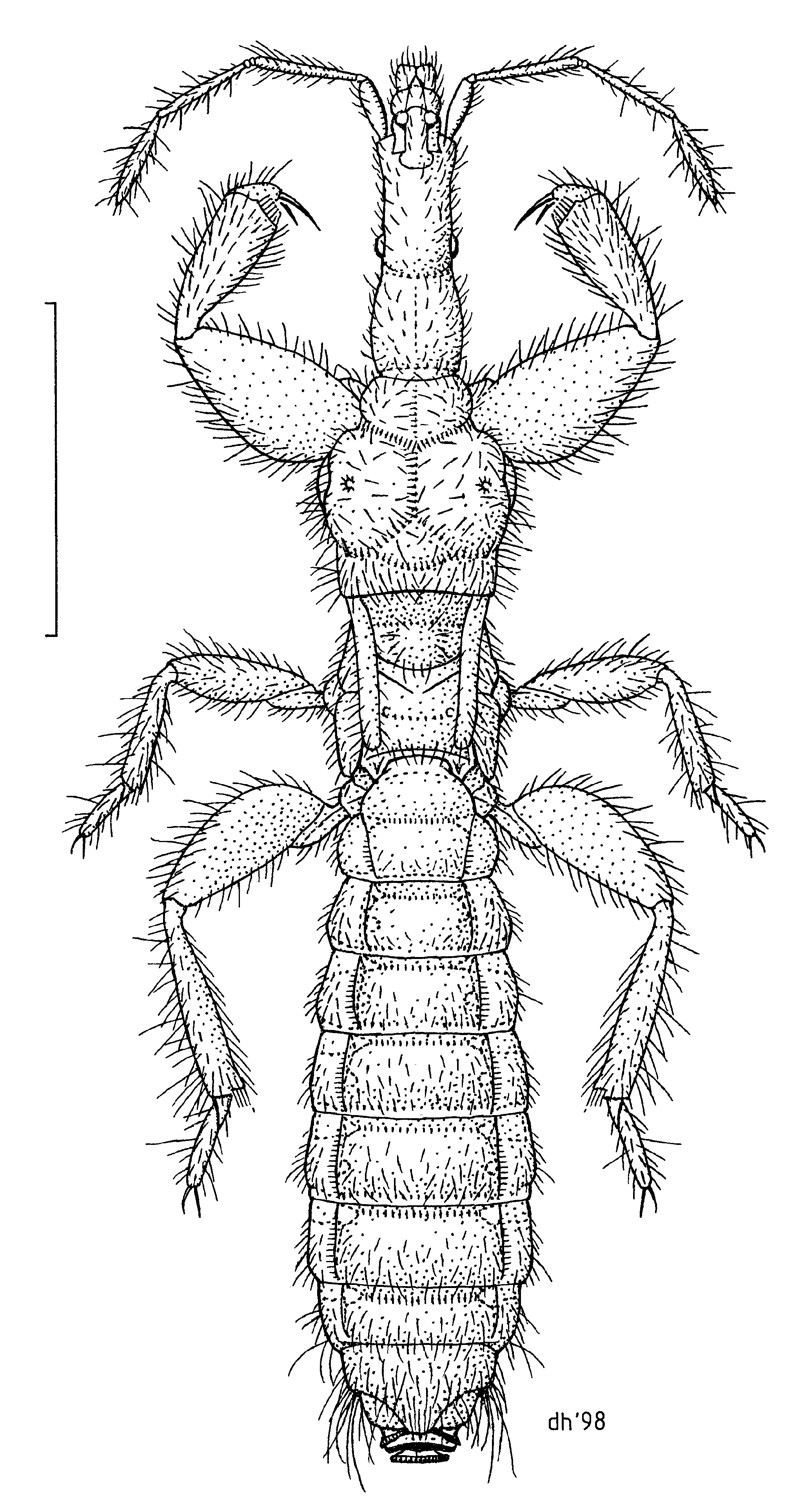
- Phthirocoris magnus female

Scientific classification
- Kingdom: Animalia
- Phylum: Arthropoda
- Clade: Pancrustacea
- Class: Insecta
- Order: Hemiptera
- Suborder: Heteroptera
- Infraorder: Enicocephalomorpha
- Superfamily: Enicocephaloidea; Stål, 1860

Families
- Enicocephalidae; Aenictopecheidae †Enicocephalinus

= Enicocephaloidea =

Enicocephaloidea Temporal range: Barremian–Recent

Superfamily of true bugs

Enicocephaloidea is a sole superfamily within the infraorder Enicocephalomorpha of the hemipteran suborder Heteroptera ("true bugs"). The group was formerly thought to be related to the Reduviidae because of similarities in head structure but they are now considered different enough from other Heteroptera to constitute a separate infraorder and represents a sister group of the Leptopodomorpha. They are predaceous and some species are known to swarm but little is known of their life history. A few species of enicocephalids are known to shed their wings before entering the surface of subsoil.
