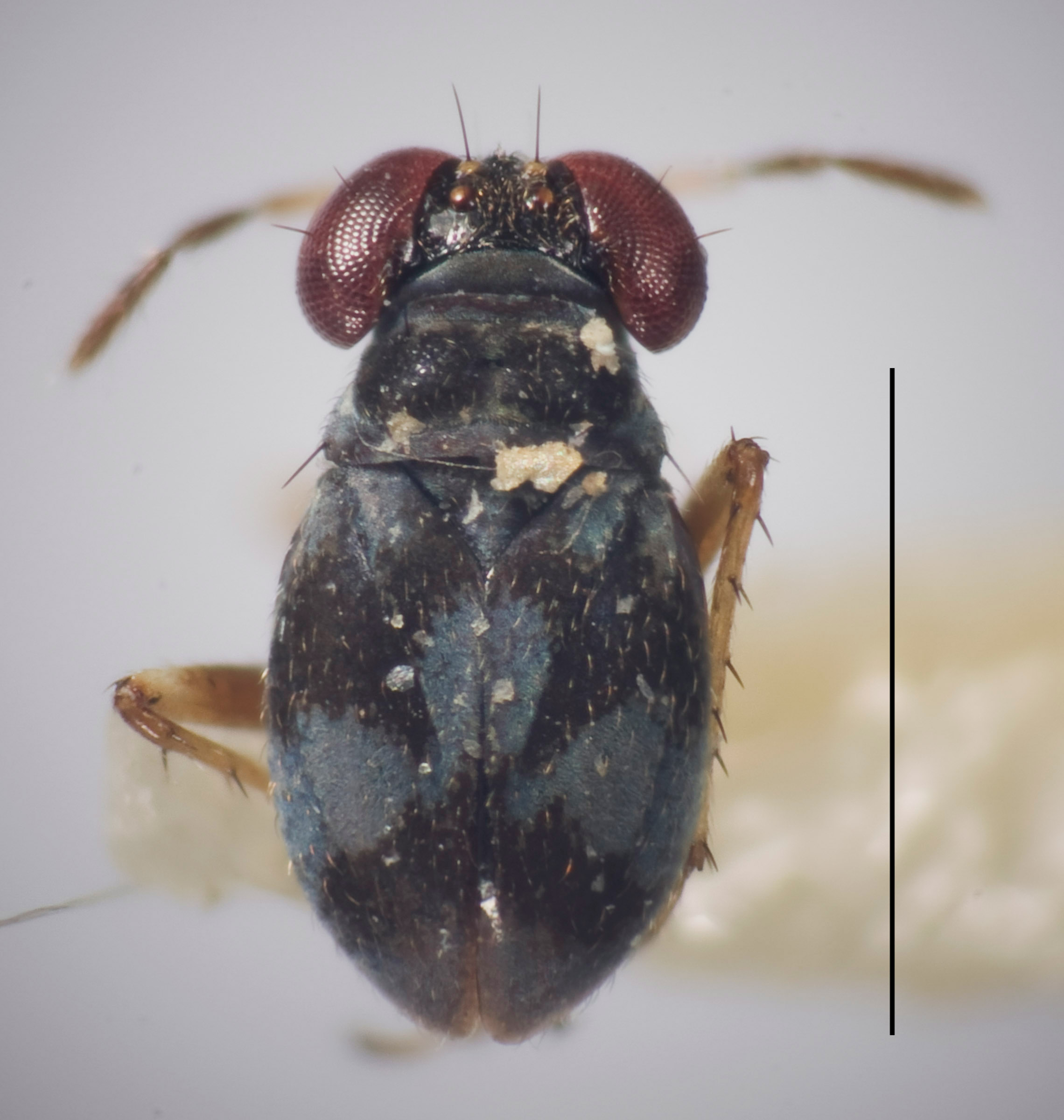
- Corallocoris nauruensis

Scientific classification
- Domain: Eukaryota
- Kingdom: Animalia
- Phylum: Arthropoda
- Class: Insecta
- Order: Hemiptera
- Suborder: Heteroptera
- Infraorder: Leptopodomorpha
- Family: Omaniidae
- Genus: Corallocoris; Cobben, 1970

= Corallocoris =

Genus of true bugs

Corallocoris is a genus of bugs, in the infraorder Leptopodomorpha. Species have been recorded from SE Asia, Japan, Australia and Oceania; this is one of only two genera in the family Omaniidae (sometimes called "intertidal dwarf bugs") and previously some species were placed in Omania.

== Species ==
The Global Biodiversity Information Facility lists:

1. Corallocoris aldabrae Cobben, 1987
2. Corallocoris marksae (Woodward, 1958)
3. Corallocoris nauruensis (Herring & Chapman, 1967)
4. Corallocoris satoi (Miyamoto, 1963)
5. Corallocoris xishaensis Luo, Wang & Chen, 2022
