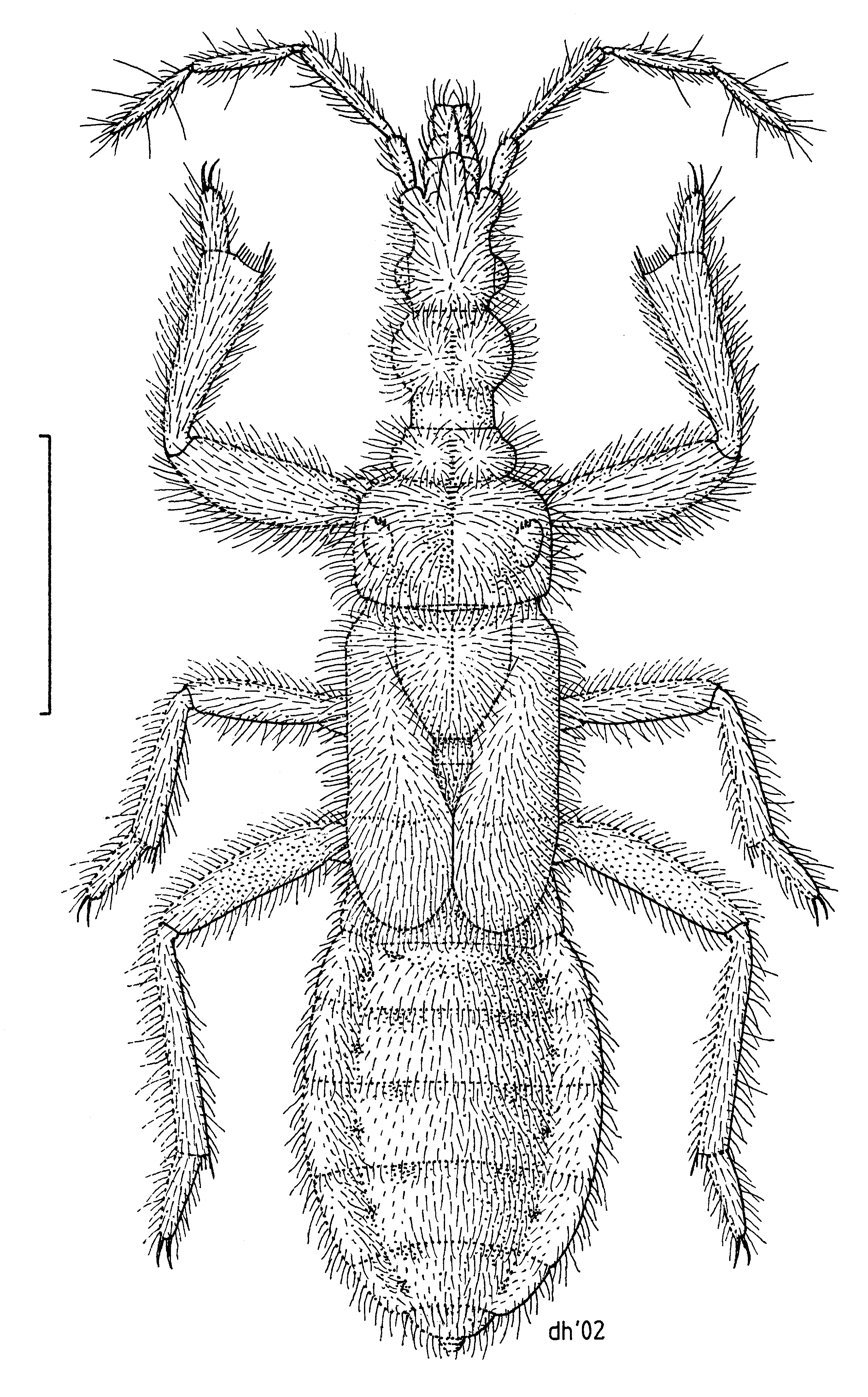
- Aenictocoris powelli

Scientific classification
- Kingdom: Animalia
- Phylum: Arthropoda
- Class: Insecta
- Order: Hemiptera
- Suborder: Heteroptera
- Superfamily: Enicocephaloidea
- Family: Aenictopecheidae; Usinger, 1932

= Aenictopecheidae =

Aenictopecheidae Temporal range: Cenomanian–Recent

Family of true bugs

Aenictopecheidae is a rare family of insects occurring worldwide but containing only a few species, including a single American species, Boreostolus americanus. This species lives under large, flat stones and sandy substrates along mountain streams in Oregon, Washington, and Colorado. It is 5 mm long and occurs in both the macropterous and brachypterous condition. It is assumed to be predaceous.

== Genera ==
- Aenictocoris Woodward, 1956
- Aenictopechys Breddin, 1905
- Australostolus Stys, 1980
- Boreostolus Wygodzinsky & Stys, 1970
- †Cretocephalus Luo & Xie, 2022 (Cenomanian, Burmese Amber, Myanmar)
- Gamostolus Bergroth, 1927
- Lomagostus Villiers, 1958
- Maoristolus Woodward, 1956
- Murphyanella Wygodzinsky & Stys, 1982
- Nymphocoris Woodward, 1956
- Timahocoris Wygodzinsky & Stys, 1982
- Tornocrusus Kritsky, 1977
