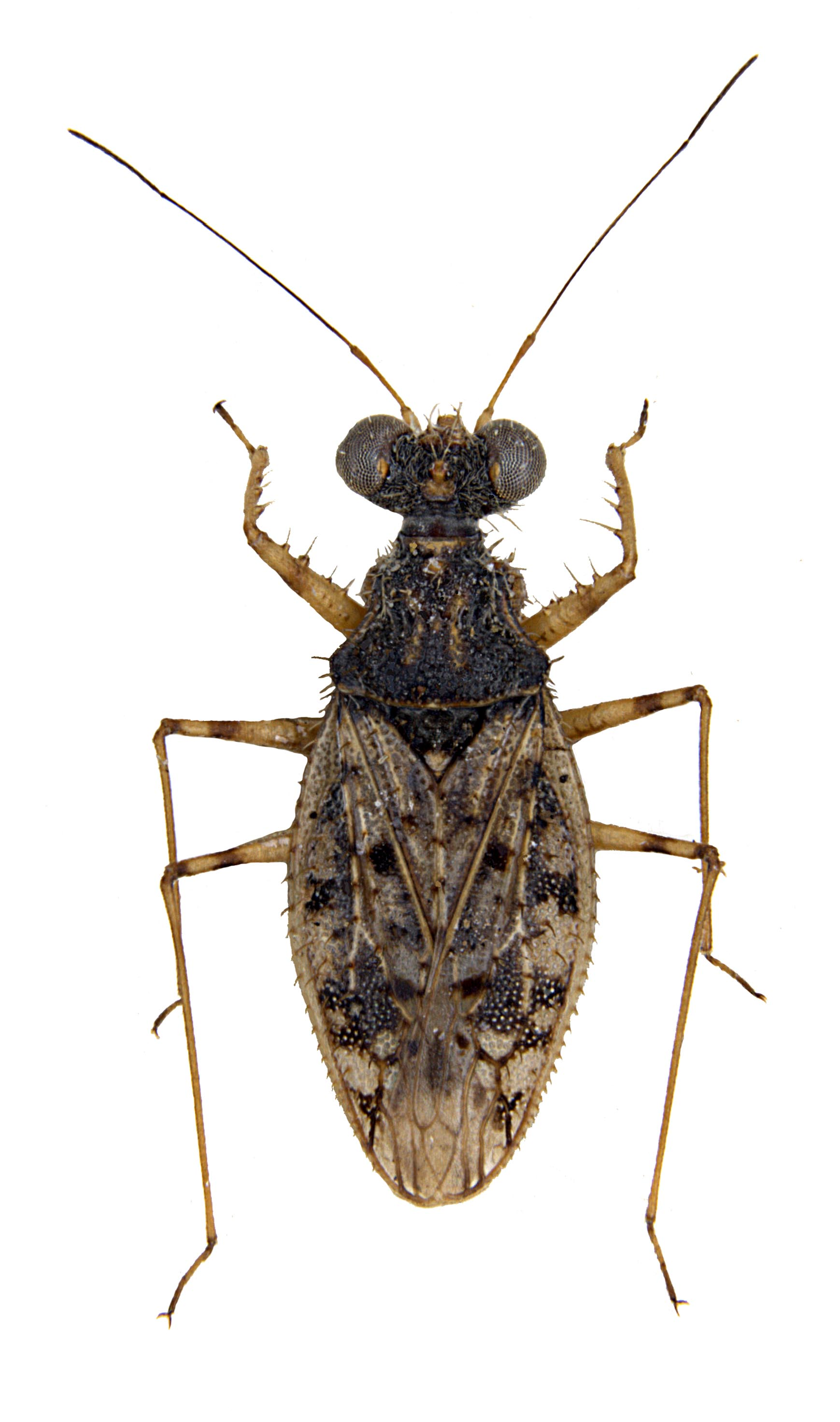
- Leptopus marmoratus

Scientific classification
- Kingdom: Animalia
- Phylum: Arthropoda
- Class: Insecta
- Order: Hemiptera
- Suborder: Heteroptera
- Infraorder: Leptopodomorpha
- Family: Leptopodidae; Brullé, 1836

= Leptopodidae =

Leptopodidae Temporal range: Cenomanian–Recent

Family of true bugs

Leptopodidae is a family of spiny-legged bugs in the order Hemiptera. There are about 15 genera and more than 40 described species in Leptopodidae.

== Genera ==
These 17 genera belong to the family Leptopodidae:

- Erianotoides J.Polhemus & D.Polhemus, 1991
- Erianotus Fieber, 1861
- Lahima Linnavuori & Van Harten, 2002-22
- Leotichius Distant, 1904
- Leptopoides J.Polhemus & D.Polhemus, 1991-01
- Leptopus Latreille, 1809
- Martiniola Horváth, 1911
- Patapius Horváth, 1912
- Saldolepta Schuh & J.Polhemus, 1980
- Valleriola Distant, 1904
- † Archaesalepta Grimaldi & Engel, 2013 Cambay amber, India, Eocene
- † Cretaceomira McKellar & Engel, 2014 Canadian amber, Campanian
- † Cretaleptus Sun and Chen 2020 Burmese amber, Myanmar, Cenomanian
- † Leptosalda Cobben, 1971 Dominican amber, Mexican amber, Miocene
- † Macrolepta Yu, Zhuo & Chen, 2023 Burmese amber, Myanmar, Cenomanian
- † Palaeoleptus Poinar 2009 Burmese amber, Myanmar, Cenomanian
- † Palaeotanyrhina Poinar, Brown & Kóbor 2009 Burmese amber, Myanmar, Cenomanian
