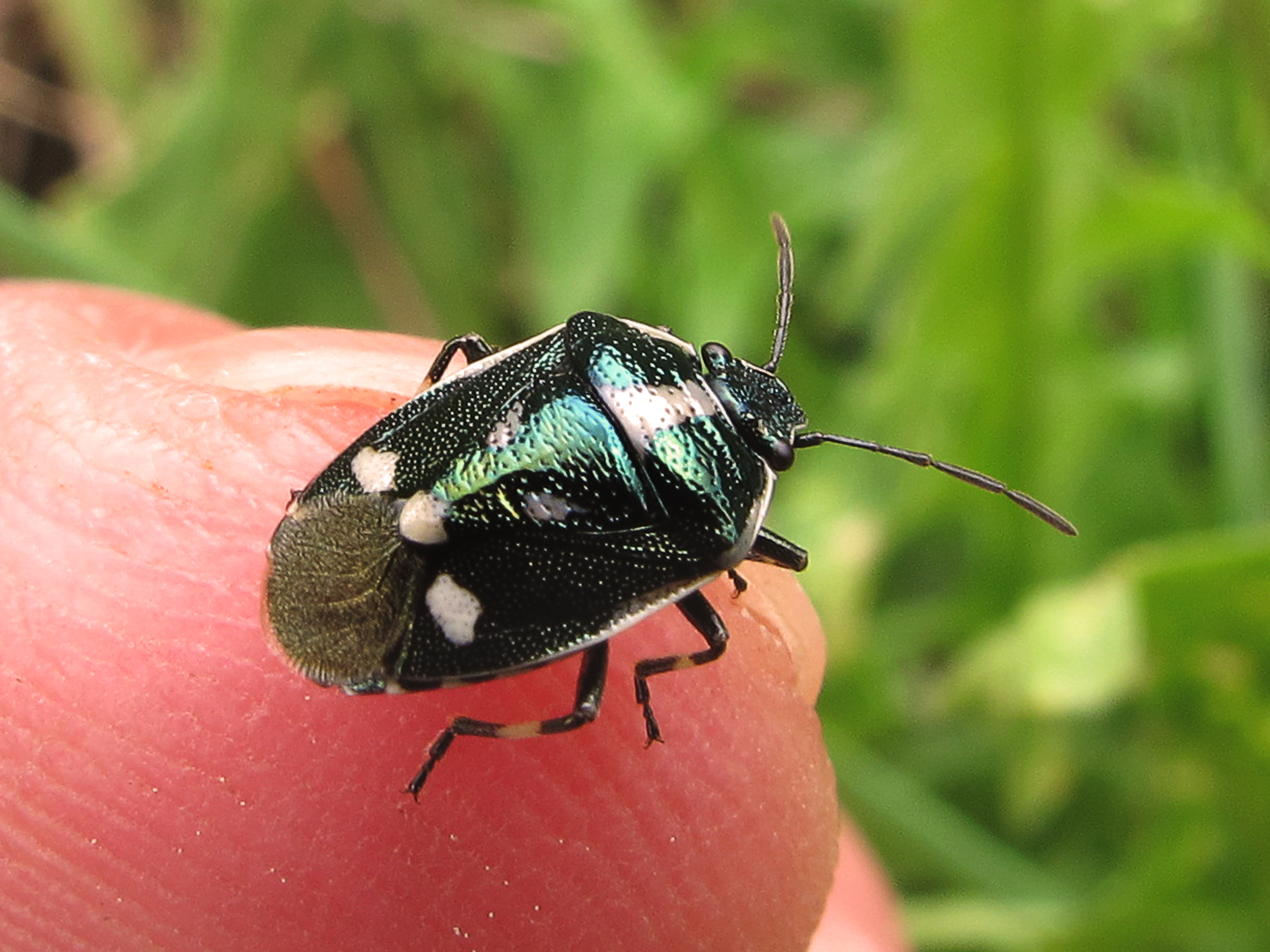
- Eurydema oleracea, a species in the family Pentatomidae

Scientific classification
- Domain: Eukaryota
- Kingdom: Animalia
- Phylum: Arthropoda
- Class: Insecta
- Order: Hemiptera
- Suborder: Prosorrhyncha

Infraorders
- Peloridiomorpha; Heteroptera - (unranked)

= Prosorrhyncha =

Order of true bugs

The name Prosorrhyncha is a name (proposed by Sorensen et al. 1995) for a suborder of Hemiptera, comprising a grouping of the traditional taxon "Heteroptera" plus its sister taxon, the family Peloridiidae (often classified as a suborder itself). There is no agreement on the status of this taxon, as there are two competing classifications regarding this branch of the Hemiptera; while some hemipterists follow this classification (link below), it has by no means been accepted universally. See the Heteroptera article for the detailed discussion, and a comparison of the two taxoboxes.

Note that there is a "conflict within the conflict" regarding the use of the name "Prosorrhyncha", as it is not the oldest name suggested for this particular group of taxa; the name "Heteropteroidea" (Schlee 1969) is older, as is "Heteropterodea" (Zrzavy 1992). However, as the Code of Nomenclature does not regulate taxon names above the rank of family, there is no actual rule that the oldest name must be given precedence. Prosorrhyncha is therefore given preference over the other names specifically because the suffixes of the older names are conventionally reserved for taxonomic ranks other than suborder, thus their use would create internal conflict and confusion (e.g., the ending "-oidea" is used for the rank of superfamily, meaning that if "Heteropteroidea" were adopted, it would include, within it, groups such as Pentatomoidea, Lygaeoidea, etc.).
