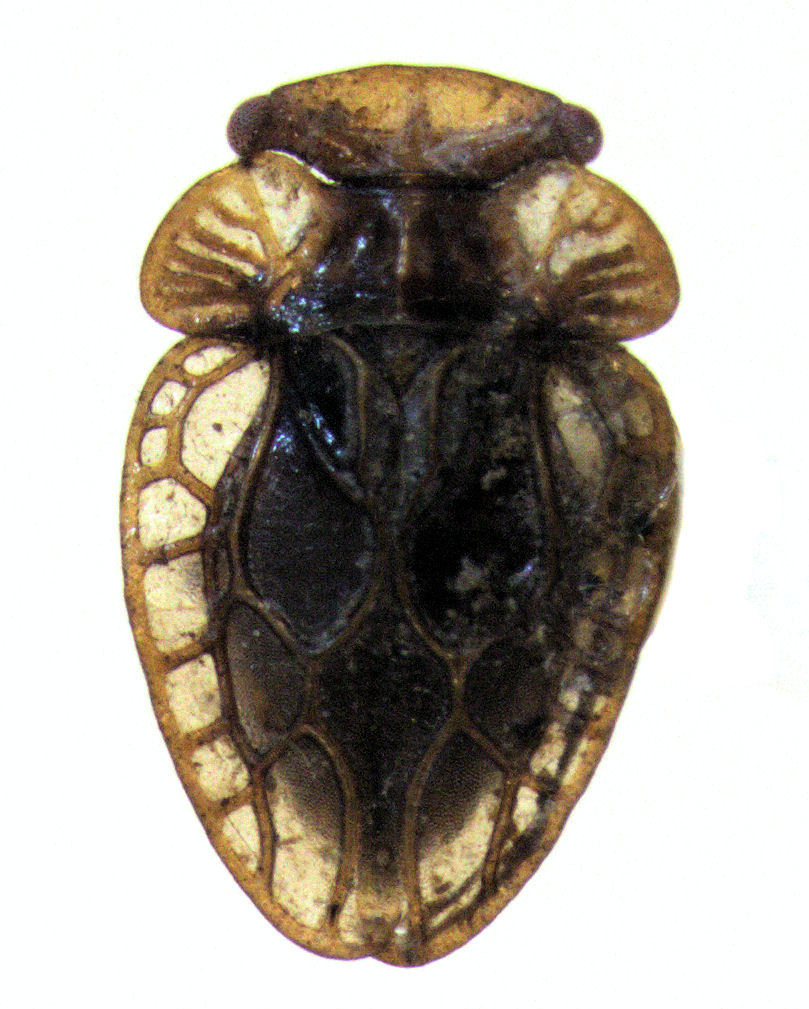
- Xenophyes rhachilophus
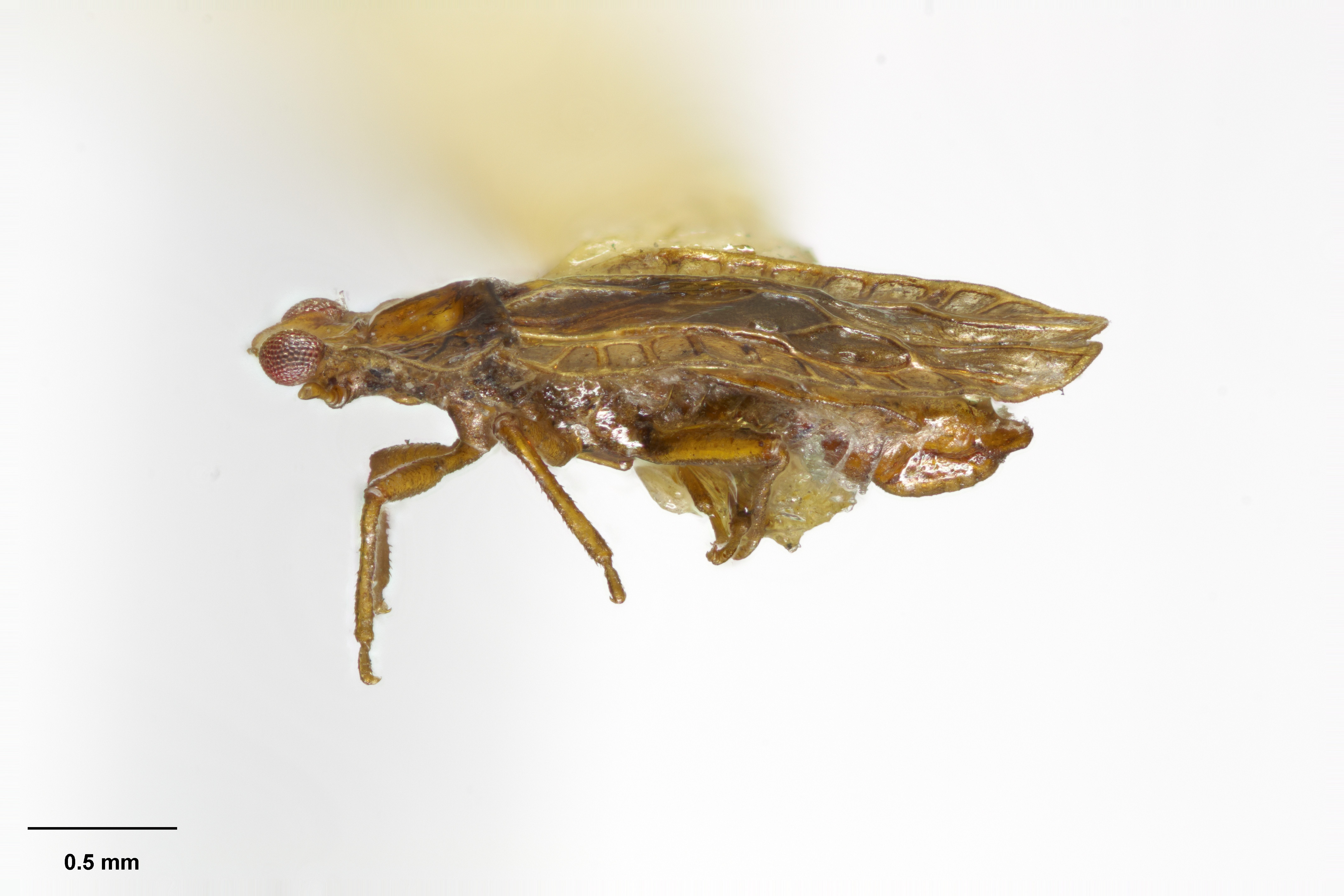
- Xenophyes forsteri

Scientific classification
- Kingdom: Animalia
- Phylum: Arthropoda
- Clade: Pancrustacea
- Class: Insecta
- Order: Hemiptera
- Suborder: Coleorrhyncha
- Superfamily: Peloridioidea
- Family: Peloridiidae; Breddin, 1897

= Peloridiidae =

Family of true bugs

The Peloridiidae or moss bugs are a family of true bugs, comprising eighteen genera and thirty-four species. They are small, ranging in length from 2 to 4 mm, rarely seen, peculiarly lumpy, flattened bugs found in Patagonia (Argentina and Chile), New Zealand, eastern Australia, Lord Howe Island, and New Caledonia. Peloridiids are found amongst mosses and liverworts, commonly in association with southern beech forests. They have become known as moss bugs for their habit of feeding on mosses. They mostly feed on moss rhizoids, and also on wood-destroying fungi and lichens. Except for Peloridium hammoniorum, all Peloridiidae species are flightless. (Note: The South American Peloridiidae Peloridium hammoniorum Breddin, 1897 has both a winged and a wingless form.) Their present distribution suggests they have existed since before the breakup of Gondwana. They are the only living members of the suborder Coleorrhyncha, which first appeared in the Upper Permian, over 250 million years ago.

== Evolution ==
Peloridiidae are the only extant (Note: Other families in the Coleorrhyncha are preserved in the fossil record, notably the early Progonocimicidae, and the later Karabasiidae and Hoploridiidae.) family in the suborder Coleorrhyncha. Historically the Peloridiidae and their fossil kin were assigned to a variety of orders. In 1929 they were placed in the Homoptera, in 1962 they were placed in the Auchenorrhyncha, in 1963 they were placed in the Cicadomorpha, and in 1997 they were placed in Fulgoromorpha. However, essentially all sources since 1969 are in consensus that the Peloridiidae belong in Coleorrhyncha and that Coleorrhyncha is a sister group to the Heteroptera.

The question remains whether this affinity between the Coleorrhyncha and the Heteroptera necessitates the imposition of a suborder between them and the order Hemiptera. In 1995 Sorensen proposed the name Prosorrhyncha for such a suborder. (See the Heteroptera and Prosorrhyncha pages for a discussion).

The oldest members of Coleorrhyncha are known from the Upper Permian, over 250 million years ago, assigned to the family Progonocimicidae. It is likely that Progonocimicidae is paraphyletic, with other families of Coleorrhyncha derived from it. The closest relatives of Peloridiidae are the Hoploridiidae from the Early Cretaceous of Asia.

== Genera ==
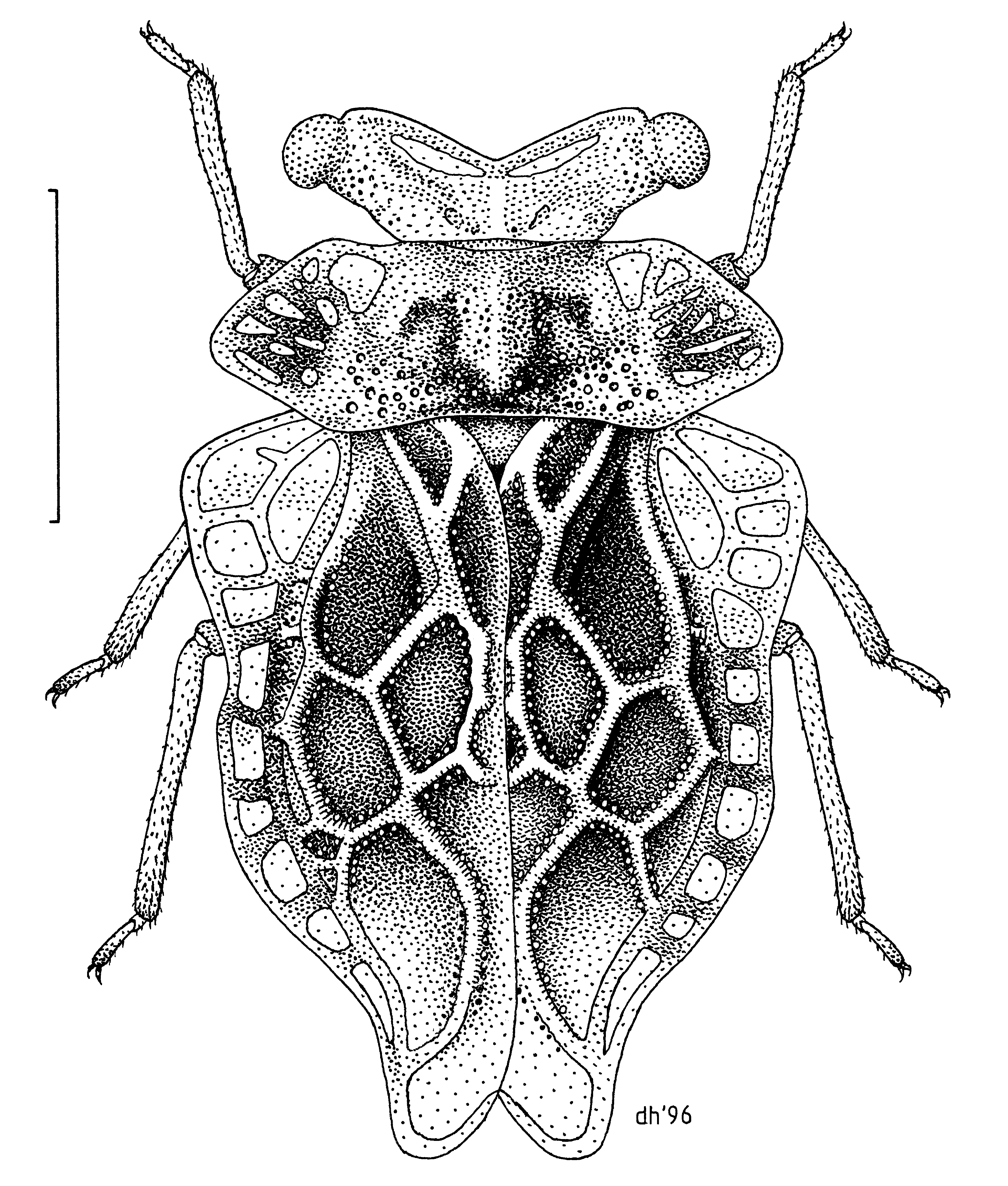
Oiophysa distincta

- Craspedophysa Burckhardt, 2009
- Hackeriella Evans, 1972
- Hemiodoecellus Evans, 1959
- Hemiodoecus China, 1924
- Hemiowoodwardia Evans, 1972
- Howeria Evans, 1959
- Idophysa Burckhardt, 2009
- Kuscheloides Evans, 1982
- Oiophysa Drake & Salmon, 1950
- Oiophysella Evans, 1982
- Pantinia China, 1962
- Peloridium Breddin, 1897
- Peloridora China, 1955
- Peltophysa Burckhardt, 2009
- Rhacophysa Burckhardt, 2009
- Xenophyes Bergroth, 1924
- Xenophysella Evans, 1982

== Other reading ==
- Bergroth, Ernst Evald (1924). "A new genus of Peloridiidae from New Zealand". Entomologist's Monthly Magazine. 60: 178–181.
- Burckhardt, Daniel (2010). "Mooswanzen–Peloridiidae (Hemiptera, Coleorrhyncha), eine enigmatische Insektengruppe" (PDF). Entomologica Austriaca (in German). 17: 9–22. Archived from the original (PDF) on 20 December 2013.
- Evans, John William (1982). "A review of present knowledge of the family Peloridiidae and new genera and new species from New Zealand and New Caledonia (Hemiptera: Insecta)" (PDF). Records of the Australian Museum. 34 (5): 381–406. doi:10.3853/j.0067-1975.34.1982.296. Archived (PDF) from the original on 5 December 2011.
- Hoch, H.; Deckert, J.; Wessel, A. (2006). "Vibrational signalling in a Gondwanan relict insect (Hemiptera: Coleorrhyncha: Peloridiidae)". Biology Letters. 2 (2): 222–224. doi:10.1098/rsbl.2006.0451. PMC 1618915. PMID 17148367.
- Larivière, Marie-Claude; Burckhardt, Daniel & Larochelle, André (2011). Peloridiidae (Insecta: Hemiptera: Coleorrhyncha). Fauna of New Zealand, No. 67 (in English and Māori). Lincoln, Canterbury, New Zealand: Manaaki Whenua Press, Landcare Research. ISBN 978-0-478-34730-2. Abstract
- Kuechler, Stefan Martin; et al. (2013). "Diversity of bacterial endosymbionts and bacteria–host co‐evolution in Gondwanan relict moss bugs (Hemiptera: Coleorrhyncha: Peloridiidae)". Environmental Microbiology. 15 (7): 2031–2042. doi:10.1111/1462-2920.12101. PMID 23452253.
