= Xenophysella =

Scientific classification
- Domain: Eukaryota
- Kingdom: Animalia
- Phylum: Arthropoda
- Class: Insecta
- Order: Hemiptera
- Superfamily: Peloridioidea
- Family: Peloridiidae
- Genus: Xenophysella; Evans, 1982

Genus of true bugs

Xenophysella is a genus of moss bug (Peloridiidae). The type species is Xenophysella stewartensis, found only on Stewart Island, off New Zealand.

== Species ==
- Xenophysella greensladeae Burckhardt, 2009
- Xenophysella stewartensis Woodward, 1952 (=Xenophysella pegasusensis Evans, 1982)

== Other reading ==
- "Xenophysella". The Encyclopedia of Life.
- Burckhardt, Daniel (2009). "Taxonomy and phylogeny of the Gondwanan moss bugs or Peloridiidae (Hemiptera, Coleorrhyncha)". Deutsche Entomologische Zeitschrift. 56 (2): 173–235. doi:10.1002/mmnd.200900019.
