= Reids Mistake Formation =

- Stratigraphic range: Lopingian
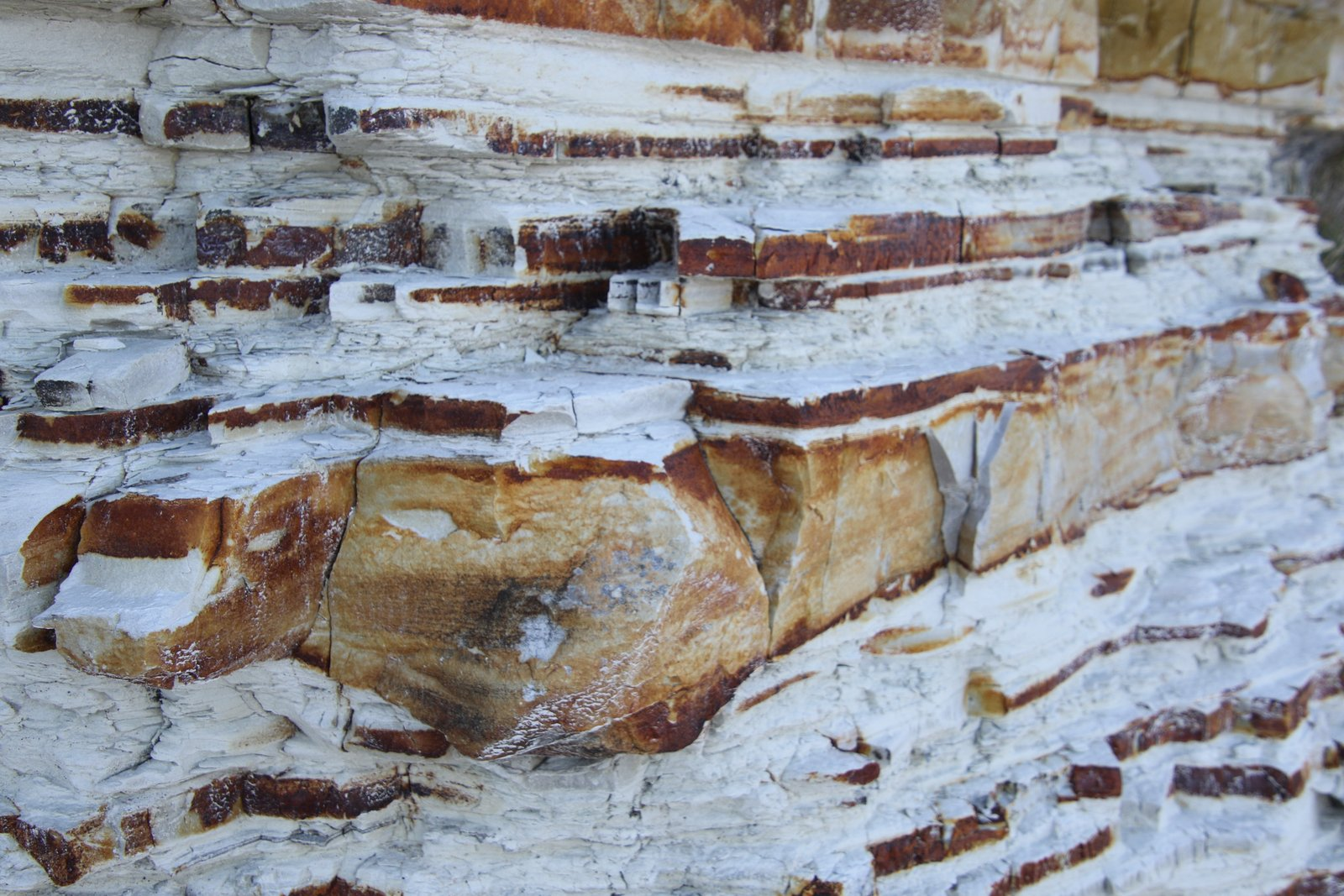
- Swansea, New South Wales, Australia
- Type: Geological formation
- Unit of: Newcastle Coal Measures
- Underlies: Hartley Hill Coal

Lithology
- Primary: conglomerate
- Other: tuff

Location
- Location: Hunter Region
- Region: New South Wales
- Country: Australia
- Extent: Sydney Basin

Type section
- Named for: William Reid, ship's captain
- Country: Australia

Reids Mistake Formation is a geologic formation in the Sydney Basin in eastern Australia. It may be seen at the Swansea Headland Petrified Forest, near Swansea, New South Wales. Formed in the late Permian, it is part of the Boolaroo Subgroup of the Newcastle Coal Measures.

Named after William Reid, who mistook the opening of Lake Macquarie for the Hunter River to the north. Within the tuff of this formation, west facing, fossilized remnants of Glossopteris trees can be seen in the wave cut platform. Reids Mistake Formation consists of conglomerate, sandstone, siltstone, claystone, and tuff.

== See also ==
- Sydney Basin
- Newcastle Coal Measures
