= Craspedophysa =

Scientific classification
- Domain: Eukaryota
- Kingdom: Animalia
- Phylum: Arthropoda
- Class: Insecta
- Order: Hemiptera
- Family: Peloridiidae
- Genus: Craspedophysa; Burckhardt, 2009
- Species: C. monteithi

Binomial name
- Craspedophysa monteithi Burckhardt, 2009

Species of true bug

Craspedophysa monteithi is a moss bug, the only confirmed, extant species in the genus Craspedophysa. Craspedophysa monteithi is found in northern Queensland, Australia. It lacks the ancestral cephalic areolae (raised spots on the head) found in some Peloridiidae.
