= Permothrips =

Permothrips Temporal range: Early Permian, 272.5–268.0 Ma

Scientific classification
- Domain: Eukaryota
- Kingdom: Animalia
- Phylum: Arthropoda
- Class: Insecta
- Order: Thysanoptera
- Family: Archescytinidae
- Genus: †Permothrips; Martynov, 1935

Type species
- †Permothrips longipennis Martynov, 1935

Extinct genus of thrip

Permothrips is an extinct genus of thrips from the Archescytinidae family that is notable for being one of the oldest records of thrips to date. The type species (P. longipennis) was described by A. V. Martynov in 1935 on the basis of PIN 2506/4, a single exoskeleton found in Sedy, Russia. It was probably a fungus feeding ancestor of the Mesozoic thrips.
