= Hemiodoecus =

Scientific classification
- Domain: Eukaryota
- Kingdom: Animalia
- Phylum: Arthropoda
- Class: Insecta
- Order: Hemiptera
- Superfamily: Peloridioidea
- Family: Peloridiidae
- Genus: Hemiodoecus; China, 1924

Genus of true bugs

Hemiodoecus is a genus of moss bug. It was first identified from a northwestern Tasmania specimen by William Edward China in 1924, and Hemiodoecus leai became the type species. In 1982, Evans concluded that Hemiodoecus was, of known genera, the earliest evolved Australian genus of the Peloridiidae, based upon morphology and distribution. He further suggested that it gave rise to the genera Hemiowoodwardia and Hackeriella, both of which he had originally classified as Hemiodoecus.

== Species ==
=== Accepted species ===
- Hemiodoecus crassus Burckhardt, 2009 Australia
- Hemiodoecus acutus Burckhardt, 2009 Australia
- Hemiodoecus leai China, 1924 Tasmania

=== Other species named ===
- Hemiodoecus donnae Woodward, 1956 is a junior synonym of Hemiodoecellus fidefis
- Hemiodoecus fidefis Evans is now Hemiodoecellus fidefis
- Hemiodoecus veitchi Hacker, 1932 is now Hackeriella veitchi
- Hemiodoecus wilsoni Evans, 1936 is now Hemiowoodwardia wilsoni
