= Pavel Štys =

Czech entomologist and professor

Pavel Štys (8 December 1933 – 24 August 2018) was a Czech entomologist who specialized mainly in the Heteroptera and a professor of zoology at Charles University, Prague.

Štys was born to Ludmila (1896–1976) and Jaroslav (1897–1963) Štys in a farming family in South Bohemia. His uncle was a co-owner of an optical instrument manufacturer Srb & Štys. He was educated at Vančurovo Reálné Gymnasium (high school) before joining Charles University, Prague, graduating in 1957. He received a C.Sc.(equivalent to a Ph.D.) degree in 1966 and joined the faculty at the university. He became a professor of entomology in 1993 and became head of the zoology department in 1995. He was also a visiting professor at several universities.
