= Newcastle Coal Measures =

- Stratigraphic range: Lopingian (Wuchiapingian); ~255.65–255.08 Ma
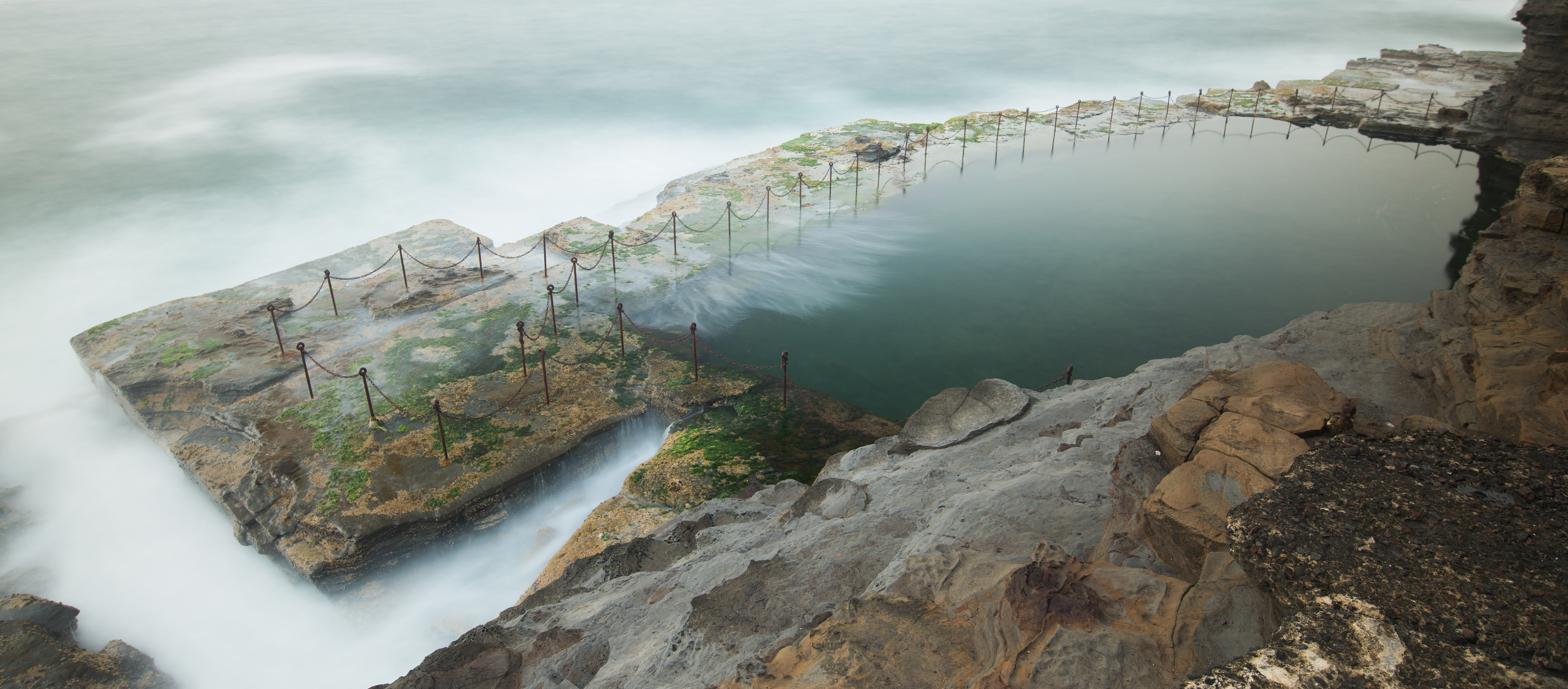
- the Bogey Hole, Newcastle
- Type: Geological formation
- Sub-units: Lambton Subgroup, Adamstown Subgroup, Boolaroo Subgroup, Moon Island Beach Subgroup
- Thickness: up to 1,200 metres (3,940 ft)

Lithology
- Primary: Sandstone, Shale, Tuff,
- Other: Coal, conglomerate, claystone

Location
- Region: Hunter Region
- Country: Australia

Type section
- Named for: Newcastle, New South Wales

Newcastle Coal Measures is a major geologic group located in the Sydney Basin of New South Wales, Australia. This stratum is up to 1,200 metres (3,900 ft) thick, consisting of four formations and three tuff beds which separate the formations, in ascending order: Lambton Formation, Nobbys Tuff, Adamstown Formation, Warners Bay Tuff, Boolaroo Formation, Awaba Tuff, and Moon Island Beach formations, although some papers designate the formations as subgroups, and there is a proposal to lump the middle two into the Lambton Subgroup based on U-Pb zircon results from tuff marker beds, which indicate the influence of magma while the sediments were deposited, dating to approximately 255.65 to 255.08, a roughly 570,000 year span, not long before the Permian–Triassic extinction event. The currently established age is between 255 to 252.16 Ma. This formation includes claystone, coal seams, tuffaceous claystone, siltstone, sandstone, and conglomerate.

== See also ==
- Sydney Basin
- Croudace Bay Formation
- Reids Mistake Formation
