= Progonocimicidae =

Progonocimicidae Temporal range: Changhsingian–Cenomanian

Scientific classification
- Kingdom: Animalia
- Phylum: Arthropoda
- Clade: Pancrustacea
- Class: Insecta
- Order: Hemiptera
- Suborder: Coleorrhyncha
- Family: †Progonocimicidae; Handlirsch, 1906

Extinct family of true bugs

The Progonocimicidae are an extinct family of true bugs in the suborder Coleorrhyncha. Progonocimicidae fossils have been found in Europe, Asia, Australia, and South America.

Families preserved in the fossil record of Coleorrhyncha include the early Progonocimicidae, and the later Karabasiidae and Hoploridiidae. The only extant family in Coleorrhyncha is Peloridiidae. The family is thought to have evolved from the Permian Ingruidae.

== Genera ==
These 27 genera belong to the family Progonocimicidae:

- †subfamily Cicadocorinae Bekker-Migdisova 1958
  - † Absoluta Becker-Migdisova, 1962 Dzhil Formation, Kyrgyzstan, Hettangian
  - † Archicercopis Handlirsch, 1939 Green Series, Germany, Toarcian
  - † Cicadocoris Becker-Migdisova, 1958 Dzhil Formation, Kyrgyzstan, Hettangian Abasheva Formation, Russia, Pliensbachian, Sagul Formation, Kyrgyzstan, Toarcian, Itat Formation, Russia, Bajocian/Bathonian Daohugou, China, Callovian Ichetuy Formation, Russia, Oxfordian, Kalgan Formation, Russia, Kimmeridgian
  - †Gakasha Jiang et al. 2018 Burmese amber, Myanmar, Cenomanian
  - † Ilahulgabalus Szwedo, Azar & Ziade, 2011 Lebanese amber, Barremian
  - † Ildavia Popov, 1993 Weald Clay, United Kingdom, Hauterivian
  - †Mesocimex Hong 1983 Daohugou, Haifanggou Formation, China, Callovian
  - †Olgamartynovia Becker-Migdisova 1958 Dzhil Formation, Kyrgyzstan, Hettangian Abasheva Formation, Russia, Pliensbachian, Sagul Formation, Kyrgyzstan, Toarcian, Itat Formation, Russia, Bajocian/Bathonian Daohugou, China, Callovian Ichetuy Formation, Russia, Oxfordian, Kalgan Formation, Russia, Kimmeridgian
  - † Onokhoia Popov, 1988 Godymboyskaya Formation, Russia, Aptian
  - † Valdiscytina Popov, 1993 Weald Clay, United Kingdom, Hauterivian
  - † Yuripopovia Jarzembowski, 1991 Weald Clay, United Kingdom, Hauterivian, Vectis Formation, United Kingdom, Aptian
- † Actinoscytina Tillyard, 1926 Croudace Bay Formation, Australia, Changhsingian
- † Eocercopis Handlirsch, 1939 Green Series, Germany, Toarcian
- † Heterojassus Evans, 1961 Mount Crosby Insect Bed, Australia, Norian
- † Heteronella Evans, 1961 Mount Crosby Insect Bed, Australia, Norian
- † Heteroscytina Evans, 1956
- † Hexascytina Wootton, 1963 Mount Crosby Insect Bed, Australia, Norian
- † Indutionomarus Szwedo, 2011 Bascharage, Luxembourg, Toarcian
- † Microscytinella Wootton, 1963 Mount Crosby Insect Bed, Australia, Norian
- † Ovicimex Hong & Wang, 1990 Laiyang Formation, China, Aptian
- † Pelorisca Popov & Shcherbakov, 1991 Madygen Formation, Kyrgyzstan, Ladinian
- † Platyscytinella Evans, 1956 Mount Crosby Insect Bed, Australia, Norian
- † Popovigocimex Martins-Neto & Galego, 2003 Los Rastros Formation, Argentina, Carnian
- † Popovus Özdikmen & Demir, 2007 Gurvan-Eren Formation, Mongolia, Aptian
- † Progonocimex Handlirsch, 1906 Green Series, Germany, Toarcian
- †Pseudipsvicia Handlirsch 1939 Blackstone Formation, Australia, Norian
- † Triassodoecus Evans, 1963 Hawkesbury Sandstone, Australia, Anisian
- † Triscytina Evans, 1956 Mount Crosby Insect Bed, Australia, Norian
- † Woottonia Popov & Shcherbakov, 1991 Tologoi Formation, Kazakhstan, Norian
- † Yurigocimex Martins-Neto & Galego, 2003 Los Rastros Formation, Argentina, Carnian
