= Archescytinidae =

Archescytinidae Temporal range: Early Permian-Early Jurassic, 298.9–175.6 Ma

Scientific classification
- Kingdom: Animalia
- Phylum: Arthropoda
- Class: Insecta
- Order: Hemiptera
- Suborden: †Paleorrhyncha
- Family: †Archescytinidae; Tillyard, 1926

Type genus
- †Archescytina Tillyard, 1926

Genera
- †Archescytina Tillyard, 1926 (type genus); †Arroyoscyta Rasnitsyn, 2004; †Austroscytina Evans, 1944; †Bekkerscytina Evans, 1958; †Eoscytina Evans, 1958; †Kaltanaphis Becker-Midgisova, 1959; †Kaltanoscytina Becker-Midgisova, 1959; †Lepidoscytina Wang, 1980; †Lithoscytina Carpenter, 1933; †Maripsocus Zalessky, 1939; †Paleoscytina Carpenter, 1933; †Parapermopsylla Zimmerman, 1962; †Permocephalus Evans, 1943; †Permopsylla Tillyard, 1926; †Permopsyllopsis Zalessky, 1939; †Permothrips Martynov, 1935; †Protopincombea Evans, 1943; †Sarbaloscytina Becker-Midgisova, 1959; †Sojanoscytina Martynov, 1933; †Tsekardaella Becker-Midgisova, 1960

Extinct family of insects

Archescytinidae is an extinct family belonging to the order Hemiptera that was first defined by Robert John Tillyard in 1926. They existed between the Asselian epoch of the Early Permian and the Toarcian epoch of the Early Jurassic.
