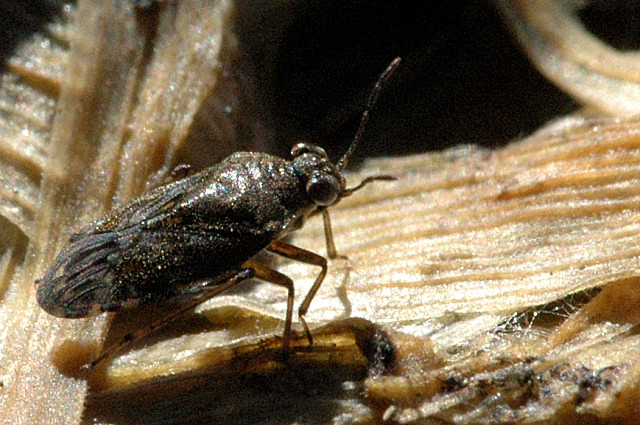
- Saldula palustris

Scientific classification
- Kingdom: Animalia
- Phylum: Arthropoda
- Class: Insecta
- Superorder: Condylognatha
- Order: Hemiptera
- Suborder: Heteroptera
- Infraorder: Leptopodomorpha

= Leptopodomorpha =

Shore bugs and allies

Infraorder of true bugs

Leptopodomorpha is an infraorder of insects in the order Hemiptera (true bugs). Leptopodomorpha is an infraorder of the order Heteroptera that contains more than 380 species. These small insects are also called shore bugs, or spiny shore bugs. As their name suggests, shore bugs range from being intertidal, to living near streams and lakes. Four families belong to this infraorder, the largest of which is Saldidae with about 350 species, compared to about 30 in Leptopodidae, and only 5 and 1 in Omaniidae and Aepophilidae respectively. Saldidae are known in particular for their jumping ability.

== Families ==
Two superfamilies are recognised:

=== Leptopodoidea ===
- Leptopodidae- spiny shore bugs
- Omaniidae
1. Corallocoris Cobben, 1970 – SE Asia, Australia, Oceania, Japan
2. Omania: includes Omania coleoptrata Horváth, 1915 - Oman

=== Saldoidea ===
- Aepophilidae Puton, 1879
  - monotypic Aepophilus bonnairei Signoret, 1879
- Saldidae- shore bugs
- †Archegocimicidae Handlirsch, 1906 (Late Triassic~Early Cretaceous)
