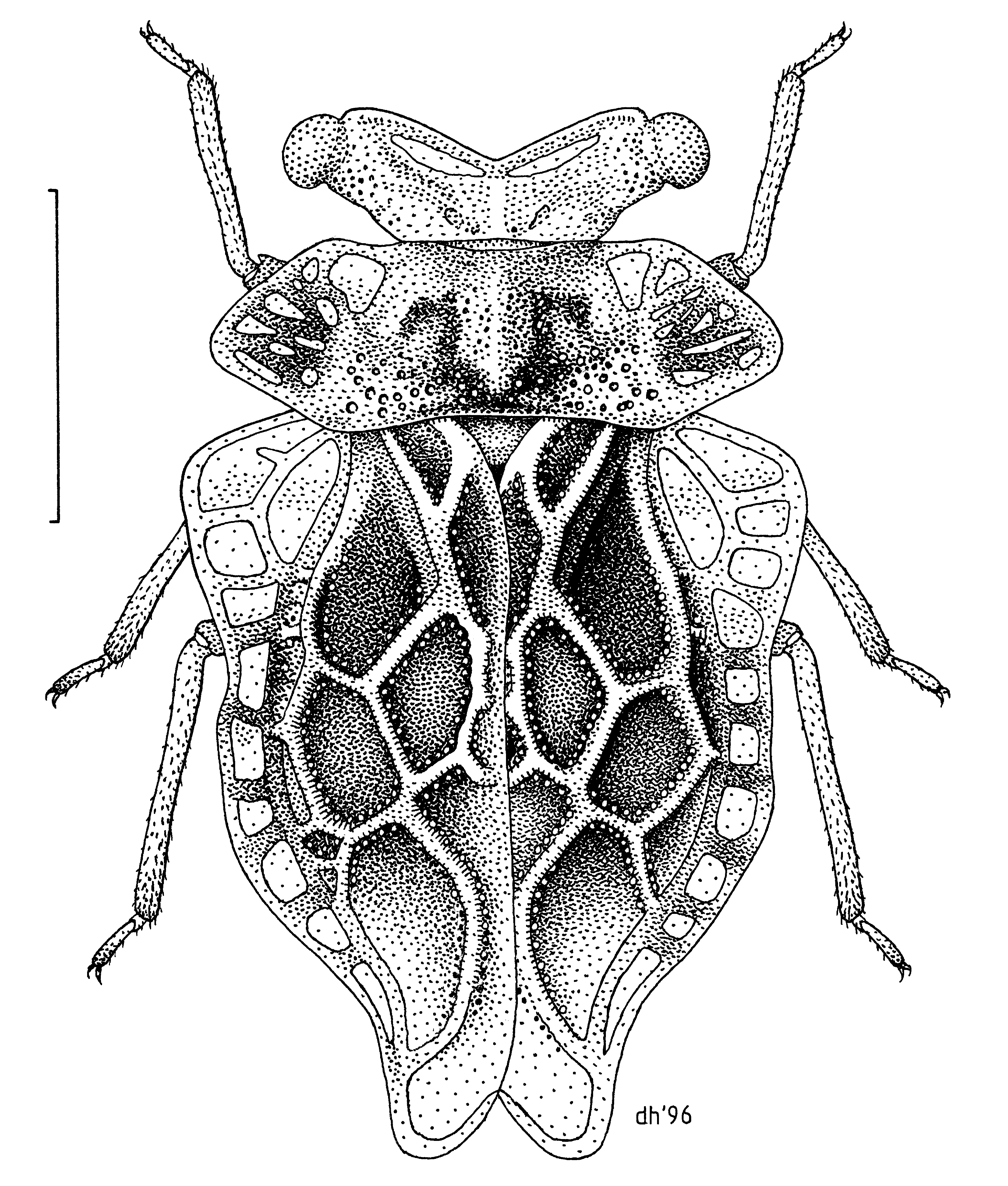
- Oiophysa distincta (Peloridiidae)
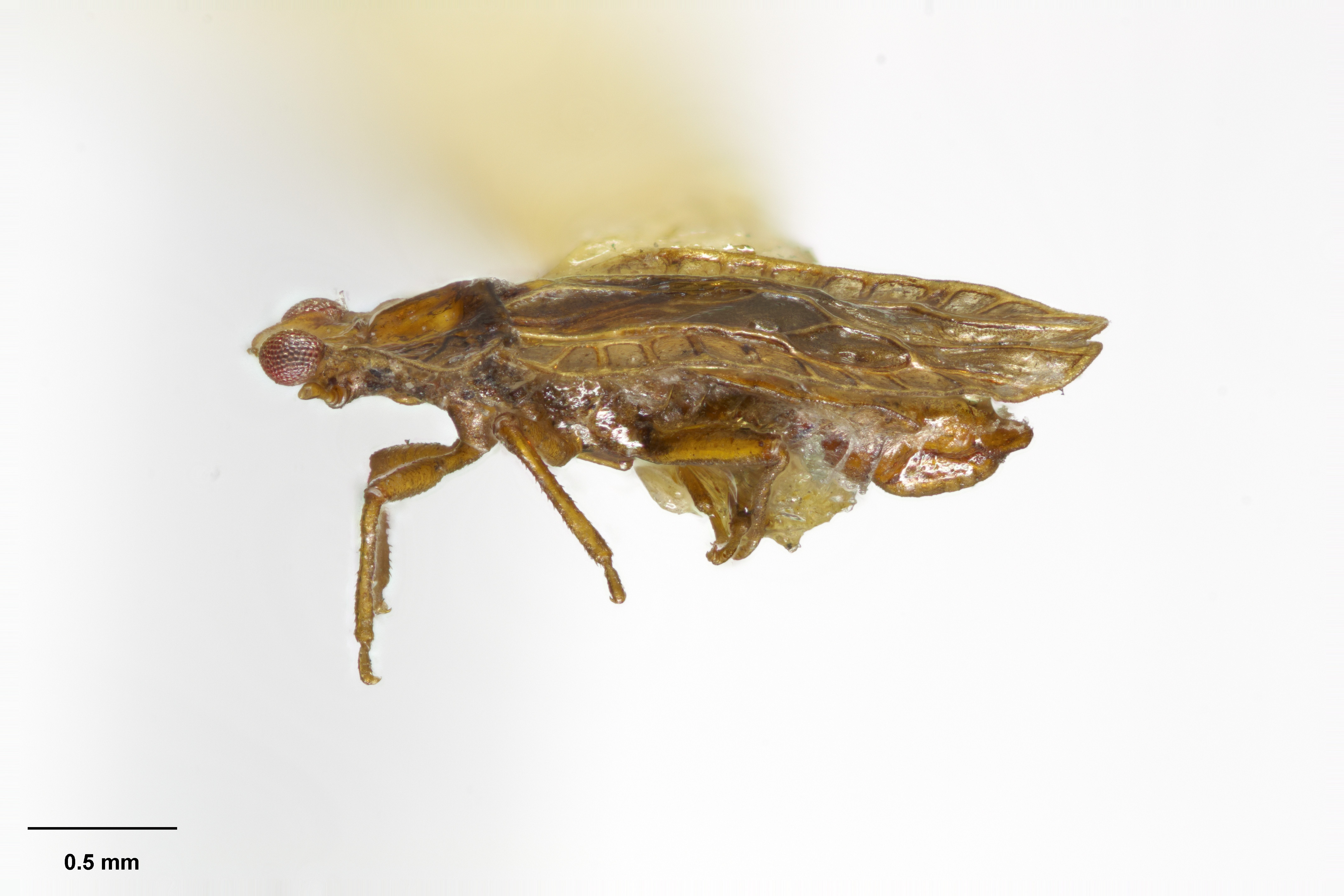
- Specimen of Xenophyes forsteri

Scientific classification
- Kingdom: Animalia
- Phylum: Arthropoda
- Class: Insecta
- Order: Hemiptera
- Suborder: Coleorrhyncha; Myers & China, 1929

Families
- †Hoploridiidae; †Karabasiidae; Peloridiidae; †Progonocimicidae; †Permoridiidae

= Coleorrhyncha =

Coleorrhyncha Temporal range: Asselian–Recent

Suborder of true bugs

Coleorrhyncha or Peloridiomorpha, also known as moss bugs or beetle bugs, are a suborder of Hemiptera and represent an ancient lineage of moss-feeding insects. They show some similarities to the Heteroptera but have been considered distinct. It has a single extant family, the Peloridiidae. They are 2 to 5 millimetres (0.079 to 0.197 in) in length, and feed on moss and liverworts. They have wings in some species which are reduced in others but all species are flightless and live in damp moss habitats and are associated with the distribution of Nothofagus trees in Australia, New Zealand, New Caledonia, and South America, which all were formerly part of the supercontinent Gondwana.

Three other major families have been established on the basis of fossils: Progonocimicidae (Late Permian to Late Cretaceous) Karabasiidae (Jurassic-Early Cretaceous) and Hoploridiidae (Early Cretaceous), which have been found in both the Northern and Southern Hemispheres. The oldest member of Coleorrhyncha is Permoridium from the early Permian (Asselian to early Sakmarian ~290-300 million years ago) of Germany, which appears to be more closely related to Peloridiidae than to any of the extinct families. The Coleorrhyncha were earlier included within the "Homoptera" but based on studies of their morphological similarities as well as molecular phylogeny are now considered as a sister group of the Heteroptera.

The fossil family Progonocimicidae was formerly considered as early Heteroptera or survivors from a stem group of Heteropteroides but based on morphology, Popov called them an ancestral sub-group of the Coleorrhyncha, and this has been followed by subsequent authors.

== Other reading ==
- Hoch, H. (2006). "Vibrational signalling in a Gondwanan relict insect (Hemiptera: Coleorrhyncha: Peloridiidae)". Biology Letters. 2 (2): 222–224. doi:10.1098/rsbl.2006.0451. PMC 1618915. PMID 17148367.
- Myers, John Golding; China, William Edward (1929). "The systematic position of the Peloridiidae as elucidated by a further study of the external anatomy of Hemiodoecus leadi China". Annals and Magazine of Natural History. 105 (3): 282–294. doi:10.1080/00222932908672971.
- Popov, Yu A.; Shcherbakov, Dmitry E. (1996). "Origin and evolution of the Coleorrhyncha as shown by the fossil record". In Schaefer, Carl W. (ed.). Studies on Hemipteran Phylogeny. Lanham, Maryland: Entomological Society of America. pp. 9–30. ISBN 978-0-938522-54-6.
- Shcherbakov, Dmitry E. (2005). "Fossils versus molecules and cladistics: controversies over the Hemiptera phylogeny". 12th International Auchenorrhyncha Congress, Berkeley, Volume 7.
- Wang, Bo; Szwedo, Jacek; Zhang, HaiChun (2009). "Jurassic Progonocimicidae (Hemiptera) from China and phylogenetic evolution of Coleorrhyncha" (PDF). Science in China Series D: Earth Sciences. 52 (12): 1953–1961. Bibcode:2009ScChD..52.1953W. doi:10.1007/s11430-009-0160-6. S2CID 131691517. Archived (PDF) from the original on 19 December 2013.
