= Gustav Breddin =

Gustav Breddin (25 February 1864, Magdeburg – 22 December 1909, Oschersleben) was a German entomologist who specialised in Hemiptera. He was a Realschule director. His collection lies in the German Entomological Institute.

== Works ==
A partial list of works includes:

- (1900). Hemiptera gesammelt von Professor Kükenthal im Malayischen Archipel.Abhandlungen der Senckenbergischen naturforschenden Gesellschaft 25: 139–202.
- (1901). Die Hemipteren von Celebes - Ein Beitrag zur Faunistik der Insel. Abhandlungen der Naturforschenden Gesellschaft zu Halle 24: 1–213.
- (1904). Versuch einer Rhynchotenfauna der Malayischen Insel Banguey. Mitteilungen des Museums für Völkerkunde in Hamburg 22: 201–226.
