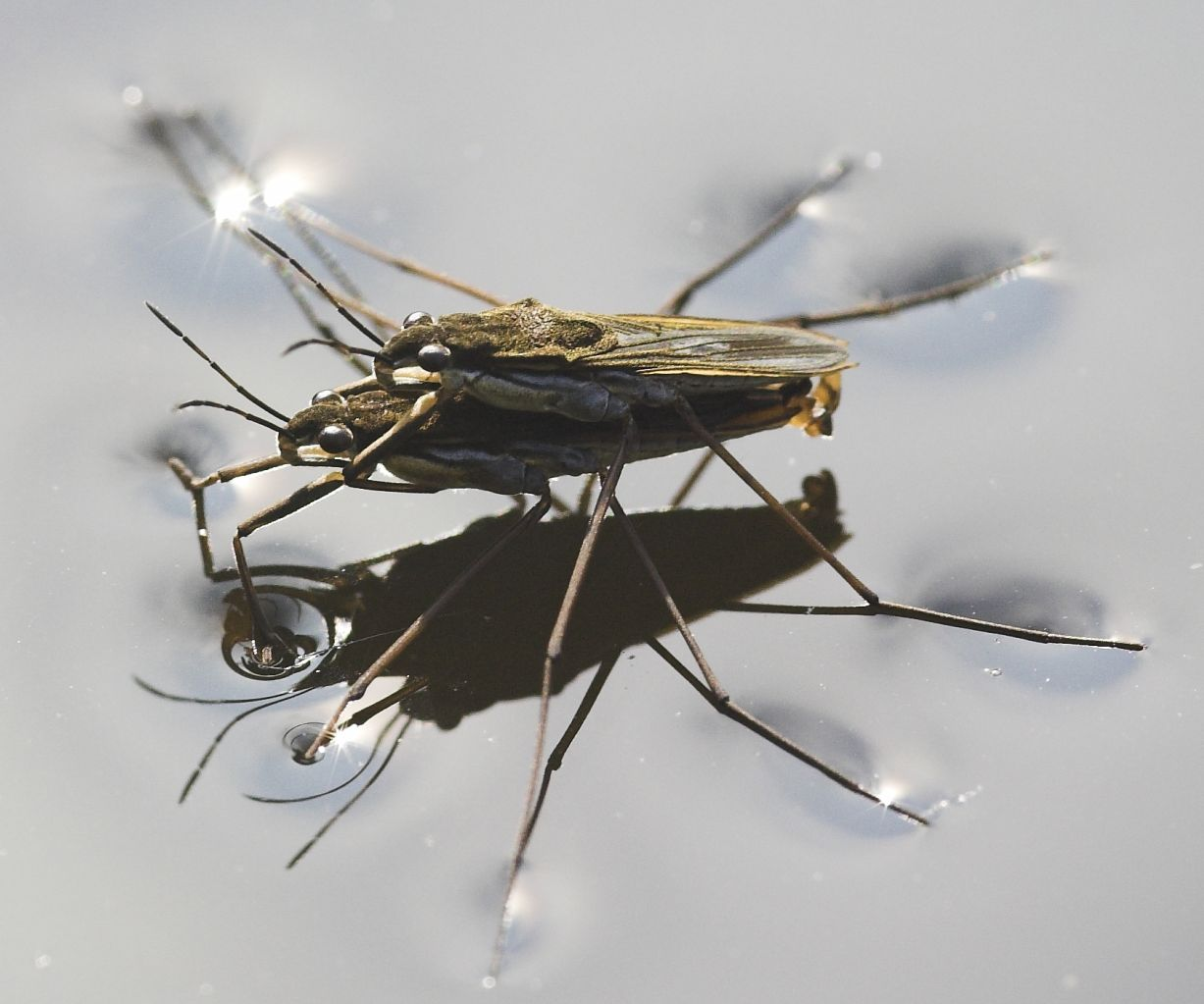
- Two water striders mating (Gerromorpha)

Scientific classification
- Kingdom: Animalia
- Phylum: Arthropoda
- Clade: Pancrustacea
- Class: Insecta
- Order: Hemiptera
- Suborder: Heteroptera; Latreille, 1810

Infraorders
- Cimicomorpha; Dipsocoromorpha; Enicocephalomorpha; Gerromorpha; Leptopodomorpha; Nepomorpha; Peloridiomorpha (see text); Pentatomomorpha

= Heteroptera =

Heteroptera Temporal range: Permian–Present

Suborder of true bugs

The Heteroptera are a group of about 40,000 species of insects in the order Hemiptera. They are sometimes called "true bugs", though that name more commonly refers to the Hemiptera as a whole. "Typical bugs" might be used as a more unequivocal alternative, since the heteropterans are most consistently and universally termed "bugs" among the Hemiptera. "Heteroptera" is Greek for "different wings": most species have forewings with both membranous and hardened portions (called hemelytra); members of the primitive sub-group Enicocephalomorpha have completely membranous wings.

The name "Heteroptera" is used in two very different ways in modern classifications. In Linnean nomenclature, it commonly appears as a suborder within the order Hemiptera, where it can be paraphyletic or monophyletic depending on its delimitation. In phylogenetic nomenclature, it is used as an unranked clade within the Prosorrhyncha clade, which in turn is in the Hemiptera clade. This results from the realization that the Coleorrhyncha are just "living fossil" relatives of the traditional Heteroptera, close enough to them to be united with that group.

The three infraorders Leptopodomorpha, Gerromorpha, and Nepomorpha comprise a significant component of the world's aquatic and semiaquatic insects. There are 23 families, 343 genera and 4,810 species group taxa within these three infraorders. Most of the remaining groups that are common and familiar are in the Cimicomorpha and Pentatomomorpha.

== Classification ==
Anatomy of the dorsal aspect of a shield bug. A: head; B: thorax; C: abdomen. 1: claws; 2: tarsus; 3: tibia; 4: femur; 8: compound eye; 9: antenna; 10: clypeus; 23: laterotergites (connexivum); 25: pronotum; 26: scutellum; 27: clavus; 28: corium; 29: embolium; 30: hemelytral membrane.

The name "Heteroptera" has typically had the rank either of order or of suborder, having been introduced in 1810 by Pierre André Latreille as a primary division within the order Hemiptera. It is now usually given a subsidiary rank within a larger definition of Hemiptera, but some reference works still include it as an order. Whether to continue treating it as a suborder is still a subject of some controversy, as is whether the name itself should ever be used, although three basic approaches ranging from abolishing it entirely to maintaining the taxonomy with a slight change in systematics is proposed, two of which (but not the traditional one) agree with the phylogeny. The competing classifications call for a preference for two suborders versus one when the "living fossil" family Peloridiidae is taken into consideration:

In one revised classification proposed in 1995, the name of the suborder is Prosorrhyncha, and Heteroptera is a rankless subgroup within it. The only difference between Heteroptera and Prosorrhyncha is that the latter includes the family Peloridiidae, which is a tiny relictual group that is in its own monotypic superfamily and infraorder. In other words, the Heteroptera and Prosorrhyncha sensu Sorensen et al. are identical except that Prosorrhyncha contains one additional infraorder, called Peloridiomorpha (comprising only 13 small genera). The ongoing conflict between traditional, Linnaean classifications and nontraditional classifications is exemplified by the problem inherent in continued usage of the name Heteroptera when it no longer can be matched to any standard Linnaean rank (as it falls below suborder but above infraorder). If this classification succeeds, then the "Heteroptera" grouping may be discarded, but in that case it is likely that no ranks will be used at all according to the standards of phylogenetic nomenclature.

In the traditional classification, the Peloridiidae are retained as their own suborder, called Coleorrhyncha; "Heteroptera" is treated the same. Functionally, the only difference between this classification and the preceding is that the former uses the name Prosorrhyncha to refer to a particular clade, while the traditional approach divides this into the paraphyletic Heteroptera and the monophyletic Coleorrhyncha. Many believe it is preferable to use only one name because the characteristics of the two traditional suborders are too closely related to be treated as separate.

Alternatively, the modified approach of placing Coleorrhyncha 'within' the Heteroptera can be used. Indeed, as that solution preserves the well-known Heteroptera at the taxonomic rank they traditionally hold while making them a good monophyletic group, it seems preferable to the paraphyletic "Heteroptera" used in older works. In that case, the "core" Heteroptera could be considered a section – as yet unnamed, mainly because the Prosorrhyncha were proposed earlier – within the "expanded" Heteroptera, or the latter could simply be described as consisting of a basal "living fossil" lineage and a more apomorphic main radiation. Whether the name "Coleorrhyncha" is to be retained for the basal lineage or whether the more consistent "Peloridiomorpha" is used instead is a matter of taste, as described below.

Separate from the question of the actual "closeness" of Heteroptera and Coleorrhyncha is the potential disruption to traditional construction of names; there seems to be reluctance among hemipterists to abandon the use of "Heteroptera". This can be seen by the name itself, as it is a violation of convention to use the ending "-ptera" for any rank above genus other than an order – though since it is a convention rather than a mandatory rule of Linnean nomenclature, taxonomists are technically free to violate it (which is why, for example, not all insect orders end in "-ptera", e.g., Odonata). However, in most cases when such conventions are violated, it does not create an internal conflict as in the present case (that is, the order Hemiptera has a suborder named Heteroptera, which is an internal conflict). At least some hemipterists argue that the name Heteroptera should be dropped entirely to eliminate this internal conflict, though the third possibility offers a workaround. In that case, to achieve full consistency of names "Coleorrhyncha" would probably be dropped in favor of "Peloridiomorpha".
