= Green leafhopper =

Green leafhopper may refer to several different taxa of leafhoppers:

- Cicadella viridis
- Empoasca
  - Empoasca decipiens
- Nephotettix, rice pests

== See also ==
- Jacobiasca formosana, known as the small green leafhopper or tea green leafhopper
