= Tea green leafhopper =

Tea green leafhopper (or leaf-hopper) may refer to:

- Empoasca vitis, also known as the false-eye leafhopper
- Jacobiasca formosana, also known as the tea jassid, distributed throughout East, South, and Southeast Asia
