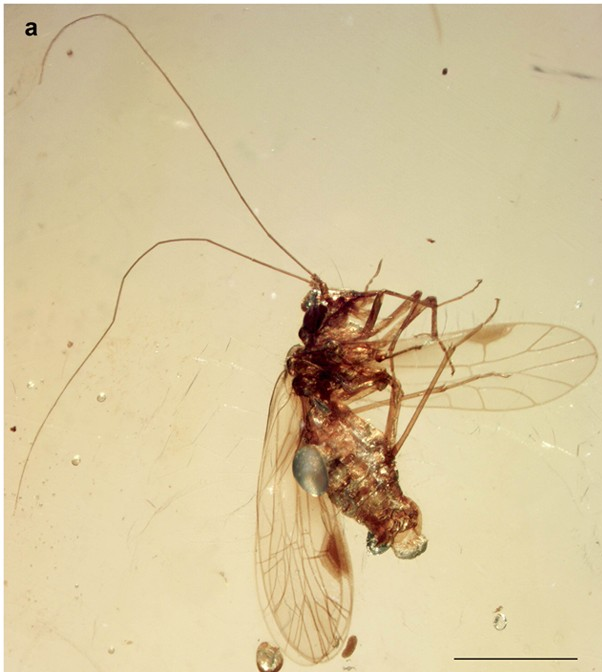
- Psocorrhyncha burmitica

Scientific classification
- Kingdom: Animalia
- Phylum: Arthropoda
- Clade: Pancrustacea
- Class: Insecta
- Clade: Eumetabola
- Order: †Permopsocida; Tillyard, 1926

Families
- †Psocidiidae; †Permopsocidae; †Archipsyllidae

= Permopsocida =

Permopsocida Temporal range: Moscovian–Cenomanian

Extinct genus of insects

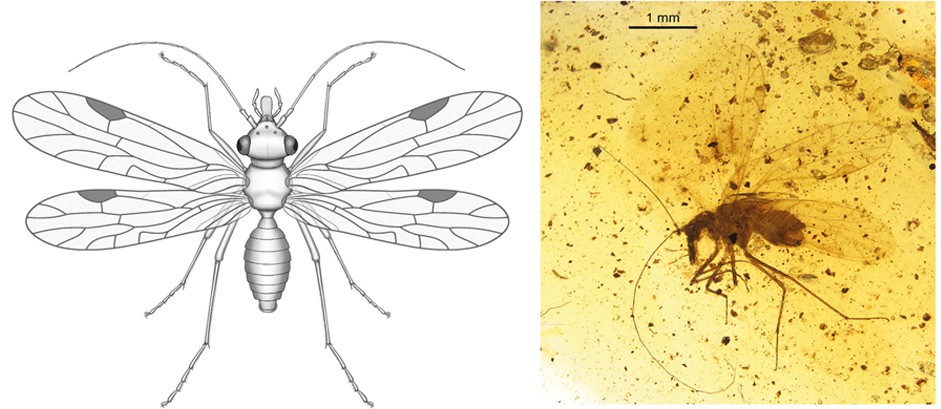

Permopsocida is an extinct order of insects known from the Carboniferous (Moscovian) to the Mid-Cretaceous. It is part of Paraneoptera, alongside bark lice (including lice), bugs and thrips. Within Paraneoptera it is considered to be closer to the clade containing bugs and thrips rather than bark lice, with an estimated divergence during the Late Carboniferous. The group was first named as a suborder by Robert John Tillyard in 1926, and was raised to a full order by Huang et al. in 2016. It is currently divided up into three families, Psocidiidae which is known from the Late Carboniferous to Liassic. Permopsocidae which is only known from the Permian, and Archipsyllidae, which is known from the Late Triassic to mid-Cretaceous (Cenomanian). While most members of the group are known from compression fossils, several members of Archipsyllidae are 3 dimensionally preserved in Burmese amber, which has helped clarify the morphology and phylogenetic position of the group. The morphology of the mouthparts suggests that they were capable of suction feeding and chewing, with preserved angiosperm pollen grains in the gut of Psocorrhyncha suggesting that at least some members of the group were pollenivorous.

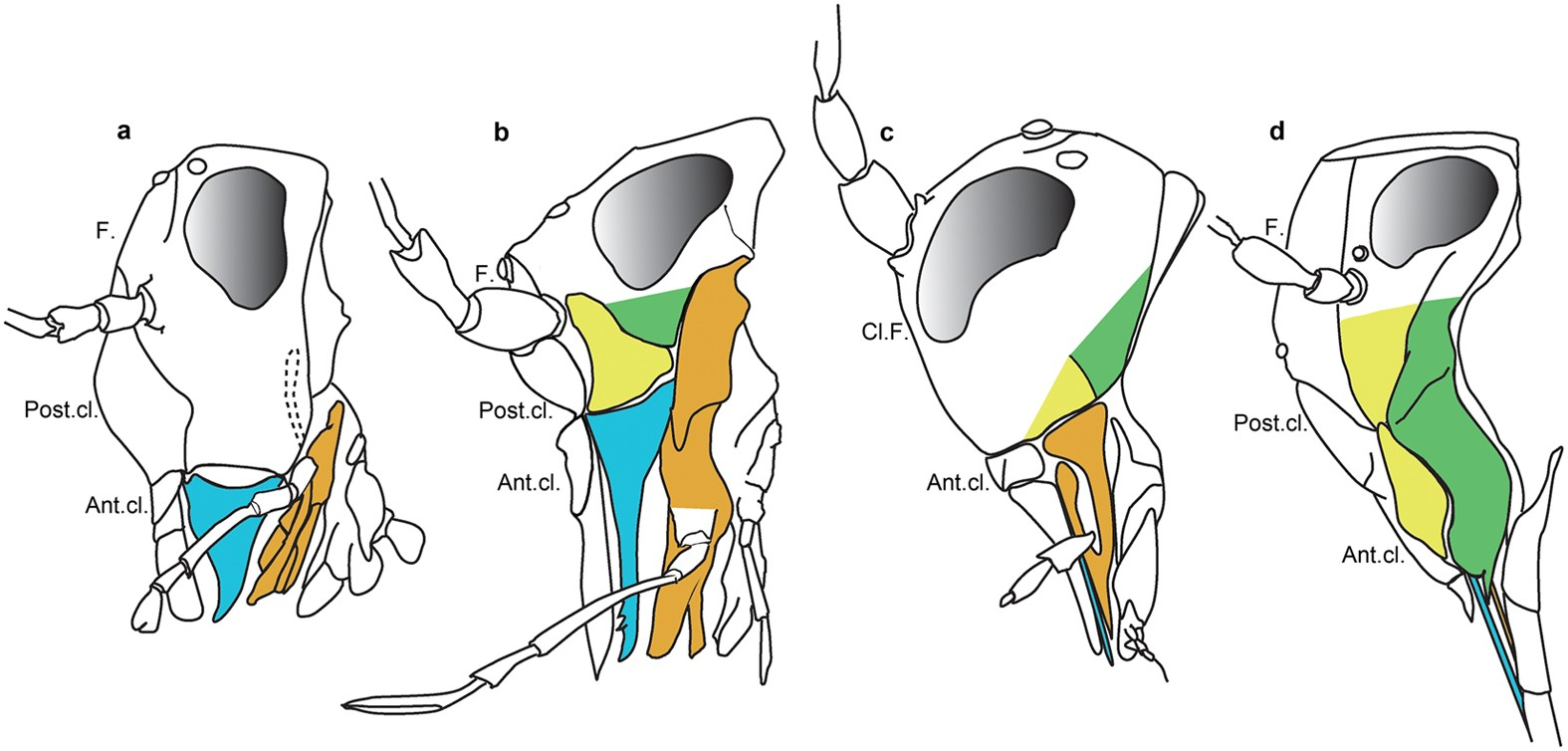
Comparison of the head morphology of Permopsocida (b) with that of Psocodea (a) Thysanoptera (c) and Hemiptera (d)

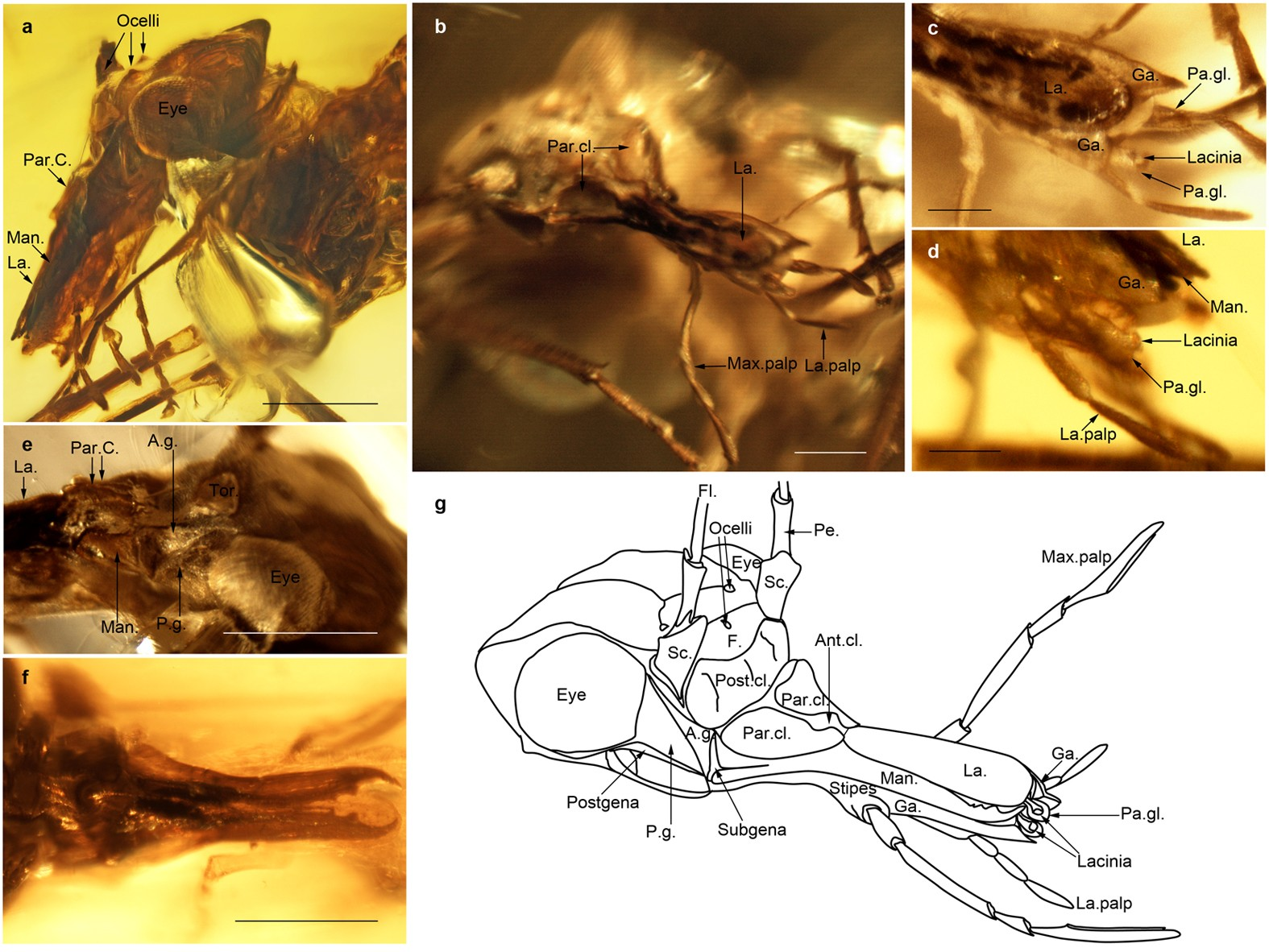
Head of Psocorrhyncha

== Taxonomy ==
From Huang et al 2016 and subsequent literature

- †Psocidiidae Tillyard, 1926
  - †Carbonopsocus Prokop et al., 2024 Osnabrück Formation, Germany, Carboniferous (Moscovian)
  - †Dichentomum Tillyard, 1926 Bursum Formation, New Mexico, Early Permian (Asselian) Wellington Formation, Kansas, Oklahoma, Early Permian (Artinskian) Koshelevka Formation, Russia, Early Permian (Kungurian),
  - †Hypopsylla Prokop, Garrouste & Nel, 2016 Croudace Bay Formation, Australia, Late Permian (Changhsingian)
  - †Liassopsocus Ansorge, 1996 "Green Series", Germany, Early Jurassic (Toarcian)
  - †Austropsocidium Tillyard 1935 Croudace Bay Formation, Australia, Changhsingian
  - †Stenopsocidium Tillyard 1935 Croudace Bay Formation, Australia, Changhsingian
- †Permopsocidae Tillyard, 1926
  - †Permopsocus Tillyard, 1926 Wellington Formation, Kansas, Artinskian
  - †Lithopsocidium Carpenter 1932 Wellington Formation, Kansas, Artinskian
  - †Orthopsocus Carpenter 1932 Wellington Formation, Kansas, Artinskian
  - †Progonopsocus Tillyard 1926 Wellington Formation, Kansas, Artinskian
- †Archipsyllidae Handlirsch, 1906
  - †Eopsylla Vishnyakova 1976 Iva-Gora Beds Formation, Russia, Middle Permian (Roadian)
  - †Archipsylla Handlirsch, 1908 "Green Series", Germany, Toarcian Daohugou, China, Middle Jurassic (Callovian), Karabastau Formation, Kazakhstan, Late Jurassic
  - †Archipsyllodes Vishniakova, 1976 Zaza Formation, Russia, Early Cretaceous (Aptian)
  - †Archipsyllopsis Vishniakova, 1976 Zaza Formation, Russia, Aptian
  - †Bittacopsocus Beutel et al. 2019 Burmese amber, Myanmar, mid Cretaceous (latest Albian-earliest Cenomanian)
  - †Burmopsylla Liang, Zhang & Liu, 2016 Burmese amber, Myanmar
  - †Dinmopsylla Lambkin, 2018 Blackstone Formation, Australia, Late Triassic (Norian)
  - †Mydiognathus Yoshizawa & Lienhard, 2016 Burmese amber, Myanmar
  - †Psocorrhyncha Huang et al. 2016 Burmese amber, Myanmar
