= Small green leafhopper =

Small green leafhopper (or leaf-hopper) may refer to:

- Empoasca flavescens
- Jacobiasca formosana, also known as the tea jassid
