= Empoasca decedens =

Scientific classification
- Kingdom: Animalia
- Phylum: Arthropoda
- Class: Insecta
- Order: Hemiptera
- Suborder: Auchenorrhyncha
- Family: Cicadellidae
- Genus: Empoasca
- Species: E. decedens

Binomial name
- Empoasca decedens Paoli, 1932

Synonyms
- Asymmetrasca decedens (Paoli, 1932)

Species of true bug

Empoasca decedens is a species of leafhoppers belonging to the family Cicadellidae. This species has a small, slender body with a yellowish green coloration. Both males and females measure between 3.1 to 3.3 millimetres (0.12 to 0.13 in) in length.

== Distribution and hosts ==
Empasca decedens is believed to be native to the Mediterranean region and is widely distributed here. However, it has been recorded in Middle Eastern countries such as Iran and Pakistan and also in various western Asiatic countries, including China, North Korea and India.

Recently, E. decedens has been found in Madeira Island, along with 3 morphotypes of Empoasca which reproduce parthenogenetically.

Although it has generally been considered that E. decedens is a Mediterranean species, several publications show that it has a much wider area of distribution. Whether it is native to all of its range or has been recently introduced is not clear. Empoasca decedens can cause damage to many different food plants and is able to endure very diverse environmental conditions, which suggests that this species has a great potential to successfully colonize new areas.

Empoasca decedens has been recorded from 61 plant species of 50 genera belonging to 29 different families. These food plants are spontaneous and cultivated, including ornamental and horticultural plants and fruit trees. About half of its host plants are herbaceous plants but it is also associated with trees and, to a lesser extent, with shrubs, either deciduous or perennial.

== Damage ==
Empoasca decedens is a highly polyphagous species, constituting an important pest to several cultivated plants including several fruit trees such as citrus, peaches, and almonds. It also damages many other cultivated plants such as cotton, raspberries, potatoes, vines and grain plants.

The feeding on the leaves causes discoloration but other common effects are deformation of leaves, leaf curling and necrosis from the apex to the basis of the leaves, usually known as hopperburn. Apart from the damage to leaves, fruits such as oranges can also be attacked. On these, the insects cause pale yellow spots, which diminish the quality and the external appearance resulting in the loss of its commercial value. It has been demonstrated recently that this species can transmit phytoplasms to plums and apricots. Polyphagous species such as E. decedens represent a potential problem if they are introduced into new areas because they can shift to new food plants.

== Control ==
The most common method of pest control is chemical and several of these have been tested. The recommended chemicals to control Empoasca decedens are organophosphates, nicotinoids and pyrethroids. These affect the nervous system or are growth regulation inhibitors.
