= Western potato leafhopper =

Scientific classification
- Kingdom: Animalia
- Phylum: Arthropoda
- Class: Insecta
- Order: Hemiptera
- Suborder: Auchenorrhyncha
- Family: Cicadellidae
- Genus: Empoasca
- Species: E. abrupta

Binomial name
- Empoasca abrupta DeLong, 1931

Species of true bug

The western potato leafhopper (Empoasca abrupta) are small, yellow, green or brown winged insects. That reach a length of approximately 3mm.

Leafhoppers infest potato plants, and suck sap from potato leaves, causing a yellow mottle. Their eggs are usually laid within plant, and thus are invisible.
