= Symbiopectobacterium =

Scientific classification
- Domain: Bacteria
- Kingdom: Pseudomonadati
- Phylum: Pseudomonadota
- Class: Gammaproteobacteria
- Order: Enterobacterales
- Family: Enterobacteriaceae
- Genus: Symbiopectobacterium; Nadal et al. 2022

Type species
- Symbiopectobacterium purcellii.

Genus of bacteria

Symbiopectobacterium is a genus of bacteria which are all symbionts of arthropods, particularly hemipteran insects, as well as being described from nematode worms. The first record of a member of this genus was the BEV strain (bacterium of Euscelidius variegatus) isolated by Alexander Purcell from leafhoppers. The microbe showed both horizontal transmission between through plant surfaces and vertical transmission through eggs; infection of the leafhopper was thought to potentiate phytoplasm transmission from insect to plant.

Strains allied to this genus (as based on 16S rRNA gene sequence and other markers) have also been retrieved from bedbugs and a range of other hemipteran insects. The bulrush bug Chilacis carries a related vertically transmitted symbiont housed in a gut mycetome, in what appears to be an obligate association. Latterly, the symbiont was described as an obligate symbiont of Howardula nematodes, where the name Ca. Symbiopectobacterium was first used. The recovery of Symbiopectobacterium into pure culture from the insect Empoasca decipiens led to its formal description as a bacterial genus.
