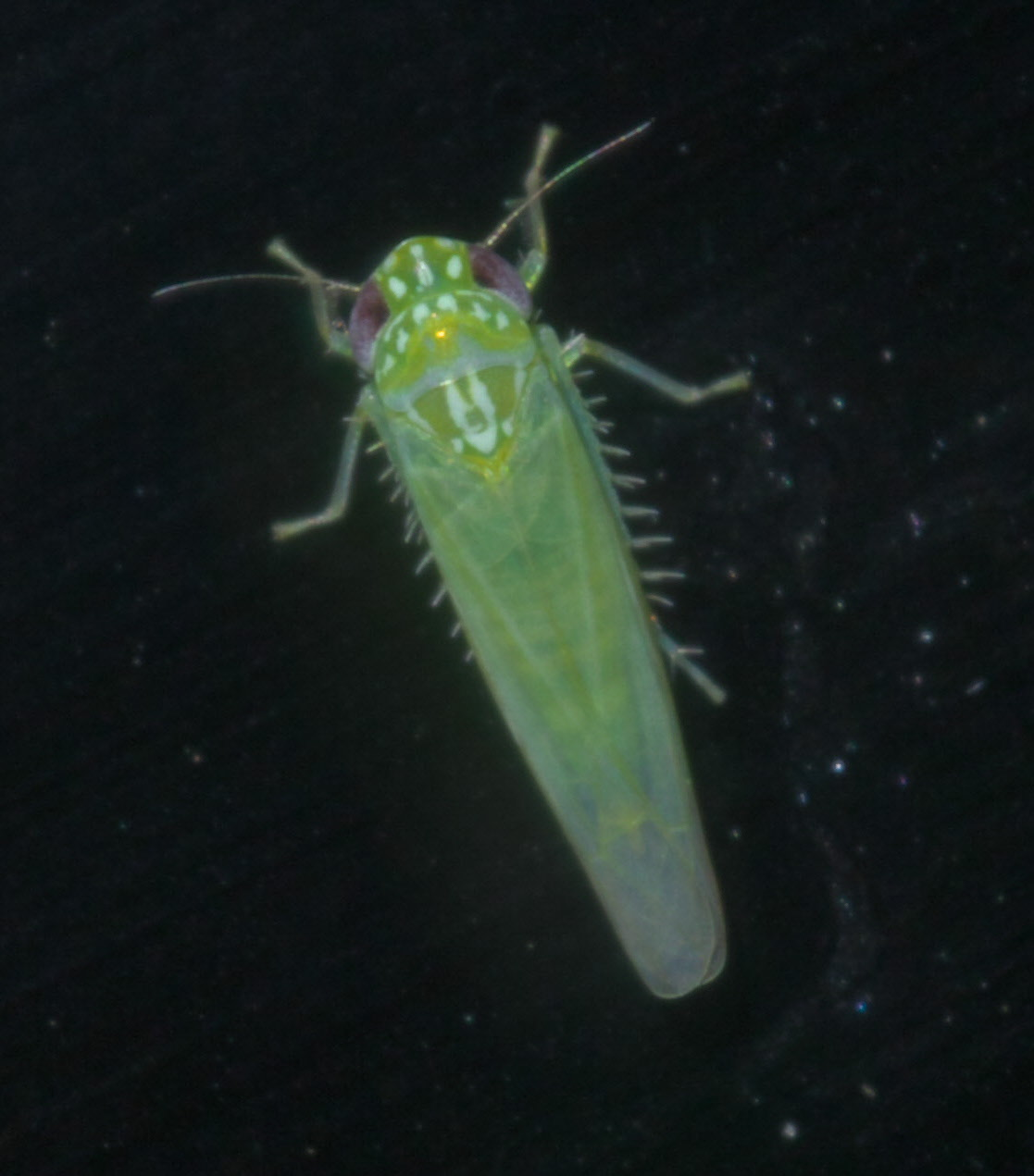

Scientific classification
- Kingdom: Animalia
- Phylum: Arthropoda
- Clade: Pancrustacea
- Class: Insecta
- Order: Hemiptera
- Suborder: Auchenorrhyncha
- Family: Cicadellidae
- Genus: Empoasca
- Species: E. fabae

Binomial name
- Empoasca fabae (Harris, 1841)

= Potato leafhopper =

Species of true bug

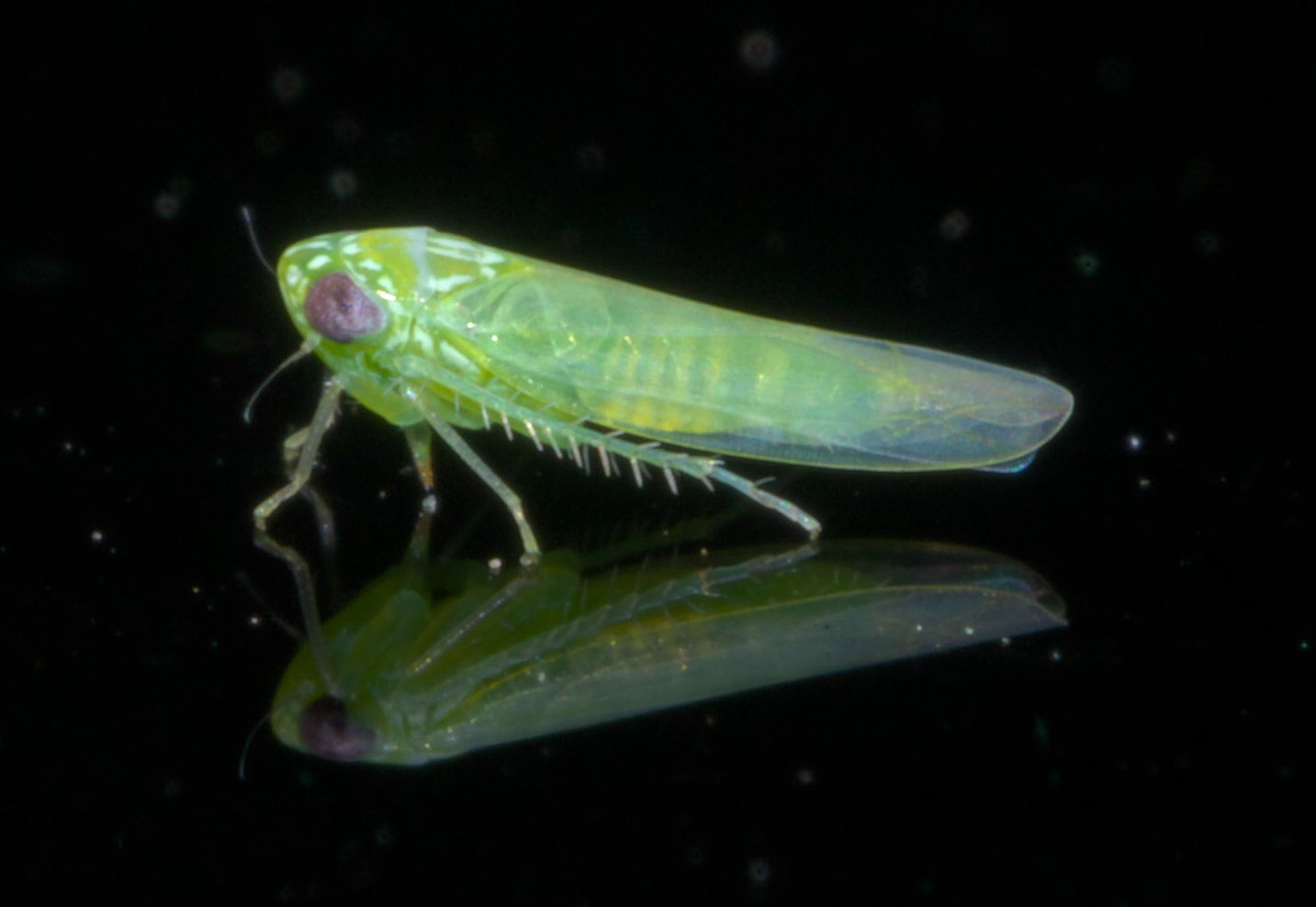
Empoasca fabae, potato leafhopper

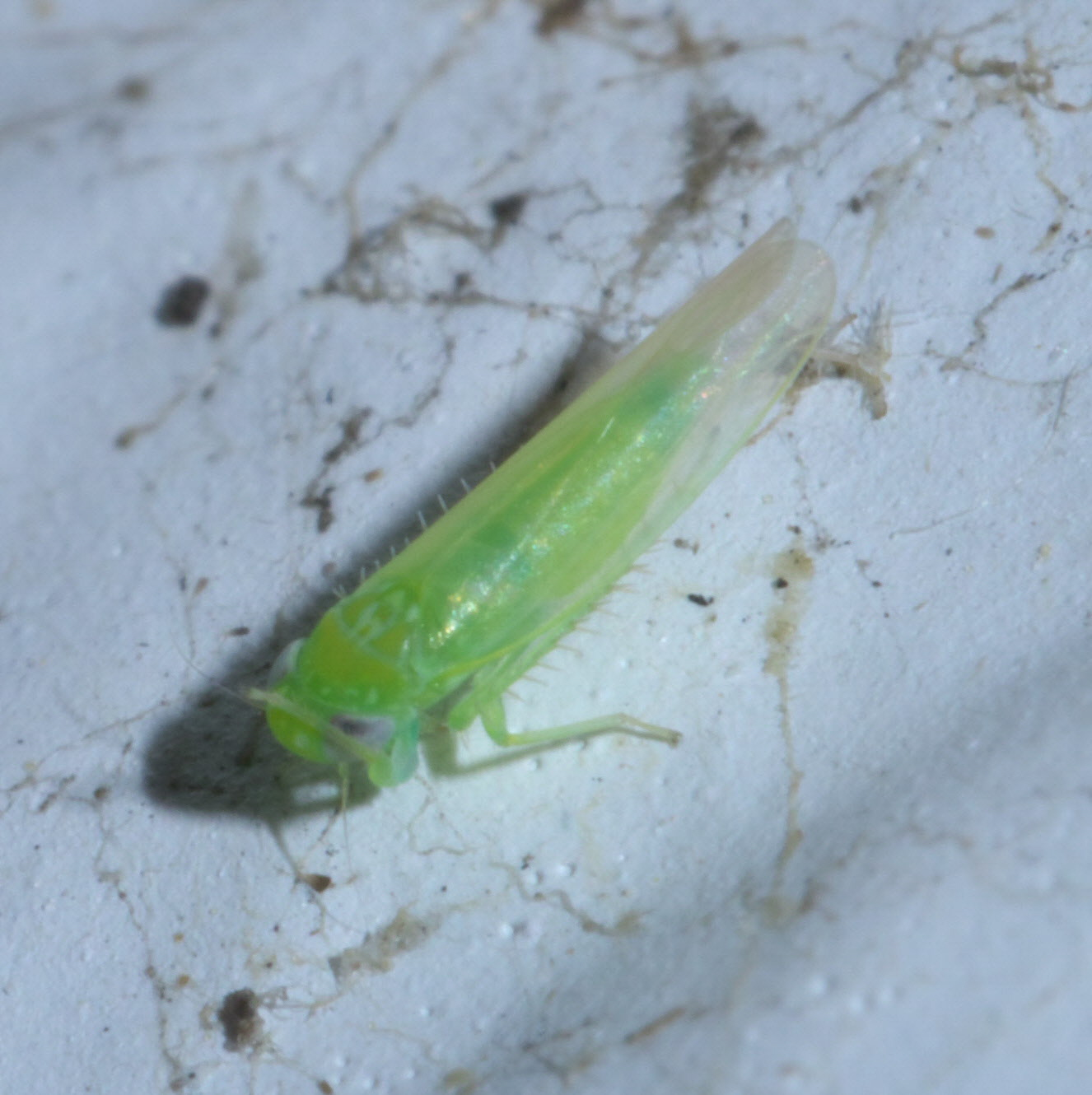
Empoasca fabae, potato leafhopper, Size: 3.3 mm

Potato leafhopper (Empoasca fabae) belongs to family Cicadellidae and genus Empoasca within order Hemiptera. In North America they are a serious agricultural pest. Every year millions of dollars are lost from reduced crop yields and on pest management. Crops that are impacted the most are potatoes, clover, beans, apples and alfalfa.

== Appearance ==
Adults have pale to iridescent green bodies with 6 or 8 white spots on their pronotum. They have a distinctive white H shape mark between their head and wing base. Their bodies are approximately 3 mm long and have on their front wings near its tip a crossvein. Adults and nymphs move by hopping among host plants. However, only adults can fly.

== Diet ==
They are able to feed and reproduce on at least 200 different plant species across twenty-six families. In total herb genera represent 64% of their hosts. Adults prefer to feed on the leaves and stems, while the nymphs prefer the leaves. Their specialized mouth parts are able to pierce into the plant tissue and remove its sap. The ability to inhabit a wide range of hosts is due to the variation in their feeding behaviors.

== Migration ==
Empoasca fabae is a seasonal migration species. If they are flying at night, it takes two or three days to reach their summer destinations. Research suggests that they are using winds as a passive means to help migrate. The direction of the winds influence their distribution within their summer range. Typically, the winds blow in a north-northeast direction towards Northern and Midwest United States. Factors such as warm temperatures and lack of precipitation increases their range. Cold temperatures, major precipitation, and unsuitable environmental conditions are factors that will stop migration to continue more north. In late summer, cold fronts start to appear sending cues for them to leave. As they leave they get caught up in these fronts which carry them south to southwest to their overwintering range.

== Habitat and range ==
=== Winter ===
Due to their inability to tolerate the cold winter temperatures they must migrate south. Adults overwinter on hosts in the pine and mixed hardwood forests along the Gulf of Mexico and in the Southern United States. Eastern Texas and Oklahoma, Virginia, Louisiana, Florida, Georgia, South and North Carolina, Alabama, Tennessee, Arkansas, and Mississippi, have documented populations. Before migrating back to their summer range they change their hosts to herbaceous legumes then to new spring foliage of deciduous trees.

=== Summer ===
Their summer range extends across the Midwest and eastern parts of Canada and the United States. In Canada, they are found only in the Great Lakes region. They are able to inhabit a wide range of habitats. Only about 32% of individuals actually occupy croplands. The remaining individuals will reside in fields, woodlands, scrublands, waste places, and parks. Precipitation will deposit individuals upon plant hosts where they will quickly re-establish themselves.

== Development and reproduction ==
=== Diapause ===
Before migrating they mate and enter reproductive diapause. Empoasca fabae begin to enter into reproductive dispause at the end of July. The entire population remains in this state for its migration and overwintering period. This diapause period ends from mid-January through February, and they begin to sexually mature.

=== Egg laying ===
During the spring migration north, the majority of the individuals are females. When they return if temperatures are above 10 °C they can start oviposition and populations grow and re-establish themselves. Empoasca fabae arrives back to their summer ranges during April or early May depending on the location.

During the summer months they can, on average, lay eggs over a span of 96 days. Peak population densities occur during late May to late June. Many overlapping generations appear. After this their population densities begin to decline slowly. Individuals have a tendency to aggregate as their populations increase. At the end of the summer, individuals either die or migrate south.

=== Eggs and hatchlings ===
Eggs are laid on their hosts; they are transparent and small in size. Females will lay 2 or 3 eggs a day on the plant's stem and leaf veins. The egg's incubation period ranges from 4 through 23 days, the hatchings are called nymphs. New hatchlings are white in colour and develop their green colouring as they age. The nymphs undergo five instars before becoming adults. As they develop, they lose their skin and develop their wings. Empoasca fabae develops into adults in 8 through 37 days. Their entire lifecycle is one month long.

== As a pest ==
=== Hopperburn ===
The visually descriptive term hopperburn is used for a distinct type of damage on plants by E. fabae's feeding on its hosts. As they feed their saliva mechanically injures the phloem and parenchyma cells. The plant also suffers damage to its vascular cambium, and to its vascular bundles. Within 24 hours of being infested, rates of photosynthesis, and transpiration are reduced, leaves accumulate starch, and transport of photoassimilates are reduced.

The first symptoms of hopperburn is that a leaflet's margins start to curl up. As a plant's infestation increases, its leaves cup downward, and they start to turn from green to yellow. In severe infestations this leads to leaf necrosis in which the leaf margins and intervein areas turn brown. Older plants completely lose their leaves. Young plants display tip-wilting and will be stunted in height. Plants that were damaged by stem feeding suffered more damage to their physiologies than those which were damaged by leaf eating.

Research has shown that water-stressed plants increase nymph's development time. This causes severe hopperburn due to the increase plant stress response.

=== Economic impacts ===
Hopperburn leads to reduced plant growth and reproduction. In some heavily infested fields up to 75% of the yield is lost, it depends on what stage of development the plants are in. Obviously, this leads to reductions in crop yields and large economic losses. For example, in 1988 the losses of alfalfa crops in Northeast United States ranged from $32-$66 per hectare. The amount of crop damage is directly proportional to the population density. Most crop damage comes from the future generations of the initial arrivals back to the summer range.

=== Climate change ===
Research has indicated that over the last 62 years that they have been arriving back to their summer range earlier by ten days. Warmer temperatures increases the time and speed of egg hatching and nymph development. There is increasing concern that climate change will shift the overwintering and summer ranges more northward. This will exacerbate the problem of pest management and increase economic losses. .

=== Pest management ===
Usually, crop detection of E. fabae is too late as hopperburn is the first visual symptom of a major infestation. Regular crop inspections with a sweep net are essential to help reduce massive economic losses. Another visual cue is the death of leaves with small pits holes throughout them resulting from their eggs. Host expansion is likely caused from the loss of natural resistance through extensive plant breeding.

Currently, the only effective method that exists for controlling E. fabae's infestations is the heavy application of insecticides. Short-lived insecticides such as carbaryl are commonly used; however they require costly reapplications.

Research is indicating the possibility of being able to control populations by increasing E. fabae's natural enemies as part of pest management plan. Percent mortality has been shown to be highest in individuals in younger instars. Research has shown that natural resistance and pesticide use are just as effective, but neither is capable to fully contain populations. To create more effective management programs and reduce pesticide use it is essential to understand their dispersion, temporal and spatial patterns.
