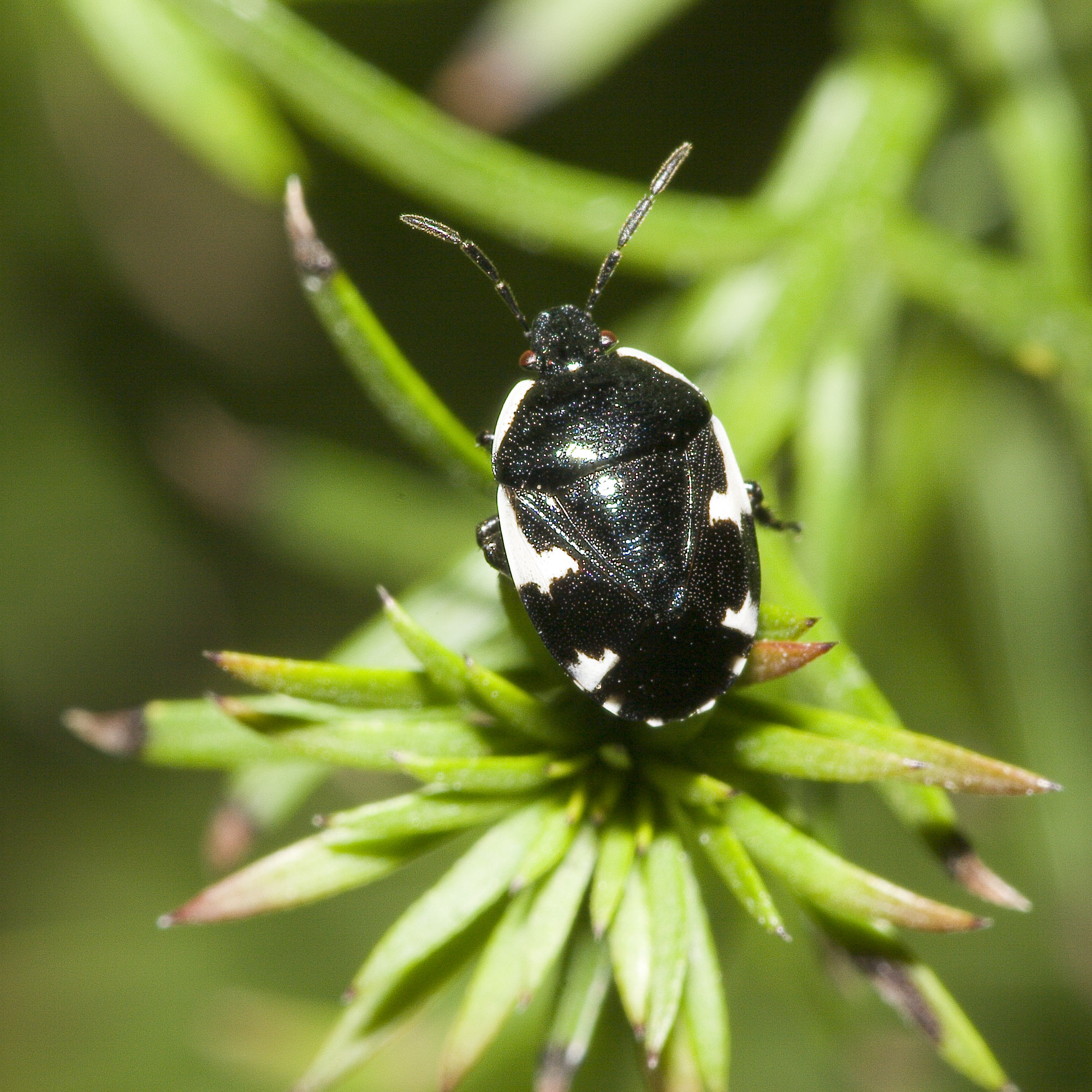
- Tritomegas sexmaculatus (order Hemiptera)

Scientific classification
- Kingdom: Animalia
- Phylum: Arthropoda
- Clade: Pancrustacea
- Class: Insecta
- Clade: Eumetabola
- Superorder: Condylognatha

Orders
- Thysanoptera – thrips; Hemiptera – true bugs

= Condylognatha =

Condylognatha Temporal range: Carboniferous period–Holocene, 350–0 Ma

Superorder of insects

Condylognatha or Panhemiptera is a monophyletic grouping (superorder) that contains Hemiptera (true bugs) and Thysanoptera (thrips). Condylognatha belongs to Paraneoptera, which include its sister group, lice (Psocodea).

== Taxonomy ==
Hemiptera and Thysanoptera are both the sister-groups based on morphological characters, and jointly known as Condylognatha.

=== Hemiptera ===
Hemiptera /hɛˈmɪptərə/ is an order of insects most often known as the true bugs (cf. bug), comprising around 50,000–80,000 species of cicadas, aphids, planthoppers, leafhoppers, shield bugs, bed bugs and others. They range in size from 1 millimetre (0.039 in) to around 15 centimetres (5.9 in), and share a common arrangement of sucking mouthparts.

=== Thrips ===
Order Thysanoptera includes 5,500 species classified into two suborders distinguished by the ovipositor. Terebrantia have a well-developed conical ovipositor, while the Tubulifera do not. Instead the abdomen is drawn out in the shape of a tube. These insects are called thrips.

== Phylogeny ==
- Condylognatha
  - Thysanoptera (thrips)
  - Hemiptera (true bugs)
    - Sternorrhyncha (aphids and others)
    - - Heteroptera (shield bugs, assassin bugs, etc)
      - - Coleorrhyncha (moss bugs)
        - Auchenorrhyncha
          - Fulgoromorpha (planthoppers)
          - Cicadomorpha (cicadas, leafhoppers, spittlebugs, etc)
