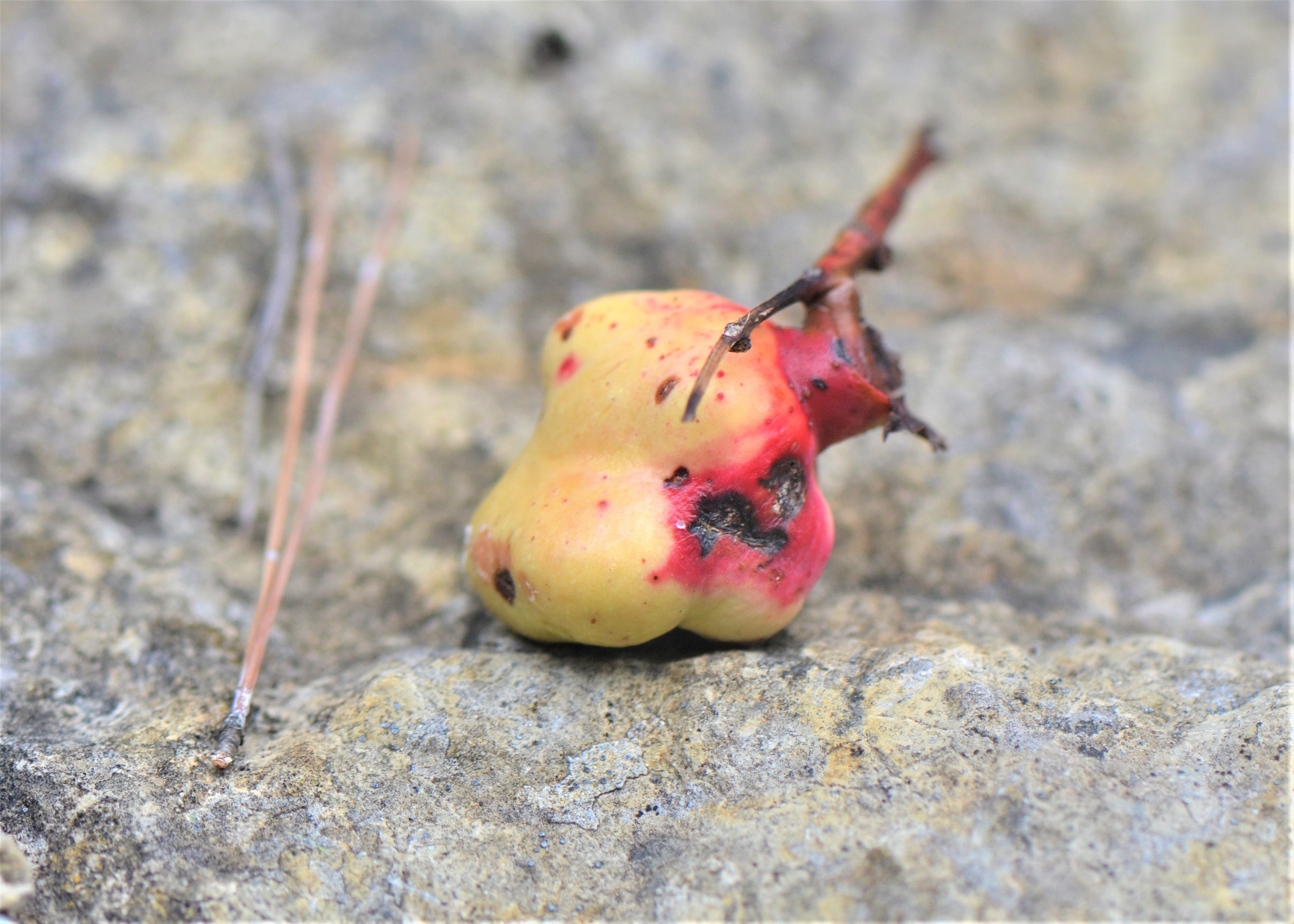

Scientific classification
- Kingdom: Animalia
- Phylum: Arthropoda
- Class: Insecta
- Order: Hemiptera
- Suborder: Sternorrhyncha
- Family: Aphididae
- Genus: Geoica
- Species: G. utricularia

Binomial name
- Geoica utricularia (Passerini, 1860)

= Geoica utricularia =

Species of aphid

Geoica utricularia is a species of aphid. It is a pest of millets.
