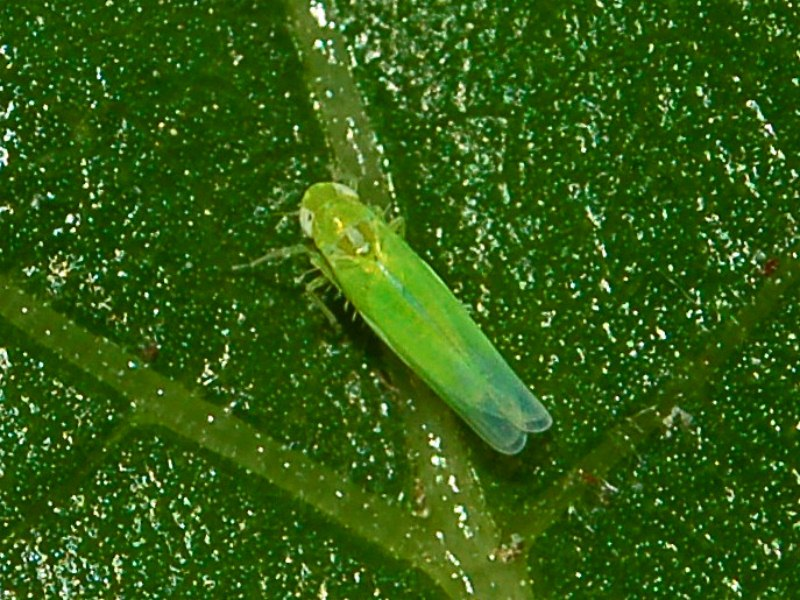
- Empoasca cf. decipiens

Scientific classification
- Kingdom: Animalia
- Phylum: Arthropoda
- Class: Insecta
- Order: Hemiptera
- Suborder: Auchenorrhyncha
- Family: Cicadellidae
- Genus: Empoasca
- Species: E. decipiens

Binomial name
- Empoasca decipiens Paoli, 1930

= Empoasca decipiens =

Species of true bug

Empoasca decipiens is a species of leafhopper belonging to the family Cicadellidae subfamily Typhlocybinae. The adults reach 3–4 millimetres (0.12–0.16 in) of length and an are homogenously green with whitish markings on its pronotum and vertex. E. decipiens is commonly referred to as the “green leafhopper” because of its colouration. The absence of clear stripes along the forewings can easily distinguish it from the similar leafhopper species E. vitis, but distinguishing it from other leafhoppers with the same colouration requires examination under a microscope. It is present in most of Europe, in the eastern Palearctic realm, in North Africa, in the Near East, and in the Afrotropical realm. Both nymphs and adults of this small insect are considered to be a very destructive pests on field crops, vegetables and greenhouse plants.

== Life history ==
=== Reproduction and development ===
The green leafhopper is dioecious and reproduces sexually. Females will insert their fertilized eggs into the tissue or the stem of a host plant using their ovipositor. The larvae will hatch after 1–4 days. E. decipiens undergoes incomplete metamorphosis, meaning the nymphs resemble adult leafhoppers during their five nymphal stages, but do not develop wings until their fourth instar. Development takes 10–37 days depending on temperature and the host plant selected. The optimal temperature for egg development is 24 °C, and broad bean has been recorded numerous times as the preferred host plant although it has been noted to choose a large variety of plants for oviposition. The leafhopper may have 10 generations per year in warmer climates, such as in North Africa, 2-3 generations per years in Europe, and 4-5 generations in greenhouses. Adults can typically be seen from June through to December.

=== Symbiosis ===
E. decipiens is sometimes associated with the symbiotic microbe, Symbiopectobacterium. The type species of this genus, S. purcellii, was cultivated from an infected E. decipiens individual. The impact of the symbiont on the host is not known.

=== Habitat ===
E. decipiens usually colonizes the under surface of leaves. Previous studies have established that the leafhopper prefers species of plants whose leaves lack trichomes, have soft tissues, and are of large size. They typically aggregate in groups on leaves when population density is high, but will be randomly distributed when populations are small. They are diurnal, and studies conducted in Turkey revealed that leafhopper activity starts at 8:00 a.m. and gradually increases to its maximum during the hours of 12:00 a.m. to 2:00 p.m. The amount and time of activity does change with regards to the geographic location of the species.

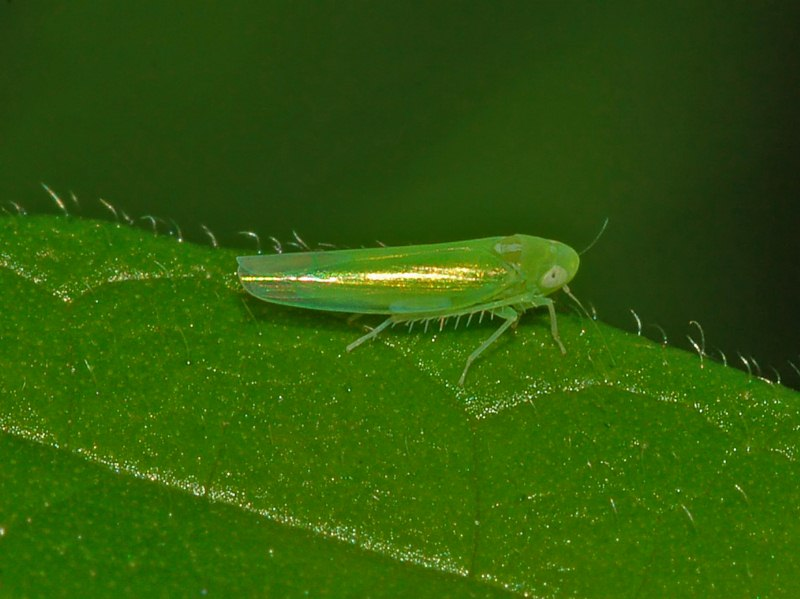

== Feeding damage ==
Both adult and nymph green leafhoppers are polyphagous and attack various kinds of vegetables, ornamental plants, and field crops. They do so by puncturing the phloem and xylem tissues of the plants with their stylets. They then inject saliva containing certain chemicals that allow them to rupture plant cells and ingest the mixtures flowing through the plant tissues. The movement of the insect's stylet in the plant causes the vessels to become blocked and obstructs the flow of nutrients throughout the disturbed plant. This type of damage is caused by many other leafhopper species and it is called hopperburn. Symptoms of hopperburn resembles plant senescence and include necrosis around the feeding sites, which may cause leaves to prematurely drop, and chlorosis occurring at the leaf margins and around the leaf veins. This feeding behavior can lead to significant monetary losses for growers of vegetables and crops as hopperburn can reduce the quantity of crops by stunting young plant growth and can reduce overall yield. Additionally, the chlorosis caused by hopperburn can reduce quality of crops, and stylet punctures can remain visible on some fruits (e.g. capsicum, tomato) decreasing their market value.

E. decipiens is considered a pest of many crops throughout its geographical range, and it has increasingly become a serious pest in greenhouses throughout Europe. The green leafhopper has been recorded on broad bean (Vicia faba), green bean (Phaseolus vulgaris), pea (Pisum sativum), potato (Solanum tuberosum), tomato (Solanum lycopersicum), aubergine (Solanum melongena) and cucumber (Cucumis sativus), as well as sugar beet (Beta vulgaris) and cotton (genus Gossypium).

== Control ==
=== Synthetic insecticides ===
Synthetic insecticides have been the traditional way of eradicating or controlling for E. decipiens in greenhouses and on crops. Chemical control of E. decipiens can be difficult as many insecticides can also threaten biological control programs already established to protect against other greenhouse pests such as aphids, whiteflies, and leaf miners. Additionally, many insecticides are expensive and difficult to obtain due to their lack of registration as allowable insecticides. Buprofezin, an insect growth regulator, has been proven to effectively control for the leafhopper, and it is of little to no harm to other natural organisms present in greenhouses. But, this insecticide does not affect adult leafhoppers who are then still able to cause notable feeding damage.

=== Biological control ===
==== Predators ====
Orius spp. (minute pirate bugs) are predatory insects that are commonly used as a biological control in greenhouses and against E. decipiens. This form of control is typically unsuccessful in significantly controlling the green leafhopper populations as the leafhopper will hop away when disturbed and are capable of flying, making the chance of a successful capture by a predator such as Orius spp., very difficult. Both the adults and the nymphs exhibit this high mobility which means predatory biological control will not significantly control for a large part of the E. decipiens life cycle.

==== Parasitoids ====
The use of parasitoids is another form of control that has been utilized against E. decipiens. Egg parasitism is beneficial because it stops the production of more green leafhoppers which will prevent future damage of plants. Anagrus atomus is a solitary egg parasitoid of that has been most commonly associated with E. decipiens in many studies. Females of this species will search for eggs with their antennae by sensing for traces of leafhopper activity, such as feeding bumps or oviposition wounds, on plants. When they come across host eggs, they will insert their ovipositor into the egg and lay their own eggs within the host egg.

One study found that the lowest development threshold for A. atomus was found at the temperature 8.28 °C. This temperature is much lower than what is found in many greenhouses where E. decipiens is becoming more predominantly located, therefore the ability of A. atomus to develop at lower temperature thresholds is thought to aid in its effectiveness in controlling the green leafhopper. In the same study, significantly higher numbers of parasitized eggs were found in the stems of plants than in any other parts. This spatial distribution of parasitized eggs corresponds with the preference of egg oviposition in the stems of plants by E. decipiens. The ability of A. atomus to discriminate between infested and non-infested plants, recognize preferences in location for oviposition by E. decipiens, short life cycle, and its ability to parasitize eggs throughout the development of E. decipiens, are all reasons that make A. atomus a parasitoid that may be effective in the biological control for the leafhopper. Additionally, the mean parasitism of A. atomus in this study was 44.7% ranging from 27.2 to 62.5%. However, the low fecundity of A. atomus often results in no significant effect on host population density, and therefore it is considered poor for controlling E. decipiens if the parasitoid is not used in conjunction with other control methods.

==== Virulent fungi ====
Recent studies have shown that certain fungi that is parasitic towards other Empoasca spp. is also parasitic towards Empoasca decipiens. Specifically, the species M. anisopliae, P. fumosoroseus and B. bassiana. One study found that isolates of these fungi species were virulent to both nymphs and adult E. decipiens. All isolates were proven to be highly virulent to fifth instar nymphs where the fungi caused 60-98% mortality 4–6 days after the nymphs were infected. In the treatments where M. anisopliae and B. bassiana were utilized, first instar nymphs were less sensitive to the effects of the fungi compared to older leaf hoppers. This is most likely due to the ability of the younger nymphs to shed the fungal spores through ecdysis. The fungus species P. fumosoroseus was observed to grow more rapidly on E. decipiens cadavers than any of the other fungi tested. It is thought that this characteristic may enhance the virulence of this fungus to first instar nymphs by growing so rapidly it can overcome multiple molts that E. decipiens nymphs undergo. The ability of these fungi to develop in high humidity and moderate temperature environments, in addition to their virulence, make them good potential microbial controls for E. decipiens.

== Subspecies ==
- Empoasca decipiens minutissima Vilbaste, 1961
