= Jacobiasca formosana =

Scientific classification
- Kingdom: Animalia
- Phylum: Arthropoda
- Clade: Pancrustacea
- Class: Insecta
- Order: Hemiptera
- Suborder: Auchenorrhyncha
- Family: Cicadellidae
- Genus: Empoasca
- Species: E. onukii

Binomial name
- Empoasca onukii (Matsuda)

Species of true bug

Jacobiasca formosana
- Chinese: 茶小綠葉蟬
Transcriptions
Standard Mandarin
- Hanyu Pinyin: chá xiǎo lǜ yèchán

Alternative Chinese name
- Chinese: 小綠浮塵子
Transcriptions
Standard Mandarin
- Hanyu Pinyin: Xiǎo lǜ fúchénzi

Second alternative Chinese name
- Chinese: 浮塵仔
Transcriptions
Southern Min
- Hokkien POJ: phû-tîn-á

Empoasca onukii, including the former Jacobiasca formosana and Empoasca vitis, is an insect species belonging to the subfamily Typhlocybinae of the family Cicadellidae. Plant hosts include Gossypium (cotton) species and, notably, Camellia sinensis (Chinese tea plants). The species is distributed throughout East, Southeast, and South Asia (including in China, India, Malaysia, Pakistan, Sri Lanka, Taiwan, and Thailand).

== Names ==
Common names for E. onukii include the small green leafhopper, tea green leafhopper, or tea jassid. In Mandarin Chinese, the insect is referred to as 茶小綠葉蟬 (chá xiǎo lǜ yèchán) or 小綠浮塵子 (xiǎo lǜ fúchénzǐ). In Siyen Hakka, it is called 著涎 (chho̍k-yèn), 著蜒 (chho̍k-yèn), or 著煙 (chho̍k-yên). In Taiwanese, it is 浮塵仔 (phû-tîn-á), 蜒仔 (iân-á), 蝝仔 (iân-á), 烟仔 (ian-á), 趙烟 (tiō-ian), 跳仔 (tiô-á) or 青仔 (chhiⁿ-á).

== Taxonomy ==
It was previously thought that the tea jassids in Japan, Taiwan, and China were three distinct species (Empoasca onukii, Jacobiasca formosana, and Empoasca vitis, respectively). Newer molecular and morphological evidence shows that they are all the same species, Empoasca onukii.

== Description and habits ==
The mature J. formosana are slender and yellowish-green with translucent wings with a body length of about 3 mm (0.1 in).

The adults eat young plant shoots for the nutrient solution within, slowing bud growth and causing yellow-green bud curling. The leaf margins turn brown and eventually fall off.

== Use in tea production ==
Empoasca onukii is important in the production of Taiwan's dongfang meiren tea. The tea, which is an oolong tea with a flavor likened to ripened fruit and honey, is made from leaves that have been fed upon by these insects. The insects, which thrive in warmer, pollution-free environments, suck the phloem juices of the tea stems, leaves, and buds, producing monoterpene diol and hotrienol which give the tea its unique flavor.

This process has inspired makers of other types of tea such as dongding oolong tea and the east coast black teas of Hualien and Taitung to withhold pesticide use in order to replicate this process in other teas. Similar action of jassids and thrips helps form the muscatel-like flavor of India's second flush Darjeeling tea.

== Management strategies ==
To mitigate the impact of Empoasca onukii on tea plants, researchers have explored various eco-friendly control methods, focusing on the use of colored adhesive boards，insect lamps and biological Control. These strategies aim to reduce reliance on chemical pesticides while maintaining effective pest control.

=== Colored adhesive boards ===
Studies have demonstrated that Empoasca onukii exhibits a strong attraction to specific colors, making colored adhesive boards an effective tool for monitoring and controlling leafhopper populations. Zhao Dongxiang et al. found that amber-yellow boards were highly effective in capturing leafhoppers indoors, outperforming other colors such as bright green, snow white, and orange. Field trials confirmed that amber-yellow boards captured the most leafhoppers, followed by emerald green boards.

Further research in tea plantations identified primrose yellow, earthy yellow, and bud green as the most effective colors for trapping leafhoppers, while pure white boards had the lowest capture rate. Optimal deployment of yellow boards at a recommended density has been shown to maximize efficacy.

=== Insect lamps ===
Insect lamps, particularly frequency-vibration (electric shock) and suction types, have gained popularity in tea plantations for their ability to control a wide range of pests. Frequency-vibration lamps are more effective for medium-to-large moths, while suction lamps are better suited for small pests like Empoasca onukii. Recent advancements, such as narrow-spectrum lamps and the integration of pheromone attractants, have shown promising results in improving capture rates.

These integrated pest management strategies not only help control leafhopper populations but also align with sustainable agricultural practices, reducing the environmental impact of tea cultivation.

=== Biological control ===
In tea plantations with well-maintained ecological balance, spiders play a significant role in controlling J. formosana populations, exhibiting a notable follow-effect in response to leafhopper densities. During peak leafhopper outbreaks, spraying tea plantations with Beauveria bassiana formulations in moderately humid conditions can achieve approximately 60% control effectiveness. In high-humidity tea microenvironments like those in Miaoxi, Sichuan, B. bassiana can cause epidemics within J. formosana populations, with infection rates reaching up to 80%. Similarly, in the rainy season of Xishuangbanna, fungal pathogens like Erynia spp. can infect 10–30% of leafhopper populations.

== See also ==
- Leafhoppers
- Camellia sinensis, the Chinese tea plant
- Dongfang meiren tea
