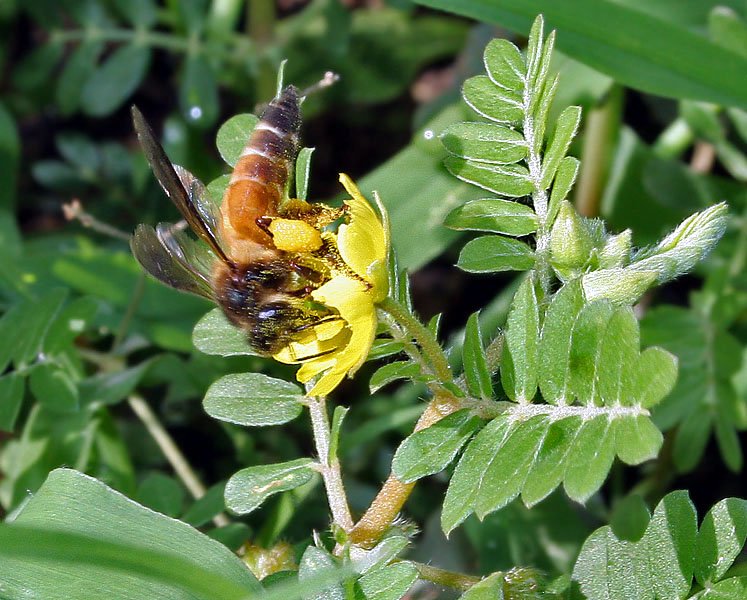
- Apis dorsata (Holometabola) on Tribulus terrestris

Scientific classification
- Kingdom: Animalia
- Phylum: Arthropoda
- Clade: Pancrustacea
- Class: Insecta
- Infraclass: Neoptera
- Clade: Eumetabola; Hennig, 1953

Superorders
- Holometabola; Paraneoptera

= Eumetabola =

Clade of insects

Eumetabola is an unranked clade of Neoptera. According to a phylogenetic analysis, the Eumetabola clade originated 390–350 million years ago, in the Late Devonian.

== Phylogeny ==
The phylogeny of Eumetabola is shown in the cladogram, using the molecular phylogeny of Wipfler et al. 2019 for the Polyneoptera, Johnson et al. 2018 for the Paraneoptera (where Psocomorpha contains Phthiraptera), and Kjer et al. 2016 for the Holometabola.

- Neoptera
  - Polyneoptera
    - - Zoraptera (angel insects)
      - Dermaptera (earwigs)
    - - Plecoptera (stoneflies)
      - - Orthoptera (grasshoppers, crickets, katydids)
        - - - - Grylloblattodea (ice crawlers)
              - Mantophasmatodea (gladiators)
            - - Phasmatodea (stick insects)
              - Embioptera (webspinners)
          - Dictyoptera
            - Mantodea (mantises)
            - Blattodea (cockroaches and termites)
  - Eumetabola
    - Paraneoptera
      - Condylognatha
        - Thysanoptera (thrips)
        - Hemiptera (true bugs)
      - Psocodea (barklice inc. lice)
    - Holometabola (Endopterygota)
      - Hymenoptera (sawflies, wasps)
      - Aparaglossata
        - Neuropteroidea
          - Neuropterida
            - Raphidioptera (snakeflies)
            - - Megaloptera (alderflies and allies)
              - Neuroptera (lacewings and allies)
          - Coleopterida
            - Coleoptera (beetles)
            - Strepsiptera (twisted-wing parasites)
        - Panorpida
          - Amphiesmenoptera
            - Trichoptera (caddisflies)
            - Lepidoptera (butterflies, moths)
          - Antliophora
            - Diptera (true flies)
            - - Mecoptera (scorpionflies)
              - Siphonaptera (fleas)
