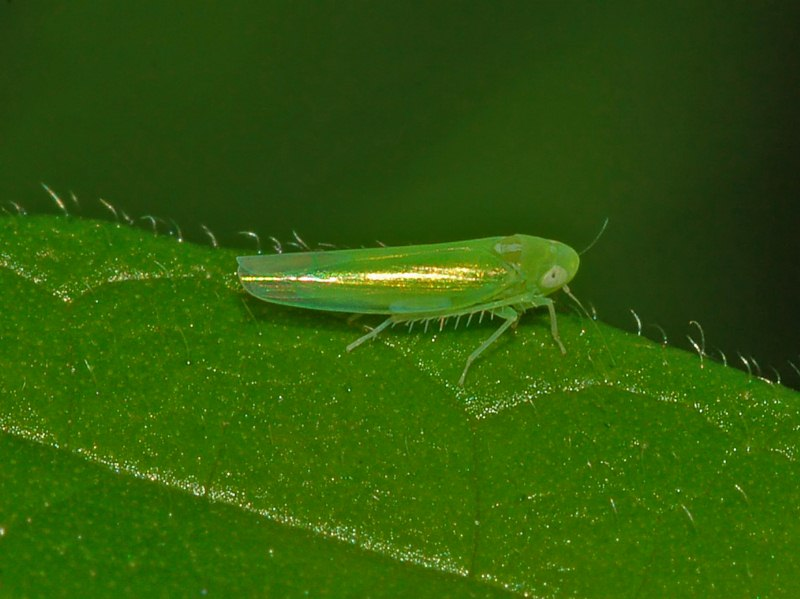
- Empoasca cf. decipiens

Scientific classification
- Domain: Eukaryota
- Kingdom: Animalia
- Phylum: Arthropoda
- Class: Insecta
- Order: Hemiptera
- Suborder: Auchenorrhyncha
- Family: Cicadellidae
- Subfamily: Typhlocybinae
- Tribe: Empoascini
- Genus: Empoasca; Walsh, 1862

= Empoasca =

Genus of true bugs

Empoasca is a genus of leafhoppers belonging to the family Cicadellidae subfamily Typhlocybinae.

== Species ==
- Empoasca abrupta DeLong, 1931
- Empoasca affinis Nast, 1937
- Empoasca alsiosa Ribaut, 1933
- Empoasca apicalis (Flor, 1861)
- Empoasca biloba Qin & Zhang, 2008
- Empoasca canariensis Metcalf, 1955
- Empoasca clypeata Qin & Zhang, 2008
- Empoasca decedens (Paoli, 1932)
- Empoasca decipiens Paoli, 1930
- Empoasca fabae Harris, 1841
- Empoasca irenae Anufriev, 1973
- Empoasca kontkaneni Ossiannilsson, 1949
- Empoasca lybica Bergevin & Zanon, 1922
- Empoasca onukii Matsuda, 1952
- Empoasca ossiannilssoni Nuorteva, 1948
- Empoasca pteridis (Dahlbom, 1850)
- Empoasca punjabensis Singh-Pruthi, 1940
- Empoasca quadrifida Qin & Zhang, 2008
- Empoasca recurvata DeLong, 1931
- Empoasca serrata Vilbaste, 1965
- Empoasca solani (Curtis, 1846)
- Empoasca vitis (Göthe, 1875)
