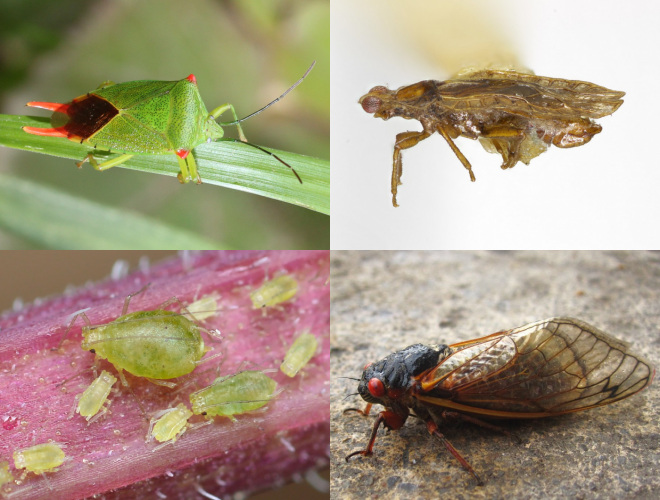
- Species from each of the four suborders of Hemiptera, clockwise from top-left: Acanthosoma labiduroides (Heteroptera), Xenophyes forsteri (Coleorrhyncha), Magicicada septendecim (Auchenorrhyncha), and Aphids (Sternorrhyncha).

Scientific classification
- Kingdom: Animalia
- Phylum: Arthropoda
- Clade: Pancrustacea
- Class: Insecta
- Clade: Eumetabola
- (unranked): Paraneoptera
- Superorder: Condylognatha
- Order: Hemiptera; Linnaeus, 1758

Suborders
- Auchenorrhyncha; Coleorrhyncha; Heteroptera; Sternorrhyncha

= Hemiptera =

Hemiptera Temporal range: Moscovian–Holocene, 307–0 Ma

Order of insects often called true bugs

Hemiptera (/hɛˈmɪptərə/; from Ancient Greek hemipterus 'half-winged') is an order of insects, commonly called true bugs, comprising more than 100,000 species within groups such as the cicadas, aphids, planthoppers, leafhoppers, assassin bugs, bed bugs, and shield bugs. They range in size from 1 mm (0.04 in) to around 15 cm (6 in), and share a common arrangement of piercing-sucking mouthparts. The name "true bugs" is sometimes limited to the suborder Heteroptera.

Most hemipterans feed on plants, using their sucking and piercing mouthparts to extract plant sap. Some are bloodsucking, or hematophagous, while others are predators that feed on insects and other small invertebrates. They live in a wide variety of habitats, generally terrestrial, though some are adapted to life in or on the surface of fresh water (e.g. pondskaters, water boatmen, giant water bugs). Hemipterans are hemimetabolous, with young nymphs that somewhat resemble adults. Many aphids are capable of parthenogenesis, producing young from unfertilised eggs; this helps them to reproduce extremely rapidly in favourable conditions.

Humans have interacted with Hemipterans for millennia. Some species, including many aphids, are significant agricultural pests, damaging crops by sucking the sap. Others harm humans more directly as vectors of serious diseases. The bed bug is a persistent parasite of humans, and some kissing bugs can transmit Chagas disease. Some species have been used for biological control of insect pests or of invasive plants. A few hemipterans have been cultivated for the extraction of dyestuffs such as cochineal and carmine, and for shellac. Cicadas have been used as food, and have appeared in literature since the Iliad in Ancient Greece.

== Etymology ==
The name Hemiptera comes from the Greek words hemi (half) and ptera (wings), meaning "half-wings," since the forewings of many species are hardened and leathery at the base but membranous and somewhat transparent at the tips. Entomologists reserve the term bug for Hemiptera or Heteroptera, which does not include other arthropods or insects of other orders such as ants, bees, beetles, or butterflies. In some varieties of English, all terrestrial arthropods (including non-insect arachnids and myriapods) are colloquially called bugs. (Note: The Museum of New Zealand notes that "in everyday conversation", bug "refers to land arthropods with at least six legs, such as insects, spiders, and centipedes". In a chapter on "Bugs That Are Not Insects", the entomologist Gilbert Walbauer specifies centipedes, millipedes, arachnids (spiders, daddy longlegs, scorpions, mites, chiggers and ticks) as well as the few terrestrial crustaceans (sowbugs and pillbugs), but argues that "including legless creatures such as worms, slugs, and snails among the bugs stretches the word too much". "Bug" is used for a harmful microorganism, typically a bacterium.) Many insects with "bug" in their common name are in other orders; for example, the lovebug is a fly, while the maybug and ladybug are beetles.

== Diversity ==
Hemiptera is the largest order of hemimetabolous insects (not undergoing complete metamorphosis; though some examples such as male scale insects do undergo a form of complete metamorphosis), containing more than 95,000 named species. Other insect orders with more species are all holometabolous, meaning they have a pupal stage and undergo complete metamorphosis. The majority of species are terrestrial, including a number of important agricultural pests, but some are found in freshwater habitats. These are usually members of the Nepomorpha and Gerromorpha infraorders, including water boatmen, backswimmers, pond skaters, velvet water bugs, and giant water bugs. Some terrestrial groups are also found near water, such as shore bugs and toad bugs.

== Taxonomy and phylogeny ==
Hemiptera belong to the insect superorder Paraneoptera, which includes lice (Psocodea), thrips (Thysanoptera), and the true bugs of Hemiptera. Within Paraneoptera, Hemiptera is most closely related to the sister clade Thysanoptera.

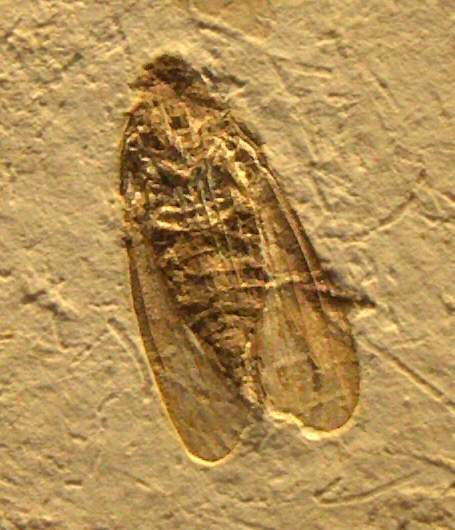
Fossil planthopper (Fulgoromorpha) from the Early Cretaceous Crato Formation of Brazil, c. 116 mya

The fossil record of hemipterans goes back to the Carboniferous (Moscovian). The oldest fossils are of the Archescytinidae from the Lower Permian and are thought to be basal to the Auchenorrhyncha. Fulgoromorpha and Cicadomorpha appear in the Upper Permian, as do Sternorrhyncha of the Psylloidea and Aleyrodoidea. Aphids and Coccoids appear in the Triassic. The Coleorrhyncha extend back to the Lower Jurassic. The Heteroptera first appeared in the Triassic.

The present members of the order Hemiptera (sometimes referred to as Rhynchota) were historically placed into two orders, the so-called Homoptera and Heteroptera/Hemiptera, based on differences in wing structure and the position of the rostrum. "Homoptera" was established as paraphyletic group and an obsolete name.

The order is now divided into four suborders, Heteroptera, Sternorrhyncha, Auchenorrhyncha, and Coleorrhyncha. The earlier work was based on nuclear DNA, but later phylogenetic analysis using mitochondrial DNA suggests that Homoptera may be monophyletic after all, a sister group of Heteroptera. The cause of the disparity in the analyses is suggested to be the long branch attraction effect in phylogenetic analysis, due to rapidly evolving DNA regions.

The cladogram shows Hemiptera's placement within Paraneoptera, as well as how Hemiptera's four suborders are related. English names are given in parentheses where possible.

- Other insects
- Paraneoptera
  - Psocodea
    (barklice, booklice, lice)
  - Condylognatha
    - Thysanoptera (thrips)
    - Hemiptera (true bugs)
      - Sternorrhyncha
        (aphids, scale insects, etc)
      - - Heteroptera
          (shield bugs, assassin bugs, etc)
        - - Coleorrhyncha
            (moss bugs)
          - Auchenorrhyncha
            - Fulgoromorpha (planthoppers)
            - Cicadomorpha (cicadas, leafhoppers, spittlebugs, etc)

Hemiptera suborders
| Suborder | No. of Species | First appearance | Examples | Characteristics |
|---|---|---|---|---|
| Auchenorrhyncha | more than 42,000 | Lower Permian | cicadas, leafhoppers, treehoppers, planthoppers, froghoppers | plant-sucking bugs; many can jump; many make calls, some loud |
| Coleorrhyncha | fewer than 30 | Lower Jurassic | moss bugs (Peloridiidae) | small, rarely observed; found in/feed on moss; evolved before the splitting of Gondwana |
| Heteroptera | more than 45,000 | Triassic | shield bugs, seed bugs, assassin bugs, flower bugs, leaf-footed bugs, water bugs, plant bugs | usually larger bugs; some are predatory, others are plant-sucking |
| Sternorrhyncha | 12,500 | Upper Permian | aphids, whiteflies, scale insects | plant-sucking bugs, some major horticultural pests; most are small and sedentary or fully sessile; |

== Biology ==
=== Mouthparts ===
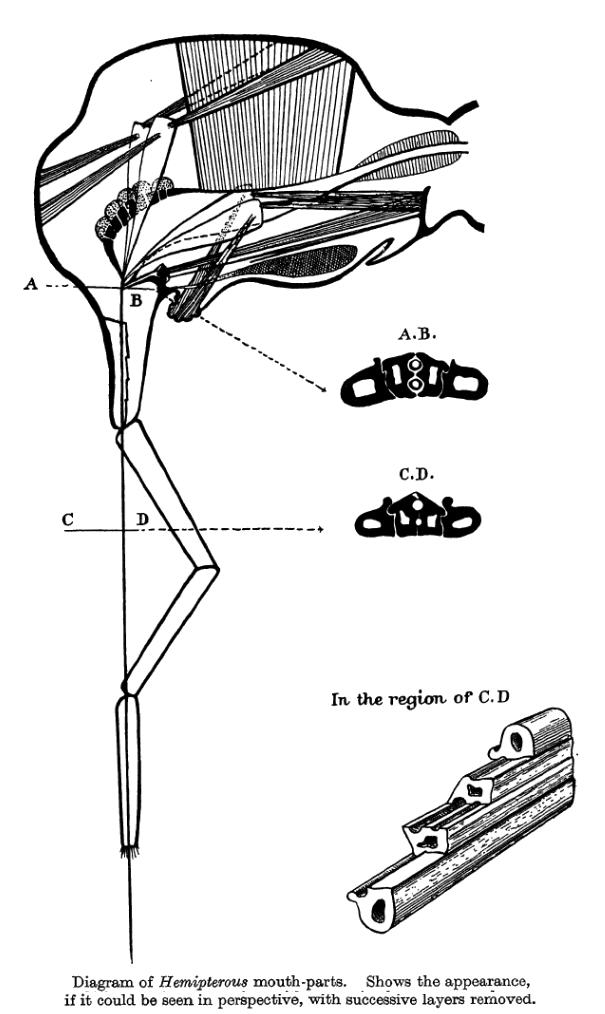
Hemipteran mouthparts are distinctive, with mandibles and maxillae modified to form a piercing "stylet" sheathed within a modified labium.

Large milkweed bug nymph feeding on milkweed before extracting its stylet, sheathing it again in its rostrum.

The defining feature of hemipterans is their rostrum, or "beak," in which the modified mandibles and maxillae form a "stylet" which is sheathed within a modified labium. The stylet is capable of piercing tissues and sucking liquids, while the labium supports it. The stylet contains a channel for the outward movement of saliva and another for the inward movement of liquid food. A salivary pump drives saliva into the prey; a cibarial pump extracts liquid from the prey. Both pumps are powered by substantial dilator muscles in the head. The beak is usually folded under the body when not in use. The diet is typically plant sap, but some hemipterans such as assassin bugs are predators.

Both herbivorous and predatory hemipterans inject enzymes to begin digestion extra-orally (before the food is taken into the body). These enzymes include amylase to hydrolyse starch, polygalacturonase to weaken the tough cell walls of plants, and proteinases to break down proteins.

Although the Hemiptera vary widely in their overall form, their mouthparts form a distinctive "rostrum". Other insect orders with mouthparts modified into anything like the rostrum and stylets of the Hemiptera include some Phthiraptera, but for other reasons they generally are easy to recognize as non-hemipteran. Similarly, the mouthparts of Siphonaptera, some Diptera and Thysanoptera superficially resemble the rostrum of the Hemiptera, but on closer inspection the differences are considerable. Aside from the mouthparts, various other insects can be confused with Hemiptera, but they all have biting mandibles and maxillae instead of the rostrum. Examples include cockroaches and psocids, both of which have longer, many-segmented antennae, and some beetles, but these have fully hardened forewings which do not overlap.

=== Wing structure ===
The forewings of Hemiptera are either entirely membranous, as in the Sternorrhyncha and Auchenorrhyncha, or partially hardened, as in most Heteroptera. The name "Hemiptera" is from the Greek ἡμι- (hemi; "half") and πτερόν (pteron; "wing"), referring to the forewings of many heteropterans which are hardened near the base, but membranous at the ends. Wings modified in this manner are termed hemelytra (singular: hemelytron), by analogy with the completely hardened elytra of beetles, and occur only in the suborder Heteroptera. In all suborders, the hindwings – if present at all – are entirely membranous and usually shorter than the forewings. The forewings may be held "roofwise" over the body (typical of Sternorrhyncha and Auchenorrhyncha), or held flat on the back, with the ends overlapping (typical of Heteroptera). The antennae in Hemiptera typically consist of four or five segments, although they can still be quite long, and the tarsi of the legs have two or three segments.

=== Sound production ===
Many hemipterans can produce sound for communication. The "song" of male cicadas, the loudest of any insect, is produced by tymbal organs on the underside of the abdomen, and is used to attract mates. The tymbals are drumlike disks of cuticle, which are clicked in and out repeatedly, making a sound in the same way as popping the metal lid of a jam jar in and out.

Stridulatory sounds are produced among the aquatic Corixidae and Notonectidae (backswimmers) using tibial combs rubbed across rostral ridges.

=== Life cycle ===
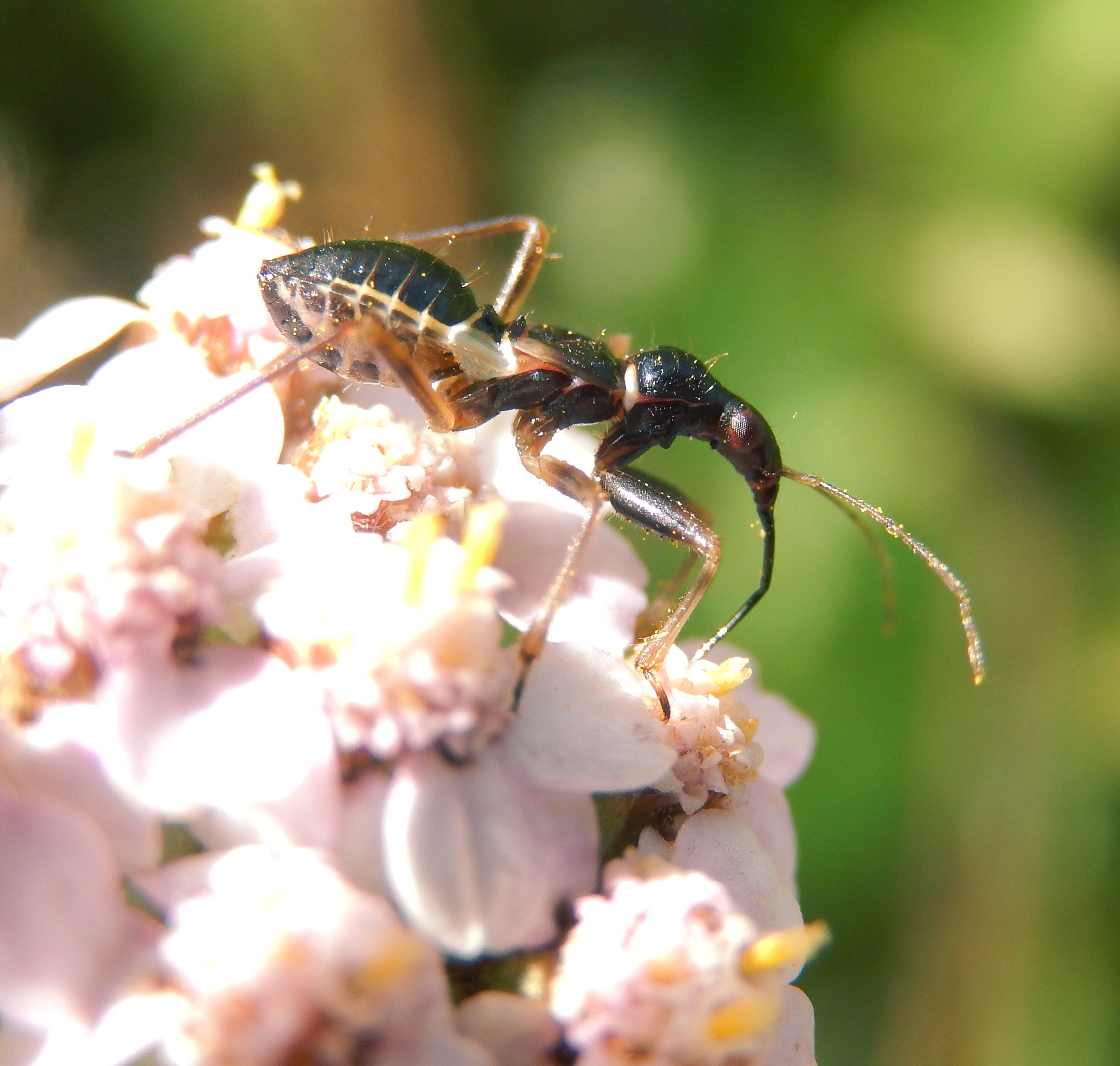
An ant-mimicking predatory bug Myrmecoris gracilis

Hemipterans are hemimetabolous, meaning that they do not undergo metamorphosis, the complete change of form between a larval phase and an adult phase. Instead, their young are called nymphs, and resemble the adults to a greater or lesser degree. The nymphs moult several times as they grow, and each instar resembles the adult more than the previous one. Wing buds grow in later stage nymphs; the final transformation involves little more than the development of functional wings (if they are present at all) and functioning sexual organs, with no intervening pupal stage as in holometabolous insects.

==== Parthenogenesis and viviparity ====
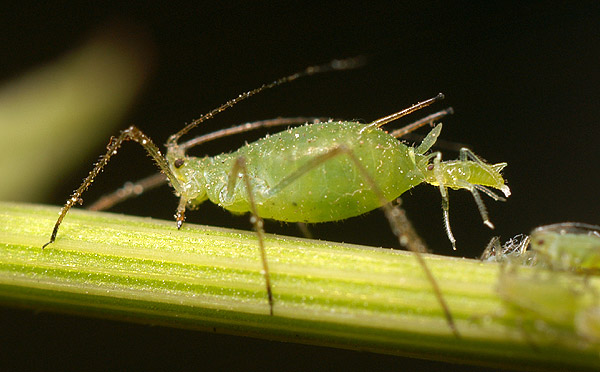
Aphid giving birth to live female young

Many aphids are parthenogenetic during part of the life cycle, such that females can produce unfertilized eggs, which are clones of their mother. All such young are females (thelytoky), so 100% of the population at these times can produce more offspring. Many species of aphid are also viviparous: the young are born live rather than laid as eggs. These adaptations enable aphids to reproduce extremely rapidly when conditions are suitable.

== Locomotion ==
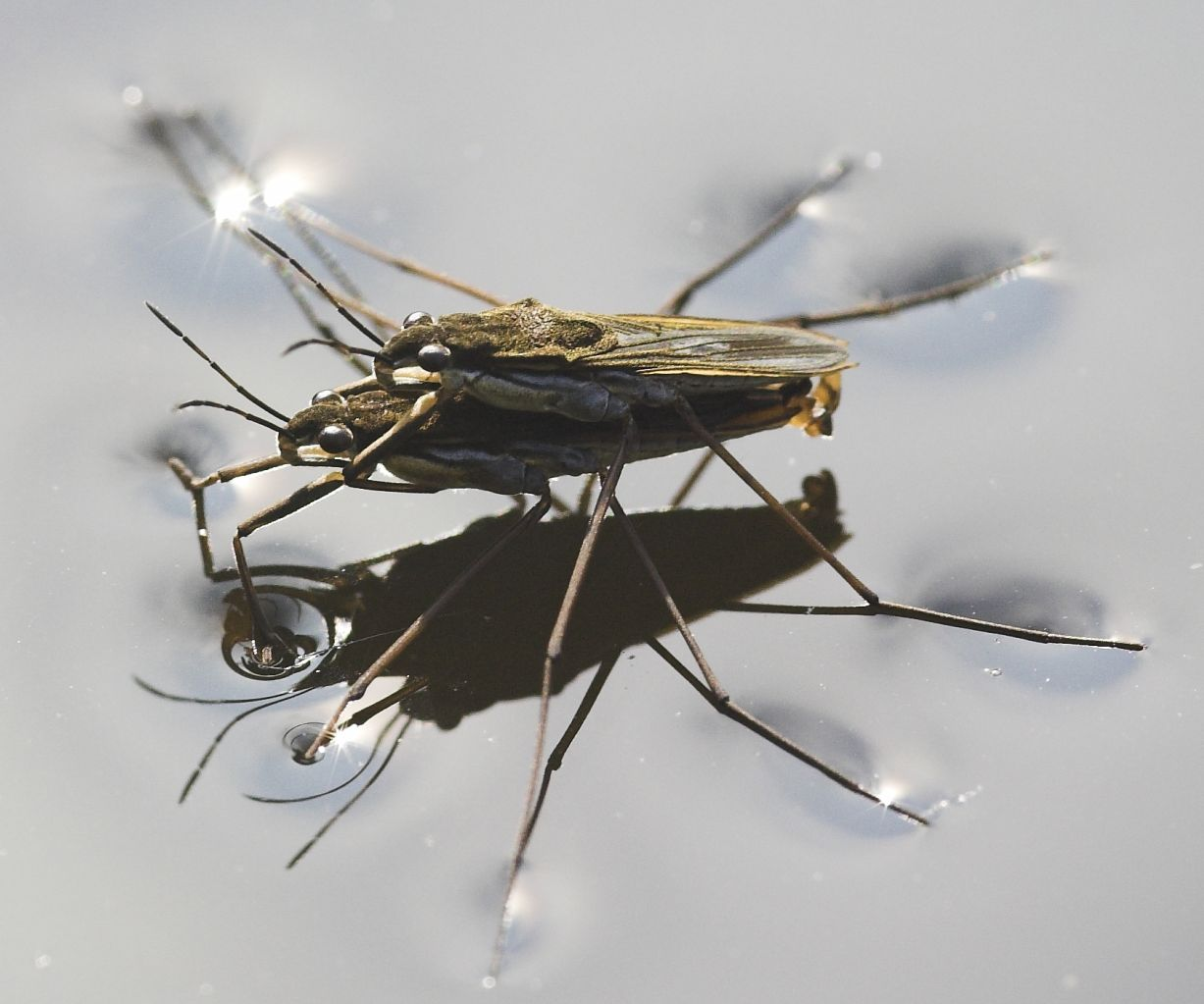
Pondskaters are adapted to use surface tension to keep above a freshwater surface.

Hemipterans make use of a variety of modes of locomotion including swimming, skating on a water surface and jumping, as well as walking and flying like other insects.

=== Swimming and skating ===
Several families of Heteroptera are water bugs, adapted to an aquatic lifestyle, such as the water boatmen (Corixidae), water scorpions (Nepidae), and backswimmers (Notonectidae). They are mostly predatory, and have legs adapted as paddles to help the animal move through the water. The pondskaters or water striders (Gerridae) are also associated with water, but use the surface tension of standing water to keep them above the surface; they include the sea skaters in the genus Halobates, the only truly marine group of insects.

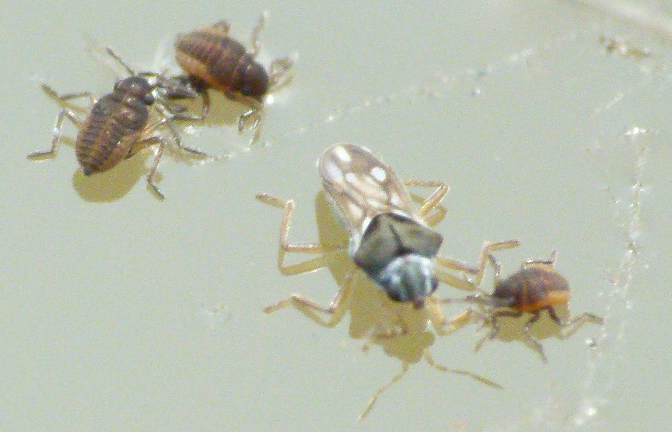
Adult and nymph Microvelia water bugs using Marangoni propulsion

=== Marangoni propulsion ===
Marangoni effect propulsion exploits the change in surface tension when a soap-like surfactant is released on to a water surface, in the same way that a toy soap boat propels itself. Water bugs in the genus Microvelia (Veliidae) can travel at up to 17 cm/s, twice as fast as they can walk, by this means.

=== Flight ===
Flight is well developed in the Hemiptera although mostly used for short distance movement and dispersal. Wing development is sometimes related to environmental conditions. In some groups of Hemiptera, there are variations of winged, short-winged (brachypterous), and wingless (apterous) forms within a single species. This kind of polymorphism tends to be helpful when habitats are temporary with more energy put into reproduction when food is available and into dispersal through flight when food becomes scarce. In aphids, both winged and wingless forms occur with winged forms produced in greater numbers when food resources are depleted. Aphids and whiteflies can sometimes be transported very long distances by atmospheric updrafts and high altitude winds. Wing-length polymorphism is notably rare in tree-living Hemiptera.

=== Jumping ===
Many Auchenorrhyncha including representatives of the cicadas, leafhoppers, treehoppers, planthoppers, and froghoppers are adapted for jumping (saltation). Treehoppers, for example, jump by rapidly depressing their hind legs. Before jumping, the hind legs are raised and the femora are pressed tightly into curved indentations in the coxae. Treehoppers can attain a take-off velocity of up to 2.7 metres per second and an acceleration of up to 250 g. The instantaneous power output is much greater than that of normal muscle, implying that energy is stored and released to catapult the insect into the air. Cicadas, which are much larger, extend their hind legs for a jump in under a millisecond, again implying elastic storage of energy for sudden release.

=== Sedentary ===
Instead of relying on any form of locomotion, most Sternorrhyncha females are sedentary or completely sessile, attached to their host plants by their thin feeding stylets which cannot be taken out of the plant quickly.

== Ecological roles ==
=== Feeding modes ===
==== Herbivores ====
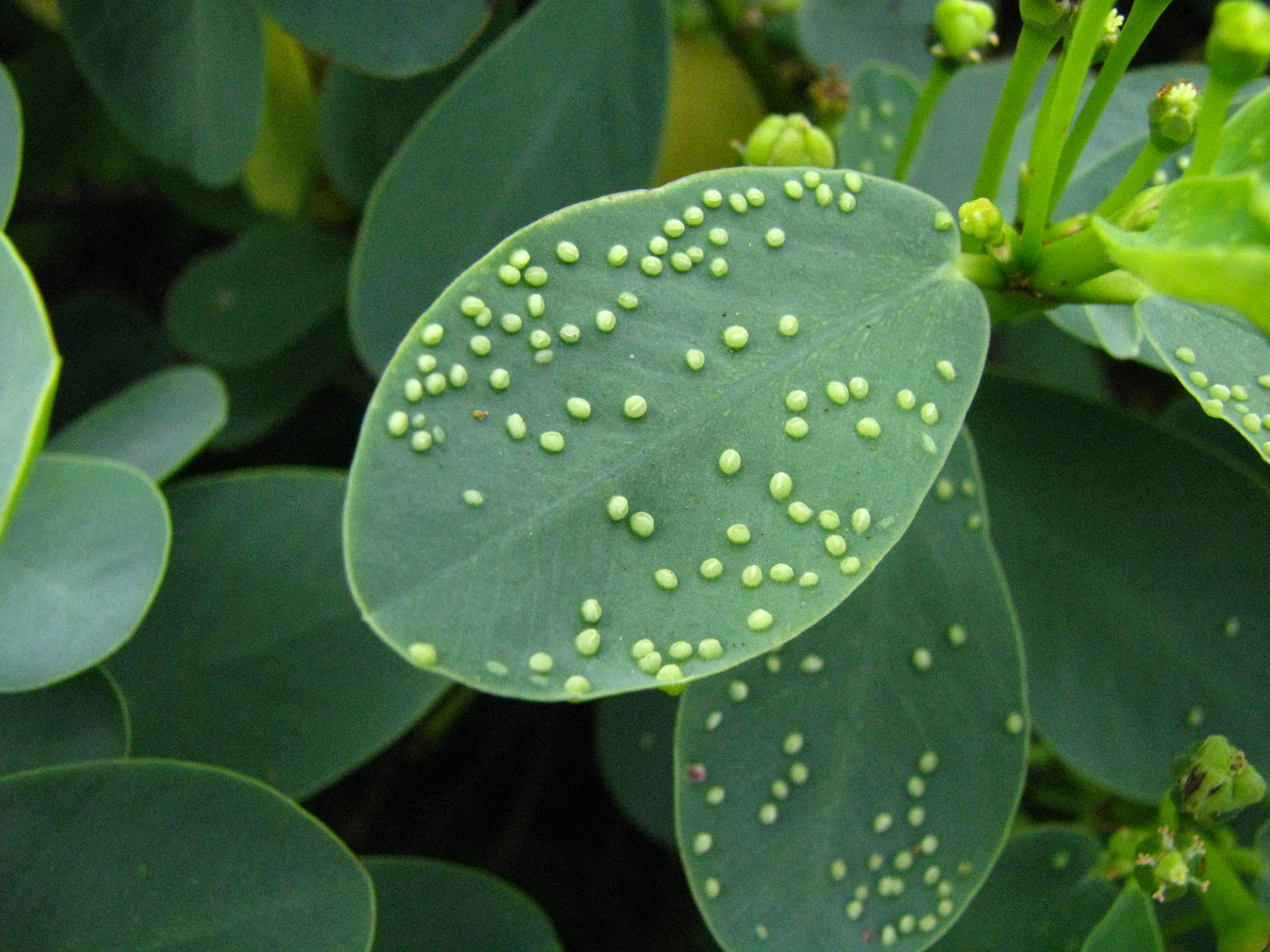
Leaf galls formed by plant lice (Psyllidae), Chamaesyce celastroides var. stokesii

Most hemipterans are phytophagous, using their sucking and piercing mouthparts to feed on plant sap. These include cicadas, leafhoppers, treehoppers, planthoppers, froghoppers, aphids, whiteflies, scale insects, and some other groups. Some are monophages, being host specific and only found on one plant taxon, others are oligophages, feeding on a few plant groups, while others again are less discriminating polyphages and feed on many species of plant. The relationship between hemipterans and plants appears to be ancient, with piercing and sucking of plants evident in the Early Devonian period.

Hemipterans can dramatically cut the mass of affected plants, especially in major outbreaks. They sometimes also change the mix of plants by predation on seeds or feeding on roots of certain species. Some sap-suckers move from one host to another at different times of year. Many aphids spend the winter as eggs on a woody host plant and the summer as parthenogenetically reproducing females on a herbaceous plant.

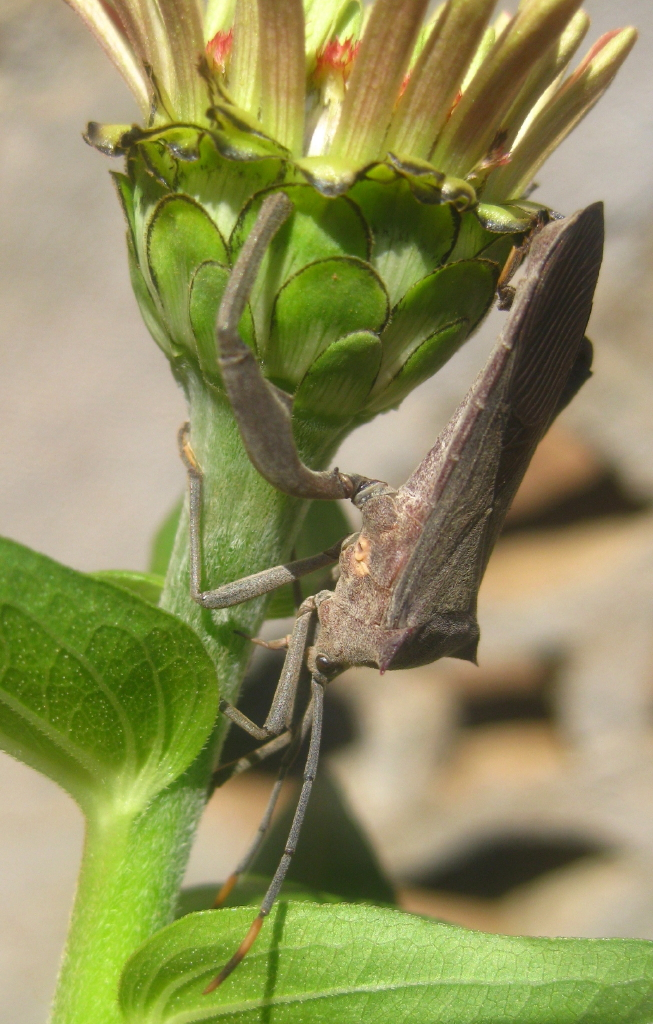
A twig wilting bug (Coreidae) piercing and sucking sap from a Zinnia

Phloem sap, which has a higher concentration of sugars and nitrogen, is under positive pressure unlike the more dilute xylem sap. Most of the Sternorrhyncha and a number of Auchenorrhynchan groups feed on phloem. Phloem feeding is common in the Fulgoromorpha, most Cicadellidae and in the Heteroptera.

The Typhlocybine cicadellids specialize in feeding on non-vascular mesophyll tissue of leaves, which is more nutritious than the leaf epidermis. Most Heteroptera also feed on mesophyll tissue where they are more likely to encounter defensive secondary plant metabolites which often leads to the evolution of host specificity.

Obligate xylem feeding is a special habit that is found in the Auchenorrhyncha among Cicadoidea, Cercopoidea and in Cicadelline cicadellids. Some phloem feeders may take to xylem sap facultatively, especially when facing dehydration. Xylem feeders tend to be polyphagous; to overcome the negative pressure of xylem requires a special cibarial pump.

Phloem feeding hemiptera typically have symbiotic micro-organisms in their gut that help to convert amino acids. Phloem feeders produce honeydew from their anus. A variety of organisms that feed on honeydew form symbiotic associations with phloem-feeders. Phloem sap is a sugary liquid low in amino acids, so insects have to process large quantities to meet their nutritional requirements. Xylem sap is even lower in amino acids and contains monosaccharides rather than sucrose, as well as organic acids and minerals. No digestion is required (except for the hydrolysis of sucrose) and 90% of the nutrients in the xylem sap can be utilised. Some phloem sap feeders selectively mix phloem and xylem sap to control the osmotic potential of the liquid consumed.

A striking adaptation to a very dilute diet is found in many hemipterans: a filter chamber, a part of the gut looped back on itself as a countercurrent exchanger, which permits nutrients to be separated from excess water. The residue, mostly water with sugars and amino acids, is quickly excreted as sticky honeydew, notably from aphids but also from other Auchenorrhycha and Sternorrhyncha.

Some Sternorrhyncha including Psyllids and some aphids are gall formers. These sap-sucking hemipterans inject fluids containing plant hormones into the plant tissues inducing the production of tissue that covers to protects the insect and also act as sinks for nutrition that they feed on. The hackberry gall psyllid for example, causes a woody gall on the leaf petioles of the hackberry tree it infests, and the nymph of another psyllid produces a protective lerp out of hardened honeydew.

==== Predators ====
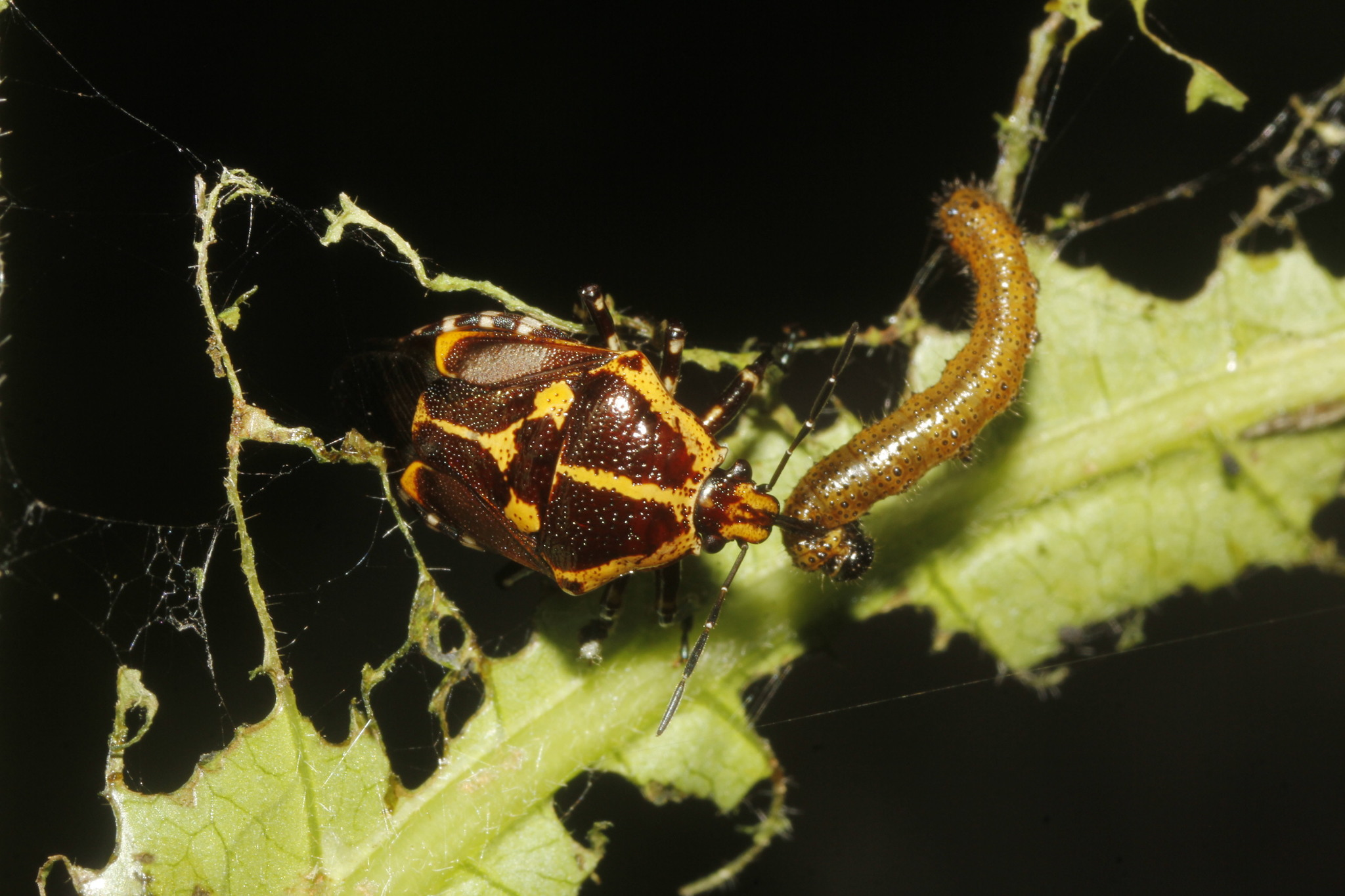
Oplomus dichrous, a predatory stink bug, preying on a caterpillar.

Most other hemipterans are predatory, feeding on other insects, or even small vertebrates. This is true of many aquatic species which are predatory, either as nymphs or adults. Some predatory species are members of usually phytophagous groups, such as predatory stink bugs, which stab soft-bodied insects with their beaks to sucks out the body fluids. The saliva of predatory heteropterans contains digestive enzymes such as proteinase and phospholipase, and in some species also amylase. The mouthparts of these insects are adapted for predation. There are toothed stylets on the mandibles able to cut into and abrade tissues of their prey. There are further stylets on the maxillae, adapted as tubular canals to inject saliva and to extract the pre-digested and liquified contents of the prey.

==== Haematophagic ectoparasites ====
A few hemipterans are haematophagic ectoparasites, feeding on the blood of larger animals. These include bedbugs and the triatomine kissing bugs of the assassin bug family Reduviidae, which can transmit the dangerous Chagas disease. The first known hemipteran to feed in this way on vertebrates was the extinct assassin bug Triatoma dominicana found fossilized in amber and dating back about twenty million years. Faecal pellets fossilised beside it show that it transmitted a disease-causing Trypanosoma and the amber included hairs of the likely host, a bat.

=== As symbionts ===
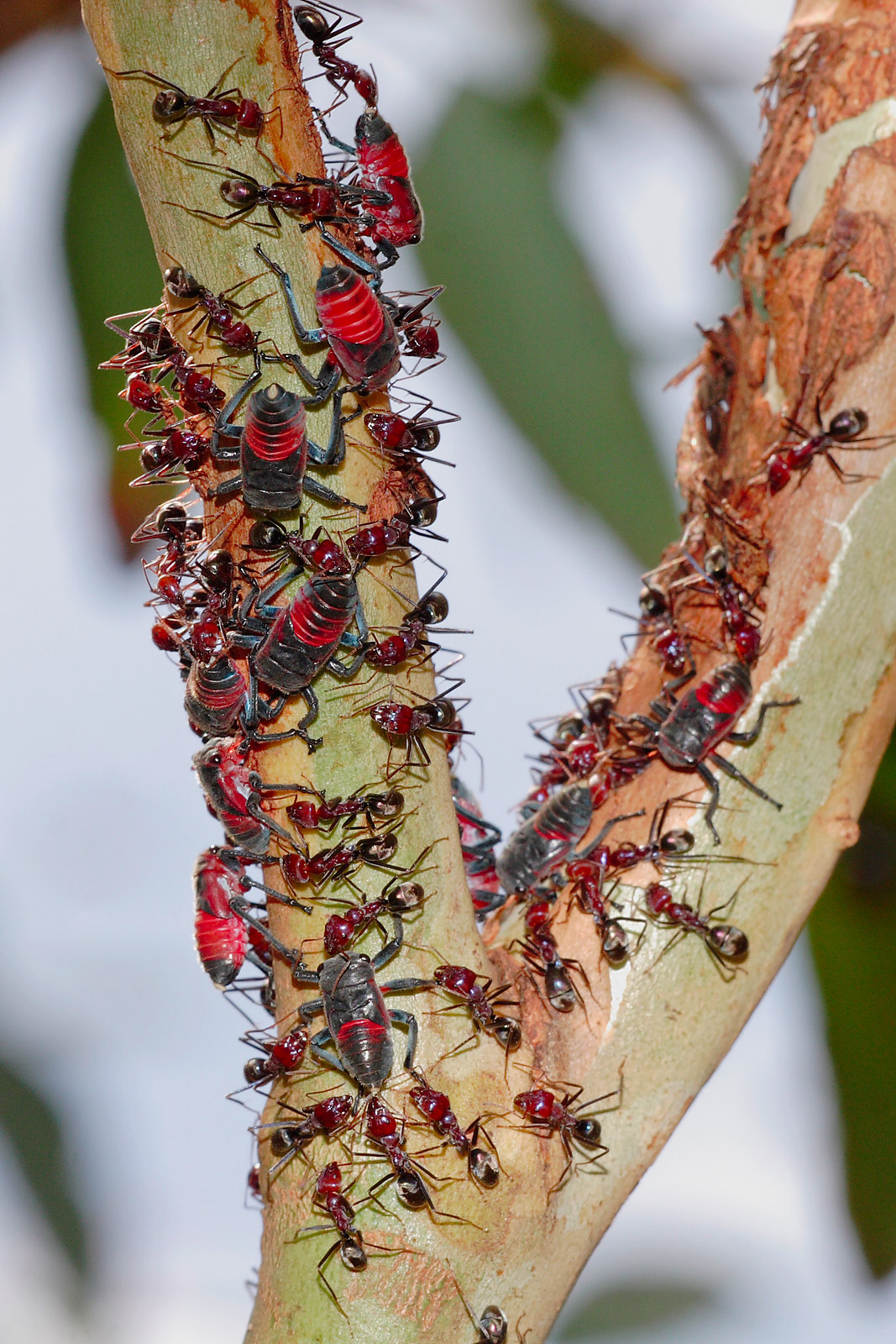
Leafhoppers protected by meat ants

Some species of ant protect and farm aphids (Sternorrhyncha) and other sap-sucking hemipterans, gathering and eating the honeydew that these hemipterans secrete. The relationship is mutualistic, as both ant and aphid benefit. Ants such as the yellow anthill ant, Lasius flavus, breed aphids of at least four species, Geoica utricularia, Tetraneura ulmi, Forda marginata and Forda formicaria, taking eggs with them when they found a new colony; in return, these aphids are obligately associated with the ant, breeding mainly or wholly asexually inside anthills. Ants may also protect the plant bugs from their natural enemies, removing the eggs of predatory beetles and preventing access by parasitic wasps.

Some leafhoppers (Auchenorrhyncha) are similarly "milked" by ants. In the Corcovado rain forest of Costa Rica, wasps compete with ants to protect and milk leafhoppers; the leafhoppers preferentially give more honeydew, more often, to the wasps, which are larger and may offer better protection.

=== As defended prey ===
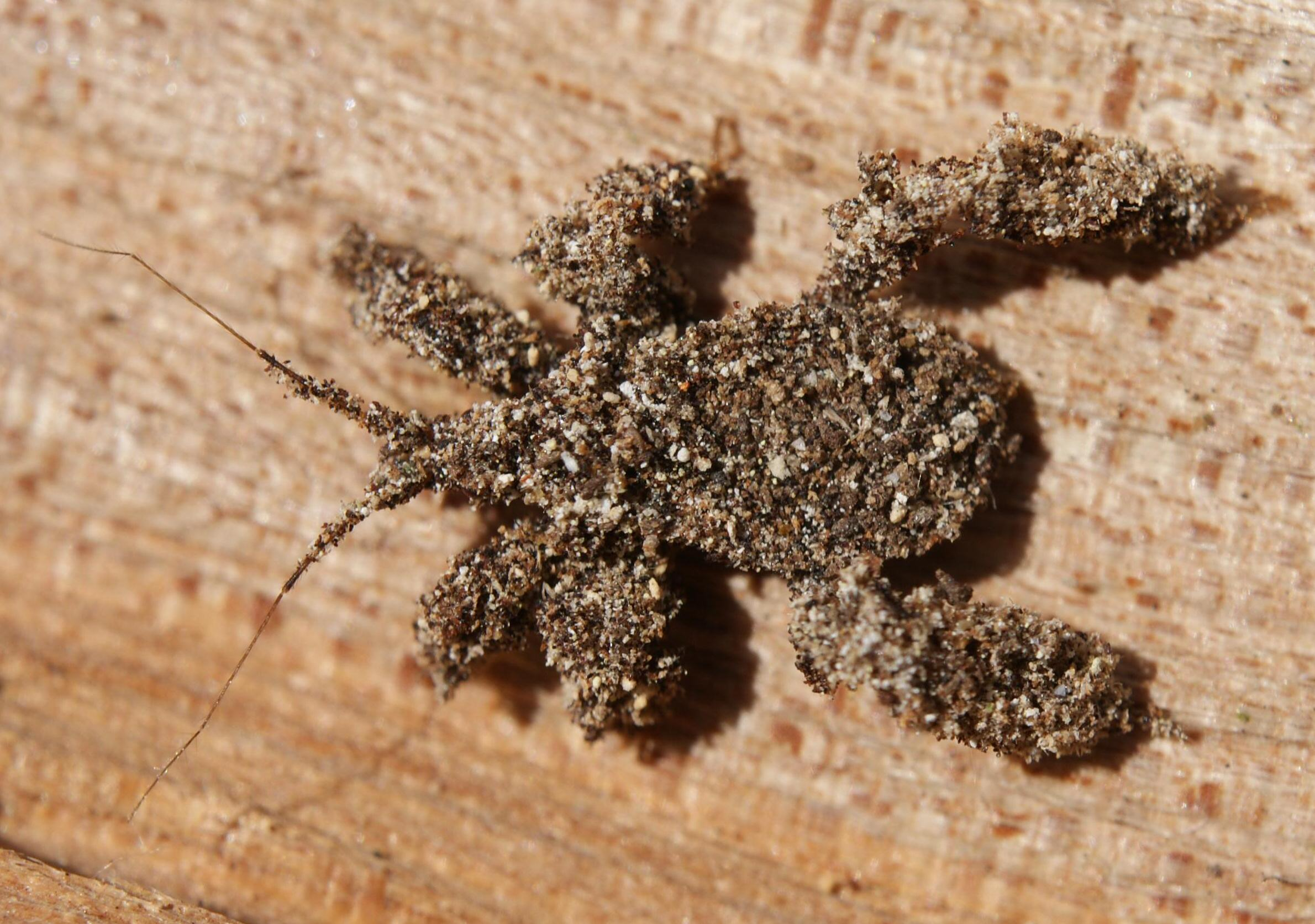
Masked hunter nymph has camouflaged itself with sand grains.

Hemiptera form prey to predators including vertebrates, such as birds, and other invertebrates such as ladybirds. In response, hemipterans have evolved antipredator adaptations. Ranatra may feign death (thanatosis). Others such as Carpocoris purpureipennis secrete toxic fluids to ward off arthropod predators; some Pentatomidae such as Dolycoris are able to direct these fluids at an attacker. Toxic cardenolide compounds are accumulated by the heteropteran Oncopeltus fasciatus when it consumes milkweeds, while the coreid stinkbug Amorbus rubiginosus acquires 2-hexenal from its food plant, Eucalyptus. Some long-legged bugs mimic twigs, rocking to and fro to simulate the motion of a plant part in the wind. The nymph of the masked hunter bug camouflages itself with sand grains, using its hind legs and tarsal fan to form a double layer of grains, coarser on the outside. The Amazon rain forest cicada Hemisciera maculipennis displays bright red deimatic flash coloration on its hindwings when threatened; the sudden contrast helps to startle predators, giving the cicada time to escape. The coloured patch on the hindwing is concealed at rest by an olive green patch of the same size on the forewing, enabling the insect to switch rapidly from cryptic to deimatic behaviour. (Note: The green/red flash coloration earns the insect the name of stop and go cicada.)

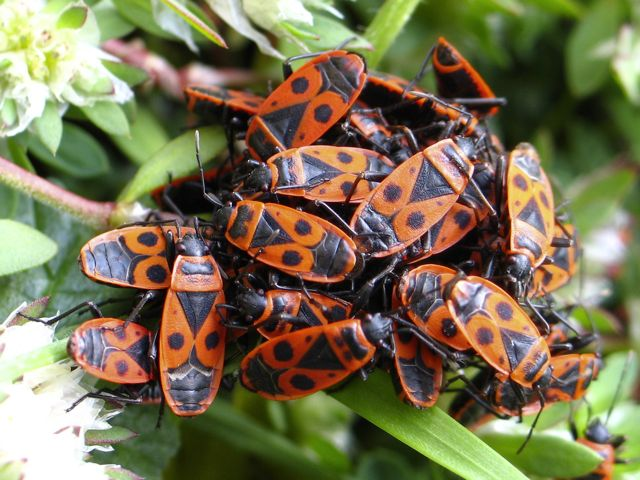
Firebugs, Pyrrhocoris apterus, protect themselves from predators with bright aposematic warning coloration, and by aggregating in a group.

Some hemipterans such as firebugs have bold aposematic warning coloration, often red and black, which appear to deter passerine birds. Many hemipterans including aphids, scale insects and especially the planthoppers secrete wax to protect themselves from threats such as fungi, parasitoidal insects and predators, as well as abiotic factors like desiccation. Hard waxy coverings are especially important in the sedentary Sternorrhyncha such as scale insects, which have no means of escaping from predators; other Sternorrhyncha evade detection and attack by creating and living inside plant galls. Nymphal Cicadoidea and Cercopoidea have glands attached to the Malpighian tubules in their proximal segment that produce mucopolysaccharides, which form the froth around spittlebugs, offering a measure of protection.

Parental care is found in many species of Hemiptera especially in members of the Membracidae and numerous Heteroptera. In many species of shield bug, females stand guard over their egg clusters to protect them from egg parasitoids and predators. In the aquatic Belostomatidae, females lay their eggs on the back of the male which guards the eggs. Protection provided by ants is common in the Auchenorrhyncha.

== Interaction with humans ==
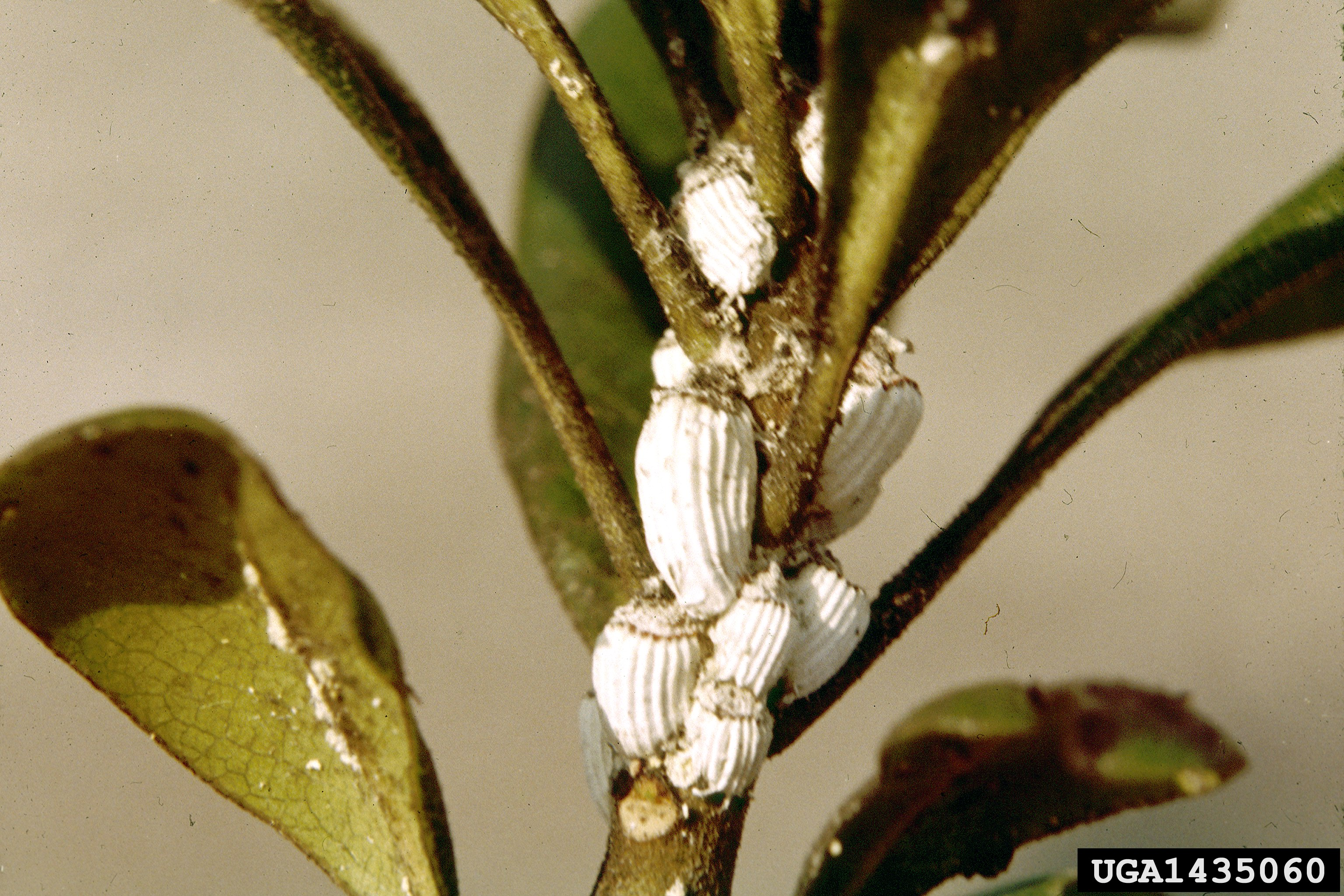
Colony of cottony cushion scale, a pest of citrus fruits

=== As pests ===
Although many species of Hemiptera are significant pests of crops and garden plants, including many species of aphid and scale insects, other species are harmless. The damage done is often not so much the deprivation of the plant of its sap, but the fact that they transmit serious viral diseases between plants. They often produce copious amounts of honeydew which encourages the growth of sooty mould. Significant pests include the cottony cushion scale, a pest of citrus fruit trees, the green peach aphid and other aphids which attack crops worldwide and transmit diseases, and jumping plant lice which can be plant-specific and transmit diseases, as with the Asian citrus psyllid which transmits citrus greening disease.

=== For pest control ===
Spined soldier bug eggs and then the recently hatched first instar bugs

Members of the families Reduviidae, Phymatidae and Nabidae are obligate predators. Some predatory species are used in biological pest control; these include various nabids, and even some members of families that are primarily phytophagous, such as the genus Geocoris in the family Geocoridae. Other hemipterans are omnivores, alternating between a plant-based and an animal-based diet. For example, Dicyphus hesperus is used to control whitefly on tomatoes but also sucks sap, and if deprived of plant tissues will die even if in the presence of whiteflies.

The spined soldier bug (Podisus maculiventris) sucks body fluids from several pests including the larvae of the Colorado beetle and the Mexican bean beetle.

=== Insect products ===
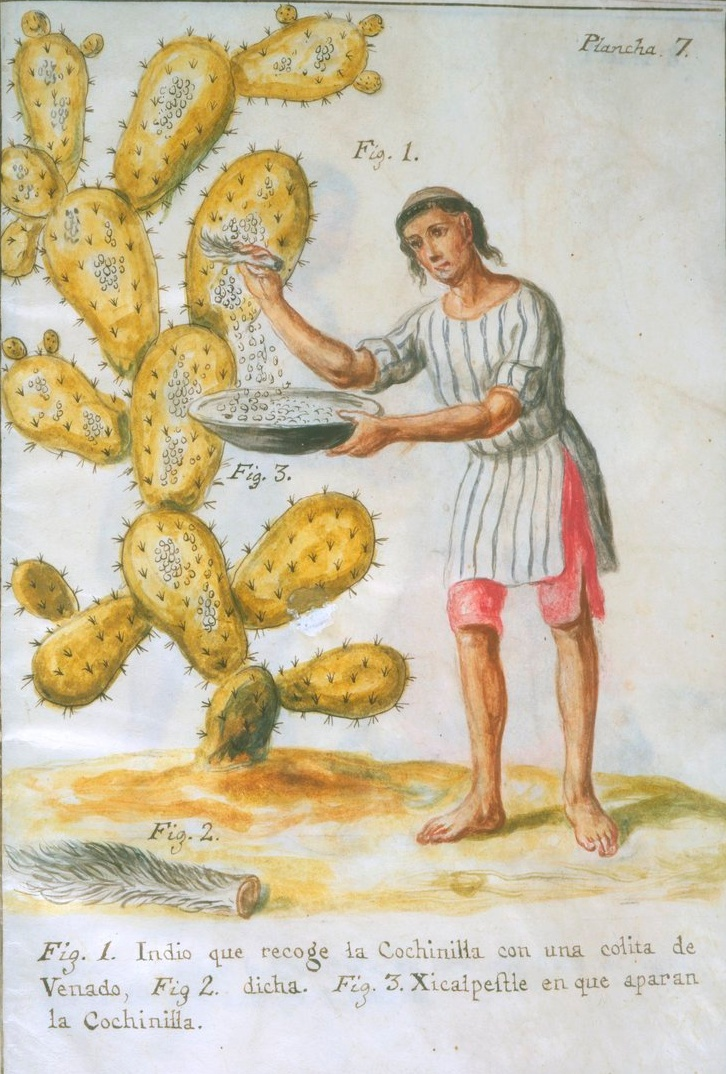
Cochineal scale insects being collected from a prickly pear in Central America. Illustration by José Antonio de Alzate y Ramírez, 1777

Other hemipterans have positive uses for humans, such as in the production of the dyestuff carmine (cochineal). The FDA has created guidelines for how to declare when it has been added to a product. The scale insect Dactylopius coccus produces the brilliant red-coloured carminic acid to deter predators. Up to 100,000 scale insects need to be collected and processed to make a kilogram (2.2 lbs) of cochineal dye. A similar number of lac bugs are needed to make a kilogram of shellac, a brush-on colourant and wood finish. Additional uses of this traditional product include the waxing of citrus fruits to extend their shelf-life, and the coating of pills to moisture-proof them, provide slow-release or mask the taste of bitter ingredients.

=== As human parasites and disease vectors ===
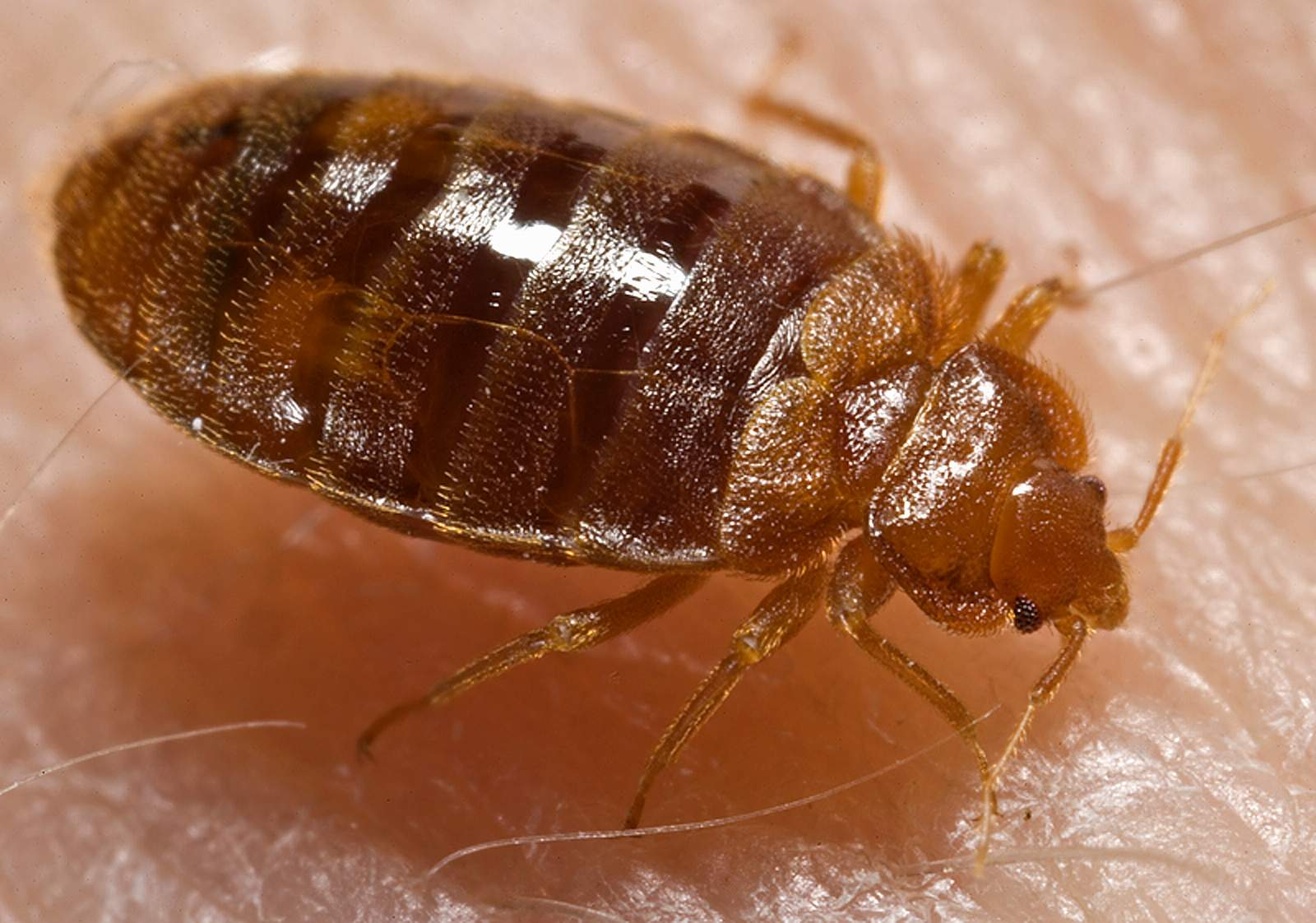
Bed bug nymph, Cimex lectularius, engorged with human blood

Chagas disease is a modern-day tropical disease caused by Trypanosoma cruzi and transmitted by kissing bugs, so-called because they suck human blood from around the lips while a person sleeps.

The bed bug, Cimex lectularius, is an external parasite of humans. It lives in bedding and is mainly active at night, feeding on human blood, generally without being noticed. Bed bugs mate by traumatic insemination; the male pierces the female's abdomen and injects his sperm into a secondary genital structure, the spermalege. The sperm travel in the female's blood (haemolymph) to sperm storage structures (seminal conceptacles); they are released from there to fertilise her eggs inside her ovaries.

=== As food ===
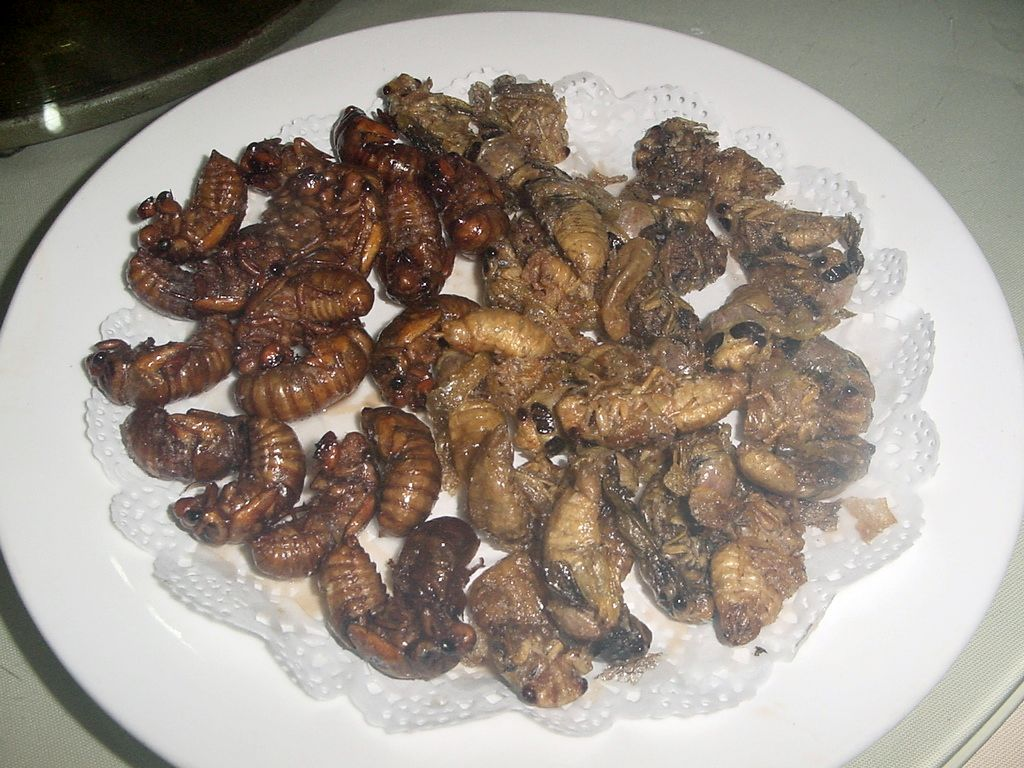
Deep-fried cicadas, Cryptotympana atrata, in Chinese Shandong cuisine

The consumption of insects as a part of the human diet is called entomophagy. Some larger hemipterans such as cicadas are used as food in Asian countries such as China, and they are much esteemed in Malawi and other African countries. Insects have a high protein content and good food conversion ratios, but most hemipterans are too small to be a useful component of the human diet. At least nine species of Hemiptera are eaten worldwide.

=== Depictions in art and literature ===
Cicadas have featured in literature since the time of Homer's Iliad, and as motifs in decorative art from the Chinese Shang dynasty (1766–1122 B.C.). They are described by Aristotle in his History of Animals and by Pliny the Elder in his Natural History; their mechanism of sound production is mentioned by Hesiod in his poem Works and Days "when the Skolymus flowers, and the tuneful Tettix sitting on his tree in the weary summer season pours forth from under his wings his shrill song".

=== In mythology and folklore ===
Among the bugs, cicadas in particular have been used as money, in folk medicine, to forecast the weather, to provide song (in China), and in folklore and myths around the world.

=== Threats ===
Large-scale cultivation of the oil palm Elaeis guineensis in the Amazon basin damages freshwater habitats and reduces the diversity of aquatic and semi-aquatic Heteroptera. Climate change may be affecting the global migration of hemipterans including the potato leafhopper, Empoasca fabae. Warming is correlated with the severity of potato leafhopper infestation, so increased warming may worsen infestations in future.
