= Ultrasound avoidance =

Animal reflex to escape or avoid echolocating predators

Ultrasound avoidance is an escape or avoidance reflex displayed by certain animal species that are preyed upon by echolocating predators. Ultrasound avoidance is known for several groups of insects that have independently evolved mechanisms for ultrasonic hearing. Insects have evolved a variety of ultrasound-sensitive ears based upon a vibrating tympanic membrane tuned to sense the bat's echolocating calls. The ultrasonic hearing is coupled to a motor response that causes evasion of the bat during flight.

Although ultrasonic signals are used for echolocation by toothed whales, no known examples of ultrasonic avoidance in their prey have been found to date.

Ultrasonic hearing has evolved multiple times in insects: a total of 19 times. Bats appeared in the Eocene era, (about 50 million years ago); anti-bat tactics should have evolved then. Antibat tactics are known in four orders of Insecta: moths (Lepidoptera), crickets (Orthoptera), mantises (Dictyoptera), and green lacewings (Neuroptera). There are hypotheses of ultrasound avoidance being present in Diptera (flies) and Coleoptera (beetles).

== Ultrasound avoidance in moths ==
The idea that moths were able to hear the cries of echolocating bats dates back to the late 19th century. F. Buchanan White, in an 1877 letter to Nature made the association between the moth's high-pitched sounds and the high-pitched bat calls and wondered whether the moths would be able to hear it. However, it was not until the early 1960s that Kenneth Roeder et al. made the first electrophysiological recordings of a noctuid moth's auditory nerve and were able to confirm this suspicion.

Later research showed that moths responded to ultrasound with evasive movements. Moths, as do crickets and most insects that display bat avoidance behaviors, have tympanic organs that display phonotactic and directional hearing; they fly away from the source of the sound and will only have the diving behavior considered above when the sound is too loud—or when, in a natural setting, the bat would be presumably too close to simply fly away.

It was found that the moths' responses vary according to ultrasound intensity, diving towards the ground if the pulse was of a high amplitude or flying directly away from the sound source if the sound amplitude was low (if the sound was softer). Acoustic sensory receptors in noctuid moths are mechanoreceptors located in a chamber formed by the wall of the abdomen and the tympanic membrane, and they are most sensitive to lower frequencies of ultrasound (between 20 and 30 kHz.).

The moth's body axis allows it to be more sensitive to sounds coming from particular directions. Their ears, on either side of the metathorax, have two sensory cells within the membranes. Though the tuning curves of these cells are identical, the sensitivity thresholds differ, allowing for sound localization and a wider range of sensitivity to sound. The movement of the wings during flight also plays a role, since sound thresholds change with wing position. The neural mechanisms for triggering the acoustic startle response are partially understood. However, there is little known about the motor control of flight that ultrasound initiates.

Further research has shown that many species of moths are sensitive to ultrasound. Sensitivities for ultrasound change according to the environment the moth thrives in, and the moth can even change its own sensitivity if it is preyed upon by bats with different echolocating calls. Such is the case of the Australian noctuid moth, Speiredonia spectans, which adapts its acoustic sensitivity according to the characteristics of the call of the bat inside the cave with them.

== Ultrasound avoidance in crickets ==
An adult male and a juvenile male of the species Gryllus bimaculatus

Crickets are preyed on by bats during the night while they fly from one place to another. Avoidance behaviors by crickets were first reported in 1977 by A. V. Popov and V. F. Shuvalov. They also demonstrated that crickets, like moths, fly away from bats once they've heard their echolocating calls, an example of negative phonotaxis. The cricket will steer itself away from the source of the sound within a very short time frame (40–80 ms). The response is evoked by brief ultrasonic pulses in the 20 to 100 kHz range, pulses that fall within the range of bat ultrasonic echolocating calls (20–100 kHz).

As opposed to moths, the cricket ear, located in the foreleg, is complex - having 70 receptors that are arranged in a tonotopic fashion. This is understandable since crickets don't only need to listen to bats, but also to each other. Crickets have broad frequency sensitivity to different types of echolocating calls. One specific auditory interneuron, the AN2 interneuron, exhibits remarkably rapid responses to echolocating call stimuli.

All these receptors synapse on a far lower number of interneurons that relay the receptors' information to the cricket's central nervous system. In the Teleogryllus cricket, two ascending interneurons carry information to the brain - one carries information about cricket song (around 5 kHz) while the other gets excited at ultrasound and other high frequencies (15–100 kHz). The ultrasound-sensitive interneuron - labeled INT-1 - has been demonstrated as both necessary and sufficient for negative phonotaxis by Nolen and Hoy in 1984:

Stimulating int-1 by current injection is sufficient to initiate negative phonotaxis, while hyperpolarizing int-1 effectively cancels the turning response to ultrasound. Due to this, int-1 has been proposed to be a command neuron of sorts; in the cricket, int-1 is a bat detector when the cricket is in flight and the interneuron's activity reaches a specific threshold. If these conditions are met, the magnitude of the sound is linearly proportional to the magnitude of the avoidance response. This research also demonstrated that the brain is necessary for the response, since decapitated crickets will fly but show no avoidance response behaviors.

Bats may have found ways to get around this system. In the Teleogryllus oceanicus cricket, its broad sensitivity can be circumvented by the use of frequency-mismatched calls by part of bats like the gleaning bat, Nyctophilus geoffroyi. Furthermore, it has been found that the ultrasound avoidance response is restricted to when the crickets are in flight; that is, the response is extinguished when the crickets are on the ground.

It has also been shown that short-winged crickets are less sensitive to ultrasound, but not to low frequencies, than their long-winged counterparts in a wing-dimorphic cricket, Grillus texensis. A hormone, named juvenile hormone (JH), is believed to play a role in whether the individual develops shorter or longer wings: if the individual has a higher level of JH, its wings will be shorter.

== Ultrasound avoidance in other insects ==
In praying mantises, ultrasound avoidance behaviors are non-directional turns or power dives that are very effective in preventing capture by bats. The mantis ear, located in the midline between the metathoracic (third) legs, comprises two tympana within an auditory chamber that enhances sensitivity. A bilaterally symmetrical pair of auditory interneurons, 501-T3, accurately track the ultrasonic calls during the early stages of a bat attack. Because 501-T3 stops firing just before the evasive response starts, it may be involved in triggering the behavior. The praying mantis ear first appeared c. 120 million years ago, predating the appearance of echolocating bats by c. 50 million years, so its original function must be different from its current one.

Arctiid moths use a very different but highly effective defense against bats. They produce loud ultrasonic clicks in response to ultrasound. Depending on the species of moth and its ecology, the clicks may work by startling the bat, by jamming its echolocation system, or by warning of distastefulness (aposematism).

Green lacewings (Chrysopidae) have sensitive ears on their wings. Ultrasound causes flying lacewings to fold their wings and drop, an effective maneuver for evading capture by bats. Some tettigoniids use a similar strategy, although other species respond much like crickets.

Several other insects have sensitive ultrasonic hearing that probably is used in bat evasion, but direct evidence is not yet available. These include scarab beetles, tiger beetles and a parasitoid fly (Ormia sp.)
