= Ormia brevicornis =

Scientific classification
- Kingdom: Animalia
- Phylum: Arthropoda
- Class: Insecta
- Order: Diptera
- Family: Tachinidae
- Subfamily: Tachininae
- Tribe: Ormiini
- Genus: Ormia
- Species: O. brevicornis

Binomial name
- Ormia brevicornis Townsend, 1919

Species of fly

Ormia brevicornis is a species of bristle fly in the family Tachinidae. It is a parasitoid of the genus Neoconocephalus.

== Subspecies ==
These two subspecies belong to the species Ormia brevicornis:

- Ormia brevicornis brevicornis Townsend, 1919
- Ormia brevicornis nuttingi (Sabrosky, 1953)

== Distribution ==
United States.
