= Ormia dominicana =

Scientific classification
- Kingdom: Animalia
- Phylum: Arthropoda
- Class: Insecta
- Order: Diptera
- Family: Tachinidae
- Subfamily: Tachininae
- Tribe: Ormiini
- Genus: Ormia
- Species: O. dominicana

Binomial name
- Ormia dominicana Townsend, 1919

Species of fly

Ormia dominicana is a species of bristle fly in the family Tachinidae.

== Distribution ==
Cuba, Dominican Republic, Puerto Rico, Guatemala, Panama, Argentina.
