= Ormia lineifrons =

Scientific classification
- Kingdom: Animalia
- Phylum: Arthropoda
- Class: Insecta
- Order: Diptera
- Family: Tachinidae
- Subfamily: Tachininae
- Tribe: Ormiini
- Genus: Ormia
- Species: O. lineifrons

Binomial name
- Ormia lineifrons Sabrosky, 1953

Species of fly

Ormia lineifrons is a species of bristle fly in the family Tachinidae.

== Distribution ==
United States, Bermuda, Puerto Rico, Trinidad and Tobago, Honduras, Mexico, Nicaragua, Brazil.
