= Aulacephala =

Scientific classification
- Kingdom: Animalia
- Phylum: Arthropoda
- Class: Insecta
- Order: Diptera
- Family: Tachinidae
- Subfamily: Tachininae
- Tribe: Ormiini
- Genus: Aulacephala; Macquart, 1851

Synonyms
- Auacephala Cantrell & Crosskey, 1989; Aulacocephala Gerstaecker, 1863; Aulacocephalopsis Townsend, 1919

Genus of flies

Aulacephala is a genus of flies in the family Tachinidae.

== Species ==
- Aulacephala brevifacies (Villeneuve, 1914)
- Aulacephala hervei Bequaert, 1922
- Aulacephala maculithorax Macquart, 1851
