= Homotrixa =

Scientific classification
- Kingdom: Animalia
- Phylum: Arthropoda
- Class: Insecta
- Order: Diptera
- Family: Tachinidae
- Subfamily: Tachininae
- Tribe: Ormiini
- Genus: Homotrixa; Villeneuve, 1914

Type species
- Homotrixa brevifacies Villeneuve, 1914

Genus of flies

Homotrixa is a genus of flies in the family Tachinidae.

== Species ==
- Homotrixa alleni Barraclough, 1996
- Homotrixa brevifacies Villeneuve, 1914
- Homotrixa hirsuta Barraclough, 1996
