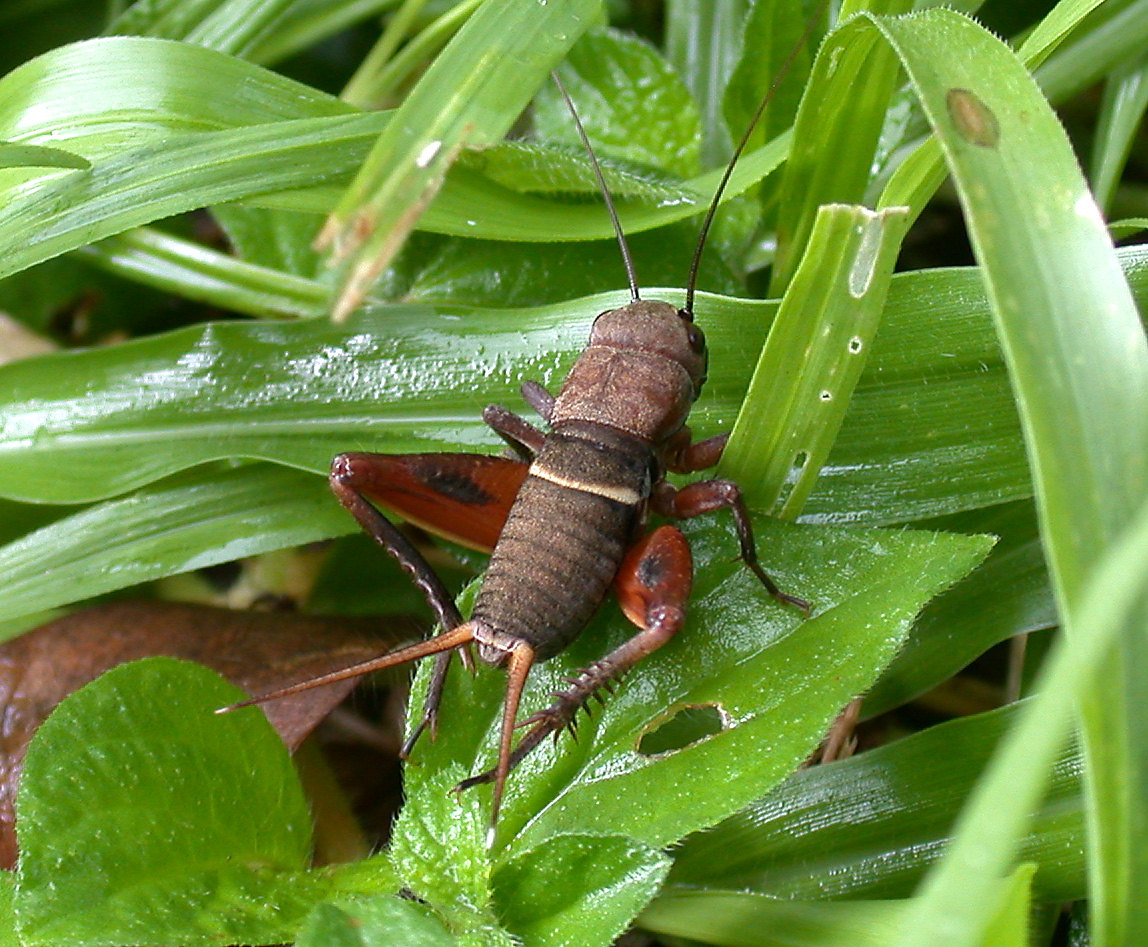
- Teleogryllus mitratus in Thailand

Scientific classification
- Kingdom: Animalia
- Phylum: Arthropoda
- Clade: Pancrustacea
- Class: Insecta
- Order: Orthoptera
- Suborder: Ensifera
- Family: Gryllidae
- Genus: Teleogryllus
- Species: T. mitratus

Binomial name
- Teleogryllus mitratus (Burmeister, 1838)

= Teleogryllus mitratus =

Species of cricket

Teleogryllus mitratus is a species of field cricket in the family Gryllidae. It belongs to the genus Teleogryllus, a group of crickets known for their loud calling songs and widespread distribution across Asia and Oceania.

== Description ==
Teleogryllus mitratus is a medium- to large-sized cricket with a robust body and long hind legs adapted for jumping. Like other members of the genus, it possesses leathery forewings and well-developed hind wings. Males produce calling songs by stridulation, rubbing specialized structures on their forewings together.

== Range ==
The species occurs in parts of South and Southeast Asia, including India.

== Habitat ==
It is typically found in grasslands, agricultural areas, open scrub, and other disturbed habitats where vegetation cover and moist soil are present.

== Ecology ==
Teleogryllus mitratus is primarily nocturnal. Males call during the night to attract females. The species feeds on plant material and small organic matter, similar to other field crickets.

== Etymology ==
The specific epithet mitratus was established by German entomologist Hermann Burmeister in 1838.

== Taxonomy ==
The species was originally described in 1838 by Hermann Burmeister. A taxonomic revision published in 2021 redescribed the species and provided updated diagnostic characters for Indian representatives of the genus.
