= Phasioormia =

Scientific classification
- Kingdom: Animalia
- Phylum: Arthropoda
- Class: Insecta
- Order: Diptera
- Family: Tachinidae
- Subfamily: Tachininae
- Tribe: Ormiini
- Genus: Phasioormia; Townsend, 1933

Type species
- Phasioormia pallida Townsend, 1933

Genus of flies

Phasioormia is a genus of flies in the family Tachinidae.

== Species ==
- Phasioormia bicornis (Malloch, 1932)
- Phasioormia pallida Townsend, 1933
- Phasioormia papuana Nihei, 2015
