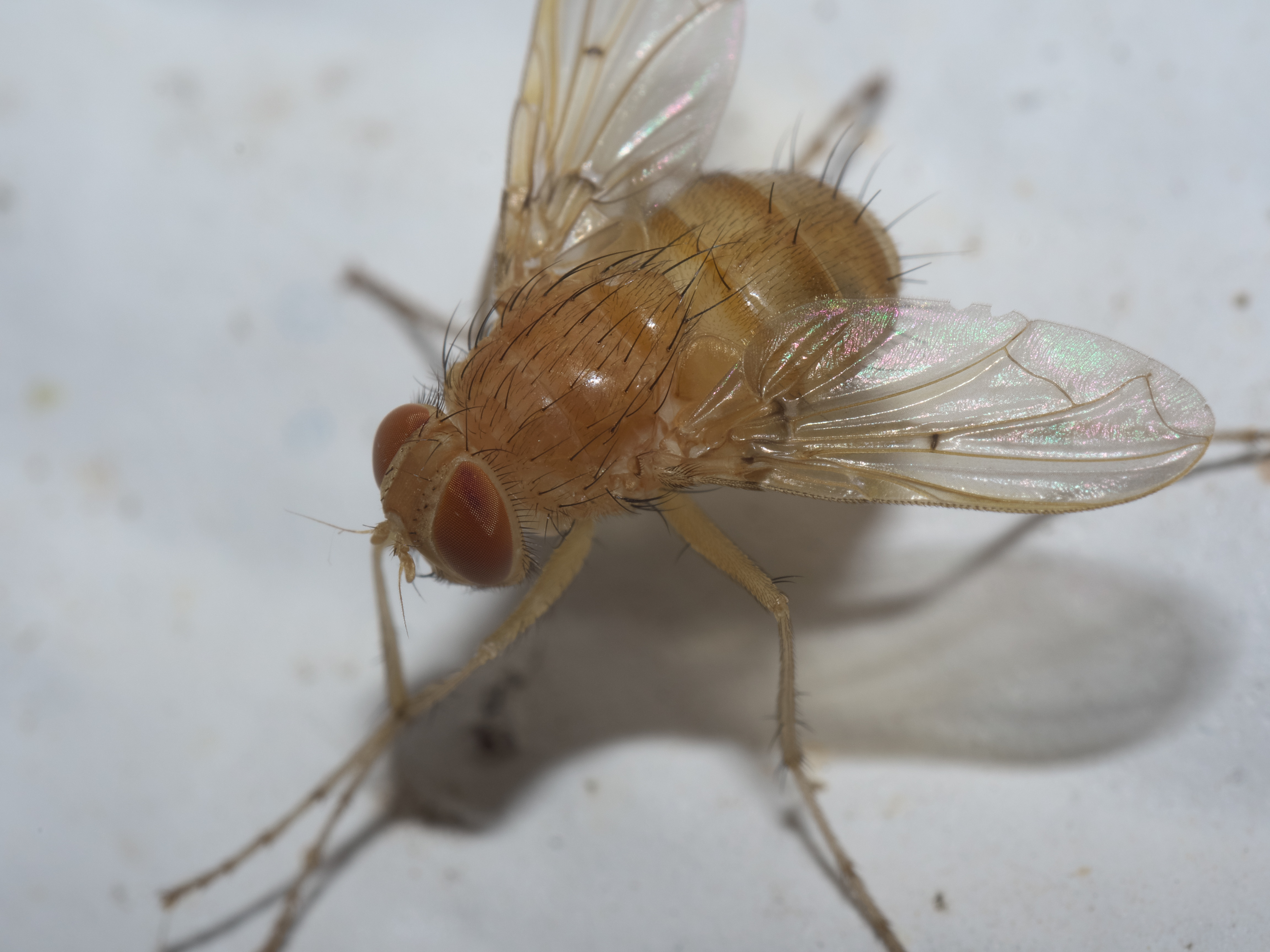

Scientific classification
- Kingdom: Animalia
- Phylum: Arthropoda
- Class: Insecta
- Order: Diptera
- Family: Tachinidae
- Subfamily: Tachininae
- Tribe: Ormiini
- Genus: Ormia
- Species: O. reinhardi

Binomial name
- Ormia reinhardi Sabrosky, 1953

Synonyms
- Euphasiopteryx reinhardi Sabrosky, 1953

= Ormia reinhardi =

Species of fly

Ormia reinhardi is a species of bristle fly in the family Tachinidae.

== Distribution ==
United States, Canada.
