= Therobia leonidei =

Scientific classification
- Domain: Eukaryota
- Kingdom: Animalia
- Phylum: Arthropoda
- Class: Insecta
- Order: Diptera
- Family: Tachinidae
- Genus: Therobia
- Species: T. leonidei

Binomial name
- Therobia leonidei Mesnil, 1965

Species of insect

Therobia leonidei is a species of fly in the family Tachinidae. It is a parasitoid of bushcrickets, including those from genera Poecilimon and Parapholidoptera.
