= Ormiophasia =

Scientific classification
- Kingdom: Animalia
- Phylum: Arthropoda
- Clade: Pancrustacea
- Class: Insecta
- Order: Diptera
- Family: Tachinidae
- Subfamily: Tachininae
- Tribe: Ormiini
- Genus: Ormiophasia; Townsend, 1919

Type species
- Ormiophasia busckii Townsend, 1919

Synonyms
- Plagiotormia Séguy, 1926; Pseudoneoptera Séguy, 1926; Pseudormia Séguy, 1926; Pseudormia Séguy, 1927

Genus of flies

Ormiophasia is a genus of flies in the family Tachinidae.

== Species ==
- Ormiophasia bioculus Gudin & Nihei, 2019
- Ormiophasia busckii Townsend, 1919
- Ormiophasia causeyi Tavares, 1964
- Ormiophasia chapulini Gudin & Nihei, 2019
- Ormiophasia costalimai Tavares, 1964
- Ormiophasia crassivena Gudin & Nihei, 2019
- Ormiophasia cruzi Tavares, 1964
- Ormiophasia guimaraesi Gudin & Nihei, 2019
- Ormiophasia inflata (Séguy, 1927)
- Ormiophasia lanei Tavares, 1964
- Ormiophasia manguinhos Gudin & Nihei, 2019
- Ormiophasia morardi (Séguy, 1926)
- Ormiophasia obscura (Séguy, 1926)
- Ormiophasia seguyi Gudin & Nihei, 2019
- Ormiophasia tavaresi Gudin & Nihei, 2019
- Ormiophasia tavassosi Tavares, 1964
- Ormiophasia townsendi Gudin & Nihei, 2019
