= Therobia =

Scientific classification
- Kingdom: Animalia
- Phylum: Arthropoda
- Class: Insecta
- Order: Diptera
- Family: Tachinidae
- Subfamily: Tachininae
- Tribe: Ormiini
- Genus: Therobia; Brauer, 1862

Type species
- Trypoderma abdominalis Wiedemann, 1830

Synonyms
- Ormiominda Paramonov, 1955; Plesiooestrus Villeneuve, 1914; Proxystomima Villeneuve, 1925; Therobiopsis Townsend, 1919; Xystomima Villeneuve, 1914; Xistomima Villeneuve, 1914

Genus of flies

Therobia is a genus of flies in the family Tachinidae.

== Species ==
- Therobia abdominalis (Wiedemann, 1830)
- Therobia albifacies (Villeneuve, 1914)
- Therobia bicolor (Séguy, 1933)
- Therobia braueri (Kertész, 1899)
- Therobia composita (Séguy, 1925)
- Therobia insularis (Séguy, 1947)
- Therobia japonica (Ueda, 1960)
- Therobia leonidei (Mesnil, 1965)
- Therobia maculipennis (Villeneuve, 1914)
- Therobia melampodis (Séguy, 1969)
- Therobia minuta (Séguy, 1926)
- Therobia mongolica (Richter, 1972)
- Therobia papuana (Paramonov, 1955)
- Therobia punctigera (Paramonov, 1955)
- Therobia rieki (Paramonov, 1955)
- Therobia secunda (Paramonov, 1955)
- Therobia tristis (Séguy, 1926)
- Therobia umbrinervis (Villeneuve, 1925)
- Therobia vesiculifera Bezzi, 1928
- Therobia vulpes (Séguy, 1948)
