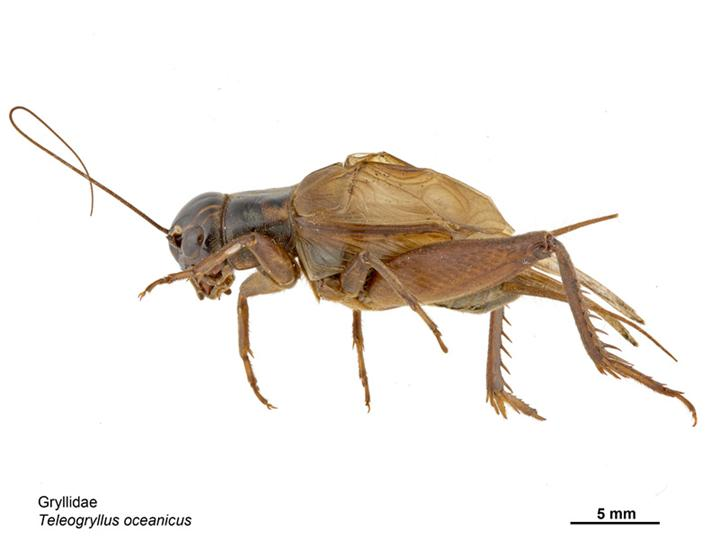

Scientific classification
- Kingdom: Animalia
- Phylum: Arthropoda
- Clade: Pancrustacea
- Class: Insecta
- Order: Orthoptera
- Suborder: Ensifera
- Family: Gryllidae
- Subfamily: Gryllinae
- Tribe: Gryllini
- Genus: Teleogryllus
- Species: T. oceanicus

Binomial name
- Teleogryllus oceanicus (Le Guillou, 1841)

Synonyms
- Acheta oceanica Gryllus oceanicus Gryllus innotabilis

= Teleogryllus oceanicus =

Species of cricket

Teleogryllus oceanicus, commonly known as the Australian, Pacific or oceanic field cricket, is a cricket found across Oceania and in coastal Australia from Carnarvon in Western Australia and Rockhampton in north-east Queensland

T. oceanicus populations in Hawaii arose through human-assisted introduction. It is currently unknown whether T. oceanicus was introduced to Hawaii in 1877 by area trade ships, or 1500 years ago with the original Polynesian settlers. Microsatellite comparisons support the idea that the Hawaiian T. oceanicus colonization originated in the Western islands and then spread East.

T. oceanicus crickets are black to dark brown in coloration with longitudinal stripes on the back of the head. Males average between 28 and 35 mm in length, and the females are typically longer due to the ovipositor with an average of 33–42 mm. These crickets are typically found on soil ground hiding in fissures or holes in the terrain, and are typically only found in high numbers in landscapes that provide a good deal of cover.

T. oceanicus may also be referred to as the black field cricket, a common name it shares with Teleogryllus commodus. The two species are nearly morphologically indistinguishable, the exception being that T. oceanicus males have a greater number of file teeth on their wings. T. oceanicus was originally regarded taxonomically as a geographic race of T. commodus, but was later recognized as a distinct species as growing evidence of reproductive isolation and differences in calling sound were reported. The two species' geographic ranges remain mostly separate with the exception of small overlap zones in Eastern Australia. There have been no reports of hybridization between the species in this overlap zone, thought to be due to differences in calling song acting as a pre-zygotic barrier. No character displacement has been observed in either species in this overlap region. Unlike T. commodus which lays eggs only a single time per season, T. oceanicus crickets breed year round.

== Song production ==
Like most cricket species, Teleogryllus oceanicus males produce a calling song to attract potential female mates. Crickets produce the sound of their calls using a "file-scraper" system where, as the male opens and closes its wings, a plectrum (scraper) located on the posterior side of the left wing is rubbed against a filed vein located on the right wing. Structures called the harp and mirror allow the vibrations to resonate, producing the sound that we hear.

== Courtship ==
Upon being approached by another individual, the male cricket will make antennal contact with the visitor. This contact allows a form of communication through chemoreception, and is important in determining the sex of the other individual. If the visitor is identified as a female, the male will begin the courtship behavior. During courtship, the male will begin singing the courtship song, which is much softer than the calling song, and is made of 7-10 amplitude-modulated chirps followed by a long and fast trill. As courtship progresses, the male will continue to stridulate and stroke the body of the female with his antennae. The female may respond by turning towards the male and contacting his abdomen with her forelegs, antennae and palpi. The male will then flatten his abdomen and spread his forewings, allowing the female to mount him, ultimately leading to copulation. During copulation, the male transfers his sperm to the female via spermatophore. After spermatophore transfer is complete, the male will attempt to remain in contact with the female to prevent her from removing the spermatophore. Unguarded female crickets have been shown to attempt to remove the spermatophore shortly after copulation. In crickets, male guarding behavior duration is closely related to the time it takes to complete sperm transfer.

== Female preferences ==
In crickets, it is the female sex that is choosy when responding to sexual signals. Sexual signals in Telogryllus oceanicus consists of multiple components. These components may be acoustic in nature, such as the calling song and the courtship song. Chemical components are also present in the form of cuticular hydrocarbons.

=== Calling song ===
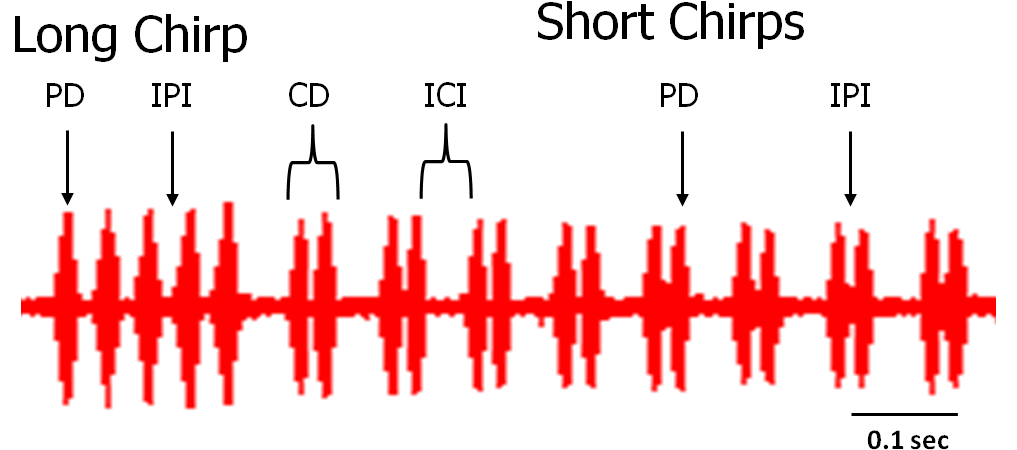
Sonogram of the Teleogryllus oceanicus male calling song

In Teleogryllus oceanicus, the calling song is complex, consisting of a chirp made up of 4 similar pulses, followed by a trill of pairs of pulses. Properties of this calling song have been shown to vary with temperature. Because the calling song is species specific, and acts as a prezygotic mating barrier in Teleogryllus crickets, it is thought that the calling song is important for females to recognize same-species males. The male calling song also varies between populations. These differences are observed in total song length, pulse duration, and time between pulses. Females in all populations show a consistent preference for a higher proportion of the long chirp element. Because the long chirp element is more energetically demanding, this preference may serve as an honest indicator to the female in regards to the male's fitness.

=== Courtship song ===
The courtship song in crickets is hypothesized to evolutionarily predate the calling song. The male begins the courtship song after a female reacts passively to antennal contact. The presence of the courtship song during male courtship behavior is important in eliciting the female mounting response. Courtship song has been shown to be more variable in Teleogryllus oceanicus than the calling song, and is also more energetically expensive to produce. While calling song is thought to be involved in species recognition, the courtship song is thought to convey fitness information of the singing male. Females show a preference for courtship songs that have a high sound content per unit time. Because the courtship song is energetically expensive to produce, it may serve as an honest indicator of the male's health or fitness. Males that were subjected to an immune challenge were less likely to produce the courtship song, and females showed a preference for the courtship song of males that showed a stronger immune response.

=== Cuticular hydrocarbons (CHCs) ===
In addition to acoustic signals, crickets use chemical signals encoded in cuticular hydrocarbons (CHC). CHCs are waxy chemical compounds that are found on the exoskeleton of most terrestrial arthropods that protect against desiccation, and these compounds have been found to be sexually dimorphic in Teleogryllus oceanicus. It is thought that crickets use the information found in the CHC chemical signal to determine genetic similarity. In other words, crickets can sense how closely related an adjacent individual is by processing the odor exhibited by the CHCs. Females have been shown to exhibit a preference for CHC profiles that show a higher degree of dissimilarity, suggesting that it could serve as a defense against inbreeding. Using CHC profiles in inbreeding defense can occur pre-copulation, in that individuals are less likely to mate when their CHC profile is more similar. This defense can also be exhibited post-copulation, in the form of fertilization bias. After a spermatophore has been transferred to the female's reproductive tract, it takes roughly 40 minutes for the sperm to enter the spermathecal duct, during which time the male remains in contact with the female in a guarding behavior. During this period, females are able to use CHC cues to determine degree of relatedness. Females have control of sperm storage to a degree, and have been shown to store more sperm from non-related males compared to related males.

== Male-male competition ==
If a calling male cricket encounters another cricket, he will make antennal contact with the stranger individual to recognize the sex of the visitor. If the visitor is found to be another male, the calling male will begin aggressive behaviors. A male begins by singing an aggression song to the rival male, which results in the rival reciprocating, or retreating. Male conflicts involve antennal contact, lunging, aggressive chirping, and biting. Outcomes of fights depend on multiple factors, including differences in size, territory residency, differences in behavior, and fighting experience. Dominant males who have previously won fights are much more likely to win future fights. Males who have won 5 consecutive fights have been shown to have an 87% probability of winning the next. A male cricket's aggression song changes as a result of fight outcome (being enhanced after a win or reduced after a loss) thereby reinforcing a male's dominance or submission. Because conflicts can be very costly, winning fights may serve as an honest indicator of a male individual's fitness which can be assessed by females. A male's dominance also has a post-copulation effect by influencing fertilization success. Dominant males produce higher quality ejaculate, leading to females laying more eggs when mated to a dominant male compared to a subordinate male. Rather than focus on ejaculate quality, subordinate males up-regulate the production of their cuticular hydrocarbons to appear more attractive to females.

Males also assess the presence of male competition through auditory cues. Males in an area that has a high number singing males will increase sperm production to combat the perceived sperm competition.

Females have displayed aggressive behaviors both in the male presence and absence, but not as frequent as male competition. Ongoing research is examining what happens in these social interactions, but they seem to be more frequent in the presence of male songs.

== Predators ==
Like other small insects, Teleogryllus oceanicus crickets are subject to predation from many sources. This includes other insects, rodents, lizards, and mammals. Sexual signals used to attract a mate are often conspicuous and can by exploited by "eavesdropping" predators or parasites. Secondary traits that evolved via sexual selection may therefore be simultaneously opposed by natural selection. These species are then presented a conflict between mate attraction and survival. Male crickets are especially vulnerable to attack due to their conspicuous calling song. While this behavior is vital for mate attraction, it also gives up the calling individual's locations to nearby predators, especially those which hunt using acoustic cues. The most common acoustically oriented predators to pose a threat are insectivorous bats. For some T. oceanicus populations in Hawaii, the parasitoid fly species Ormia ochracea also poses a great threat.

=== Bat predation ===
Bats are very well equipped to prey upon crickets. While some bats rely purely on mid-flight echolocation to locate their prey, other species locate their prey through passive listening, orienting towards sounds made by the prey, and often emitting a fainter echolocation call as they approach their target. Teleogryllus oceanicus crickets have been shown to be able to distinguish a range of echolocation frequencies, responding with avoidance flight away from the bats. Multiple species of bats (Nyctophilus major and N. geoffroyi) have been shown to prefer trills in the cricket song compared to chirps. As a result, male crickets prefer to call from shelter, and the calls from males in shelter contain a greater number of trills than those emitted by a non-sheltered male.

=== Ormia ochracea parasitism ===
Ormia ochracea is an acoustically-orienting parasitoid fly that is native to North America, but has also been introduced to Hawaii. Females of this species are able to locate singing male Teleogryllus oceanicus crickets using a hearing apparatus evolutionarily convergent to T. oceanicus females. Once the singing male has been located, the female fly lays eggs on and around the male cricket, allowing her larvae to burrow into the host. The larvae eat and grow inside the cricket, emerging roughly 7 days later to pupate, killing the male cricket in the process.

T. oceanicus and O. ochracea geographic distributions only overlap in Hawaii. On Hawaii, some T. oceanicus populations live in the presence of the parasitoid fly while others do not. Populations subject to fly parasitism show differences in calling behavior when compared to populations where the fly is absent. Parasitized populations refrain from singing at dawn or dusk, when the flies are active. Additionally, differences in the calling song itself have been attributed to pressures from the fly's presence. Populations with greater fly density show more differences in their calling song than populations with a lower fly density, which resemble non-parasitized population songs more closely.

T. oceanicus males that have been parasitized by O. ochracea show a decrease in reproductive investment. Infected male individuals spend less energy on spermatophore production and calling and allocate less mass to reproductive tissue. This decrease is contrary to the reproductive compensation hypothesis, which predicts that parasitized individuals will increase reproductive efforts to counteract the decrease in life expectancy. Whether the decrease in reproductive effort is a result of energy trade-offs or chemical changes made by the fly to affect the host remains to be seen.

== Flatwing wing morphs ==
In 2003, a novel mutation was identified in the highly parasitized Teleogryllus oceanicus population in Kauai that resulted in a wing morphology that renders the male obligately silent (known as flatwing). This mutation is inherited through a single sex-linked allele. With such a heavy parasite presence, males with the mutation could have a survival advantage, which led to rapid evolution, with over 90% of males exhibiting the flatwing morphology after less than 20 generations. While these males were at an advantage when it came to survival, they were also at a disadvantage when it came to reproduction because they were unable to sing to attract a mate. To overcome this barrier and pass on the mutation to future generations, a behavioral change in regards to reproduction would have had to take place to compensate. This behavior is known as satellite behavior.

Satellite male strategy has been shown in a wide range of species including fish, frogs and other cricket species. Satellite males adopt an alternative reproduction strategy in which they are attracted to dominant or, in the case of T. oceanicus, calling males in the hopes of intercepting a female. All male T. oceanicus males are attracted to the song of other males, but wild type males usually distance themselves from the caller by at least 1 meter. Flatwing males in the field move towards a calling song source at a faster rate and settle closer when compared to wild type males.

Once a flatwing male successfully intercepts a female, he is not able to produce the courtship song to evoke the female to mount. In order for flatwing males to persist in a population, changes in female preferences must have occurred. Because founding island populations may be quite small, it could be less advantageous for females to be choosy. While females from ancestral, non-parasitized Australian females will still mate with silent flatwing males, females from parasitized Hawaiian island populations discriminate significantly less against silent courting males.

Recent work has demonstrated the surprising extent of parallel adaptation occurring in this system. Although they are superficially similar, silent flatwing morphs observed in populations on three different Hawaiian islands have been shown to be the result of separate mutational events which occurred in the same or nearby genomic regions. Additionally, adaptive silence has evolved through morphologically distinct changes in wing morphology, including changes to 3D forewing morphology (the 'curlywing' phenotype) and size ('small-wing'), which similarly protect males from parasitism by O. ochracea. Adaptive silence has thus evolved independently on at least five occasions.

== Additional novel morphs ==
Since the discovery of flatwing, several new morphs have arisen across Hawaii, each with different changes to their wing structures that produce various attenuated songs. In 2017, males were identified in another population of T. oceanicus on the island of Molokai that produce a different song when stridulating, which superficially sounds like a cat's purr. Unlike the silent, flatwing morph, these "purring" males can use this new calling song to attract females. Purring males, which superficially resemble flatwing, have since been found on additional islands, and are now the most common morph in some locations. Other new morphs have also been discovered across Hawaii, including the "rattling" and "small-wing" morphs that produce their own novel attentuated songs using different modified wing structures. For example, rattling males generate their songs by having gaps between teeth on the file, a modified wing vein used during sound generation. These new signals attract mates while reducing detection by the parasitoid fly, with each morph balancing the conflicting selection pressures of ecological and sexual selection differently.
