= Mediosetiger =

Scientific classification
- Kingdom: Animalia
- Phylum: Arthropoda
- Class: Insecta
- Order: Diptera
- Family: Tachinidae
- Subfamily: Tachininae
- Tribe: Ormiini
- Genus: Mediosetiger; Barraclough, 1983

Type species
- Mediosetiger microcephala Barraclough, 1983

Genus of flies

Mediosetiger is a genus of flies in the family Tachinidae.

== Species ==
- Mediosetiger microcephala Barraclough, 1983

== Distribution ==
South Africa
