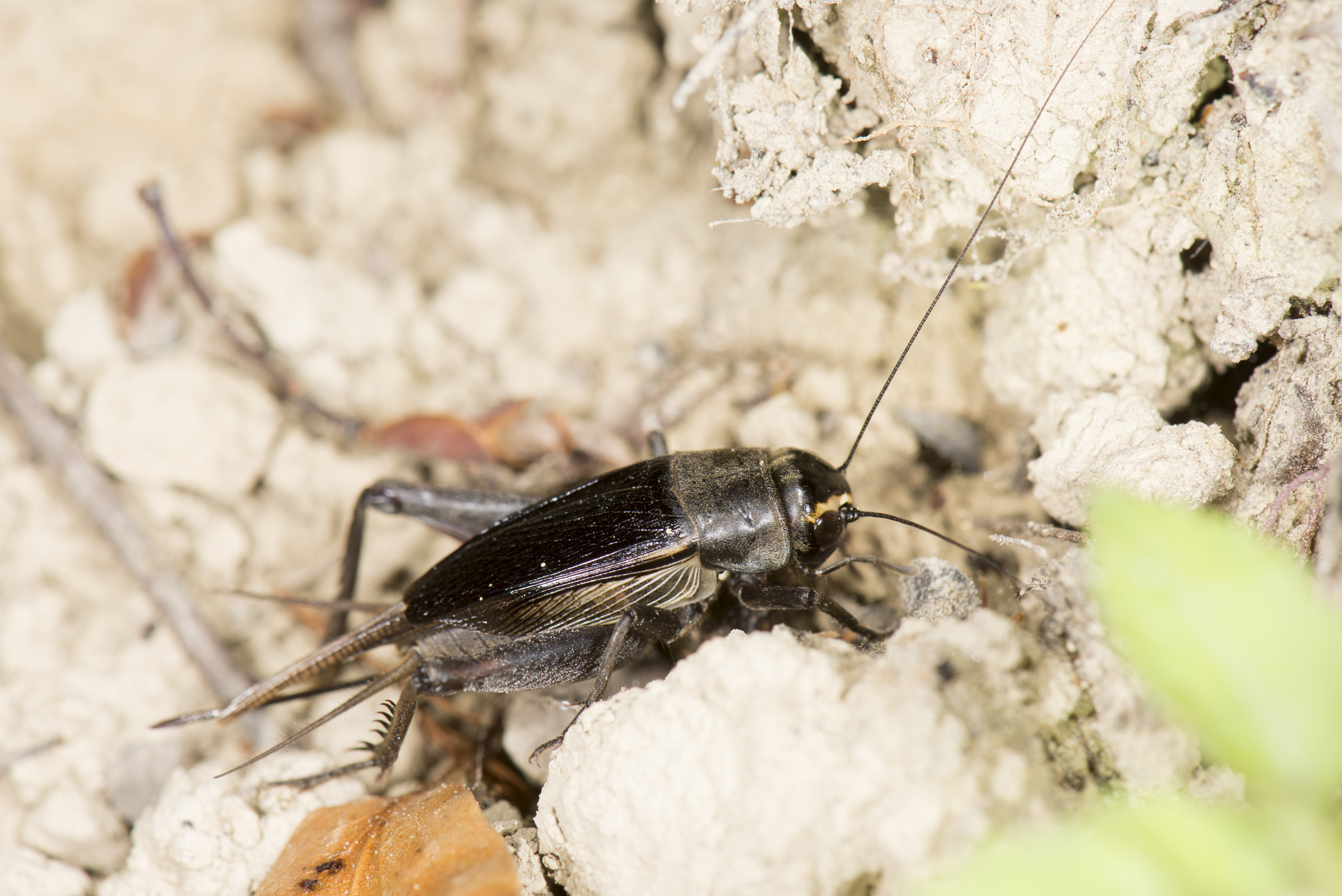
- Teleogryllus sp. female
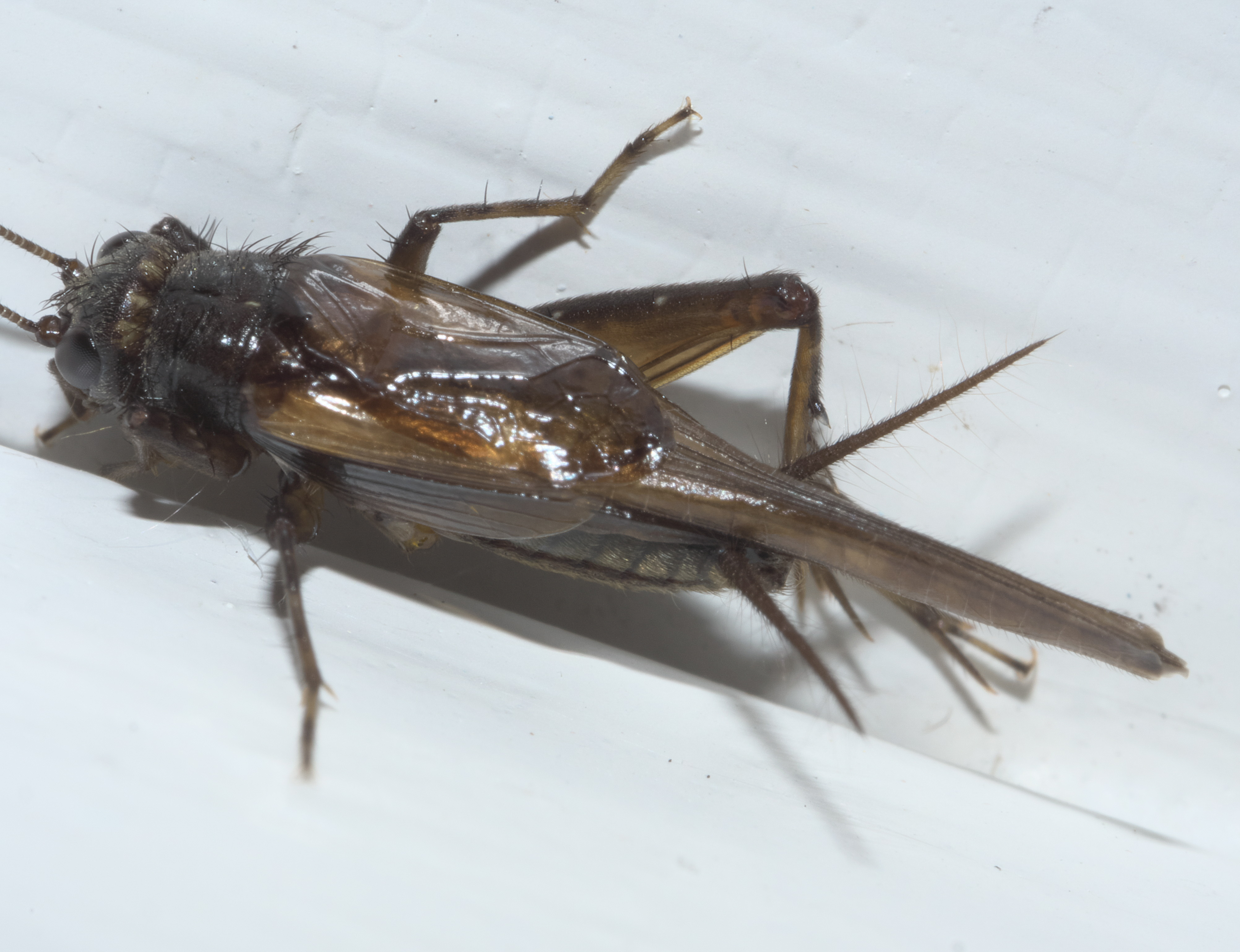
- Teleogryllus commodus male

Scientific classification
- Kingdom: Animalia
- Phylum: Arthropoda
- Clade: Pancrustacea
- Class: Insecta
- Order: Orthoptera
- Suborder: Ensifera
- Family: Gryllidae
- Subfamily: Gryllinae
- Tribe: Gryllini
- Genus: Teleogryllus; Chopard, 1961

Species
- See text

= Teleogryllus =

Genus of crickets

Teleogryllus is a genus of crickets in the family Gryllidae. Species can be found in Africa, Asia, Australia and the Pacific islands.

== Species ==
The following are listed in Orthoptera Species File Online:

subgenus Afroteleogryllus Gorochov, 1988

1. Teleogryllus clarus Gorochov, 1988
2. Teleogryllus latifrons (Karsch, 1893)
3. Teleogryllus lemur Gorochov, 1990
4. Teleogryllus leucostomus (Serville, 1838)
5. Teleogryllus trivialis Gorochov, 1990

subgenus Brachyteleogryllus Gorochov, 1988

1. Teleogryllus boninensis Matsuura, 1984
2. Teleogryllus commodus (Walker, 1869)
3. Teleogryllus emma (Ohmachi & Matsuura, 1951)
4. Teleogryllus infernalis (Saussure, 1877)
  [synonym T. yezoemma (Ohmachi & Matsuura, 1951)]
5. Teleogryllus marini Otte & Alexander, 1983
6. Teleogryllus occipitalis (Serville, 1838)
7. Teleogryllus rohinae Jaiswara & Jain, 2021

subgenus Cryncoides Gorochov, 1988

1. Teleogryllus longelytrum (Gorochov, 1988)

subgenus Macroteleogryllus Gorochov, 1985

1. Teleogryllus derelictus Gorochov, 1985
2. Teleogryllus mitratus (Burmeister, 1838)
  [synonyms include T. testaceus (Walker, 1869)]

subgenus Teleogryllus Chopard, 1961

1. Teleogryllus adustus (Karsch, 1893)
2. Teleogryllus afer (Saussure, 1877)
3. Teleogryllus africanus Otte & Cade, 1983
4. Teleogryllus albipalpus He, 2018
5. Teleogryllus angolensis (Chopard, 1962)
6. Teleogryllus bicoloripes Chopard, 1961
7. Teleogryllus brachypterus Chopard, 1967
8. Teleogryllus burri (Chopard, 1962)
9. Teleogryllus fallaciosus (Shiraki, 1930)
10. Teleogryllus flavovittatus (Chopard, 1928)
11. Teleogryllus fletcheri (Chopard, 1935)
12. Teleogryllus gnu Otte & Cade, 1983
13. Teleogryllus gracilipes (Saussure, 1877)
14. Teleogryllus gravelyi (Chopard, 1928)
15. Teleogryllus griaulei Chopard, 1961
16. Teleogryllus grumeti Otte & Cade, 1983
17. Teleogryllus himalayanus (Chopard, 1928)
18. Teleogryllus leo Otte & Cade, 1983
19. Teleogryllus leucostomoides (Chopard, 1962)
20. Teleogryllus longipennis (Saussure, 1877)
21. Teleogryllus macrurus (Walker, 1869)
22. Teleogryllus marabu Otte & Cade, 1983
23. Teleogryllus marini Otte & Alexander, 1983
24. Teleogryllus meru Otte & Cade, 1983
25. Teleogryllus mosetse Otte, Toms & Cade, 1988
26. Teleogryllus natalensis Otte & Cade, 1983
27. Teleogryllus nigripennis (Chopard, 1948)
28. Teleogryllus oceanicus (Le Guillou, 1841)
29. Teleogryllus posticus (Walker, 1869) - type species (as Gryllus posticus Walker)
30. Teleogryllus pulchriceps (Gerstaecker, 1869)
31. Teleogryllus rajasthanicus Meena & Swaminathan, 2022
32. Teleogryllus siamensis Inagaki & Matsuura, 1985
33. Teleogryllus soror (Chopard, 1940)
34. Teleogryllus triangulifer Chopard, 1961
35. Teleogryllus validus (Chopard, 1969)
36. Teleogryllus wernerianus (Karny, 1907)
37. Teleogryllus wittei (Chopard, 1939)
38. Teleogryllus xanthoneuroides (Chopard, 1932)
39. Teleogryllus xanthoneurus (Gerstaecker, 1869)
40. Teleogryllus zululandicus Otte & Cade, 1983

== Gallery ==
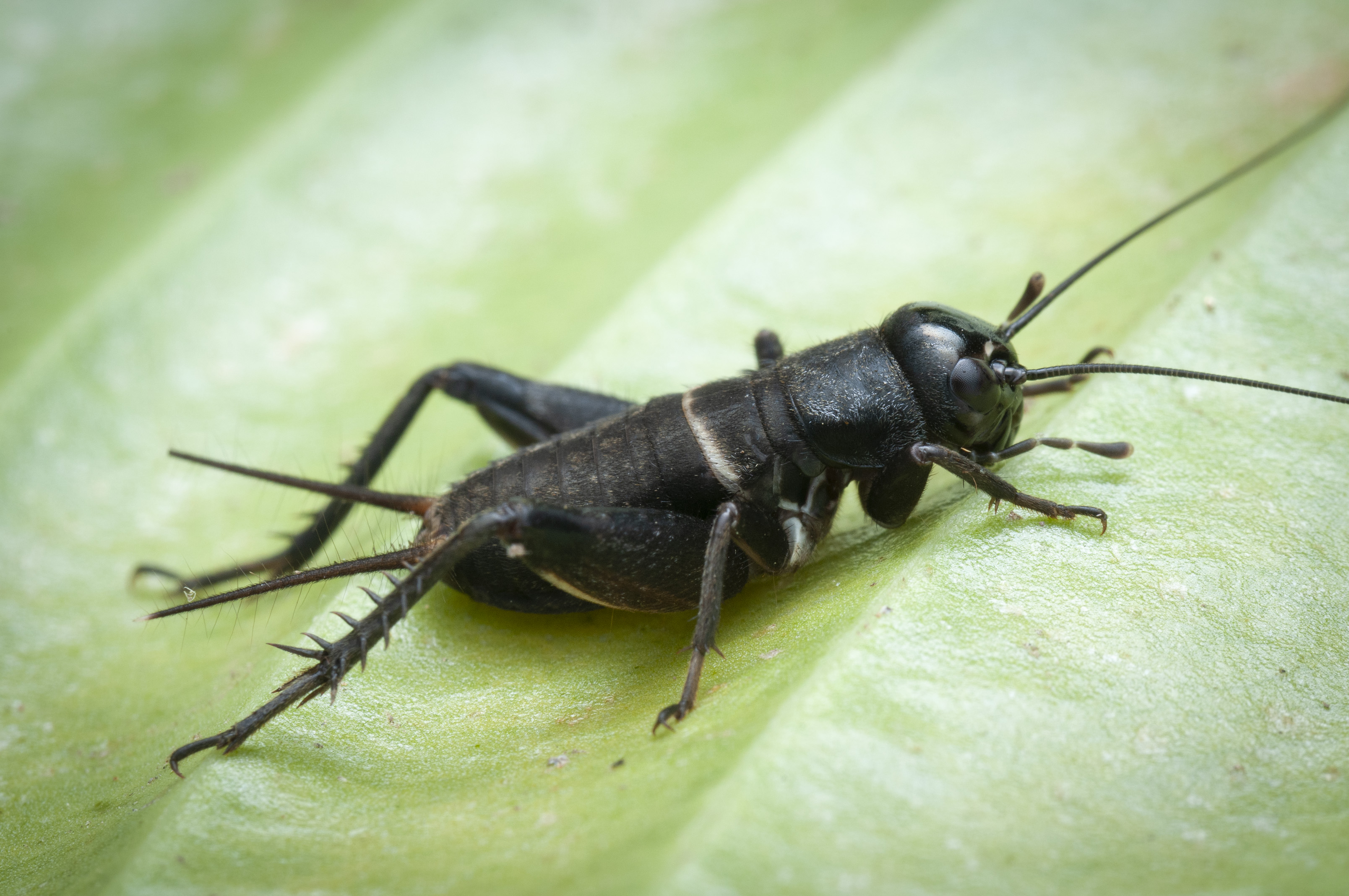
Teleogryllus emma, Caterpillar, South Korea

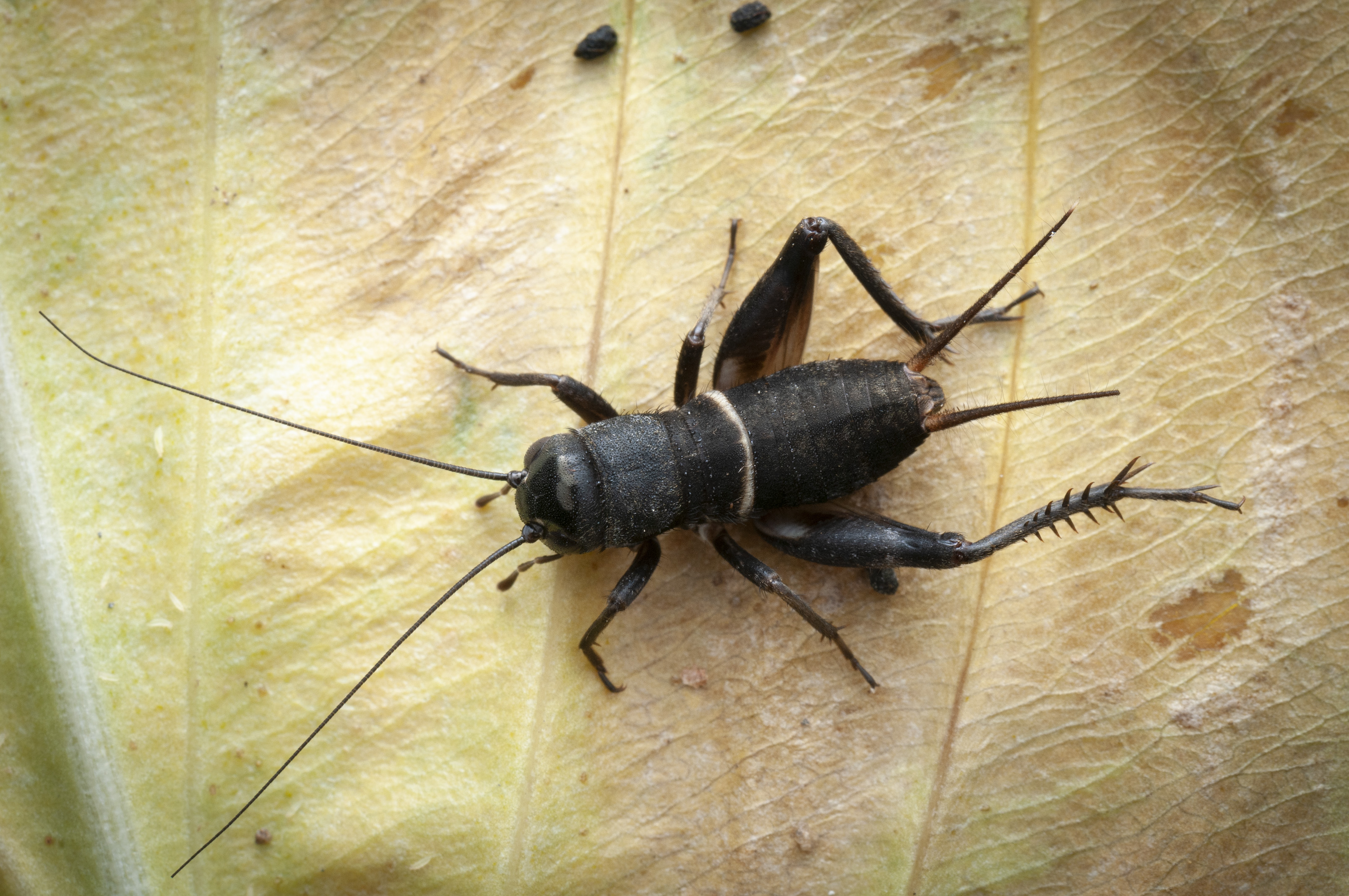
Teleogryllus emma, A first-instar caterpillar, South Korea
