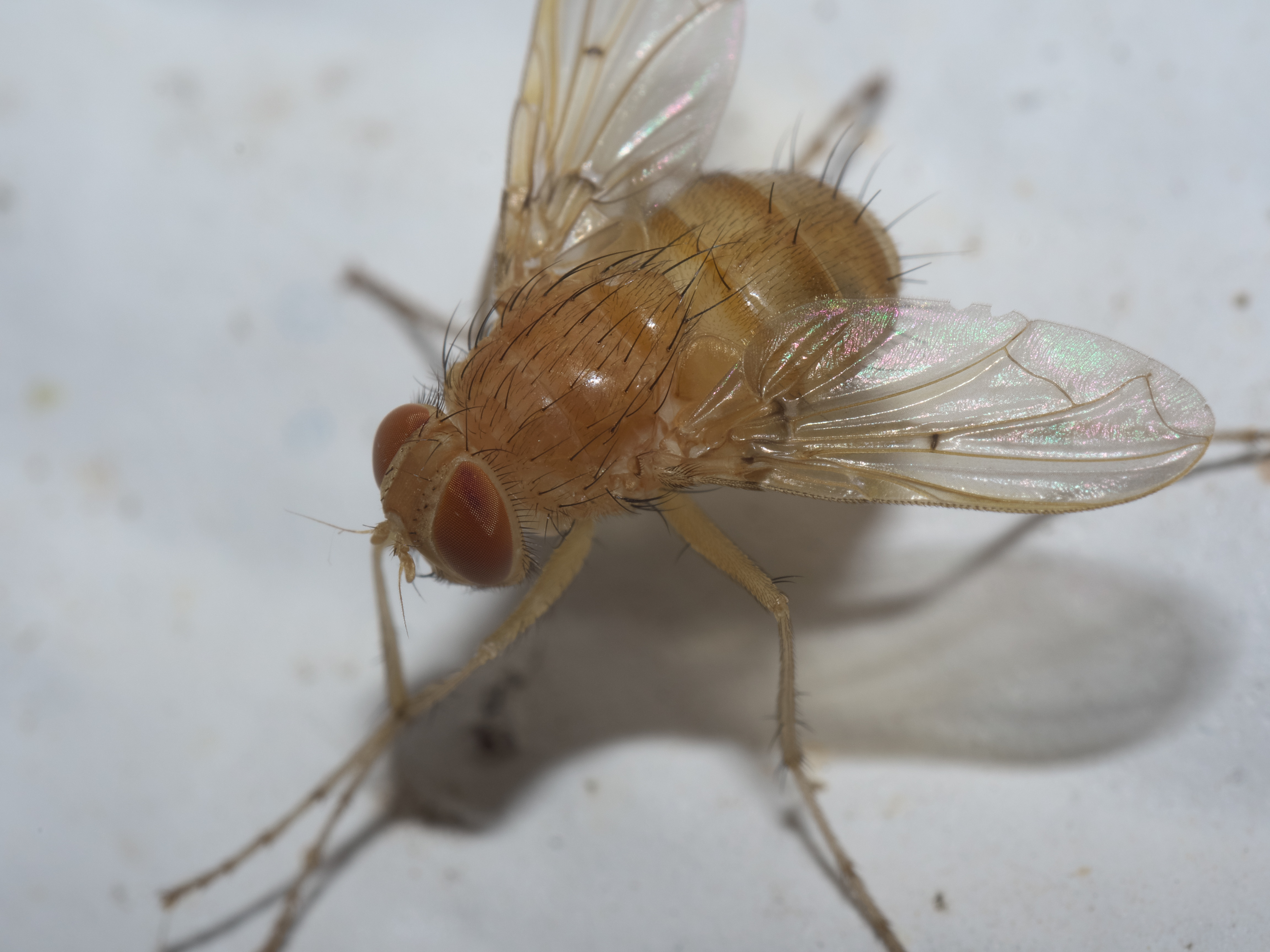
- Ormia reinhardi

Scientific classification
- Kingdom: Animalia
- Phylum: Arthropoda
- Class: Insecta
- Order: Diptera
- Family: Tachinidae
- Subfamily: Tachininae
- Tribe: Ormiini
- Genus: Ormia; Robineau-Desvoidy, 1830

Type species
- Ormia punctata Robineau-Desvoidy, 1830

Synonyms
- Euphasiopteryx Townsend, 1915; Hormia Agassiz, 1846; Neoptera Wulp, 1890; Phasiopteryx Brauer & von Berganstamm, 1889

= Ormia =

Genus of flies

Ormia is a small genus of nocturnal flies in the family Tachinidae, that are parasitoids of katydids and crickets.

Flies in this genus have become model organisms in sound localization experiments because of their "ears", which are complex structures inside the fly's prothorax near the bases of the front legs. The most common and widespread species, Ormia ochracea, has been the center of this research.

== Species ==
- Ormia aldrichi Séguy, 1925
- Ormia australis (Townsend, 1911)
- Ormia bilimekii (Brauer & von Berganstamm, 1889)
- Ormia brevicornis Townsend, 1919
- Ormia carreirai Tavares, 1965
- Ormia crespoi Tavares, 1965
- Ormia depleta (Wiedemann, 1830)
- Ormia dominicana Townsend, 1919
- Ormia guianica Curran, 1934
- Ormia lenkoi Tavares, 1965
- Ormia lenti Tavares, 1965
- Ormia lineifrons Sabrosky, 1953
- Ormia lopesi Tavares, 1962
- Ormia mendesi Tavares, 1965
- Ormia nocturna Curran, 1934
- Ormia nuttingi (Sabrosky, 1953)
- Ormia ochracea (Bigot, 1889)
- Ormia pellucida Séguy, 1925
- Ormia punctata Robineau-Desvoidy, 1830
- Ormia rachoui Tavares, 1962
- Ormia reinhardi (Sabrosky, 1953)
- Ormia rosenoi (Tavares, 1965)
- Ormia rufa (Wulp, 1890)
- Ormia serrei Séguy, 1925
- Ormia tarsalis Séguy, 1925
- Ormia wolcotti Sabrosky, 1953
- Ormia wygodzinskyi Tavares, 1965
