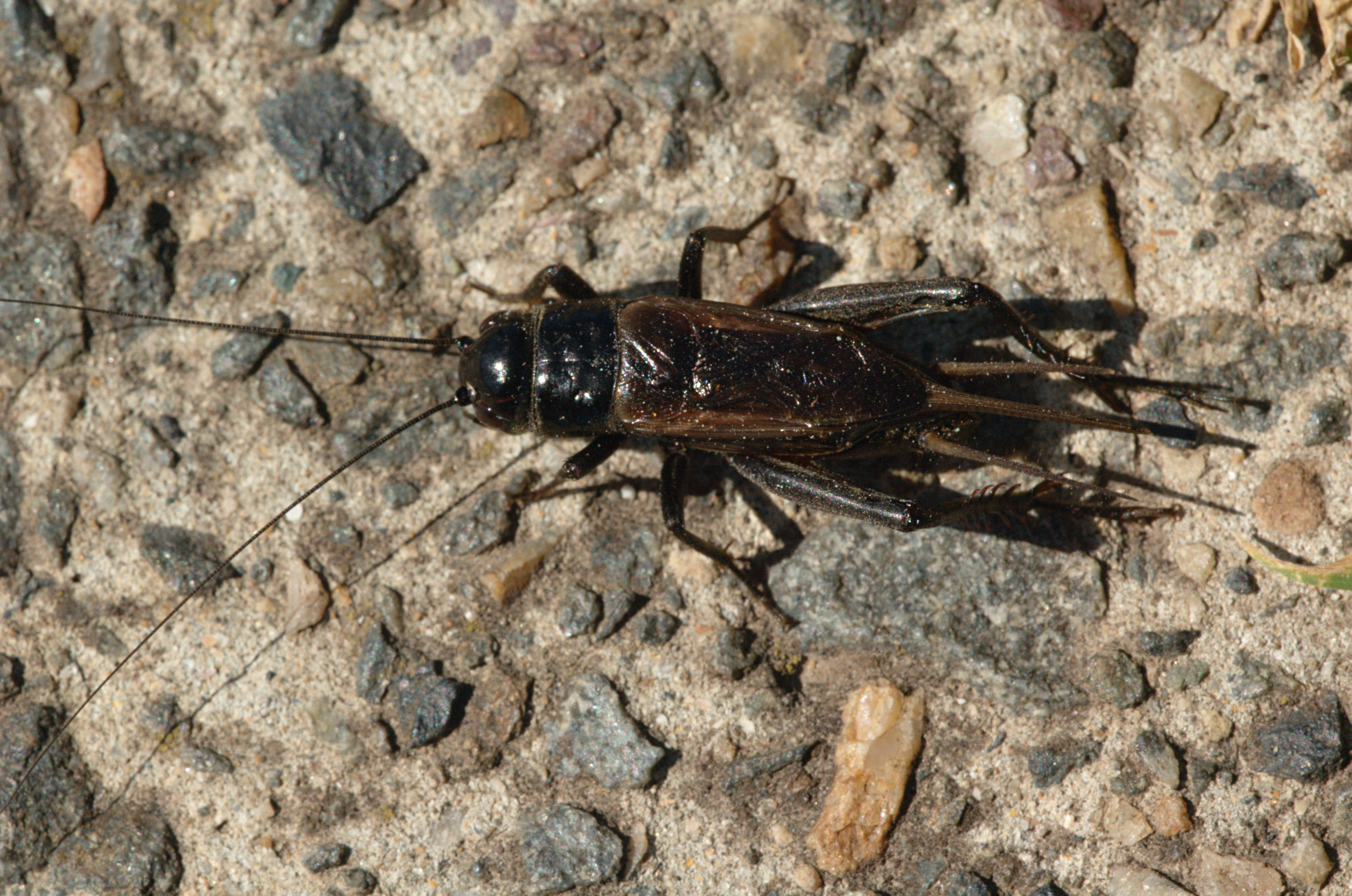

Scientific classification
- Kingdom: Animalia
- Phylum: Arthropoda
- Clade: Pancrustacea
- Class: Insecta
- Order: Orthoptera
- Suborder: Ensifera
- Family: Gryllidae
- Subfamily: Gryllinae
- Tribe: Gryllini
- Genus: Teleogryllus
- Species: T. commodus

Binomial name
- Teleogryllus commodus (Walker, 1869)

Synonyms
- Gryllus commodus Walker; Gryllus carbonarius Audinet-Serville 1839; Gryllus fuliginosus Audinet-Serville 1839; Gryllus servillii de Saussure 1877

= Teleogryllus commodus =

Species of cricket

Teleogryllus commodus, commonly known as the black field cricket, is a cricket species native to Australia. They are significant pests to most plants in Australia and New Zealand. T. commodus belongs to the order Orthoptera, the family Gryllidae which are characterized by wings that are folded on the side of the body, chewing mouthparts and long, thin antennae. T. commodus has the ability to learn via the recognition of rewards. They are also capable of odour recognition and thus can be taught via odour pairing.

== Morphology ==
T. commodus can grow up to 30 mm long, with long antennas and legs adapted for jumping. Their coloration is usually black or brown. Nymphs can be recognized by a white stripe on the abdomen. Adult females are characterized by ovipositors which are long structures used for laying eggs. In contrast, males have modified veins in forewings with hard pegs that play a role in song production. Another fact about black field crickets is that their tegmina (leathery forewing) is asymmetrical.

T. commodus undergo hemimetabolous (the lack of pupal stage from larva to adult) development with 3 main stages: egg, nymph (multiple stages~8), and adulthood Females age faster than males do. Furthermore, virgin males have a shorter life expectancy than mated males, most likely due to high calling efforts in attracting mates. However, high quality males may still die sooner if they call very intensely.

== Habitat ==
T. commodus can be located throughout Australia and New Zealand. The species originated in Australia but with time they were introduced to New Zealand. They are known to cause significant damage to pastures and gardens. The habitat of T. commodus consists of rocky surfaces or ground with large amounts of cracks as it gives them shelter from the sun, and is most active at night. Moreover, T. commodus live in clusters and thus seek living quarters that are already occupied by others. The adult males usually change burrows every two days as a consequence of scarce mates or frequent attacks from other males.

== Habit ==
T. commodus are omnivores so their diet is rather broad but they mostly feed on plants, so far no preference for any particular plants has been established. Reproductive differences between male and females result in differing dietary requirements. Females require a diet with higher protein content for the production of eggs, whereas males require an energy rich diet for call production.

== Reproduction ==
Males attract females to burrows through production of advertisement calls, wherein females will mount the males should they be interested - therefore, song production is a key determinant for fitness of the male. Once a female have chosen a mate, they undergo multiple matings to increases the males’ probability of paternity.

Successful mating leads to oogenesis (production of egg), ovulation (release of egg into oviduct), fertilization, and oviposition (deposition of eggs using ovipositor). Once the eggs are laid they need to absorb water required for development. The duration of water absorption is dependent on the temperature of the environment; in higher temperatures, faster water absorption is required. By absorbing water, the size of the egg shell increases thereby increasing the odds of the progeny hatching.

== Song production ==
Male black field crickets produce mating calls using their forewings. Rubbing of wings produces pure tones, while rapid oscillations produce acoustic radiation. The greatest degree of sounds are generated upon wing closure. The general pattern of advertisement calls start with single chirp then move to pulsation with high repetition. The duration of calls is an aspect females seek as an indication of genetic superiority. As such, males spend as long as half a night calling. Prolonged calling, however, comes with a price by shortening of the male lifespan because of the associated high energy expenditure. Calling is also an indicator of male age, as the expression of signaling changes with age. Females showed a preference for males that produce large number of repeats during calling.

== Fight behaviour ==
T. commodus fighting behavior resembles that of hermit crabs and gammarids. Their stereotypical fighting sequence starts with antennal contact and mandible flaring. If neither male concedes from the aggressive display, violent wrestling and biting proceeds. The winner of the fight often exhibits acoustic display. The antennal contact is a way for males to communicate their strength. Naive males are just as likely as larger males to win a non-physical opponent.

== Predators ==
Natural predators of T. commodus include bats and ground beetles. The key to crickets' survival when targeted by predators is detection. T. commodus mostly rely on their hearing when avoiding predators, which is affected by their surroundings.

== Inbreeding avoidance ==
Male T. commodus use advertisement calling to attract mates. Inbred males call less often than out-bred males. Female T. commodus prefer males with a more frequent calling effort, so that inbred males suffer reductions in mating success. Male calling rate likely serves as an indicator to females of genome-wide heterozygosity and/or male condition.
