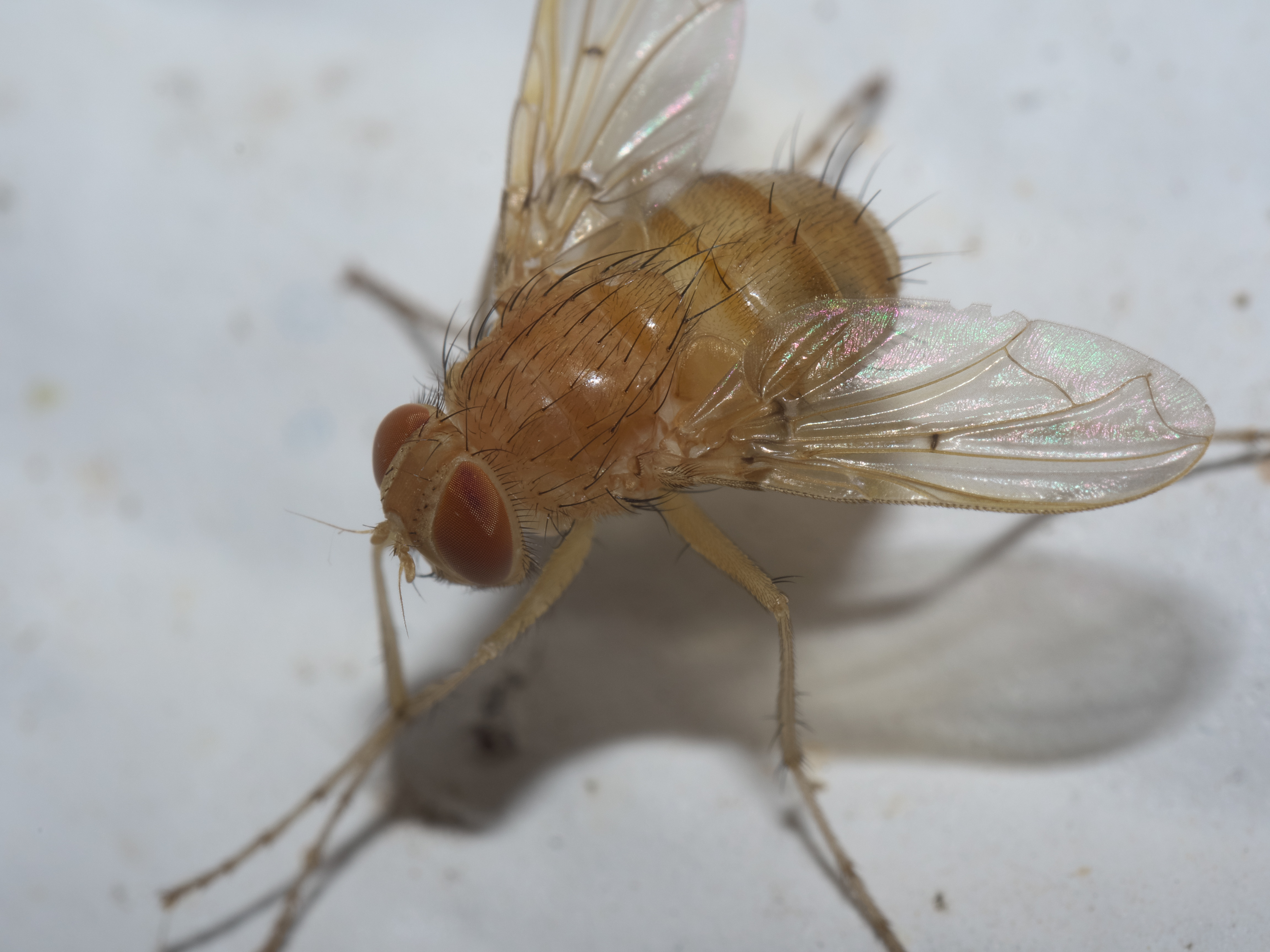
- Ormia reinhardi

Scientific classification
- Kingdom: Animalia
- Phylum: Arthropoda
- Class: Insecta
- Order: Diptera
- Family: Tachinidae
- Subfamily: Tachininae
- Tribe: Ormiini

= Ormiini =

Tribe of flies

Ormiini is a tribe of flies in the family Tachinidae.

== Genera ==
- Aulacephala Macquart, 1851
- Homotrixa Villeneuve, 1914
- Mediosetiger Barraclough, 1983
- Ormia Robineau-Desvoidy, 1830
- Ormiophasia Townsend, 1919
- Phasioormia Townsend, 1933
- Therobia Brauer, 1862
